= Hemel Hempstead =

Town in Hertfordshire, England

Coordinates: 51.7526°N 0.4692°W

- Town
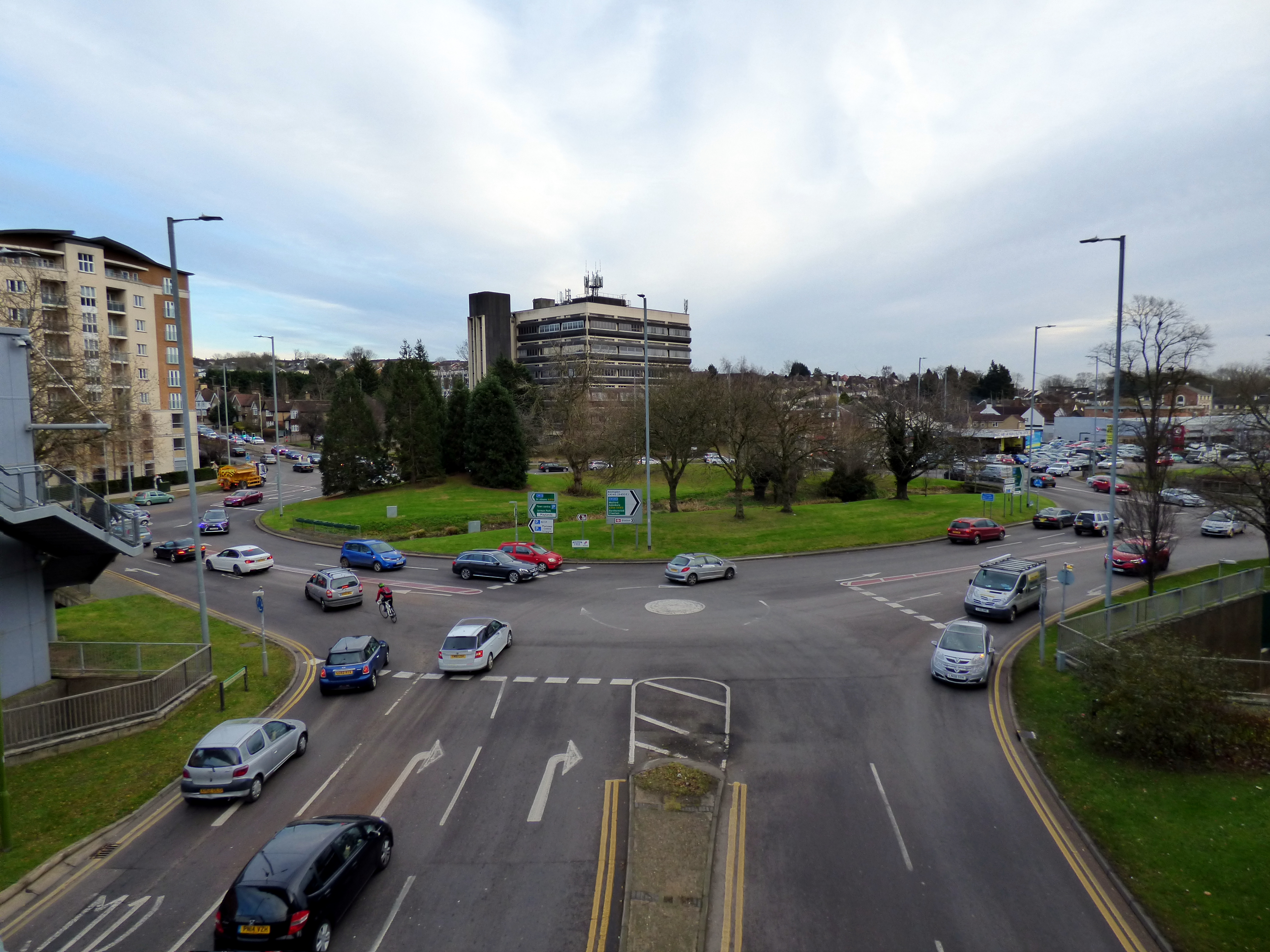
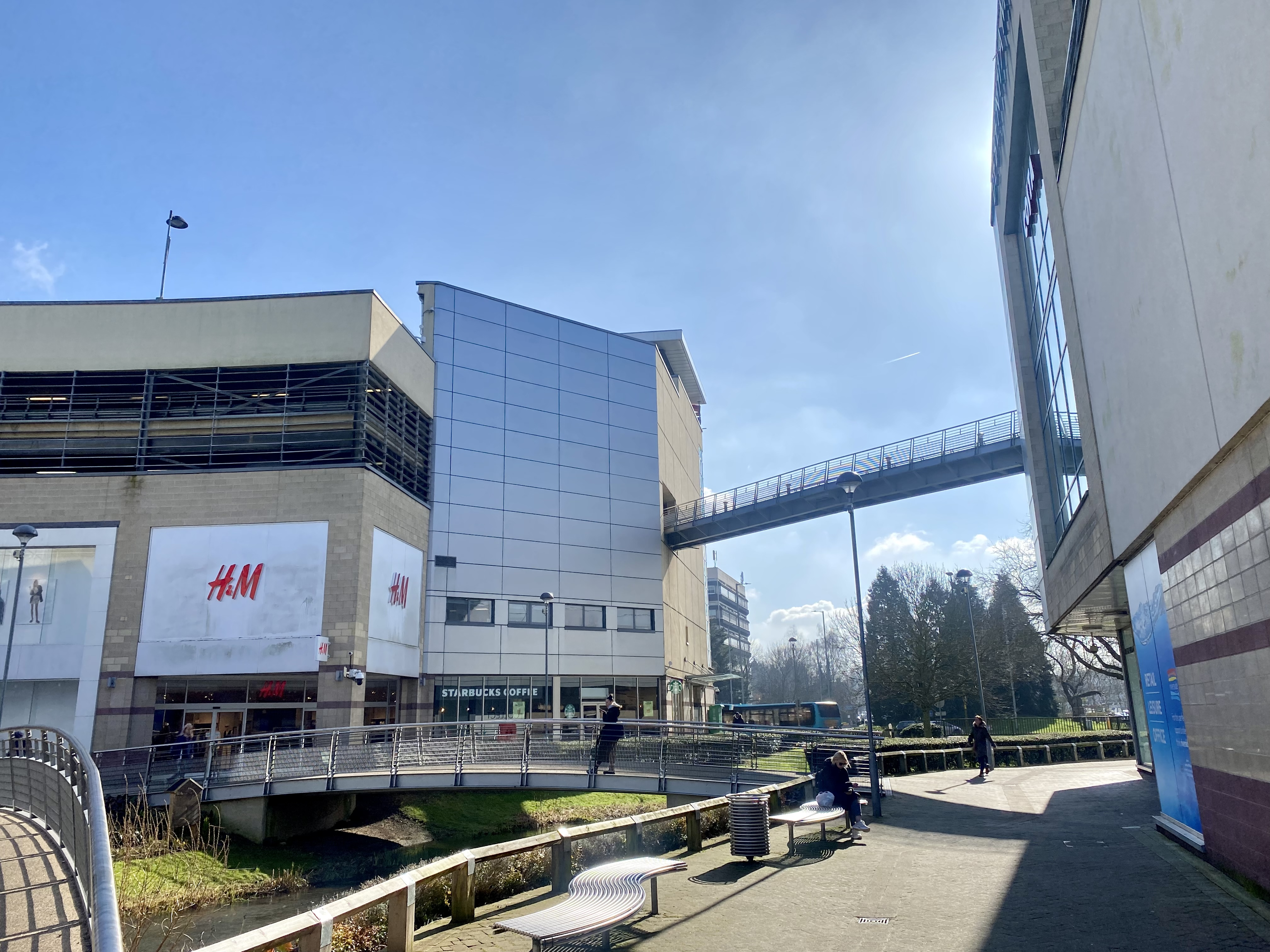
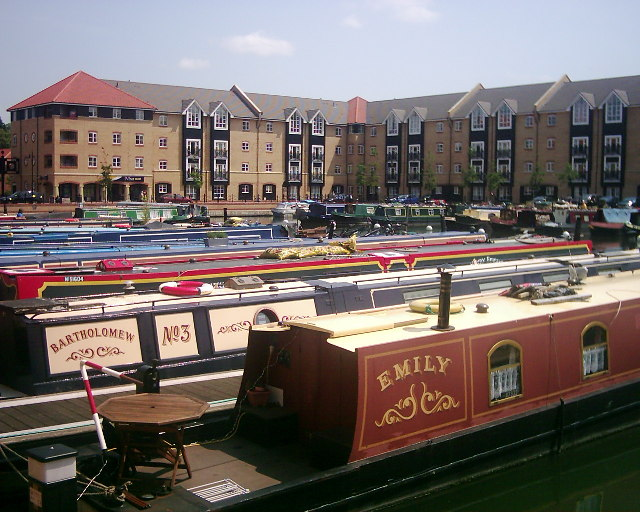
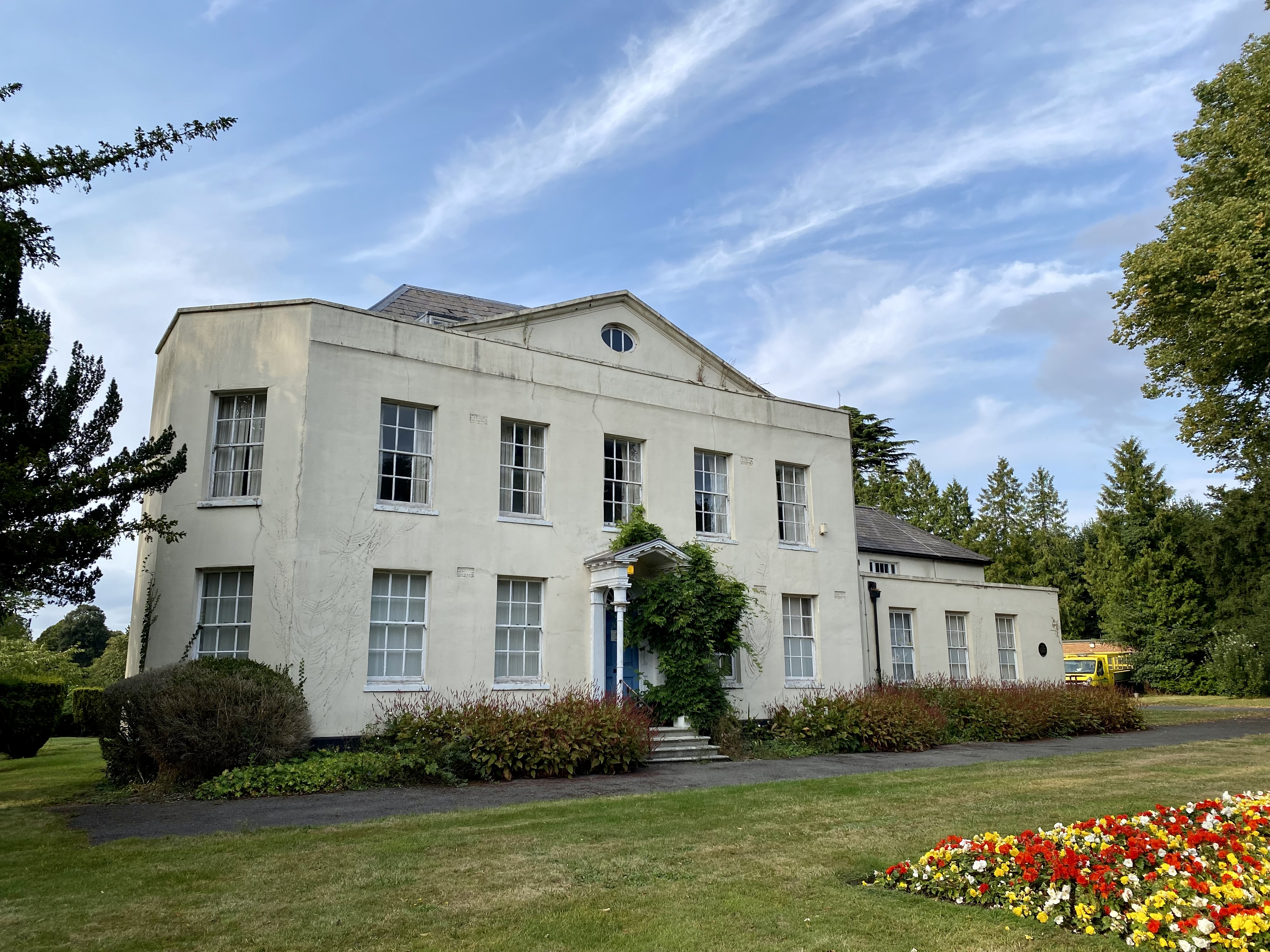
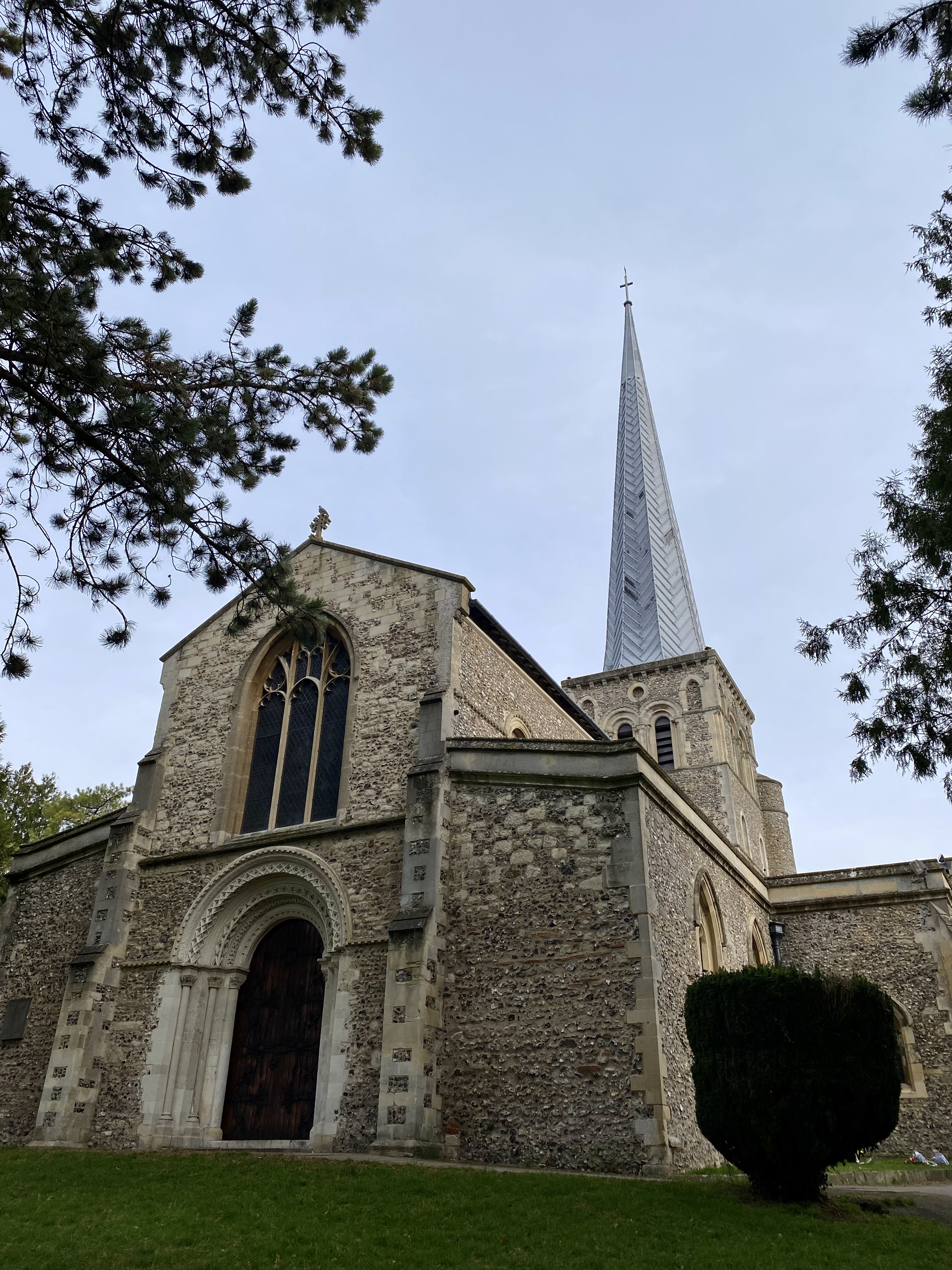
- Plough Roundabout The Riverside Apsley Marina The Bury St Mary's

- Location within Hertfordshire
- Population: 95,961 (2021 Census)
- OS grid reference: TL 056 071
- District: Dacorum
- Shire county: Hertfordshire
- Region: East
- Country: England
- Sovereign state: United Kingdom
- Post town: HEMEL HEMPSTEAD
- Postcode district: HP1, HP2, HP3
- Dialling code: 01442
- Police: Hertfordshire
- Fire: Hertfordshire
- Ambulance: East of England
- UK Parliament: Hemel Hempstead

Hemel Hempstead (/ˌhɛməl ˈhɛmpstɪd/) is a town in the Dacorum district of Hertfordshire, England. It is located 24 miles (39 km) north-west of London; nearby towns and cities include Watford, St Albans and Berkhamsted. The population at the 2021 census was 95,961.

Hemel Hempstead has existed since at least the 8th century and was granted its town charter by Henry VIII in 1539. It has expanded and developed in recent decades after being designated as a New Town after the end of the Second World War.

== History ==
=== Toponymy ===
The settlement was called Henamsted or Hean-Hempsted in Anglo-Saxon times and Hemel-Amstede by the time of William the Conqueror. The name is referred to in the Domesday Book as Hamelamestede, but, in later centuries, it became Hamelhamsted and possibly Hemlamstede. In Old English, -stead or -stede simply meant "place" (reflected in German Stadt and Dutch stede or stad, meaning "city" or "town"), such as the site of a building or pasture, as in clearing in the woods. This suffix is used in the names of other English places, such as Hamstead and Berkhamsted.

One theory suggests that a previous name for the settlement became corrupted to something similar to Hempstead, and that Hemel originated as a way of specifying Hemel Hempstead, as opposed to nearby Berkhamsted. Hemel is reflected in the Dutch Hemel and German Himmel, both of which mean 'heaven' or 'sky'; it could be that Hemel Hempstead was in a less-forested area open to the sky, while Berkhamsted (which could mean 'birch', reflected in the Dutch berk) was in a forest of birch trees. However, this is speculation and unsupported by place name dictionaries.

Another suggestion is that Hemel came from Haemele, the name of the district in the 8th century, and was most likely either the name of the landowner or meant "broken country".

Emigrants from Hemel Hempstead, led by John Carman, settled in the American colonies in the early 17th century and founded the town of Hempstead, New York in 1644.

=== Early history ===
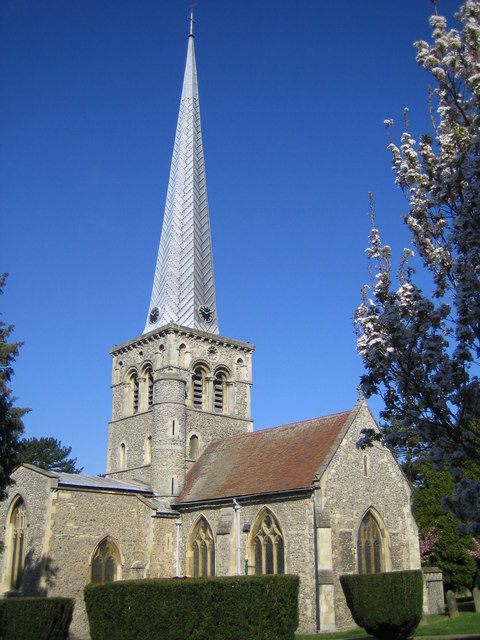
The Norman church of St Mary's (1140)

The first recorded mention of the town is the grant of land at Hamaele by Offa, King of Essex, to the Saxon Bishop of London in 705 AD. Hemel Hempstead on its present site is mentioned in the Domesday Book of 1086 as a vill, Hamelhamstede, with about 100 inhabitants. The parish church of St Mary's was built in 1140, and is recognised as one of the finest Norman parish churches in the county. The church features an unusual 200-foot-tall (60-metre) spire, one of Europe's tallest, which was added in the 14th century.

After the Norman Conquest, Robert, Count of Mortain, the elder half-brother of William the Conqueror, was granted lands associated with Berkhamsted Castle which included Hemel Hempstead. The estates passed through several hands over the next few centuries including Thomas Becket in 1162. Hemel Hempstead was in the Domesday Book's hundred of Danais (Daneys, i.e. Danish), which by 1200 had been combined with the hundred of Tring to form the hundred of Dacorum. This maintained its court into the 19th century. In 1290, King John's grandson, the Earl of Cornwall, gave the manor to the religious order of the Bonhommes when he endowed the monastery at Ashridge.

The town remained part of the monastery's estates until the Reformation and break-up of Ashridge in 1539. In the same year, the town was granted a royal charter by Henry VIII to become a bailiwick with the right to hold a Thursday market and a fair on Corpus Christi Day. The first bailiff of Hemel Hempstead was William Stephyns (29 December 1539). Henry VIII and Anne Boleyn are reputed to have stayed in the town at this time.

In 1953, a collection of unusually fine medieval wall paintings dating from between 1470 and 1500 were discovered in a cottage in Piccotts End, a village on the outskirts of the town. This same building had been converted into the first cottage hospital providing free medical services by Sir Astley Cooper in 1827.

In 1581, a group of local people acquired lands – now referred to as Boxmoor – from the Earl of Leicester to prevent their enclosure. These were transferred to trustees in 1594. These have been used for public grazing and they are administered by the Box Moor Trust.

Remains of Roman villa farming settlements have been found at Boxmoor and Gadebridge, which span the entire period of Roman Britain. A well-preserved Roman burial mound is located in Adeyfield. A major Romano-Celtic temple complex was unearthed at Wood Lane End in Maylands in 1966.

=== 18th to mid-20th century ===
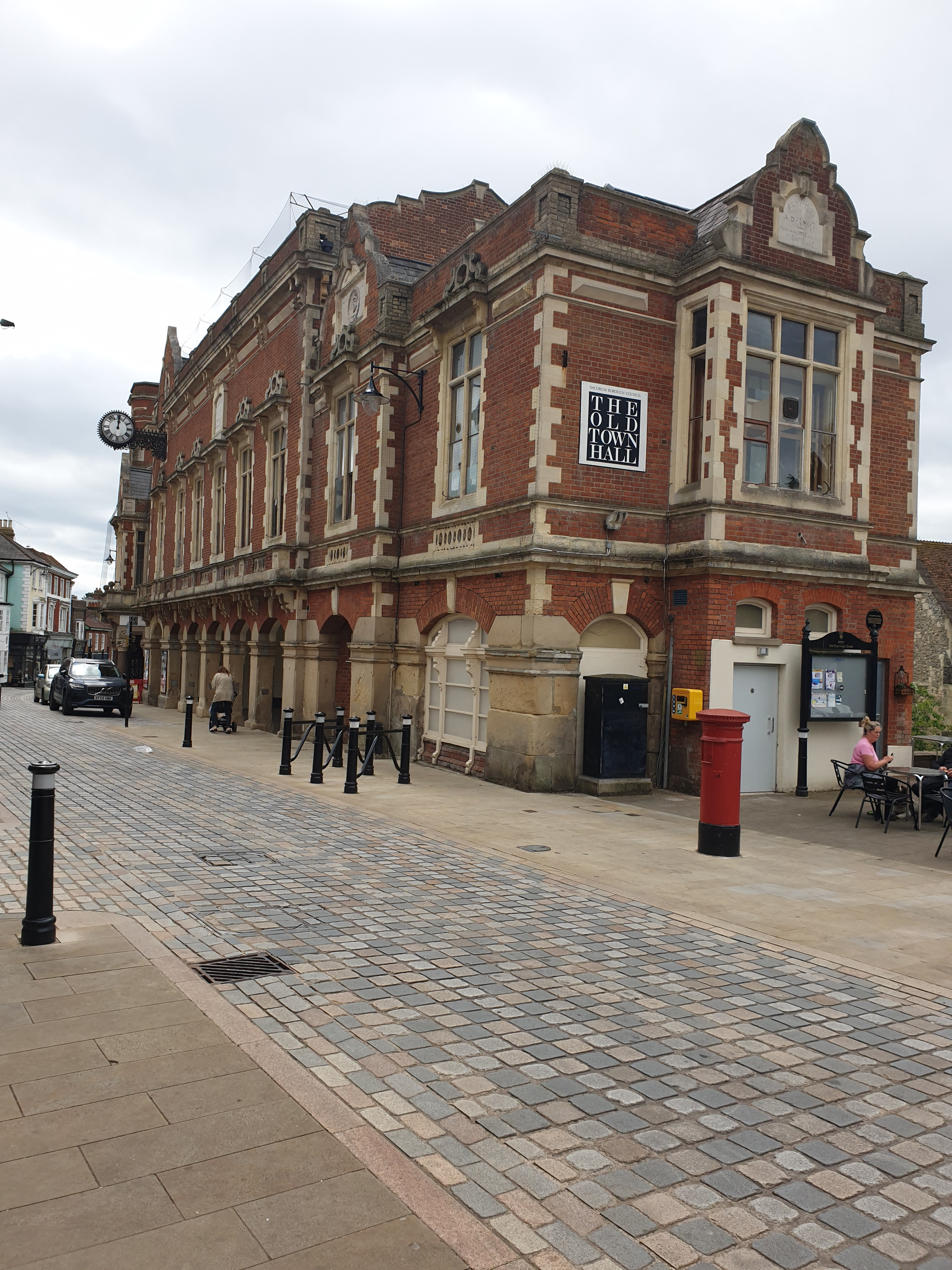
The Old Town Hall

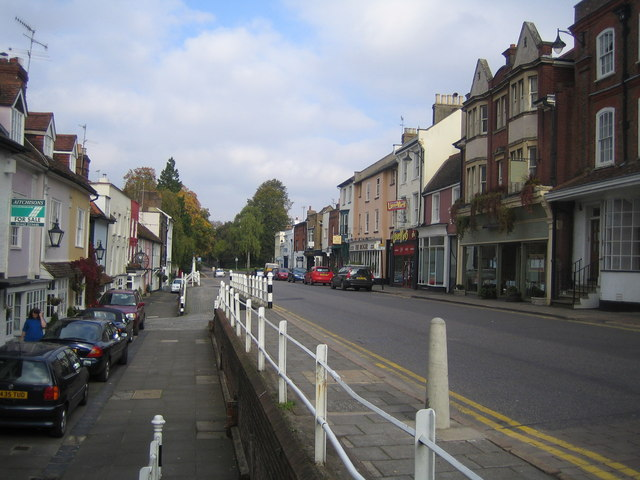
Hemel Hempstead Old Town

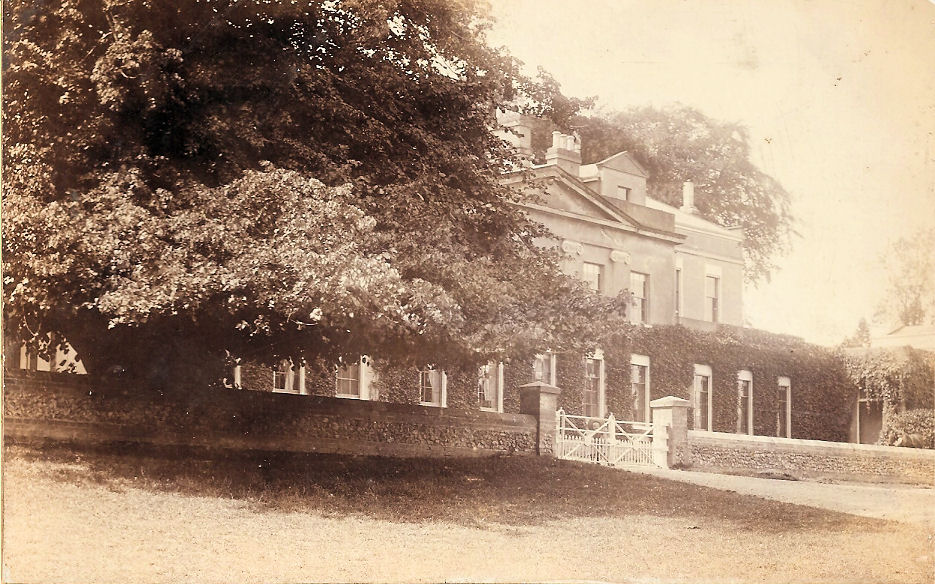
Gadebridge House (demolished 1963)

In the 18th and 19th centuries, Hemel Hempstead was an agricultural market town. Wealthy landowners built a few large country houses in the locality, including The Bury, built in 1790, and Gadebridge House, erected by the noted surgeon and anatomist Sir Astley Cooper in 1811.

As the Industrial Revolution gained momentum, commercial travel between the Midlands and London increased greatly. Hemel Hempstead was located on a direct route between these areas of industry and commerce; this made it a natural waypoint for trade and travel between the two. Initially the Sparrows Herne Turnpike Road was opened in 1762.

In 1793, construction began on the Grand Junction Canal, a major project to provide a freight waterway between the Midlands and the Port of London. In 1798, the canal from the Thames reached Two Waters, just south of the town, and opened fully in 1805.

Hemel's position on the commercial transport network was established further in 1837 when the route of the new London and Birmingham Railway reached the town. The line's construction had been delayed for several years by vigorous lobbying by a number of powerful local landowners, including Sir Astley Cooper of Gadebridge House, who were all keen to protect their estates from invasion by the "iron horse". Their campaign was successful and the main line was routed along the River Bulbourne instead of the River Gade, skirting around the edge of Hemel Hempstead. As a result, the town's railway station was built one mile outside the town centre at Boxmoor; Boxmoor and Hemel Hempstead station (now Hemel Hempstead) opened in 1837.

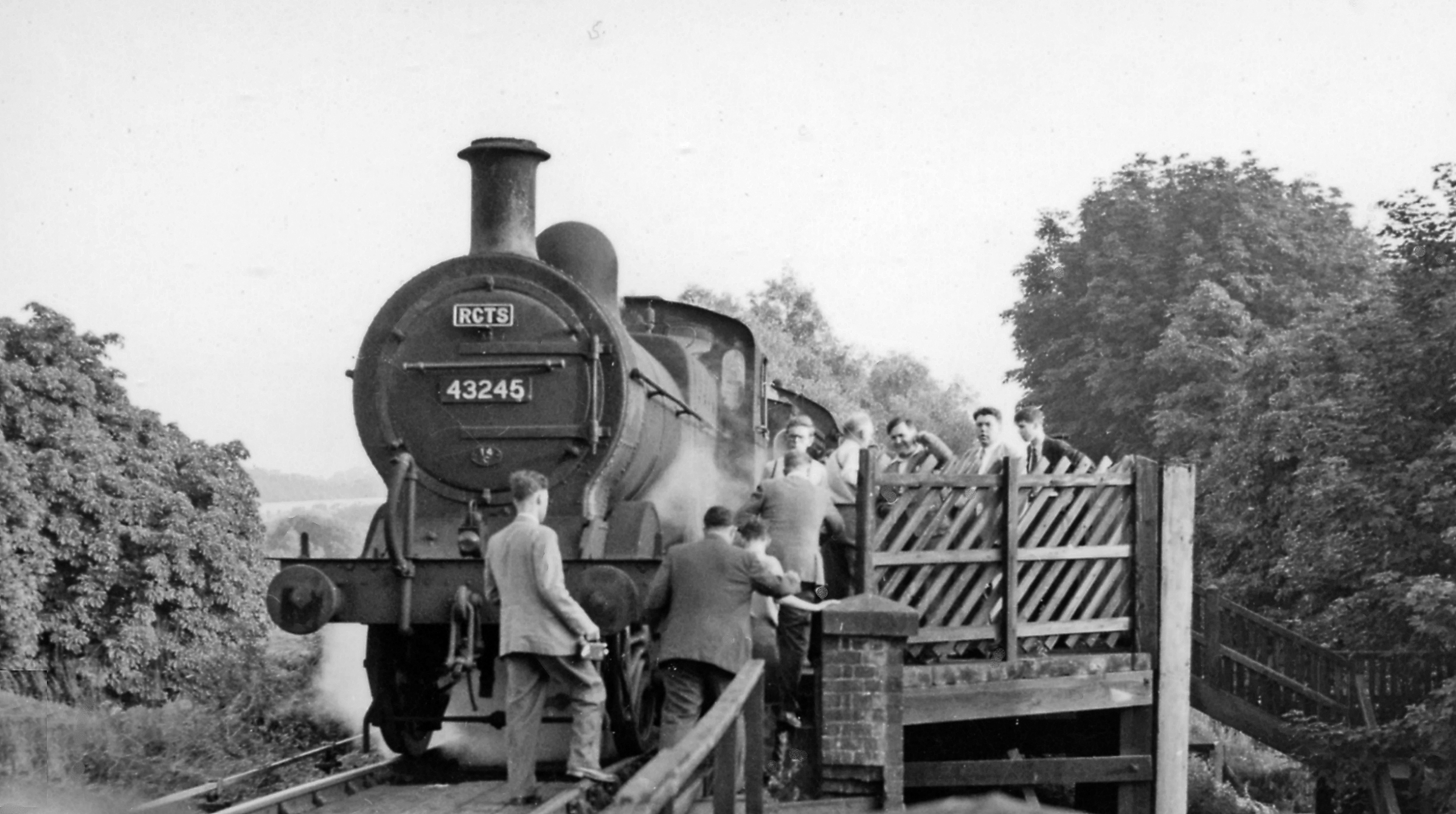
The Nickey Line railway (closed 1949)

The railways continued to expand and, in 1877, a new route opened connecting Boxmoor to the Midland Railway at Harpenden. The Harpenden to Hemel Hempstead branch railway — affectionately known as the Nickey Line — crossed the town centre on a long, curved viaduct, eventually serving three local stations in the town at Heath Park Halt, Hemel Hempsted (Midland) and Godwin's Halt. A new Hemel Hempstead Hospital was established at the bottom of Hillfield Road in 1832.

Despite the incursion of various forms of transport, Hemel remained principally an agricultural market town throughout the 19th century. In the last decades of that century, development of houses and villas for London commuters began. The town steadily expanded, but only became a borough, with its headquarters at the old town hall on 13 July 1898.

During the Second World War, ninety high explosive bombs were dropped on the town by the Luftwaffe. The most notorious incident was on 10 May 1942 when a stick of bombs demolished houses at Nash Mills killing eight people. The nearby John Dickinson & Co. factories which were used to produce munitions, were the target.

=== New town ===
Following the Second World War, in 1946, the government designated Hemel Hempstead as the site of one of its proposed new towns designed to house the population displaced by the London Blitz, since slums and bombsites were being cleared in London. On 4 February 1947, the Government purchased 5,910 acres (23.9 km^{2}) of land and began work on the New Town. The first new residents moved in during April 1949 and the town continued its planned expansion through to the end of the 1980s. The town grew to its present population with new developments enveloping the original town on all sides. The original part of Hemel is still known as the "Old Town".

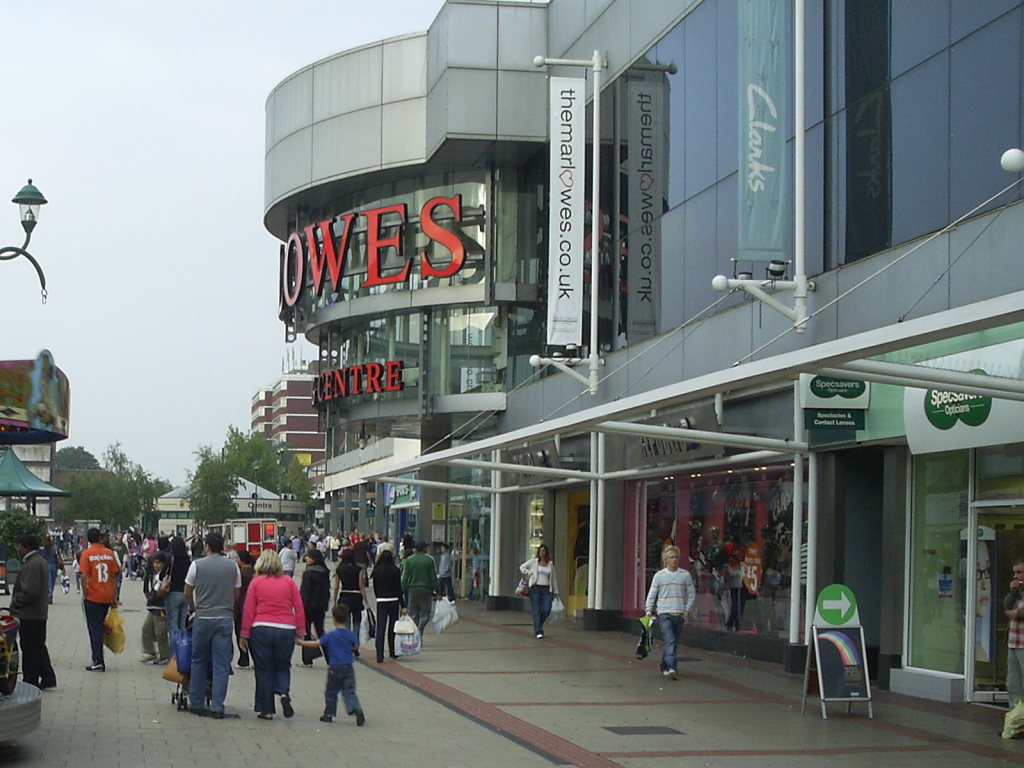
Marlowes shopping centre and the pedestrianised high street

Hemel Hempstead was announced as candidate number three for a New Town in July 1946, in accordance with the government's "policy for the decentralisation of persons and industry from London". Initially, there was much resistance and hostility to the plan from locals, especially when it was revealed that any development would be carried out not by the local council but by a newly appointed government body, the Hemel Hempstead Development Corporation (later amalgamated with similar bodies to form the Commission for New Towns). However, following a public inquiry the following year, the town got the go-ahead. Hemel officially became a New Town on 4 February 1947.

The initial plans for the New Town were drawn up by architect Geoffrey Jellicoe. His view of Hemel Hempstead, he said, was "not a city in a garden, but a city in a park." However, the plans were not well received by most locals. Revised, and less radical plans were drawn up, and the first developments proceeded despite local protests in July 1948. The first area to be developed was Adeyfield. At this time, the plans for a revolutionary double roundabout at Moor End were first put forward, but in fact it was not until 1973 that the roundabout was opened as it was originally designed. It was quickly christened "The Magic Roundabout" by locals, echoing the name of the children's TV show. The first houses erected as part of the New Town plan were in Longlands, Adeyfield, and went up in the spring of 1949. The first new residents moved into their new houses in February 1950.

At this time, work started on building new factories and industrial areas, to avoid the town becoming a dormitory town; the first factory was erected in 1950 in Maylands Avenue. As building progressed with continuing local opposition, the town was becoming increasingly popular with those moving in from areas of north London. By the end of 1951, there was a waiting list of about 10,000 wishing to move to Hemel. The neighbourhoods of Bennett's End, Chaulden and Warner's End were started. Queen Elizabeth II paid a visit shortly after her accession in 1952 and laid a foundation stone for a new church in Adeyfield; this was one of her first public engagements as Queen. The shopping square she visited is named Queen's Square and the nearby area has street names commemorating the then-recent conquest of Everest, such as Hillary and Tenzing Roads. This conquest is also celebrated in the name of a pub in Warners End – the "Top of the World".

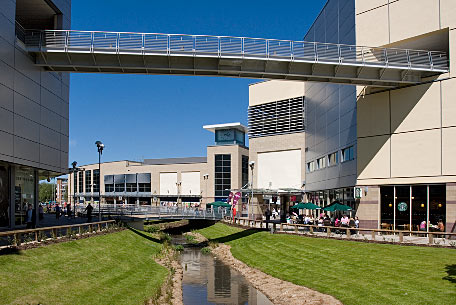
Riverside, an extension to the Marlowes shopping precinct, opened in 2005

The redevelopment of the town centre was started in 1952, with a new centre based on Marlowes south of the old town. This was alongside a green area called the Water Gardens, designed by Jellicoe, formed by ponding back the River Gade. The old centre of the High Street was to remain largely undeveloped, though the market square closed and was replaced by a much larger one in the new centre. The former private estate of Gadebridge was opened up as a public park. New schools and roads were built to serve the expanding new neighbourhoods. New housing technology, such as prefabrication, started to be used from the mid-'50s and house building rates increased dramatically. Highfield was the next neighbourhood to be constructed. The M1 motorway opened to the east in 1959 and a new road connecting it to the town was opened.

By 1962, the redevelopment of the new town as originally envisaged was largely complete, though further expansion plans were then put forward. The nearby United States Air Force base of Bovingdon, which had served as the town's 'de facto' airport, reverted to Royal Air Force use at this time; it continued as an active military airfield until 1971. A campus of West Herts College, the library, new police station and the Pavilion (theatre and music venue) were all built during the 1960s. The town seemed to attract its fair share of celebrity openings, with shops and businesses opened by Frankie Vaughan, Benny Hill, Terry-Thomas and the new cinema was opened by Hollywood star Lauren Bacall. The last of the originally-planned neighbourhoods, Grovehill, began construction in 1967. However, further neighbourhoods of Woodhall Farm and Fields End were later built as part of the extended plans.

Like other first-generation new towns, Hemel is divided into residential neighbourhoods, each with their own village centre with shops, pubs and services. Each neighbourhood is designed around a few major feeder roads, with many smaller cul-de-sacs and crescents, intended to minimise traffic and noise nuisance. In keeping with the optimism of the early post-war years, much of the town features modernist architecture with many unusual and experimental designs for housing. Not all of these have stood the test of time. A significant issue was how to choose names for all the new roads. Many areas of the new town used themes, such as fields, birds, rivers, poets, explorers and leaders.

In 1974, the government abolished the Borough of Hemel Hempstead and the town was incorporated into Dacorum District, along with Tring and Berkhamsted. The first chairman of that council was chairman John Johnson (1913–1977). In the 1980s, Dacorum District Council lobbied successfully to be recognised as the successor for the Royal Charter, establishing the Borough of Hemel Hempstead; it thus regained the Mayor and its Aldermen and became Dacorum Borough in 1984.

== Geography ==
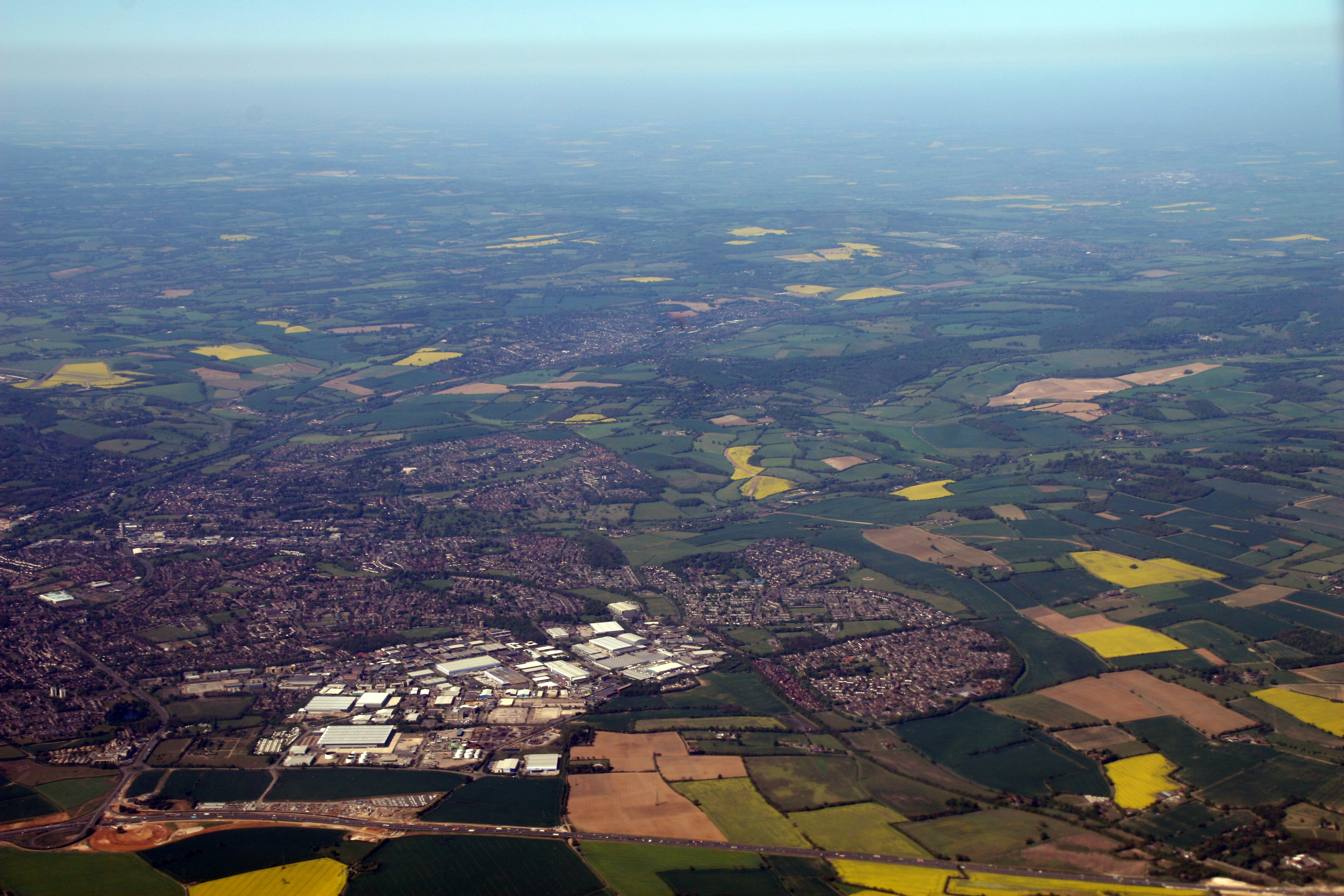
Aerial view of the town

Hemel Hempstead developed in a shallow chalkland valley at the confluence of the rivers Gade and Bulbourne, 27 miles (43 km) north-west of central London. The New Town expansion took place up the valley sides and onto the plateau above the original Old Town.

To the north and west lie mixed farm and woodland with scattered villages, part of the Chiltern Hills. To the west lies Berkhamsted. The River Bulbourne flows along the south-western edge of the town through Boxmoor. To the south lie Watford and the beginnings of the Greater London conurbation. To the east lies St Albans, a cathedral city and also part of the London commuter belt. Possibly the best view of Hemel Hempstead in its physical setting is from the top of Roughdown Common, a chalk hill to the south of the town. (Note: Roughdown Common is located at TL 049 055.)

== Districts ==
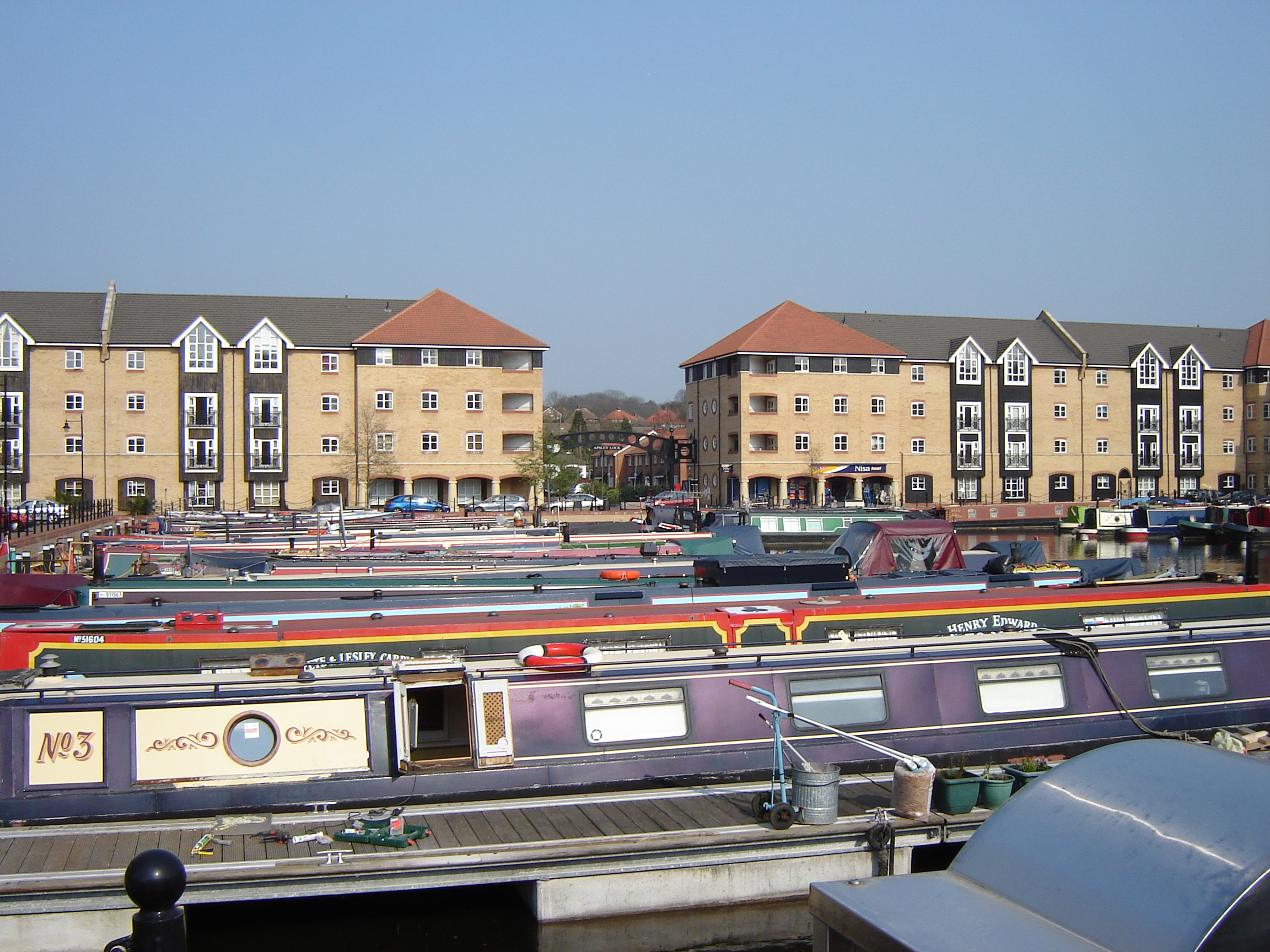
Apsley Lock

=== New town ===
The grand design for Hemel Hempstead new town saw each new district centred around a parade or square of shops, called a neighbourhood centre. Other districts existed before the new town, as suburbs, villages and industrial centres, and were incorporated into the town.

- Adeyfield – located on a hill to the east of the Old Town, this was the first of the New Town districts to be started. The first four families of the new town moved into their homes on 8 February 1950.
- Apsley – a 19th-century mill town a mile south of Old Hemel, which grew up around the paper-making industry, notably the John Dickinson & Co. mills. It is now a suburb of the town, with many warehouse outlets set in retail parks, a large office facility for Hertfordshire County Council and a large Sainsbury's supermarket.
- Bennetts End – located on the rising ground to the south-east and another original district of the new town. Construction began in 1951 and, by autumn 1952, 300 houses were occupied.
- Boxmoor – a mostly Victorian era developed district to the south-west, which grew up because it was near the London Midland and Scottish Railway station and trains to London.
- Chaulden – an early new town district, west of the town, commenced in 1953 with its own neighbourhood shopping centre.
- Corner Hall – an estate adjacent to the Plough Roundabout, frequently thought to be part of Apsley. It is bounded by Lawn Lane and St Albans Hill.
- Cupid Green – an industrial area estate north east of the town and home to its recycling centre.
- Felden – a partly rural area, south-west of Hemel Hempstead, that has many high-value detached houses. It is home to the national headquarters of the Boys' Brigade.
- Gadebridge – a later 1960s development located north-west of the old town, around the Rossgate shopping parade.
- Grovehill – a housing estate towards the northern edge of Hemel Hempstead. It was developed as part of the second wave of development of the new town commencing in 1967 and was completed in stages by the early 1980s. Within the estate is Henry Wells Square, containing local shops, an off licence and a pub. The estate also contains Grovehill Community Centre and Grovehill Playing Fields, home to many football pitches, a baseball ground and changing facilities. Grovehill also incorporates various churches, a doctors' surgery and a dental surgery, as well as several schools including the Astley Cooper School.
- Highfield – a district of the original new town, located north of the old town.
- Leverstock Green – a village a little over two miles east of the old town, which existed before the new town but has now been subsumed into it; it retains its original village centre. It was once a popular place for actors and artists to live.
- Maylands – the industrial zone of the new town from its inception, located to the east. It was originally called the Maylands factory estate but was rebranded as the Maylands Business Park in 2013.
- Nash Mills – a historic name for a district beside the River Gade downstream and south-east of the town, which had water mills since at least the 11th century. It is now a mix of industrial use and housing from the 19th century through to small modern developments.
- Warner's End – an original new town residential district on chalk upland, to the west of Hemel Hempstead where work commenced in 1953.
- Woodhall Farm – a housing estate on the north-eastern edge of town towards Redbourn. Woodhall Farm was built in the mid-to-late 1970s on the former Brocks Fireworks site, with a mix of private and housing association stock. Built by Fairview Estates, it has properties ranging from four-bedroom detached houses to one-bedroom, low-rise flats. The area has a shopping centre, two infant and middle schools, and a doctors' surgery.

=== Developments since the new town ===
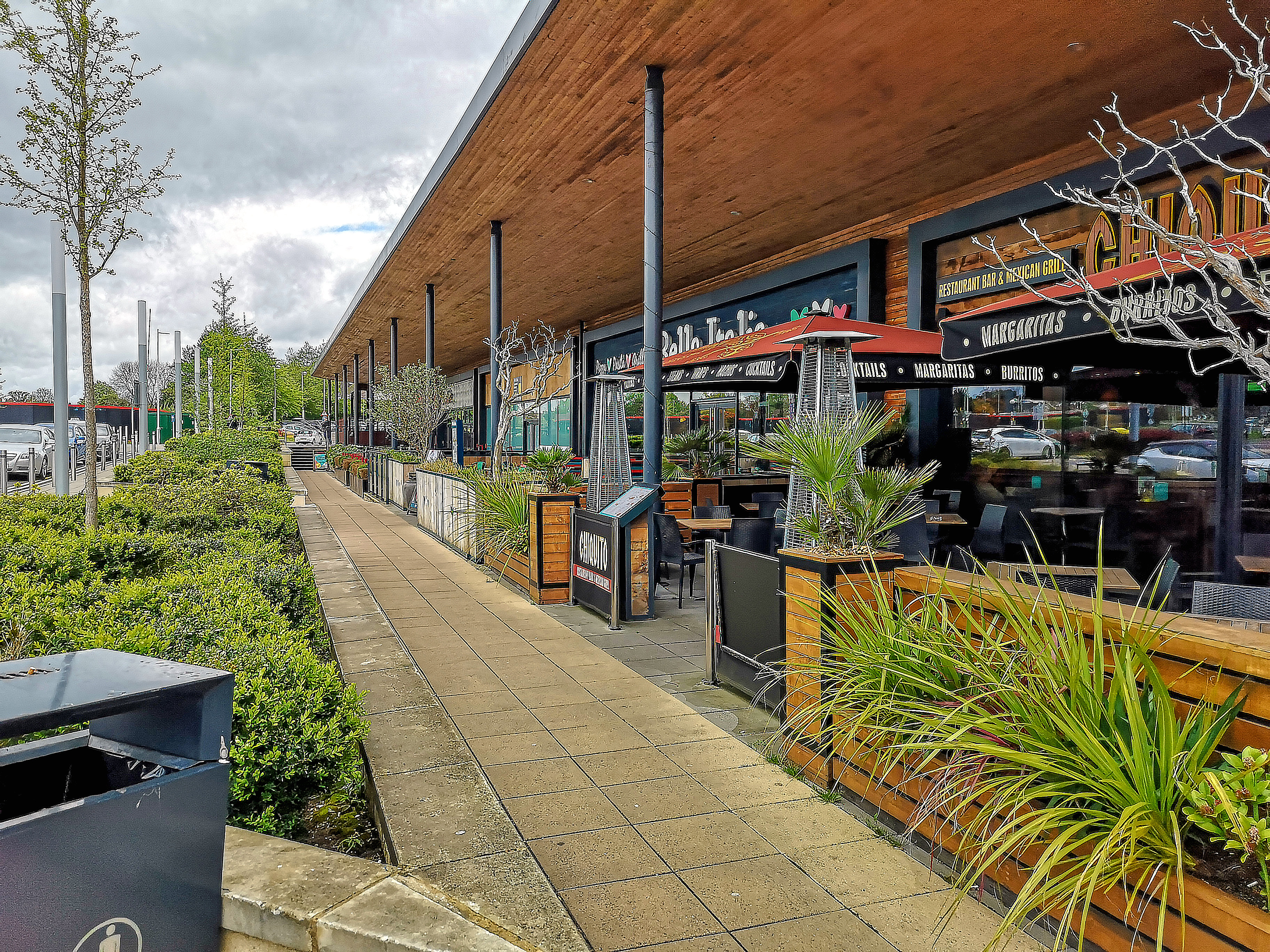
Jarman Park

Jarman Park, the central location for leisure in the town, was previously agricultural land; it later became fields, named after former town councilor and mayor, Henry Jarman, who oversaw the development of the New Town. The developments were built on land originally donated to the town for recreational purposes. Replacement open space was created to the east of the town, near Leverstock Green, Longdean Park and Nash Mills.

The first phase of recreational facilities, which opened in 1978, was the Loco Motion Skate Park. Subsequently, it became a dry ski slope, with a small nursery slope next to it. Both areas were removed to make way for the Snow Centre which opened in 2009. A Tesco superstore was built in 1994 along with a petrol station, which was later expanded into a Tesco Extra; it was the first to be built with natural light let in. The Jarman Leisure Centre complex opened on 25 August 1995, originally managed by The Rank Organisation until 2007 and currently managed by the Tesco Pension Fund. The current 17-screen Cineworld is its flagship attraction. In addition to the cinema, there is an ice rink, several restaurants and a gym.

When it was opened as Leisure World at a cost of £22 million, the cinema originally featured eight screens and was operated by Odeon Cinemas, and later by Empire Cinemas until 2016. The complex also included the upstairs Toddlerworld play area, the Aquasplash water park, Hotshots, which was a 30-lane ten pin bowling facility with a bar, Jarman Park Bowls Club, which was an upstairs bowls facility with seven rinks, restaurants, a large arcade in the middle of the building, snooker and pool tables, a discothèque called Visage (subsequently Lava), a nightclub and a themed bar.

In December 2011, plans were submitted by the then landlords Capital & Regional to redevelop the site. It proposed a collection of family-friendly cafes and restaurants, with Aquasplash closing down.

The cinema continued to operate while the ice rink went under refurbishment; it was expanded from eight screens to 17, with one large 281 IMAX auditorium.

A nearby athletics track, opened in 1996, is managed by the sports group Sportspace, with a small adjacent children's play park. The track is used by local schools for sports days.

The most recent facility, which opened in July 2011, is an extreme sports centre called the XC, which contains a skate park, caving, climbing walls, high ropes, a café and counselling rooms for young people. It is co-run by Youth Connexions and Sportspace.

==== Apsley Mills ====
The former John Dickinson & Co. mills site, straddling the canal at Apsley, was redeveloped with two retail parks, a Sainsbury's supermarket, three low-rise office blocks, housing, a mooring basin, a Holiday Inn Express hotel and an additional office block. Some buildings have been retained for their historic interest and to provide a home for the Apsley Paper Museum.

The now-disused mill site at Nash Mills was also redeveloped to build housing and community facilities; it retains some historic buildings.

==== Marlowes and the Old Town ====
An indoor shopping mall was developed adjacent to the south end of the Marlowes retail area in 1990. In 2005, the Riverside development, designed by Bernard Engle Architects, was opened, effectively extending the main shopping precinct towards the Plough Roundabout. The new centre includes several outlets for national retailers, including Starbucks and Waterstones. These two developments have moved the 'centre of gravity' of the retail centre away from the north end of Marlowes, which has become an area for secondary outlets. Further extensive redevelopment of the northern end of Marlowes was given the green light in 2007 and has since been completed.

In late 2014, the council began to improve the appearance of the original new-town's centre. The Old Town was refurbished with new paving, signage and landscaping. The old council buildings and library were closed and replaced with a new development named The Forum, which opened in early 2017. This area is now home to Dacorum Borough Council, the new library, Hertfordshire Police's Safer Neighbourhood Team, the Hertfordshire Registration and Citizenship Service, Dacorum Community Trust, Mediation Dacorum, Relate and the Citizen's Advice Bureau. Several hundred new homes have been built alongside this new development and a riverside walk/cycle way established. The abandoned market square is set to be more leisure facilities.

The Jellicoe Water Gardens have been restored, clearing up the overgrown trees, introducing a new play area and an area for picnics and gardening, as well as a community centre for volunteers, learning organisations and schools, and the Friends of the Jellicoe Water Gardens. There is also a new terrace for the flower garden.

The pedestrianised high street has been redeveloped, with a new play area and equipment around the street, such as giant coloured balls, slides, a tightrope and trampolines. A sculpture showcasing the work of Geoffrey Jellicoe has been installed on top of a new pillar.

Isle of Man-based residential developer Dandara redeveloped the old Kodak headquarters into a block of flats, with a new footbridge to the Riverside shopping precinct.

==== Maylands ====
Since the 2005 Buncefield fire, the former Maylands Avenue factory estate, which was badly affected by the fire, has been rebranded as Maylands Business Park. A 40-tonne sculpture by Jose Zavala, called Phoenix Gateway, has been placed on the first roundabout off the M1 to symbolise its renewal. A number of businesses have since located into the Maylands area.

=== Major planned developments ===
==== East Hemel ====
St Albans District council plans to meet its new homes building target by building on land to the east of Hemel Hempstead near the M1 motorway; this would comprise 2,500 new homes. The land is within St Albans planning jurisdiction but the development would have a major impact on Hemel services and consequently has proven controversial.

==== West Hemel ====
Land to the west of Chaulden and Warners End has been removed from the Green Belt designation and is due for development with 900 new homes.

== Places of worship ==
- St Mary's, Old Town
- St John's Church, Boxmoor
- The Church of the Resurrection, Grovehill
- St Francis of Assisi, Hammerfield
- Methodist Church, Northridge Way
- Parish Church of St Alban, Warners End
- St George's United Reformed Church, Long Chaulden
- St Stephen, Chaulden
- Our Lady, Queen of All Creation R C Church, Bennets End
- Hemel Hempstead Seventh-day Adventist Church, Bennets End
- Christ Church Hemel, Bennets End
- St Benedicts C of E Church, Bennets End
- Belmont Road Baptist Church, Bennets End
- New Life Pentecostal Church, Bennets End
- St Mary’s Church, Apsley
- Sunrise Church, Apsley
- Quaker Meeting House, Old Town
- Bethel Reformed Baptist Church, Nash Mills
- St Mary & St Joseph Catholic Church, Boxmoor
- South Hill Church, Boxmoor
- Bethel Living Stone Church, Marlowes
- New Church Hemel, Galley Hill
- Saint Thomas' Indian Orthodox Church, Grovehill
- Amaravati Buddhist Monastery, Great Gaddesden
- Baytus Salaam Mosque, Woodhall Farm
- Jummah Salah (Mosque) in Highfield Community Centre
- Quwwatul Islam Markazi Jamia Mosque Mehria Ghousia, Bennets End.
- Carey Baptist Church Marlowes
- Alexandra Road Congregational Church, Old Town

== Commerce, industry and agriculture ==
=== Historical ===
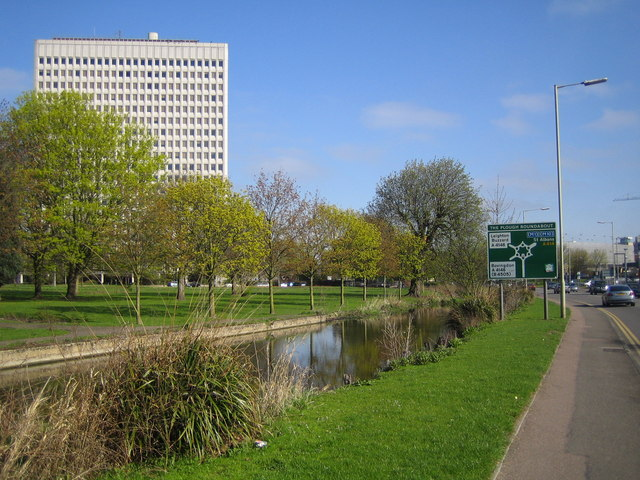
Kodak's former European HQ closed in 2006 (now converted into flats)

Historically, the area was agricultural and was noted for its rich cereal production. The agricultural journalist William Cobbett noted of Hemel Hempstead in 1822 that "..the land along here is very fine: a red tenacious flinty loam upon a bed of chalk at a yard or two beneath, which, in my opinion, is the very best corn land that we have in England." By the 18th century, the grain market in Hemel was one of the largest in the country. In 1797, there were 11 watermills working in the vicinity of the town.

The chalk on which Hemel is largely built has had commercial value; it has been mined and exploited to improve farmland and for building from the 18th century. In the Highbarns area, now residential, there was a collapse in 2007 of a section of old chalk workings and geological studies have been undertaken to show the extent of these workings.

In the 19th century, Hemel Hempstead was a noted brickmaking, paper manufacturing and straw-plaiting centre. In later 19th and early 20th centuries, it was also a noted watercress growing area, supplying 1/16 of the country's national demand – following development of the New Town, the watercress growing moved to nearby Berkhamsted and Tring. The cress beds were redeveloped as the modern-day Water Gardens.

Joseph Cranstone's engineering company was founded in 1798 and was responsible for much of the early street lighting in the town, as well as it first gasworks. It became the Hemel Hempstead Engineering Company and stayed in business until the Second World War. In 1867, Cranstone's son built a steam powered coach which he drove to London, but which was destroyed in a crash on the return journey. A local Boxmoor pub commemorates the event.

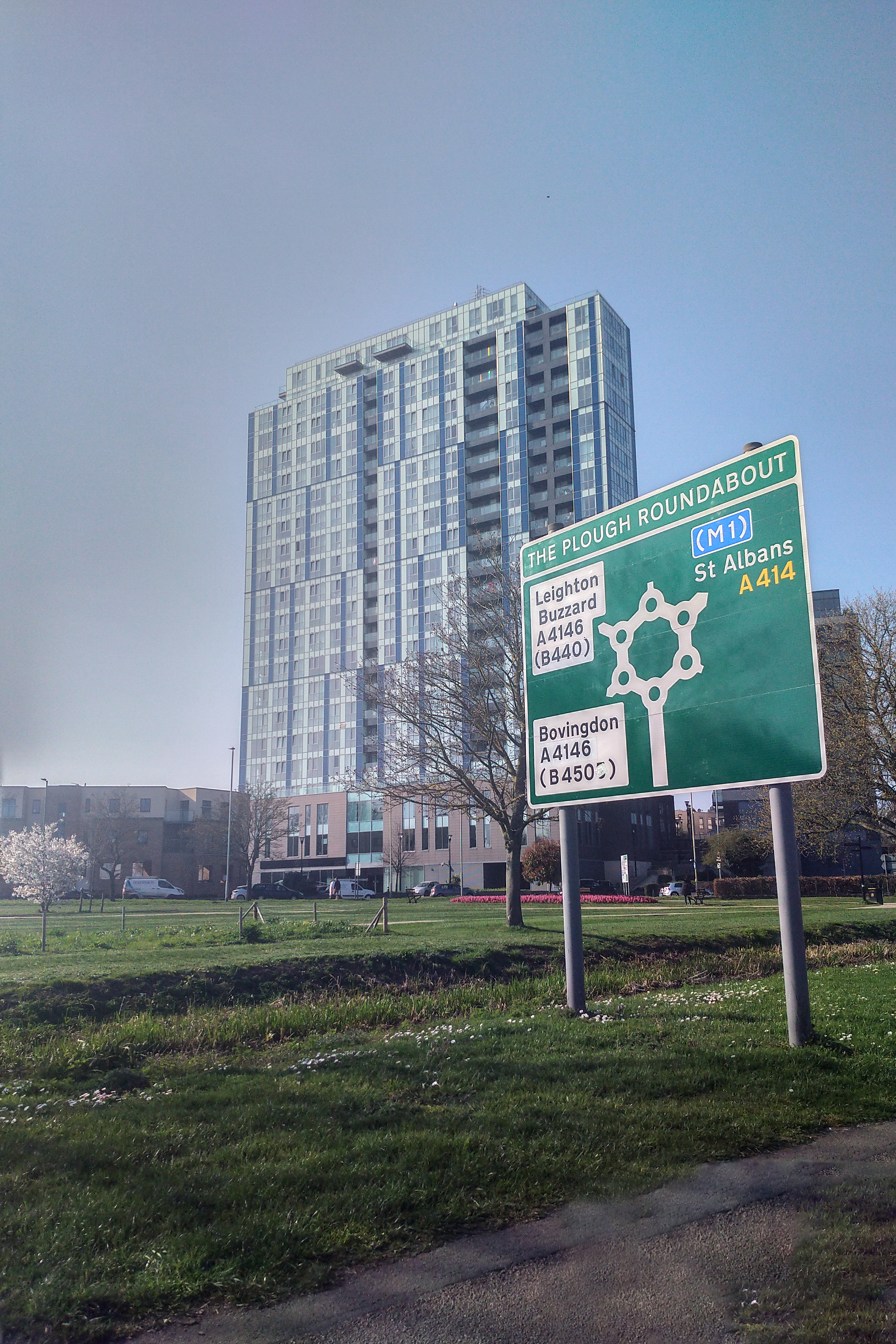
The converted Kodak building – now known as the KD Tower – viewed from the Magic Roundabout

In 1803, the first automatic papermaking machinery was developed in Hemel by the Fourdrinier brothers at Frogmore. Paper making expanded in the vicinity in the early 19th century and grew into the large John Dickinson & Co. mills in the 20th century.

A traditional employer in the area was also Brock's, manufacturer of fireworks. The factory was a significant employer since well before the Second World War and remained in production until the mid-1970s. The present-day neighbourhood of Woodhall Farm was subsequently built on the site.

From 1967 to 1983, it was home to one of the most remarkable newspaper experiments of recent times, when the Thomson Organisation launched the Hemel Hempstead Evening Post-Echo. This comprised two evening papers: the Evening Echo and the Evening Post; it was based at a modern headquarters in Mark Road, which had previously been used as a hot water bottle factory. The dual operation was conceived by Lord Thomson of Fleet to take on the Northcliffe and Beaverbrook domination of the London evening paper market, and tap into what he saw as a major source of consumer advertising.

The papers were remarkable not only for technological innovation but also journalistic excellence. Both the Evening Echo and Evening Post won design awards during the late 1960s and early 1970s; it was the former that took the major writing honours, with John Marquis being voted Provincial Journalist of the Year in 1974 and Melanie Phillips being named Young Journalist of the Year in 1975.

Many outstanding journalists worked on both papers during their heyday, with several going on to be editors and leading Fleet Street figures. Unfortunately, the operation fell victim to the freesheet revolution of the 1980s; the titles closed in 1983, with the loss of 470 jobs.

Significant historic local firms include:

- Addressograph, address labels and labelling systems
- Apple's UK operations were originally based in Hemel, although they moved to much larger premises in Uxbridge in the late 1980s.
- BP
- Brocks Fireworks, firework manufacturer
- Crosfield Electronics – digital imaging systems, now part of FFEI Ltd.
- Hemel Hempstead Evening Post-Echo, then part of Thomson Regional Newspapers and one of the few nightly regional newspapers
- John Dickinson & Co., paper manufacturing
- Kodak
- Lucas Aerospace – moved (as TRW Aeronautical Systems) to Pitstone in 2002.
- Parker Hannifin.

=== Present day ===
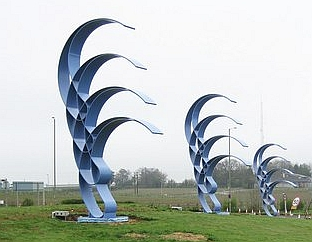
Phoenix Gateway sculpture at the entrance to Maylands Business Park commemorates the Buncefield fire

Hemel Hempstead has a mixture of heavy and light engineering companies; it has attracted a significant number of information technology and telecommunications sector companies, helped by its proximity to London and the UK motorway network. However, and again in common with many new towns, it has a much narrower business base than established centres, particularly Watford and St Albans.

== Transport ==
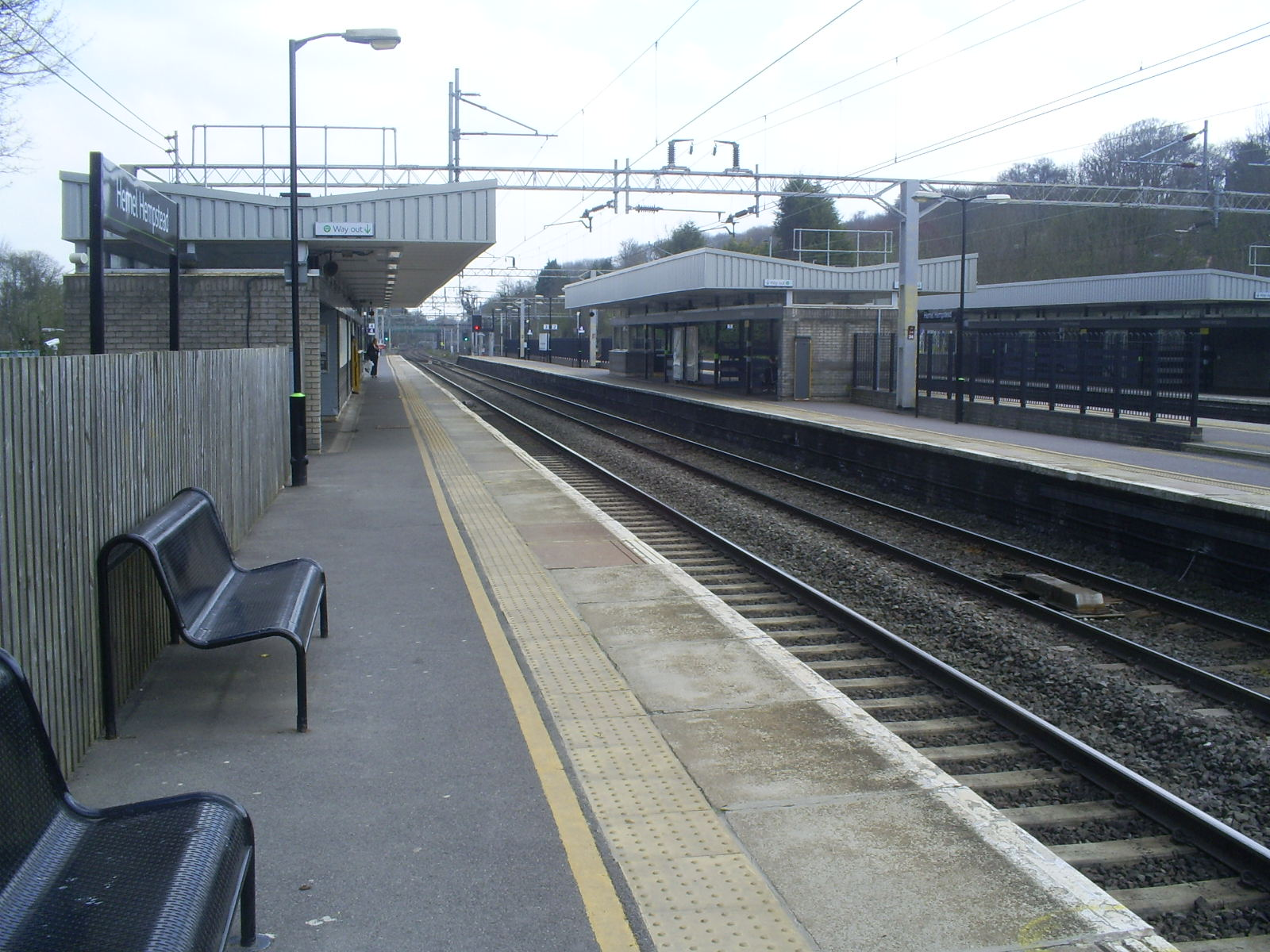
Hemel Hempstead railway station is on the West Coast Main Line, on the western edge of the town

=== Waterways ===
In 1798, the construction of the Grand Junction Canal reached Hemel Hempstead. Now part of the Grand Union Canal, it is a popular route for narrowboat pleasure craft and is maintained by the Canal & River Trust.

=== Rail ===
Hemel Hempstead railway station is located 1 mile (1.6 km) south of the town centre in Boxmoor, on the West Coast Main Line. London Northwestern Railway operates frequent services between London Euston, Tring and Milton Keynes Central.

Hemel Hempsted (Midland) station (Note: The spelling of Hempsted was used for this station.) also served the town on the former Nickey Line to Harpenden. It was closed to passenger services in 1947, along with the line, and it was demolished in 1969.

=== Buses ===
The town is served by Arriva Herts & Essex, Centrebus (South), Red Rose Travel and Red Eagle; key routes link the town with Aylesbury, Harpenden, High Wycombe, Luton, Rickmansworth, St Albans and Watford. The bus interchange is situated in Waterhouse Street. In 2013, Dacorum Council announced that the former bus station would be demolished and replaced next to the Marlowes Shopping Centre on Bridge Street; the project was completed in September 2014.

=== Roads ===
In the 1990s, the A41 dual carriageway was built with a link to the town across the upland chalk plateau. Hemel Hempstead is linked to the M1 motorway to the east and the M25 to the south.

=== Future plans ===
Hertfordshire County Council is considering proposals to develop an east–west transit system, Hertfordshire Essex Rapid Transit (HERT) across the central belt of Hertfordshire, which could run from Hemel Hempstead to Harlow in Essex via St Albans. The project is not confirmed and remains unfunded, and HERT vehicles have not been specified, but proposals indicate that zero-emission passenger vehicles are being considered, including trams, guided busways, or trackless trams.

== Education ==
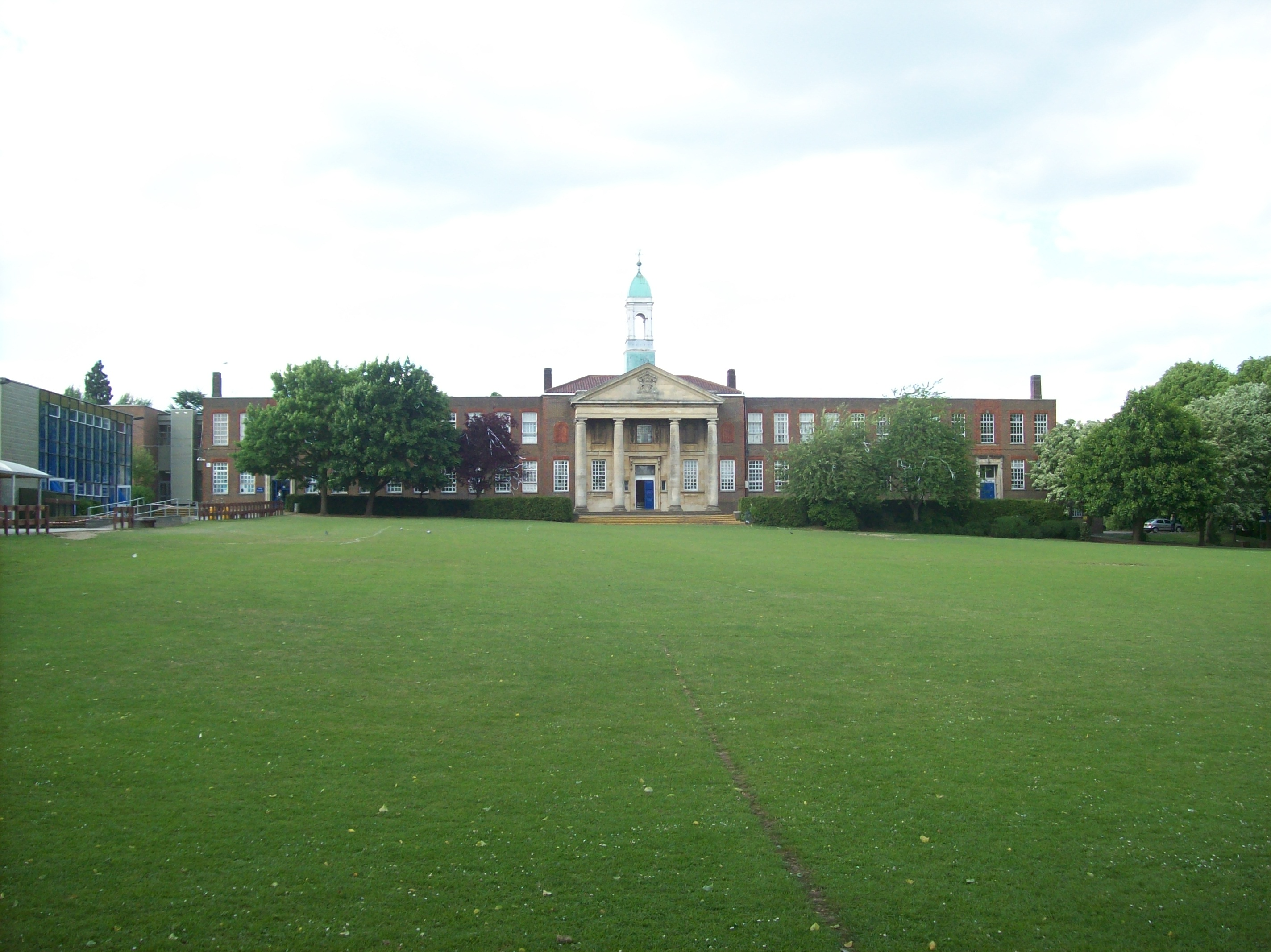
The Hemel Hempstead School

There are seven state-maintained secondary schools in the town:

- Adeyfield Academy – a member of the ATLAS Multi Academy Trust
- The Astley Cooper School – a member of the East Dacorum Co-operative Learning Trust
- Laureate Academy – a member of Future Academies, a multi-academy trust; formerly known as the Cavendish School until 2019
- The Hemel Hempstead School – a member of Scholars' Education Trust, a multi-academy trust
- John F. Kennedy Catholic School – a member of the All Saints Catholic Academy Trust
- Longdean School – a standalone academy trust specialising in maths and computing.

There are also three independent schools in, or adjacent, to the town:

- Abbot's Hill School – a day and boarding school for girls
- Lockers Park School – a day and boarding school for boys aged 5–13
- Westbrook Hay School – a co-educational school for children aged 3–13.

In addition, there is a West Herts College campus based in the town centre.

In 2006, the local education authority judged that there were too many primary school places in the town and published proposals to reduce them; the options involved school amalgamations and closures.

== Governance ==
=== National representation ===
The town forms the bulk of Hemel Hempstead parliamentary constituency, which also includes some outlying villages.

In the 21 general elections since the new town was created, a Conservative MP has been returned 17 times and a Labour MP four times. The current MP is Labour's David Taylor, who was elected for the first time in the 2024 General Election.

=== Local government ===
Hemel Hempstead has two tiers of local government, at district and county level: Dacorum Borough Council and Hertfordshire County Council. There is no parish or town council, which has been an unparished area since 1974.

Hemel Hempstead
- Bailiwick (1539–1898); Municipal Borough (1898–1974)
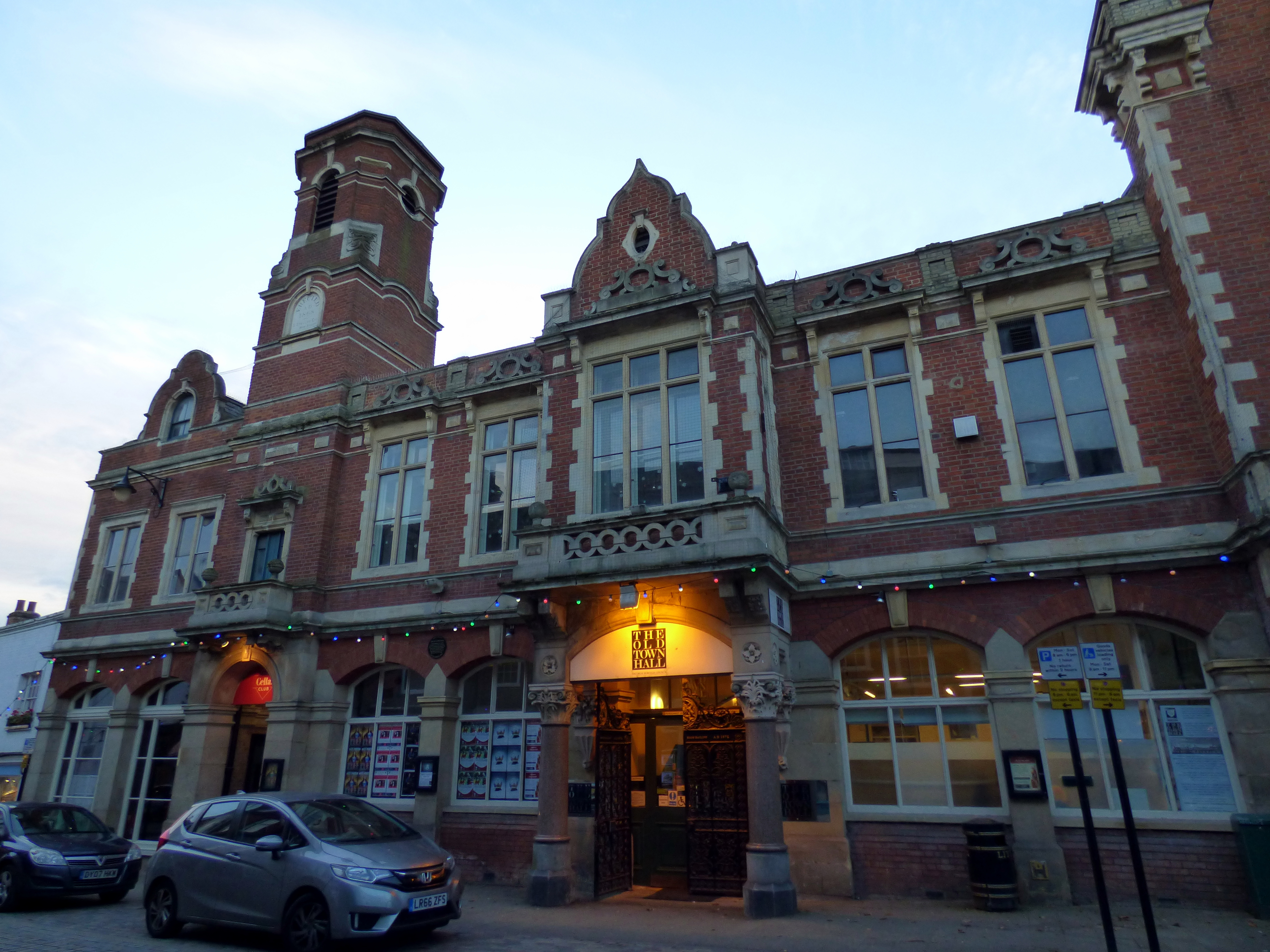
- Town Hall, High Street, Hemel Hempstead
- Population
  - 1901: 11,264
  - 1971: 68,395
- History
  - Created: 29 December 1539 (Bailiwick); 8 June 1898 (Borough)
  - Abolished: 31 March 1974
  - Succeeded by: Dacorum
  - HQ: Town Hall, High Street, Hemel Hempstead
- Contained within
  - County Council: Hertfordshire

Historically, the parish of Hemel Hempstead was in the hundred of Dacorum. On 29 December 1539, Henry VIII granted the town a charter of incorporation under the title the Bailiff and Inhabitants, making the town a bailiwick, which was given the right to hold a market, a fair and a court of piepowders.

In 1835, Hemel Hempstead became the centre of a poor law union and a workhouse was built on Redbourn Road.

The town's status in having a bailiff and corporation was relatively unusual. It was sometimes described as a borough, but it was not counted as a borough for the purposes of the Municipal Corporations Act 1835, nor the Municipal Corporations Act 1883. As such, the old corporation did not become a municipal borough; it did not assume the powers and responsibilities, which were gradually given to municipal boroughs after 1835. Instead, local government functions passed to the board of guardians of the poor law union, which also became a rural sanitary district in 1872. The Local Government Act 1894 converted rural sanitary districts into rural districts and established elected parish councils. From December 1894, Hemel Hempstead therefore found itself governed by the Hemel Hempstead Rural District Council, Hemel Hempstead Parish Council, and the still-operating but largely powerless bailiff and corporation. One consequence of the town's anomalous status was that it had the last operating court of piepowders in England, with the final session held on 2 December 1897.

The town petitioned Queen Victoria to allow it to become a municipal borough and a borough charter was granted on 8 June 1898. The old corporation and parish council were both dissolved, replaced by a new municipal borough council. The borough also became independent from the Hemel Hempstead Rural District. The first mayor of the borough was Sir Astley Paston Paston-Cooper of Gadebridge House.

For most of its existence, Hemel Hempstead Borough Council was based at the Town Hall on High Street, which had been built in 1851 for the old corporation. A new Town Hall was built for the borough council in 1966 on Marlowes, between the old town and the new town centre.

Hemel Hempstead Municipal Borough was abolished under the Local Government Act 1972, becoming part of the district of Dacorum (named after the ancient hundred which covered a similar area) on 1 April 1974. Dacorum District Council used the 1966 Hemel Hempstead Town Hall on Marlowes as its headquarters, renaming it Dacorum Civic Centre. In recognition of the town's former borough status, Dacorum district was awarded borough status on 10 October 1984.

== Notable features ==
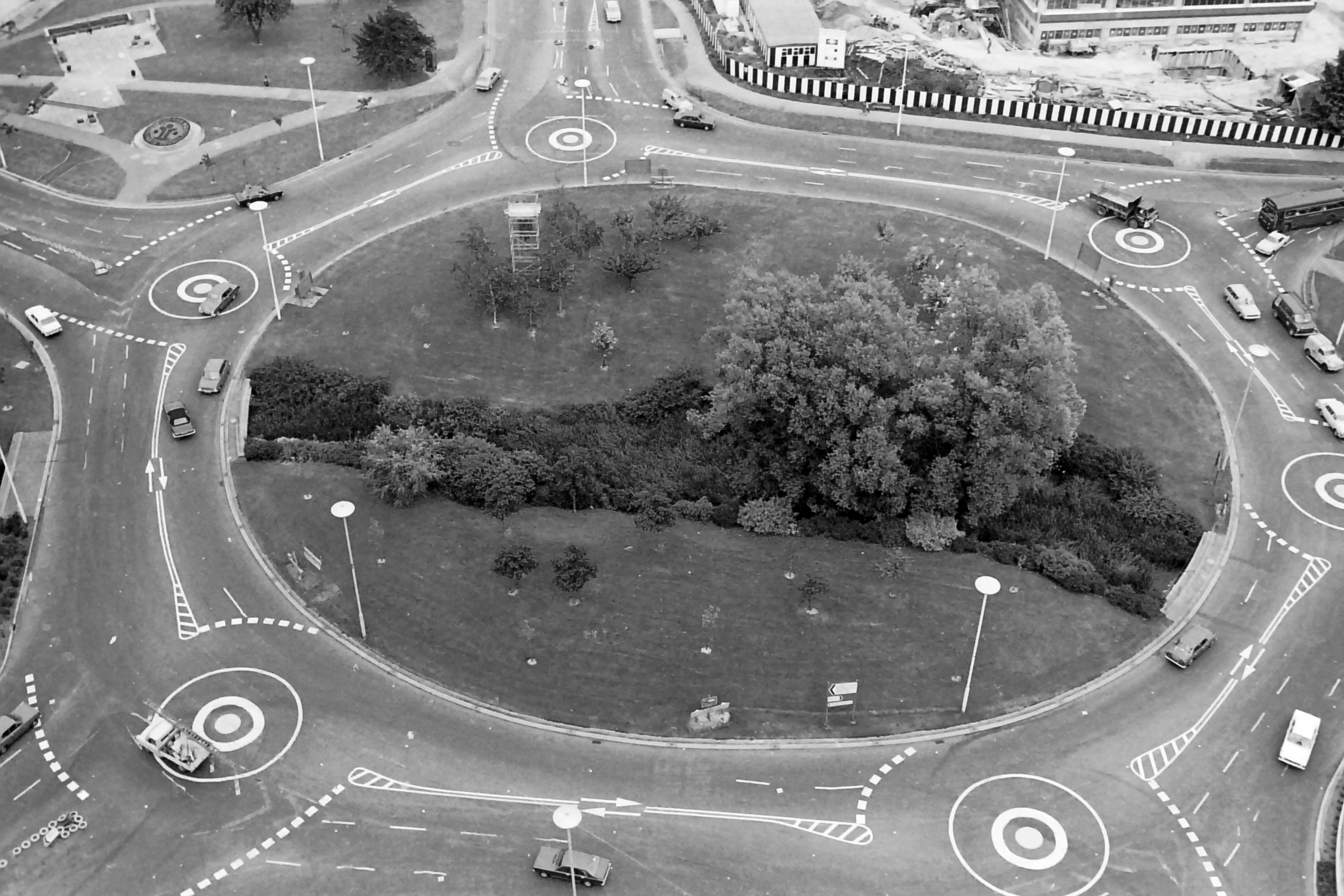
The "Magic Roundabout" in Hemel Hempstead

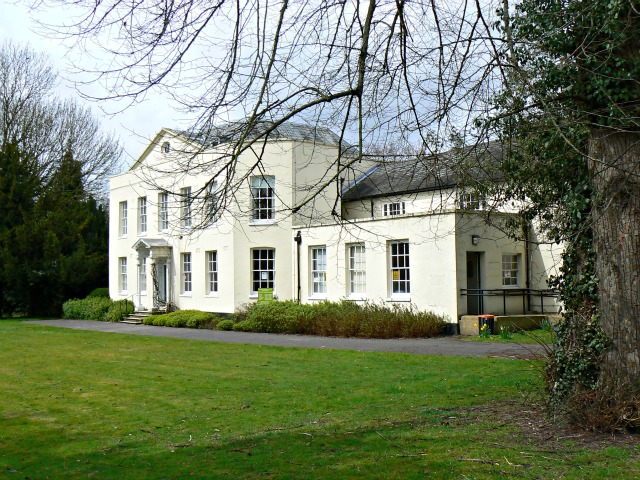
The Bury, proposed as a Dacorum museum

Hemel is famous for its "Magic Roundabout" (officially called the Plough Roundabout from a former adjacent public house), an interchange at the end of the town centre (Moor End), where traffic from six routes meet. Traffic is able to circulate in both directions around what appears to be a main central roundabout (which it used to be), with the normal rules applying at each of the six mini-roundabouts encircling this central reservation. It was the first such circulation system in Britain.

Hemel claims to have the first purpose-built, free-standing multi-storey car park in Britain.

The new town centre is laid out alongside landscaped gardens and water features formed from the River Gade known as the Watergardens, designed by G.A. Jellicoe. The Watergardens are home to many ducks, which have been known to cause delays on the surrounding roads. The main shopping street, Marlowes, was pedestrianised in the early 1990s.

For many years, the lower end of Marlowes featured a distinctive office building built as a bridge-like structure straddling the main road. This building was erected on the site of an earlier railway viaduct carrying the Hemel to Harpenden railway, known as the Nickey Line. When the new town was constructed, this part of the railway was no longer in use and the viaduct was demolished. The trackbed is now used as a leisure route by walkers. The office building, occupied by BP, was designed to create a similar skyline and effect to the viaduct. In the early 1980s, it was discovered that the building was subsiding dangerously; as a result, it was vacated and demolished. Adjacent to the BP buildings was a unique, double-helix public car park. The lower end of Marlowes was redeveloped into the Riverside shopping complex, which opened on 27 October 2005.

A few metres away is Hemel's tallest structure, the 20-storey Kodak building. This originally consisted of 18 office floors, two plantroom floors and a basement. It also had a two-storey annex containing a restaurant, cinema and gym. Built as the Kodak Company's UK HQ, the tower was vacated by the company in 2005, though it was temporarily reoccupied in 2006 after the Buncefield explosion destroyed Kodak's other Hemel offices. It has since been converted into flats.

The Heathrow Airport holding area, known as the Bovingdon stack, lies just west of the town. At peak times on a clear day, several circling aircraft can be seen in the sky at any one time.

The national headquarters of the Boys' Brigade is located at Felden Lodge, near Hemel.

Dacorum Heritage, a local history advocacy group, has proposals to convert the 18th-century house at The Bury into a museum and art gallery to display a collection of archaeological and historical artefacts from the surrounding area. The project is currently awaiting necessary funding and planning permission to proceed.

== Notable events ==
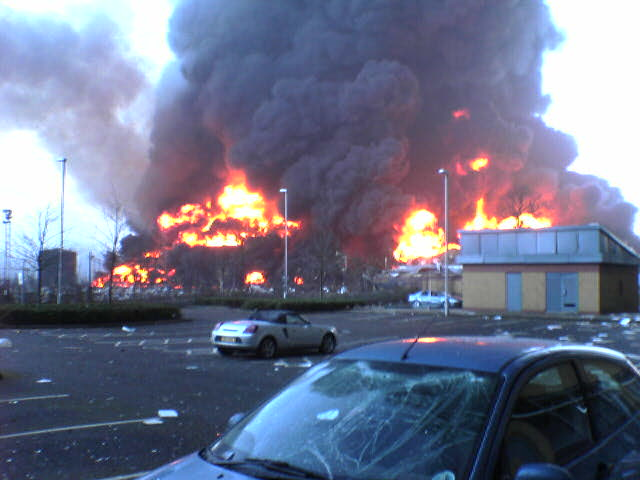
Buncefield fire in December 2005

In December 2005, there was a series of explosions and fires at Buncefield oil depot.

This was widely reported as the largest explosion in peacetime Europe by many media organisations, although verification of the claim is scant.

== Sport ==
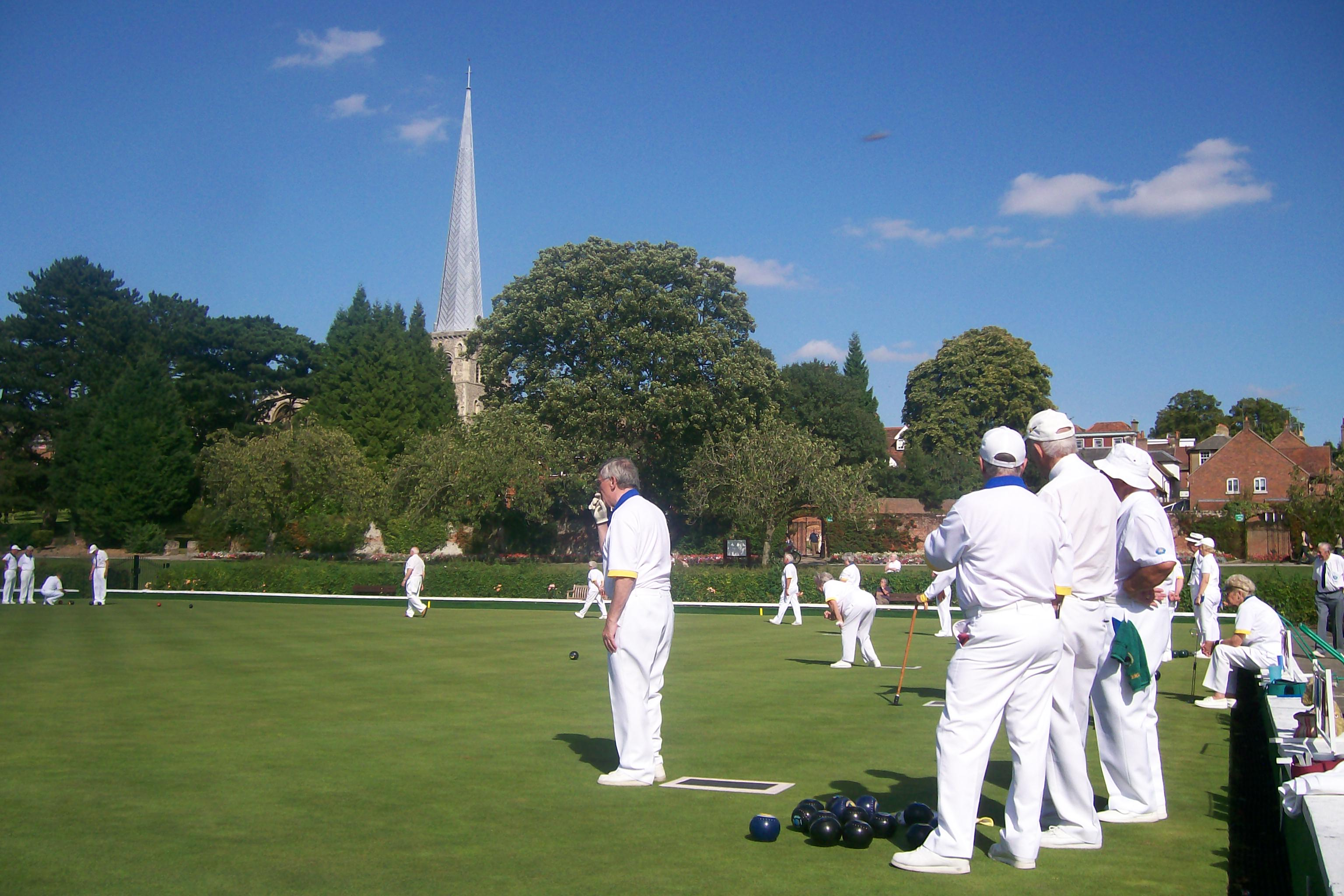
Playing bowls at Gadebridge Park

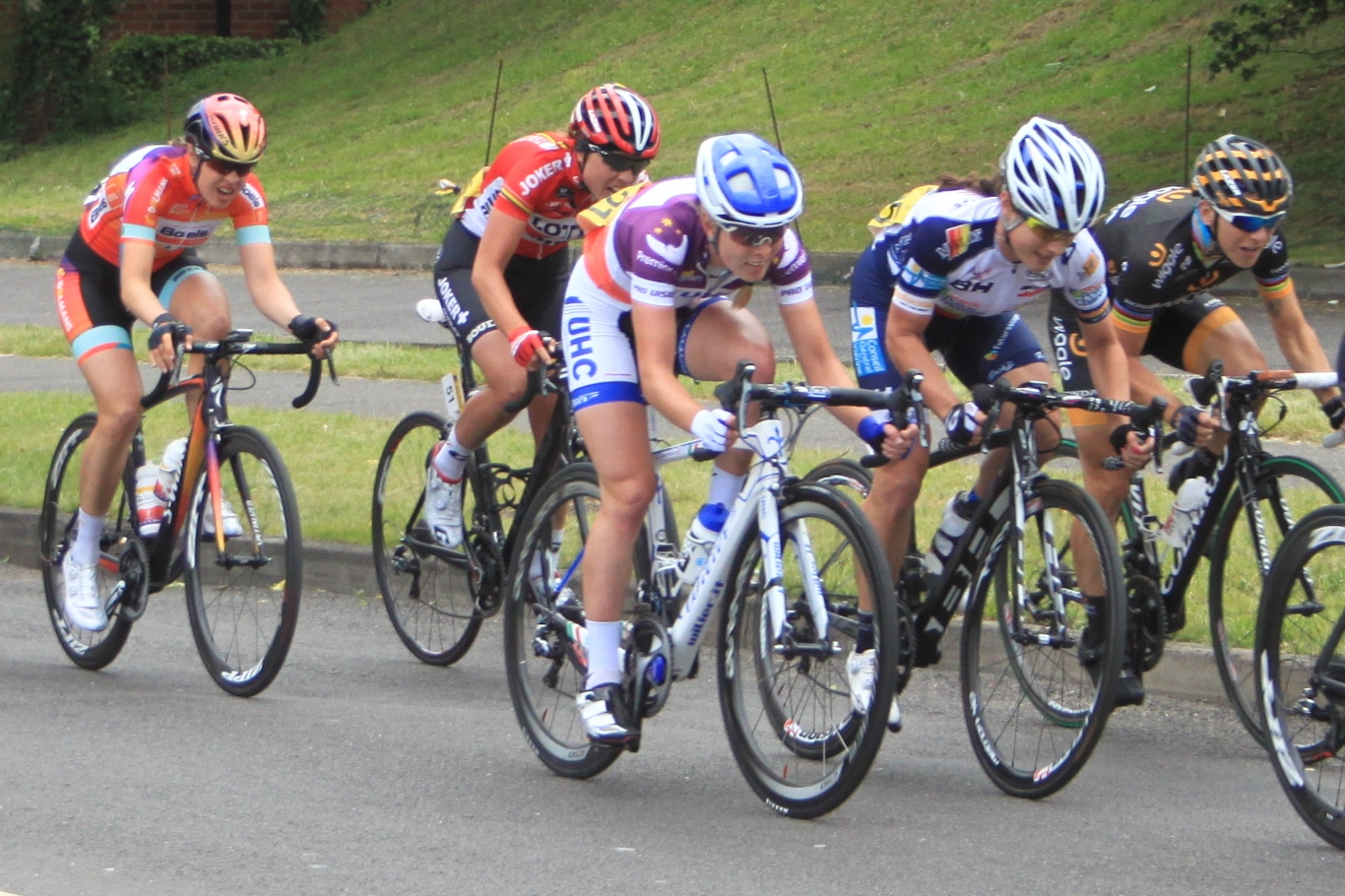
2015 Women's Tour stage five enters Hemel Hempstead

Hemel Hempstead Town FC was formed in 1885 and the team now plays in the National League South. Nicknamed The Tudors, it is based at Vauxhall Road, in the Adeyfield area of the town; this was the site of the former sports club for the employees of Brocks Fireworks. There are also many amateur sides throughout the town.

In rugby league, Hemel Stags was founded in 1981 and was admitted to the third-tier RFL League 1 in the 2013 season. However, in 2019 the club was purchased by a Canadian consortium and relocated to Ottawa, being readmitted to the league for the 2021 season under the name Ottawa Aces.

Hemel Hempstead (Camelot) Rugby Club is a rugby union club founded in 1919. The club plays in London 2 North West, a seventh-tier league in the English rugby union league system. Its home ground is at Chaulden Lane, Chaulden.

Hemel Hempstead Town Cricket Club, founded in 1850, has a pitch and practice facilities at Heath Park, near the town centre. The Boxmoor Cricket Club, founded in 1857, has a ground nearby on Blackbirds Moor. The town is also home to Leverstock Green Cricket Club.

The town has a real snow indoor sports venue that opened in April 2009; it offers a range of indoor snow-based sports and activities.

Dacorum & Tring Athletic Club is based at Jarman Park, while Hemel Hempstead Bowls Club has its greens at Gadebridge Park. The park also has an outdoor skatepark that was designed and supplied by local extreme sports fanatics ‘'Hemel Skates’', after earning £65,000 through fundraising.

Leverstock Green Tennis Club provides courts and coaching for members, and other courts are available in public parks. There are private indoor facilities at Hemel Indoor Tennis Centre at Abbot's Hill School, Nash Mills.

The local authority provides the infrastructure for several of the sports mentioned above. In addition, there is a sports centre at Boxmoor and shared public facilities at a number of secondary schools, provided via Sportspace. These provide multi-purpose courts (included badminton and basketball), gymnasia and swimming pools. There are also private members only gymnasia.

There are two 18-hole golf courses just outside the south-western edge of the town. One is in the grounds of Shendish Manor and the other, Little Hay is off Box Lane, on Box Moor Trust land. There was also a nine-hole course (Boxmoor) on Box Lane but this closed in July 2011 and is now a nature reserve being part of the Box Moor Trust estate.

Wildcards Roller Hockey Club was established in 1996 and is a non-profit organisation run by volunteers to enable people to play Inline Hockey in Hertfordshire.

Jarman Park had a ten pin bowling alley, ice skating, and a swimming pool with slides until they closed at the end of 2013. The only facility left in Jarman Park is the XC, an extreme sport centre with indoor skate boarding, rock climbing, bowls and potholing facilities. Close to Jarman Park is the Snow Centre, the UK's largest indoor ski slope.

Hemel Hempstead has several swimming clubs, the most notable of which is Hemel Hempstead Swimming Club. The town also hosts the FIFOLITS Swimming club and the Dacorum Borough Swimming Squad, which bring together the best swimmers in the borough.

Competitive cycling events such as the Tour of Britain Men's and Tour of Britain Women's have occasionally had stages that have gone through the town.

Hemel Storm is a basketball team that competes in the second-tier National Basketball League (England) Division 1. It plays its home games at Sportspace.

Herts Baseball Club has been based in Grovehill since 1997. It has two purpose-built baseball diamonds, with permanent fencing. Herts is one of the biggest clubs in the country and has won national titles at both adult and junior levels.

== Local media ==
Hemel Hempstead lies within the BBC London and ITV London regions. Television signals are received from the Crystal Palace TV transmitter and the local relay transmitter.

Local radio stations are BBC Three Counties Radio on 92.1 FM, Heart Hertfordshire on 96.6 FM and Radio Dacorum, a community-based radio station.

The Hemel Hempstead Gazette, Hemel Today and Herald Express are the town's local newspapers.

Hemel also was home to one of the first community-based television stations, West Herts TV, which later became Channel 10.

== Art and culture ==
=== In popular culture ===
- The 1957 sci-fi horror film Quatermass 2 used Hemel Hempstead, at the time under development, for the fictional new town of Winnerden Flats.
- The 1990s BBC crime comedy-drama television series Pie in the Sky used the town for the fictional restaurant.
- The 2001 erotic comedy thriller film Birthday Girl featured Hemel prominently.
- The 2012 television film adaptation of the David Walliams' book Mr Stink was filmed in Hemel.
- Several scenes from the Netflix black comedy-drama television series After Life were filmed in the town.
- Some scenes from the science fiction adventure film Project Hail Mary were filmed in Hemel.
- Button House, the primary setting of the 2019 BBC sitcom Ghosts, is shown in one scene to lie in Hemel Hempstead; whilst filming actually occurred at West Horsley Place in Surrey.

=== Public art ===
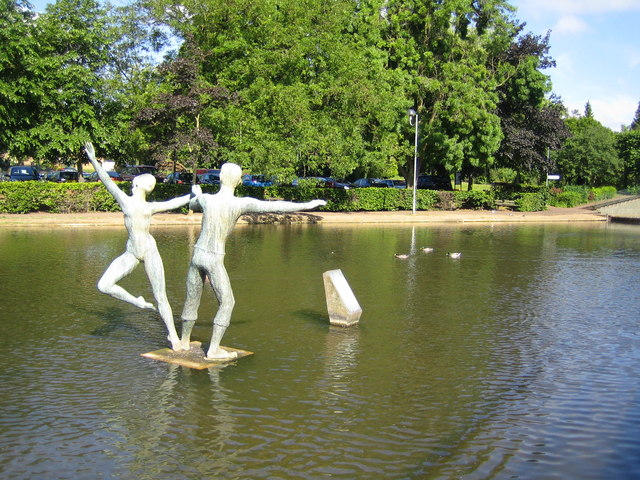
Rock & Rollers (Hubert Yencess, 1962)

The new town centre contains several sculptures by notable artists from the 1950s, including a 1955 stone mural by sculptor Alfred Gerrard entitled Stages in the Development of Man. There is also the Rock & Rollers sculpture, created by the French artist, Hubert Yencess, which originally stood outside Bank Court but has been moved to the water gardens; there is a fountain called Water Play.

The mosaic tiled map of the Hemel Hempstead district was designed by the artist Rowland Emett and is located on the side of the tiered car park in the Marlowes. Erected in 1960, it is grade-II listed building.

A concrete and glass rainbow sculpture, Residents' Rainbow by Californian artist Colin Lambert, was installed in the Marlowes in 1993. The ceramic rainbow tiling was replaced with a glass mosaic by artist Gary Drostle in 2010. Nearby is a 3D map of 1940s Hemel.

In 2008, an abstract stone sculpture by Timothy Shutter, entitled A Point for Reflection, was unveiled outside the Riverside Shopping Centre.

A series of 33-feet-high blue steel arches, called the Phoenix Gateway, is located on the roundabout closest to the Hemel Hempstead junction of the M1 motorway. The concept behind the installation was to help regenerate the town after the Buncefield fire with a striking piece of commercial art. It was funded by the East of England Development Agency.

=== Theatre ===
==== The Dacorum Pavilion ====
The Dacorum Pavilion was a theatre and performance venue and a 1960s structure, which was sited on the Marlowes, just in front of the library. It was an entertainment venue that hosted emerging and internationally famous acts between the 1960s and 1990s. The venue was closed and was demolished in 2002. According to local media reports, Dacorum Borough Council decided it was "becoming increasingly unsuitable to meet the leisure needs of the local community." A memorial service was held on the tenth anniversary of its closure. The Forum, Hemel's new council, library and voluntary services hub built on the former Pavilion site opened its doors to the public on 16 January 2013.

==== The Hemel Hempstead Theatre Company ====
Originally known as The Hemel Hempstead Operatic and Dramatic Society, The Hemel Hempstead Theatre Company has operated since 1925. Over the years, the company has performed in a number of locations, including the Luxor Cinemas in the Marlowes and St. John's Hall at 72 St. John's Road, which had been built in 1930 as extension of the nearby St. John's Church. The first-ever theatrical performance at St. John's Hall was given by the Theatre Company in April 1932. HHTC purchased the St. John's Hall building in 1997 and renamed it the Boxmoor Playhouse. Holding up to 200 seats, the Playhouse is the largest theatre in the town.

Each year, the Company stages a variety of productions, including plays, musicals and pantomimes. Due to the flexibility of the space, the company also holds social events such as quiz nights, creative workshops and cabaret evenings.

== Twinned towns ==
The town, as part of the Borough of Dacorum, is twinned with Neu-Isenburg in Germany.

== Notable people ==
Notable people associated with the town in order of birth date:

- Richard Field (1561–1616), a theologian associated with the founding of the Anglican Church, was born in Hemel Hempstead.
- Sir Francis Bacon (1561–1626), Lord of the manor of Gorhambury, which included Hemel from 1601.
- Robert Snooks (c. 1761–1802), England's last highwayman to be executed and buried at the scene of his crime, lies here.
- Sir Astley Cooper (1768–1841), English surgeon and anatomist. Lived at Gadebridge House, the grounds of which are now a public park.
- Lefevre James Cranstone (1822–1893), an artist known for his landscape paintings of Antebellum America, was born here.
- John Dickinson (1782–1869), inventor and founder of the paper mills at Apsley, Nash Mills and Croxley Green, which became John Dickinson & Co., built and lived at Abbots Wood, Nash Mills.
- Sir Arthur Evans (1851–1941), archaeologist, was born at the "Red House", Nash Mills
- William John Locke (1863–1930), novelist, dramatist and playwright, best known for his short stories, lived at Corner Hall in the 1900s
- Lyn Harding (1867–1952), actor and film star, lived at a house called Logandene in Tile Kiln Lane, Leverstock Green
- Alice Maria Warren (1882–1973), artist, short story writer, poet and newspaper editor who emigrated to Australia and New Zealand.
- Prince Maurice of Battenberg (1891–1914), grandson of Queen Victoria, was a pupil at Lockers Park School
- Loben Edward Harold Maund (1892–1957), a rear admiral of the Royal Navy and captain of HMS Ark Royal at the time of her sinking in November 1941
- Louis Mountbatten, 1st Earl Mountbatten of Burma (1900–1979), admiral, statesman and an uncle of Prince Philip, Duke of Edinburgh was a pupil at Lockers Park School. The combined Corner Hall boys' and girls' school was named Mountbatten after him and he visited the school for the opening. The school was located on what is now the Jarman Park site
- Guy Burgess, (1911–1963), Russian spy, was a pupil at Lockers Park School
- Ashley George Old, (1913–2001), an artist, spent many months in Hemel Hempstead in 1959 recording the changes as the New Town evolved
- Salem Hanna Khamis (1919–2005), a Palestinian economic statistician for the United Nations Food and Agriculture Organisation who helped formalise the Geary-Khamis method of computing purchasing power parity of currencies. In later life, he lived in Hemel and died there
- Sir Roger Moore, (1927–2017), actor, famous for his roles as The Saint and James Bond, lived in Tile Kiln Close, Leverstock Green in the 1960s
- Jean Marian Stevens (1928–2022), poet, writer, playwright and teacher, raised in Boxmoor, Hemel Hempstead and attended Hemel Hempstead Grammar School
- Christopher Trace (1933–1992), first presenter of BBC TV's Blue Peter children's programme, lived for a time in Blacksmiths Row, Leverstock Green
- Michael Bradshaw (1933–2001), Anglo-Canadian actor who grew up in Boxmoor from 1938 until the mid-1950s
- Bill Morris, Baron Morris of Handsworth (born 1938), former leader of the TGWU, lived in Hemel and still lives within the Borough of Dacorum
- Elaine Taylor (born 1943), actress, born and raised in Hemel Hempstead
- Les Ebdon (born 1947), Vice-Chancellor of the University of Bedfordshire from 2003 to 2012, attended Hemel Hempstead School
- Paul Boateng, (born 1951) Britain's first black Cabinet minister and ambassador to South Africa, attended Apsley Grammar School (now part of Longdean School). He first stood for Parliament in the Hemel Hempstead constituency
- Rob Burns (born 1953), musician, grew up in the town and attended Blessed Cuthbert Mayne School, St. Albert the Great and The Hemel Hempstead School
- Dale Sanders (born 1953), Professor of Biology from 1992 to 2010 at the University of York, attended The Hemel Hempstead School
- Dave Vanian (real name David Lett, born 1956), the lead singer of the Damned, was born and lived in Chaulden
- Magenta Devine (1957–2019), TV presenter, born Kim Taylor, was born in Hemel
- Ian Lygo (born c. 1958), civil servant who made 75 successful appearances on the UK game show 100% in late 1998
- Dougie Brimson (born 1959), author and screenwriter, was born and lives in Hemel
- Matt Dickinson, film-maker, attended The Hemel Hempstead School
- Pallab Ghosh, journalist, attended The Hemel Hempstead School
- Chris Pig (born 1965), internationally respected master printmaker, lived in the town and attended Longdean School
- Claire Skinner (born 1965), actor, was born and raised in Hemel
- Steven Wilson (born 1967), musician, singer, songwriter and record producer who lived in Hemel from the age of six
- Richard Grayson (born 1969), professor and historian, was born in Hemel and attended The Hemel Hempstead School
- Caroline, Lady Dalmeny (born 1969), was born and raised in Hemel
- Frank Carter (born 1984), musician and tattoo artist, who was the vocalist for Gallows, Pure Love and Frank Carter & the Rattlesnakes
- Talulah Riley (born 1985), actress
- Simon Minter (born 1992), YouTuber

=== Sport ===
- James Purves (1937-2022), cricketer
- Malcolm Phipps (born 1942), author, poet and 9th dan international karate instructor, lives in Hemel
- Luke Donald (born 1977), golfer, was born in Hemel
- Anthony Davidson (born 1979), Formula One driver, was born in Hemel
- Tommy W. Smith (born 1980), a footballer who played for Watford in the Football League Championship, was born in the town and attended The Hemel Hempstead School
- Jack Smith (born 1983), footballer, was born in Hemel and attended The Hemel Hempstead School
- Ronnie Henry (born 1984), footballer, was born in the town and attended The Hemel Hempstead School
- Chris Eagles (born 1985), former footballer
- Max Whitlock (born 1993), member of Britain's gymnastics team at the 2012 Summer Olympics in London and double gold medallist at the 2016 Summer Olympics in Rio de Janeiro
- Luke O'Nien (born 1994), footballer playing for Sunderland
- Cauley Woodrow (born 1994), footballer playing for Luton Town
- Harry Winks (born 1996), footballer playing for Leicester City
- Sheyi Ojo (born 1997), footballer playing for Cardiff City
- Brandon Austin (born 1999), footballer.

== Art and photograph gallery ==
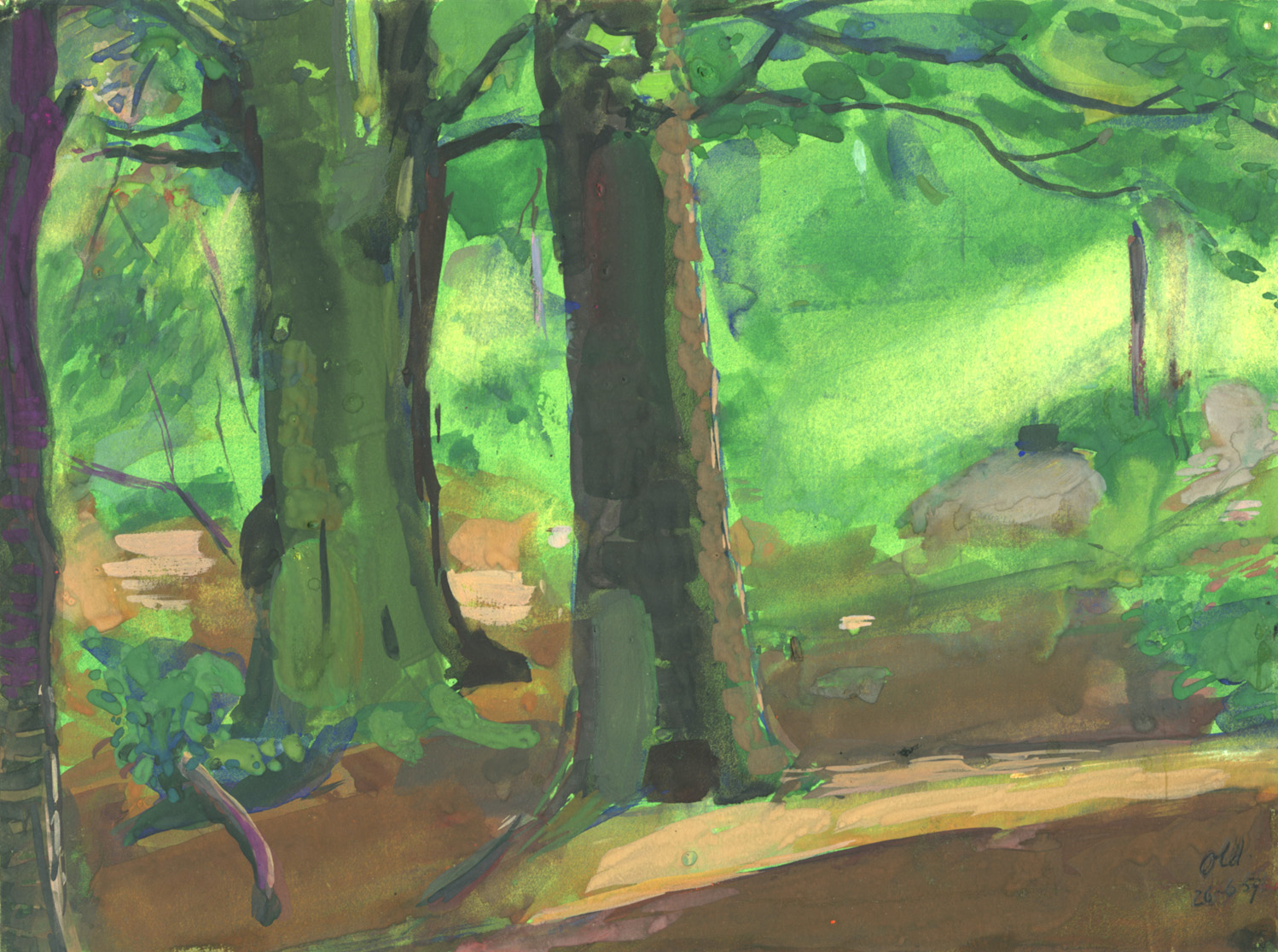
The woods at Cupid's Green, painted by Ashley George Old in 1959

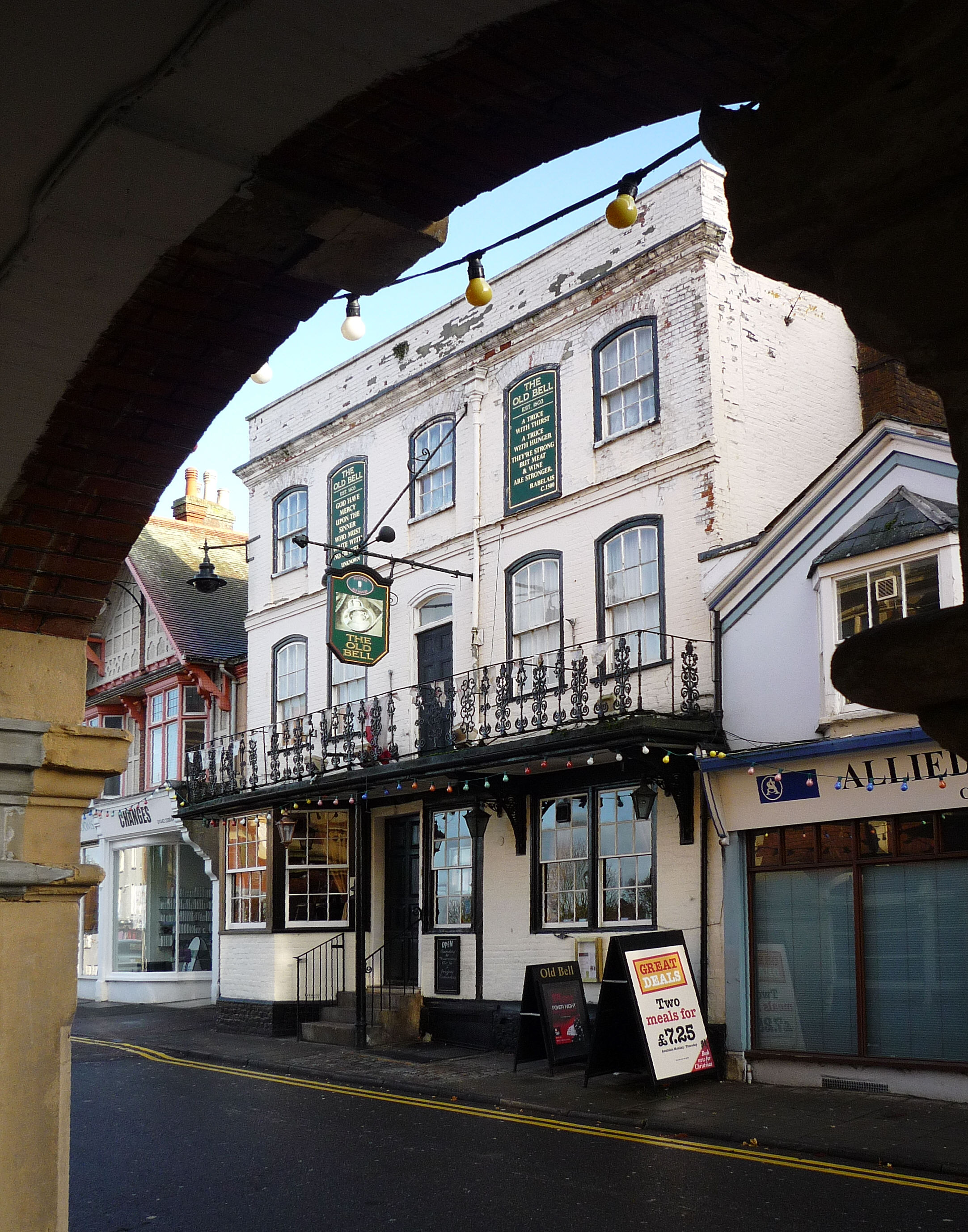
The Old Bell pub in the old town has parts built in 1615, but is on the site of even older inns. Contains some unusual French wallpaper dating back to 1821, which has been cleaned by the Victoria & Albert Museum

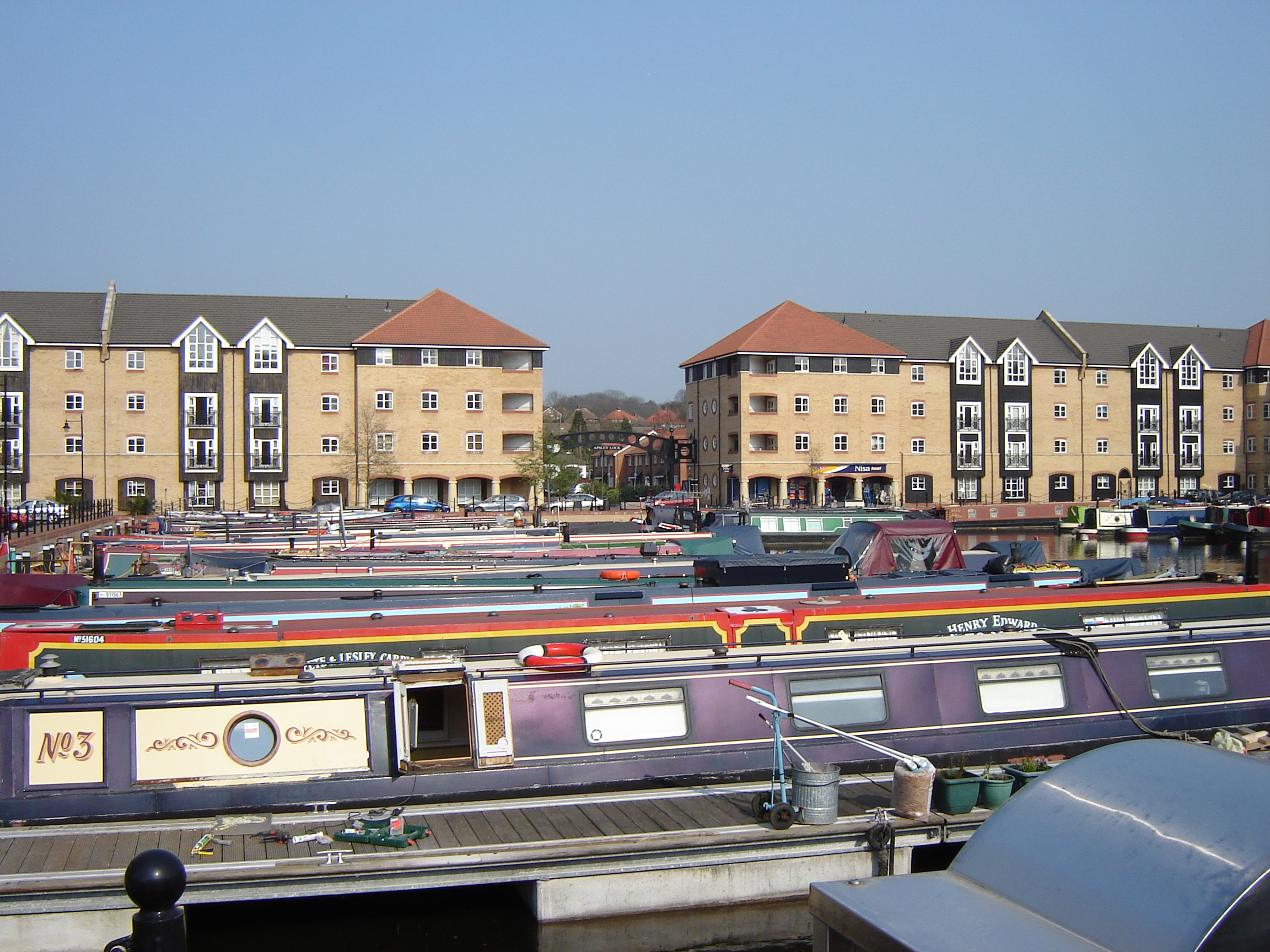
Apsley Marina, built in 2003.

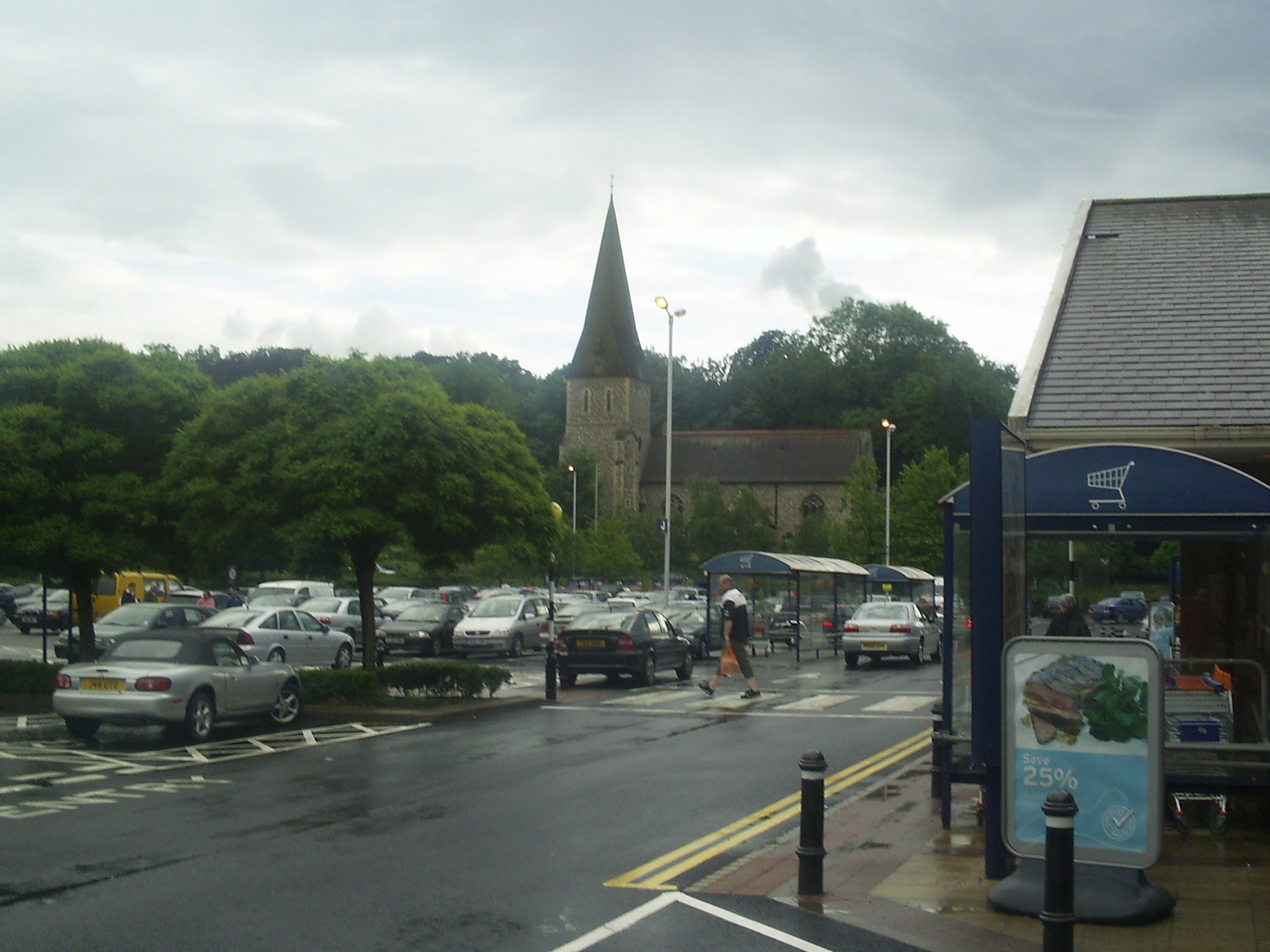
The Church of St Mary's (1871) stands above the modern Sainsbury's supermarket in Apsley

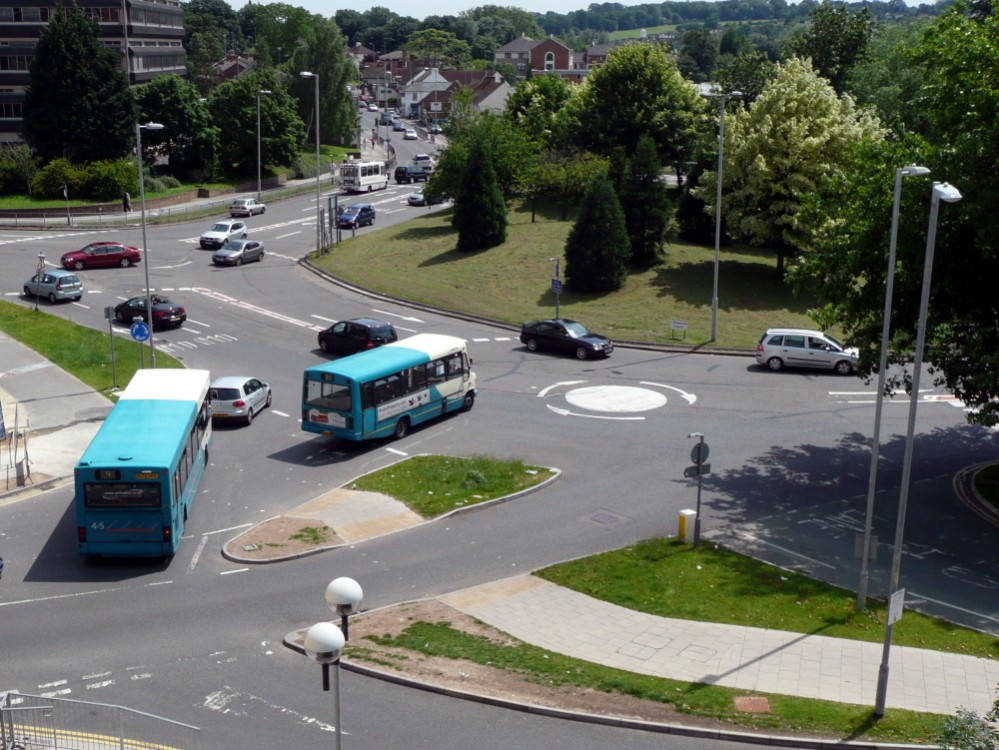
The north-east side of the Magic Roundabout

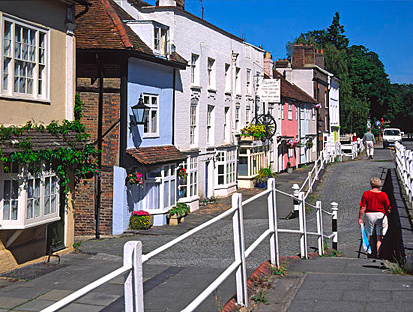
The Old Town

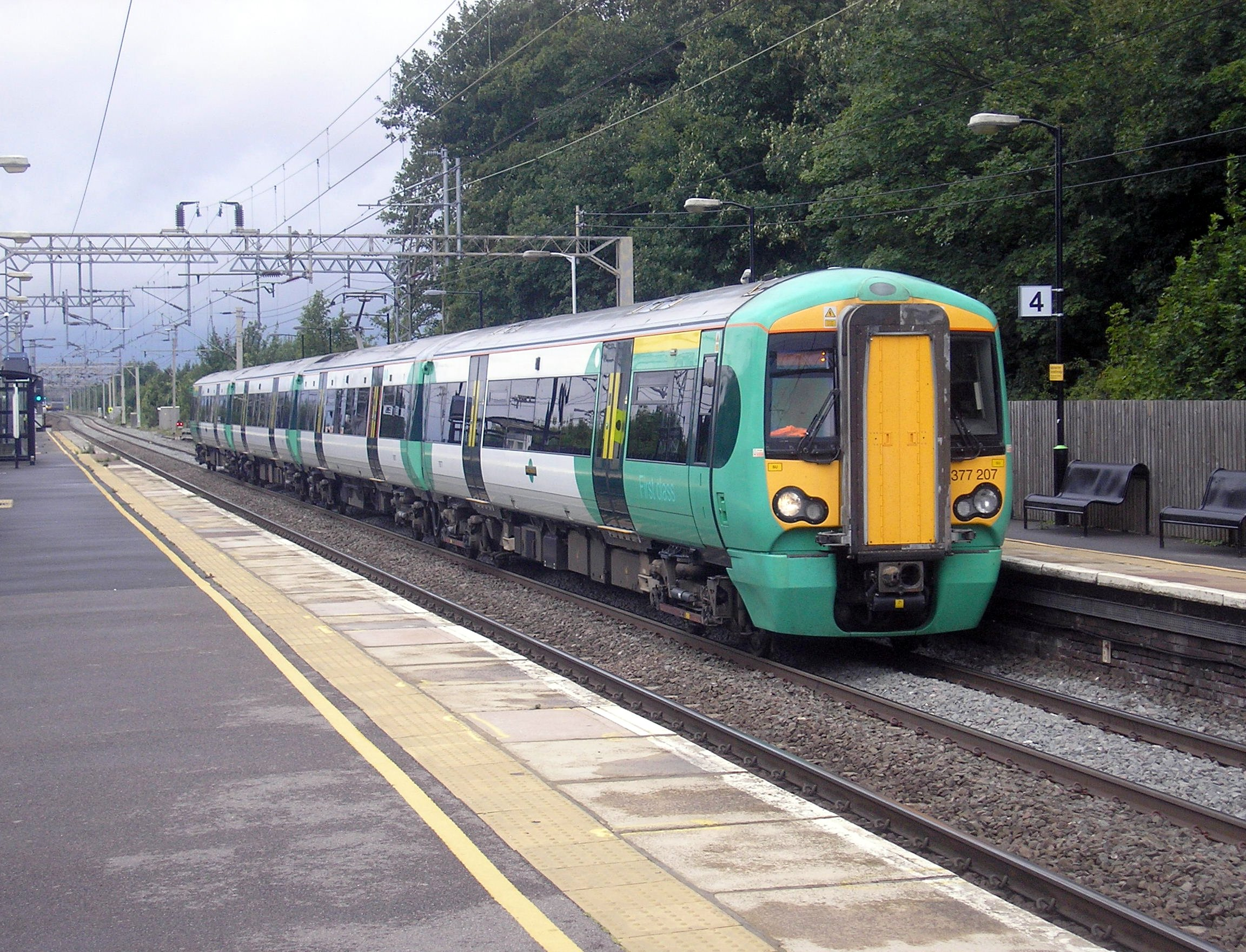
A Southern train at the station

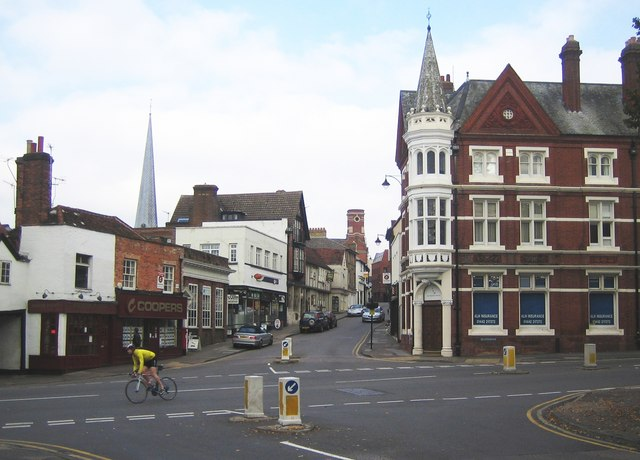
The high street in the Old Town
