= James Purves (cricketer) =

English cricketer (1937–2022)

Personal information
- Full name: James Hamilton Purves
- Born: 4 December 1937; Hemel Hempstead, Hertfordshire, England
- Died: 27 December 2022 (aged 85)
- Batting: Left-handed
- Bowling: Right-arm medium
- Role: Batsman

Domestic team information
- Years: Team
- 1962: Marylebone Cricket Club
- 1960–1961: Essex

Career statistics
Competition	First-class
Matches	11
Runs scored	474
Batting average	24.94
100s/50s	0/4
Top score	74
Catches/stumpings	5/–
- Source: Cricinfo, 25 September 2011

James Hamilton Purves (4 December 1937 – 27 December 2022) was an English cricketer. Purves was a left-handed batsman who bowled right-arm medium pace. He was born in Hemel Hempstead, Hertfordshire and educated at Uppingham School.

Purves made his first-class debut for Essex against Cambridge University in 1960. Following this match he played a first-class fixture for the Free Foresters against Oxford University. The following season he made four further first-class appearances for Essex, the last of which came against Middlesex in the County Championship. He struggled in his five first-class appearances for the county, scoring just 36 runs at an average of 5.14, with a high score of 14. He made a further first-class appearance for the Free Foresters in 1961, followed this up in 1962 by making two more for the team. Also in 1962, Purves made his only first-class appearance for the Marylebone Cricket Club against Cambridge University. In 1964, he made his final first-class appearance for the Free Foresters against Oxford University. He fared better with the bat for the Free Foresters, scoring 422 runs in his five matches at an average of 42.20, with a high score of 74. This score, which was one of four fifties he made for the club, came against Cambridge University in 1962.
