= Malcolm Phipps =

British karateka

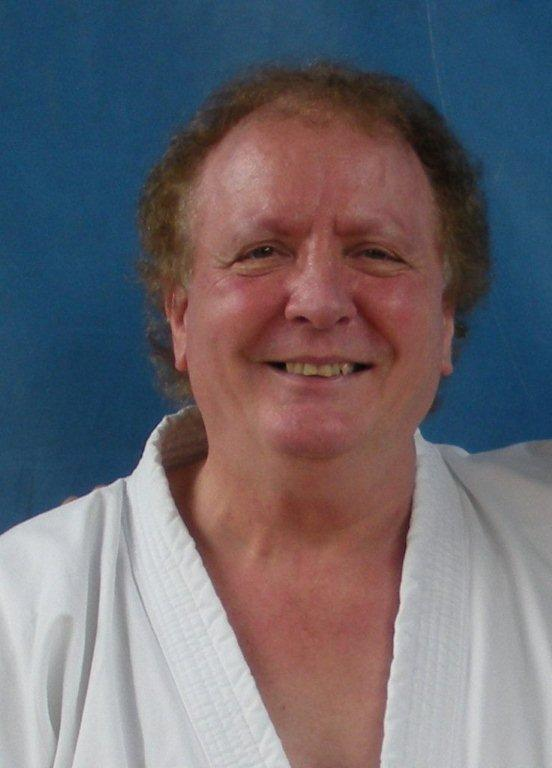
- Born: Torquay, England
- Style: Shotokan Karate
- Teachers: Hirokazu Kanazawa, Shiro Asano
- Rank: 9th dan karate

Other information
- Website: sski.org

Malcolm Phipps is an English martial artist. He is a 9th Dan Hanshi in Shotokan Karate and is the chief instructor internationally to Seishinkai Shotokan Karate International (SSKI). He started training in karate in the early seventies with a local JKA club, then with Shotokan Karate International (SKI) with Hirokazu Kanazawa. He then moved on to the Amateur Shotokan Karate Association (ASKA), eventually leaving to form his own association, Seishinkai Shotokan Karate, in 1984 and finally turning international in 1995 to the group as it is today, SSKI, with clubs in England, the US, Kazakhstan and India. He was an advisory board member of the World Traditional Karate Organisation from 2003–2013.

== Early years ==
Born in December 1942 in Torquay, Devon, due to wartime evacuation, Phipps then moved with his mother to Wealdstone to live with his grandparents, spending his formative years there attending Belmont First School. It was during this time that Phipps started his lifelong support of Wolverhampton Wanderers F.C. In 1953, the family then moved to Hemel Hempstead where Phipps attended Adeyfield Secondary Modern, finally leaving school in 1957. He started working at John Dickinsons, later joining the Royal Navy. After his initial training at HMS Ganges in Shotley, Suffolk where he learnt to be a communications rating in the Visual Signalling Department, and after several incidents of note including learning to march and learning to swim he passed his exams and went to serve on his first ship, the Battle Class Destroyer, HMS Dunkirk. Several ships followed including HMS Rhyl, HMS Aisne, HMS Warrior, HMS Decoy, HMS Delight, HMS Mercury and HMS Jufair, finally leaving the RN in 1968. In his youth Phipps was a prominent football player and played soccer for RN teams throughout the world and in 1966 was actually on the books of Tring Town FC. Once out of the RN, Phipps initially worked for a telecommunications temp agency, gaining full-time employment with a merchant bank (Bunge & Co) working in their communications department. After five years with them, Phipps moved on to work for a commodities broker, Wilson Smithett & Cope; and it was during this time he started his first karate club.

== Karate years ==
Phipps began his karate training in the early seventies with the JKA/SKI training with Kanazawa (SKI) and John van Weenen MBE. He then trained with ASKA, before setting up his own association Seishinkai Shotokan Karate in 1984, which eventually become SSKI in 1995. Throughout his karate life, he has trained in the Shotokan karate style and also took up traditional nunchaku, forming the English Traditional Nunchaku Association (ETNA) in 2003 and is the world-wide Chief Instructor and founder of both SSKI and ETNA. Phipps is also a member of the Independent Traditional Karate Organisation (www.itko.info) and the Shotokan Alliance. He was awarded his 4th Dan in March 1986 (specially awarded by the World Union of Karate Organisations (WUKO) and the English Karate Council for services to karate nationally and internationally) and finally awarded his 8th Dan in September 2011. He has also been awarded a National Referees Certificate (1981), an NCF(MAC) Coaches award (1986), an EKGB Senior Coaching Award (1992) and is authorised as an EKGB Coaching Assessor (1993).

Phipps has coached many national and international champions. This has led, in turn to him being awarded 'Sports Personality of the Year' for West Herts (Dacorum) 1985, being runner-up for 'Sports Personality of the Year (Coach)' for West Herts (Dacorum) 2001 and being Highly Commended 'Service to Sport' for Dacorum District/West Herts 2002. Phipps has also had several magazine articles published, including some in Shotokan Karate Magazine and in both Traditional Karate and Combat Magazine and also several books (see details below).

Further highlights to Phipps's karate career include:

- August 2003 – Inducted into the USA Martial Arts Hall of Fame (Dallas, Texas)
- November 2003 – Made Joint Chairman of the WTKO Advisory Panel in New York
- August 2004 – Made Founding Fellow of the ISKS (International Shotokan-Ryu Karate-Do Shihankai) and granted the Shogo (title) of Kyoshi
- August 2007 – Inducted into the Global Martial Arts Hall of Fame (Indianapolis, Indiana)

== Books ==
Phipps is also an author and has had nine books published to date. Four of these books are on the martial arts: Uchi Deshi and the Master, The Ah So! Stories, The Little Book of Seishinkai and Nunchaku (an in-house training manual) and three novels: Wild Oats in Cornwall, The ConEquest and Wild Oats. His autobiography, Out of the Tiger's Mouth, was published in December 2009 and in 2013 he had a book of poems published, I Pondered Lonely as a Cloud, where all the proceeds were donated to the NSPCC. In 2014 a follow-up poetry book was published, I Pondered Lonely as a Cloud, once more! where all the proceeds went to, Save the Children.

- Phipps, Malcolm (1992). Uchi Dechi and The Master. eMPi Publishing. ISBN 0-9519835-0-4.
- Phipps, Malcolm (1992). Wild Oats in Cornwall. Book Guild, Limited. ISBN 0-86332-690-0.
- Phipps, Malcolm (1999). The Ah So! Stories. St Ives Printing & Publishing Co. ISBN 0-948385-32-4.
- Phipps, Malcolm (1999). The ConEquest. St Ives Printing & Publishing Co. ISBN 0-948385-31-6.
- Phipps, Malcolm (1999). The Little Book of Seishinkai. eMPi Publishing. ASIN B002WN1HS2.
- Phipps, Malcolm (2006). Wild Oats. eMPi Publishing. ISBN 0-9519835-1-2.
- Phipps, Malcolm (2009). Out of the Tiger's Mouth. eMPi Publishing. ISBN 978-0-9519835-2-2.
- Phipps, Malcolm (2013). I Pondered Lonely as a Cloud. eMPi Publishing. ISBN 978-0-9519835-3-9.
- Phipps, Malcolm (2014). I Pondered Lonely as a Cloud, once more!. eMPi Publishing. ISBN 978-0-9519835-4-6.
- Phipps, Malcolm (2025). The Master of Penwith. eMPi Publishing. ISBN 978-0-9519835-5-3.
