= Nash Mills =

Civil parish in Hertfordshire, England

Coordinates: 51.73°N 0.451°W

- Nash Mills local shopping parade, known as The Denes.

- Location within Hertfordshire
- Population: 2,428 (2011 Census)
- OS grid reference: TL0505
- Civil parish: Nash Mills
- District: Dacorum
- Shire county: Hertfordshire
- Region: East
- Country: England
- Sovereign state: United Kingdom
- Post town: HEMEL HEMPSTEAD
- Postcode district: HP3
- Dialling code: 01442
- Police: Hertfordshire
- Fire: Hertfordshire
- Ambulance: East of England
- UK Parliament: Hemel Hempstead

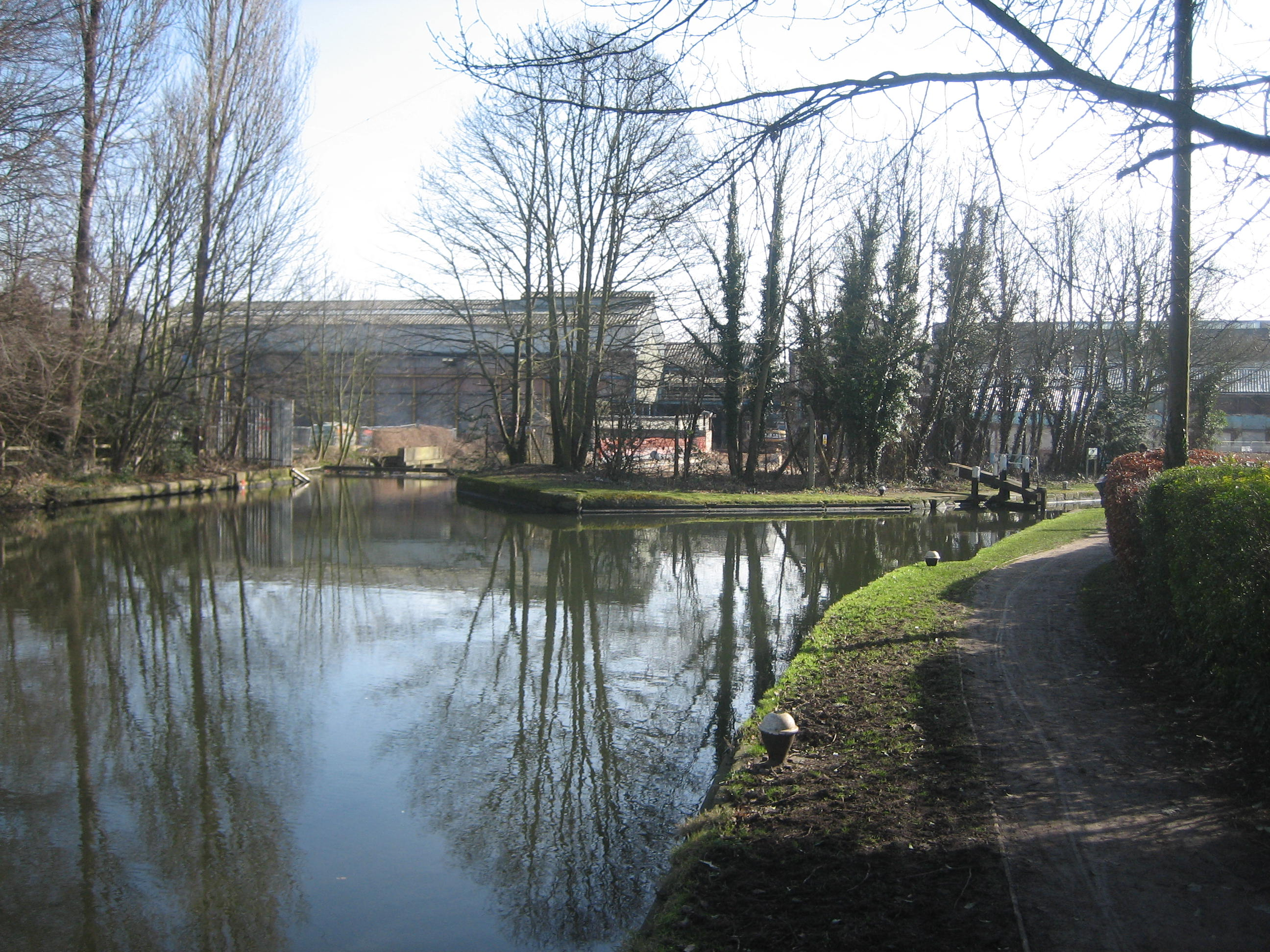
The Nash Mill paper mill seen from the Grand Union Canal

Sign welcoming visitors to Nash Mills, on Barnacres Road.

Nash Mills is a civil parish within Hemel Hempstead and Dacorum Borough Council on the northern side of the Grand Union Canal, formerly the River Gade, and in the southernmost corner of Hemel Hempstead. There is evidence of a mill in this location since the 11th century and the row of 16th century mill cottages still remain. John Dickinson established a number of papermaking mills in the area in the 19th century (Nash Mill).

The parish of Nash Mills was created in 1974 from that part of the parish of Abbots Langley within the designated area of Hemel Hempstead New Town. The parish was enlarged in 1985. The borough council ward extends beyond the parish boundary.

== The Mill ==
A corn-mill in the area was recorded in the Domesday Book in the 11th century; it subsequently belonged, in the Middle Ages, to the Abbey of St Albans. The mill had been converted to papermaking in the late 18th century and subsequently purchased in 1811 by John Dickinson and George Longman.

Nash Mill was renowned for its production of tough thin paper for Samuel Bagster's "Pocket Reference Bible". A major fire in 1813 was a setback, but the insurance enabled redevelopment for large scale production. After an experiment in 1887, fine rag paper was produced on electrically driven machines: a successful innovation at Nash Mill.

In 1989, Nash Mill was sold to the international Sappi Group and continued to make paper until 2006, when it was closed down and sold. Redevelopment plans for housing were publicised in September 2007. By late 2010, the Mill site had been largely cleared, leaving the mill house, Stephenson's Cottage and the war memorial.

== Local history ==
John Dickinson had Nash Mills School built in 1847.

== Governance ==
The Nash Mills area was part of the parish of Abbots Langley until 1974. This northern section of Abbots Langley parish was included within the designated area of Hemel Hempstead New Town in 1947. Under the Local Government Act 1972 the parish of Abbots Langley was split, with the part within Hemel Hempstead New Town becoming the parish of Nash Mills in the new district of Dacorum, and the rest of Abbots Langley parish becoming part of the new district of Three Rivers. A shadow parish council for Nash Mills was elected in 1973 ahead of the boundary changes coming into effect on 1 April 1974.

Nash Mills parish was enlarged on 1 April 1985, gaining an area along the River Gade and Grand Union Canal from Abbots Langley parish. The West Coast Main Line railway passes through the western edge of the parish between Kings Langley and Apsley stations. An original skew bridge, built in 1837 and Grade II listed, carries it over the canal, which marks the border with Abbots Langley.

== Notable residents ==
- Arthur Evans, the archaeologist and excavator of Knossos.
- Sir John Evans, archaeologist, and father of Arthur Evans.

== See also ==
- Abbot's Hill School
- Apsley, Hertfordshire
- John Dickinson Stationery Limited
