= Primary schools in Dacorum =

Schools in Hertfordshire, England

Dacorum within Hertfordshire

This article gives brief information on schools that cater for pupils up to the age of 11 in the Dacorum district of Hertfordshire, England. Most are county maintained primary schools, sometimes known as "junior mixed infant" (JMI). A small number are voluntary aided church schools or independent (fee-paying). The Local Education Authority is Hertfordshire County Council.

Before the mid-20th century, the area contained a scattering of villages, with places such as Apsley, Hemel Hempstead, Berkhamsted and Tring on the Gade and Bulbourne rivers. During the 19th century a Church of England national school was established in each town and village, supplemented by non-denominational British schools in Apsley, Hemel Hempstead and Berkhamsted. After the Elementary Education Act 1870 (33 & 34 Vict. c. 75), the British schools and some of the national schools passed to the control of school boards, while the remaining national schools were aided.

Schools across Hertfordshire were used as billets for soldiers during World War I, greatly disrupting their work. The population of several of the smaller villages declined in the inter-war years, and the smaller schools were closed in the late 1930s. The post-war years saw rapid expansion of the towns, especially Hemel Hempstead, which was designated as one of the first new towns. Many new schools were built at this time.

== Hemel Hempstead ==
When school boards were abolished by the Education Act 1902, Hemel Hempstead was the only part of the county to exercise its right to act as an elementary education authority.

The town was designated one of the first wave of new towns in 1947, leading to a rapid expansion the small market town that swallowed neighbouring villages such as Apsley, Boxmoor and Leverstock Green. Most of the primary schools in the town date from this time.

Roman Catholic primary schools in the area serve as feeder schools to John F Kennedy Catholic School.

After a review of primary places in the town, the county council decided to amalgamate 3 pairs of schools in 2008.

=== South-east ===
Name	Faith	Type	Gov	Opened	Intake	DCSF number	Ofsted number	Web	Coordinates
Belswains	–	Primary	CY	1949	30	2466	117365	W	51.7379°N 0.4540°W
Chambersbury	–	Primary	CY	1954	30	2210	117214	W	51.7389°N 0.4444°W
Hobbs Hill Wood	–	Primary	CY	1953	60	2469	117368	W	51.7437°N 0.4432°W
Leverstock Green	CE	Primary	VC	1931	30	3054	117416	W	51.7503°N 0.4291°W
Lime Walk	–	Primary	CY		30	2422	117333	W	51.7451°N 0.4558°W
Nash Mills	CE	Primary	VA	1847	30	3302	117418	W	51.7319°N 0.4539°W
Reddings	–	Primary	CY		30	2251	117234	W	51.7450°N 0.4514°W
St Albert the Great	RC	Primary	VA		30	3391	117471	W	51.7471°N 0.4460°W
Tudor	–	Primary	CY		30	2045	117109	W	51.7462°N 0.4635°W
Two Waters	–	Primary	CY	c. 1850	30	2044	117108	W	51.7334°N 0.4714°W
Woodfield	–	Special	CY			7025	117682	W	51.7452°N 0.4352°W

In the 19th century this area contained a number of mill towns along the River Gade. Nash Mills C of E Primary School was founded in 1847 by John Dickinson, who owned the local paper mills. The original flint built buildings still stand on Belswains Lane, adjacent to the modern site. Little is known about the school's early years; the early records may have been destroyed when the mill's offices were bombed during World War II. The earliest written record of the School is dated 1871.

Two Waters Primary School was originally a British school, founded by Non-conformists in the mid-19th century and was subsequently moved to the northern edge of Apsley, at the confluence of the Gade and River Bulbourne in March 1869. It was transferred to the local school board in 1870 and the school expanded into new buildings in 1878. A new school was built in 1913. It serves the Apsley district of Hemel Hempstead and is sited on the edge of the Manor Estate, on the southern edge of the town, where it was relocated in June 1976.

In the 1920s, part of the school was a selective central school. In World War II, evacuees from the cities increased the school roll and a double shift system was introduced to manage the numbers in the existing space. In 1941, Two Waters School absorbed the pupils of Wordsworth Junior Infants School from London.

Another early school was Apsley Manor School, which operated on Thorpe Street (now Avia Close) from 1857 until it was replaced by Belswains Primary School in 1949.

Chambersbury Primary School is located off Hill Common and also borders on Chambersbury Lane. The larger site includes Longdean School and Hobbs Hill Primary, but fencing has been installed to define each school's site and to deter use as a throughway. It serves part of the Bennetts End district of Hemel Hempstead.

Hobbs Hill Wood Primary School was completed in 1953 and was named after the woods that pre-dated the New Town. It serves North End Farm and parts of Bennetts End and Leverstock Green.

Woodfield School is a school for children with severe learning difficulties. It is sited in Leverstock Green and caters for all ages, including the primary age range.

=== North-east ===
Name	Faith	Type	Gov	Opened	Intake	DCSF number	Ofsted number	Web	Coordinates
Aycliffe Drive	–	Primary	CY		45	2426	117335	W	51.7715°N 0.4586°W
Broadfield	–	Primary	CY	1955	60	3991	135339	W	51.7541°N 0.4574°W
Brockswood	–	Primary	CY	1978	30	2448	117349	W	51.7803°N 0.4356°W
George Street	–	Primary	CY	1855	30	2040	117106	W	51.7591°N 0.4685°W
Hammond	–	Primary	CY		30	2337	117282	W	51.7691°N 0.4553°W
Haywood Grove	–	Special	CY	1996		7047	131319	W	51.7756°N 0.4501°W
Hobletts Manor	–	Infant	CY	1952	60	2184	117197	W	51.7589°N 0.4483°W
Hobletts Manor	–	Junior	CY		60	2023	117097	W	51.7586°N 0.4496°W
Holtsmere End	–	Infant	CY	1981	60	2995	117377	W	51.7766°N 0.4415°W
Holtsmere End	–	Junior	CY	1976	60	2427	117336	W	51.7772°N 0.4418°W
Maple Grove	–	Primary	CY	2008	30	3987	135221	W	51.7750°N 0.4498°W
Yewtree	–	Primary	CY	2008	60	3988	135222	W	51.7641°N 0.4601°W

There was a national school in the old town at least as early as 1932, rebuilt on George Street in 1855. In 1878 the infants department moved to Queen Street. The two schools were reunited as George Street Primary School in new building in 1969. There were also British schools in Marlowes from the 1830s until the late 19th century.

In 2007, Brockswood Primary School was one of four primary schools in England that were implicated in malpractice in the National Curriculum assessment tests taken by 11-year-olds. As a result, it was stripped of results in English, maths and science.

Broadfield Primary School was opened in January 2008 as the result of a voluntary amalgamation of the previous Infant and Junior Schools which originally opened in 1955.

In a re-organisation in 2008, Yewtree Primary School was formed from the amalgamation of Jupiter Drive and Bellgate Primary Schools on the Bellgate site. At the same time, Maple Grove Primary School was formed from the amalgamation of Barncroft and Eastbrook schools in the former Eastbrook Junior School site. The former Eastbrook Infants building is now occupied by Haywood Grove School, a special school for primary aged pupils with social, emotional and behavioural difficulties.

=== West ===
Name	Faith	Type	Gov	Opened	Intake	DCSF number	Ofsted number	Web	Coordinates
Boxmoor	–	Primary	CY	1842	30	2041	117107	W	51.7493°N 0.4885°W
Oakleaf	–	Infants	CY		50	2193	117202	W	51.7511°N 0.4998°W
Oakleaf	–	Junior	CY		60	2185	117198	W	51.7506°N 0.5003°W
Gade Valley	–	JMI	CY	1962	30	2274	117249	W	51.7584°N 0.4816°W
Galley Hill	–	Primary	CY	2008	45	3990	135224	W	51.7638°N 0.4900°W
Heath Lane	–	Nursery	CY	1942	80	1009	117070	W	51.7506°N 0.4780°W
Micklem	–	Primary	CY		30	2243	117231	W	51.7574°N 0.4934°W
Pixies Hill	–	Primary (ex JMI)	CY	1964	30	2293	117256	W	51.7486°N 0.5010°W
St Cuthbert Mayne	RC	Junior	VA	1958	60	3386	117468	W	51.7595°N 0.4825°W
St Rose's	RC	Infants	VA	1967	60	3409	117484	W	51.7473°N 0.4928°W
South Hill	–	Primary	CY	1951	60	2047	117110	W	51.7496°N 0.4772°W

The original school in Boxmoor was St John's national school, split between sites on Cowper Road and St John's Road. The school later passed to board control, and became Boxmoor Primary School. It moved into new buildings in 1974.

Gade Valley JMI and Nursery School came into existence in 1982 when the previously separate Infant Junior schools merged. The school is sited on the boundary of the Gadebridge and Hammerfield districts in the north of the town.

In a re-organisation in 2008, Galley Hill Primary School was formed from the amalgamation of Martindale and Rossgate Primary Schools on the Rossgate site.

In 1964 Pixies Hill Primary School opened as Pixies Hill JMI School.

== Berkhamsted ==
In Berkhamsted there operates a two-tier school system, comprising 2 infant schools, 1 junior school, 6 primary schools and a secondary school (Ashlyns School).

Name	Faith	Type	Gov	Opened	Intake	DCSF number	Ofsted number	Web	Coordinates
Bridgewater	–	Primary	CY	1972	95	4144	117541	W	51.7708°N 0.5751°W
Greenway	–	Infant	CY	1966	60	2326	117276	W	51.7582°N 0.5813°W
Potten End	CE	Primary	VC	1856	30	3042	117414	W	51.7703°N 0.5266°W
Northchurch St Mary's	CE	Primary	VA	1864	30	3315	117424	W	51.7702°N 0.5895°W
St Thomas More	RC	Primary	VA	1966	30	3402	117479	W	51.7590°N 0.5804°W
Swing Gate	–	Infant	CY	1968	30	2301	117260	W	51.7571°N 0.5551°W
Thomas Coram	CE	Junior	VA	1970	95	4627	117559	W	51.7514°N 0.5575°W
Victoria	CE	Primary	VA	1897	42	3314	117423	W	51.7592°N 0.5646°W
Westfield	–	Primary	CY	1962	30	2288	117254	W	51.7664°N 0.5851°W

A British school was established on the corner of Park View Road in 1834, becoming a board school in 1870 and renamed Park View School in 1948. It closed in 1971.

A national school was built in 1838 behind the courthouse, expanding to Gossoms End in 1844. The boys and girls schools moved to the new Victoria schools in 1898 and 1903 respectively. In 1945 these schools were reorganised as a mixed junior schoor and a secondary modern school (closed in 1951).

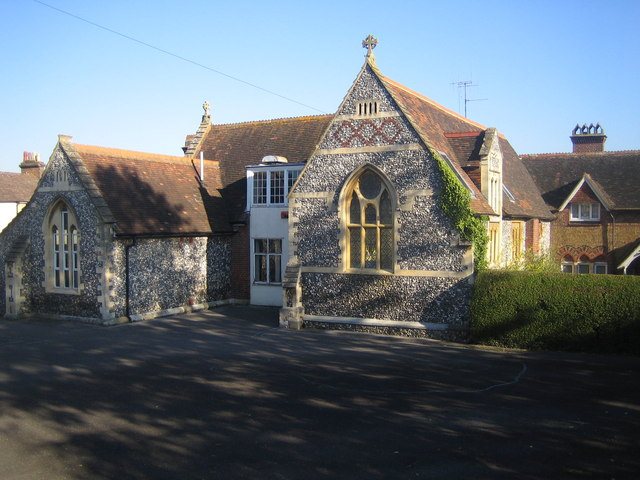
St Mary's VA C of E First School, Northchurch

St Mary's VA C of E First School was founded in 1864 as a national school in the Northchurch part of Berkhamsted. The original building with its Victorian stained glass window remains in use for communal purposes with modern classrooms added in the 1960s. The school field borders the Grand Union Canal and encloses a section of the River Bulbourne.

In 1970 the town adopted the three-tier system, converting the existing primary schools to first schools and building three new middle schools. Two of these, Augustus Smith Middle School and Thomas Bourne Middle School, amalgamated in 1988 on the Augustus Smith site as Thomas Coram Middle School. The former Thomas Bourne building was purchased by Egerton Rothesay School. In 2014 the town reverted to a two tier system in line with the rest of Dacorum and Hertfordshire.

St Thomas More RC Primary School, situated in the Shootersway district adjacent to Greenway First and Nursery School, serves the parishes of Berkhamsted and Tring. It has just over 200 pupils and covers the full primary school age range.

== Tring ==
Name	Faith	Type	Gov	Opened	Intake	DCSF number	Ofsted number	Web	Coordinates
Bishop Wood	CE	Junior	VA	1842	60	3371	117458	W	51.7942°N 0.6641°W
Dundale	–	Primary	CY	1968	30	2343	117286	W	51.7998°N 0.6618°W
Goldfield	–	Infants	CY		60	2322	117274	W	51.7941°N 0.6687°W
Grove Road	–	Primary	CY	1973	60	2436	117341	W	51.8025°N 0.6518°W

Tring National School originally stood on Aylesbury Road in the middle of Tring, on the current site of Tring Library. In the 1930s the junior and secondary departments were re-organised as separate schools, though still occupying the same building. The senior school moved to the top of Mortimer Hill in 1956 as Tring School, while the junior school became Bishop Wood C of E Junior School.

== Villages ==
Name	Faith	Type	Gov	Opened	Intake	DCSF number	Ofsted number	Web	Coordinates
Aldbury	CE	Primary	VC	1856	10	3000	117382	W	51.8029°N 0.6035°W
Bovingdon	–	Primary	CY	1927	60	2003	131188	W	51.7231°N 0.5317°W
Flamstead	–	Primary	CY	1867	15	2031	117100	W	51.8168°N 0.4362°W
Gaddesden Row	–	JMI	CY	1876	8	2032	117101	W	51.8058°N 0.4783°W
Great Gaddesden	CE	Primary	VA	1855	13	3335	117433	W	51.7905°N 0.5088°W
Kings Langley	–	Primary	CY	1838	60	2338	117283	W	51.7174°N 0.4564°W
Little Gaddesden	CE	Primary	VA	1854	15	3352	117443	W	51.8114°N 0.5605°W
Long Marston	CE	Primary	VA	1951	20	3373	117459	W	51.8323°N 0.6994°W
Markyate	–	Primary	CY		30	2074	117127	W	51.8377°N 0.4672°W
St Bartholomew's, Wigginton	CE	Primary	VA	1854	15	3380	117463	W	51.7823°N 0.6435°W
St Paul's, Chipperfield	CE	Primary	VA	c. 1840	30	3349	117441	W	51.7037°N 0.4930°W

Gaddesden Row JMI School was established in 1876 to meet obligations imposed on the community by the Education Act 1876. Hertfordshire County Council acquired the property in 1957 and improved it, creating a modern two-room school in unspoilt farmland. The only surviving part of the original school is now offices for the Headteacher and Secretary. In 2001 a new kitchen replaced the old one and a third classroom was added.

Little Gaddesden CE Voluntary Aided Primary School was initially held in a large room at the Bridgewater Arms, moving to a new building in 1858.

The original Kings Langley School was built by John Dickinson in School Lane. The building is now The Cloisters. It was replaced by Kings Langley Primary School and Kings Langley School, the local secondary school, in 1987.

Long Marston Voluntary Aided C of E Primary School was rebuilt in 1951 after the original building was destroyed by a bomb in World War II.

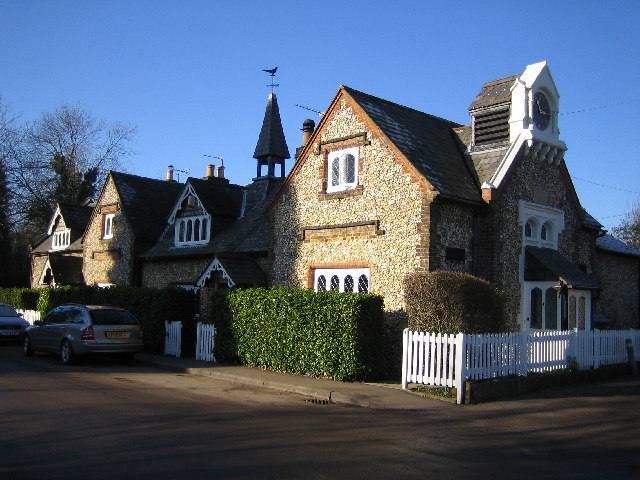
Old School Cottages, Chipperfield

St Bartholomew's C of E VA Primary School, located in Wigginton, was founded in 1854 by the local vicar, the Reverend Gaisford, to provide children within the parish with full-time education. It was originally a plaiting school where children made straw plaits for the Luton hat industry. The present school building was dedicated on 15 March 1969 by the Bishop of St Albans, Michael Gresford Jones.

St Paul's VA C of E Primary School is centrally sited in Chipperfield, close to the church and village green. In 1973 the school moved from flint cottages opposite the church to a new building with an unusual circular plan.

== Independent schools ==
A number of independent schools in the area also take children of primary age.

Abbot's Hill School is an independent school that caters for girls up to GCSE age. There are around 480 pupils. The School was founded in 1912, and is situated in John Dickinson's house in 76 acres (31 ha) of parkland on the southern edge of Hemel Hempstead.

Lockers Park School, situated between Hammerfield and the centre of Hemel Hempstead, is a day and boarding school accommodating boys up to age 13. It was founded in 1874 by Henry Montagu Draper to prepare boys for Rugby School, and is thus one of the earliest purpose-built preparatory schools in England.

The Arts Educational School is an independent day and boarding school with about 275 pupils at Tring Park. The school includes a preparatory department taking pupils from age 8. The school provides vocational training in dance, drama and musical theatre as well as a secondary level academic curriculum.

The Rudolf Steiner School Kings Langley is an independent school that caters for children up to age 19, including those of primary school age. It was opened in 1949 and is one of the oldest Rudolf Steiner Schools in the UK.
