= Kings Langley railway station =

Railway station in Hertfordshire, England

Coordinates: 51.706°N 0.438°W

Kings Langley
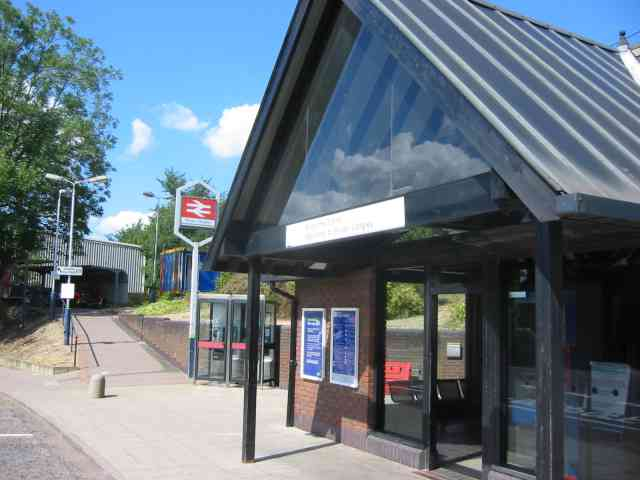

General information
- Location: Abbots Langley, District of Three Rivers; England
- Grid reference: TL080019
- Manager: London Northwestern Railway
- Platforms: 4

Other information
- Station code: KGL
- Classification: DfT category E

History
- Opened: 1839

Passengers
- 2021/22: ▲0.282 million
- 2022/23: ▲0.382 million
- 2023/24: ▲0.449 million
- 2024/25: ▲0.507 million
- 2025/26: ▲0.601 million
Location
Notes
- Passenger statistics from the Office of Rail and Road

Kings Langley railway station serves the villages of Kings Langley, Abbots Langley and Hunton Bridge, in Hertfordshire, England. It is a stop on the West Coast Main Line, 21 miles (34 km) north-west of London Euston. It lies almost under the M25 motorway, near to junction 20. The station and all services calling here are operated by London Northwestern Railway.

== History ==
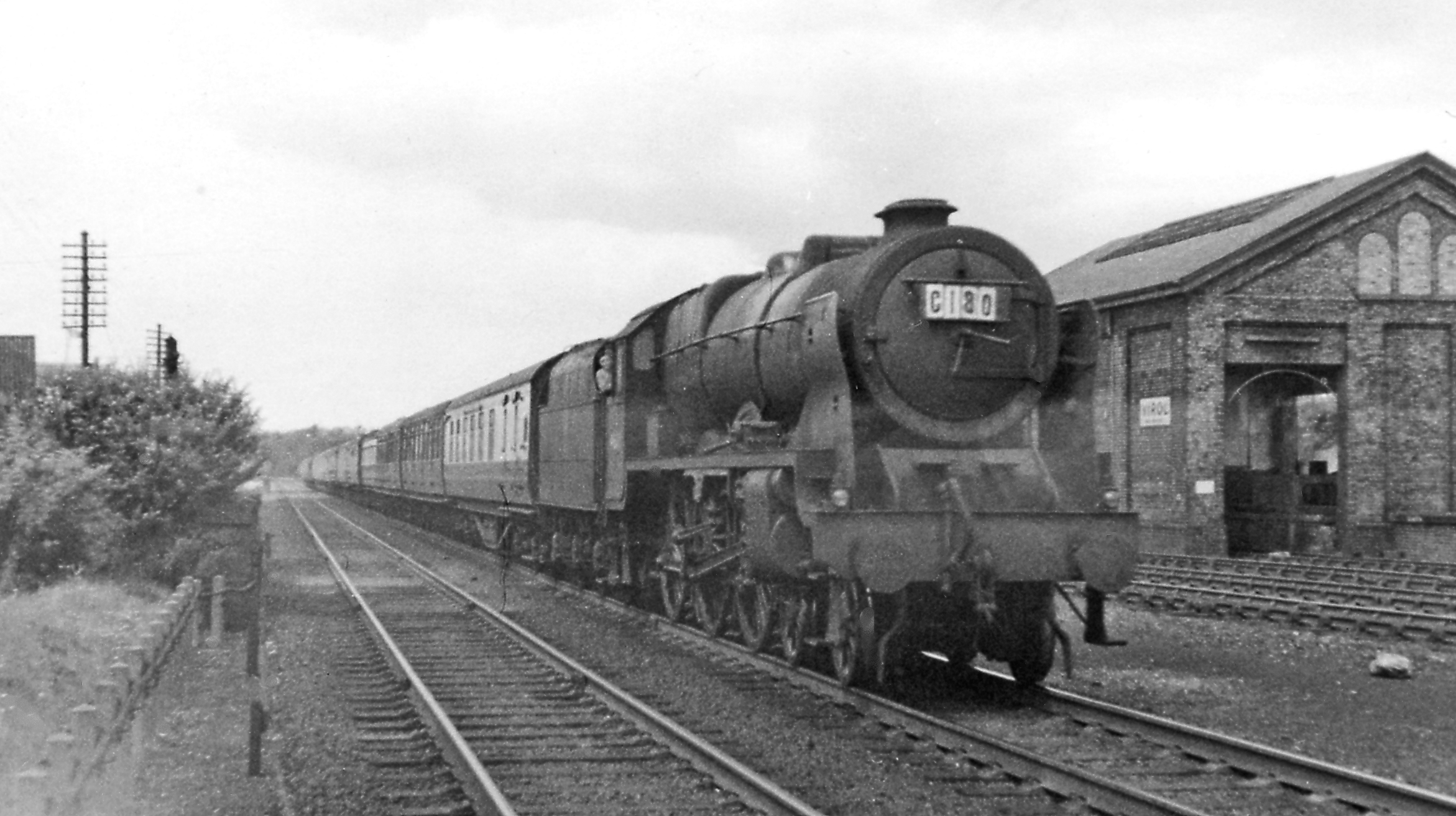
Blackpool - London express at Kings Langley in 1953

In July 1837, the London and Birmingham Railway (L&BR) opened the first part of its new railway line between London Euston and Boxmoor (now Hemel Hempstead). The line was fully opened between Euston and Birmingham Curzon Street in September 1838. Kings Langley had no station of its own, the nearest being at Boxmoor or Watford.

Local industrialist John Dickinson used his influence to convince the L&BR to open a station at Kings Langley; in 1839, the station was opened.

From 1909, the station was known as Kings Langley & Abbots Langley, becoming Kings Langley on 6 May 1974.

=== Accidents and incidents ===
- On 5 January 1847, a collision occurred between two trains of the London North Western Railway due to fog. Two people died.
- On 1 October 1854, the late-running 17:40 Rugby to London coal train operated by LNWR arrived at King's Langley to drop off a wagon for the station. As the train departed, a coupling failed, separating thirteen wagons from the train. Due to repairs on the coupling, none of the guards were guarding the line for oncoming trains. Shortly thereafter, the 21:15 goods train also from Rugby to London collided with the coal train's stranded portion just north of the station. The fireman of the goods train tried to jump off of his train before the collision, but his leg was crushed and it was amputated.
- On 13 March 1935, an express meat train from Liverpool to London was brought to a halt at Kings Langley due to a defective vacuum brake. Due to a signalman's error, a milk train ran into its rear. Wreckage spread across all four lines, with the result that a few minutes later the Camden to Holyhead freight collided with the debris. This was followed a few seconds later by the Toton to Willesden coal train. Contemporaneous newsreel footage shows the aftermath of the four-fold accident. All four lines were blocked for some time. William Buckley, the milk train's driver, was killed and the guard of the meat train and fireman of the goods train were injured. The signalman of King's Langley block had accepted the meat train from the previous block at Nash Mills at 23:03, but did not receive the train. He had a phone call with the Nash Mills signalman at 23:05 to ask about the train, in which he believed that the train Nash Mills wanted him to take was a passenger train that passed earlier. He cleared his signals for the milk train, not realising that the meat train had entered his section and broken down due to a vacuum brake failure; it was only just proceeding when the milk train collided.
- On 21 April 1963, the 12:20 Holyhead to Euston express running on the up fast line collided with a rail-mounted crane whose boom was projected over the up fast line north of the station. The express struck the crane at a glancing blow, derailing the Class 40 diesel locomotive hauling the train and four carriages. The accident was caused by the failure of the workman supervising the crane work, as he had arranged to guard the crane's work despite not being able to communicate with the signalmen who would stop the trains. A restaurant staff member aboard the express was slightly injured.

== Services ==
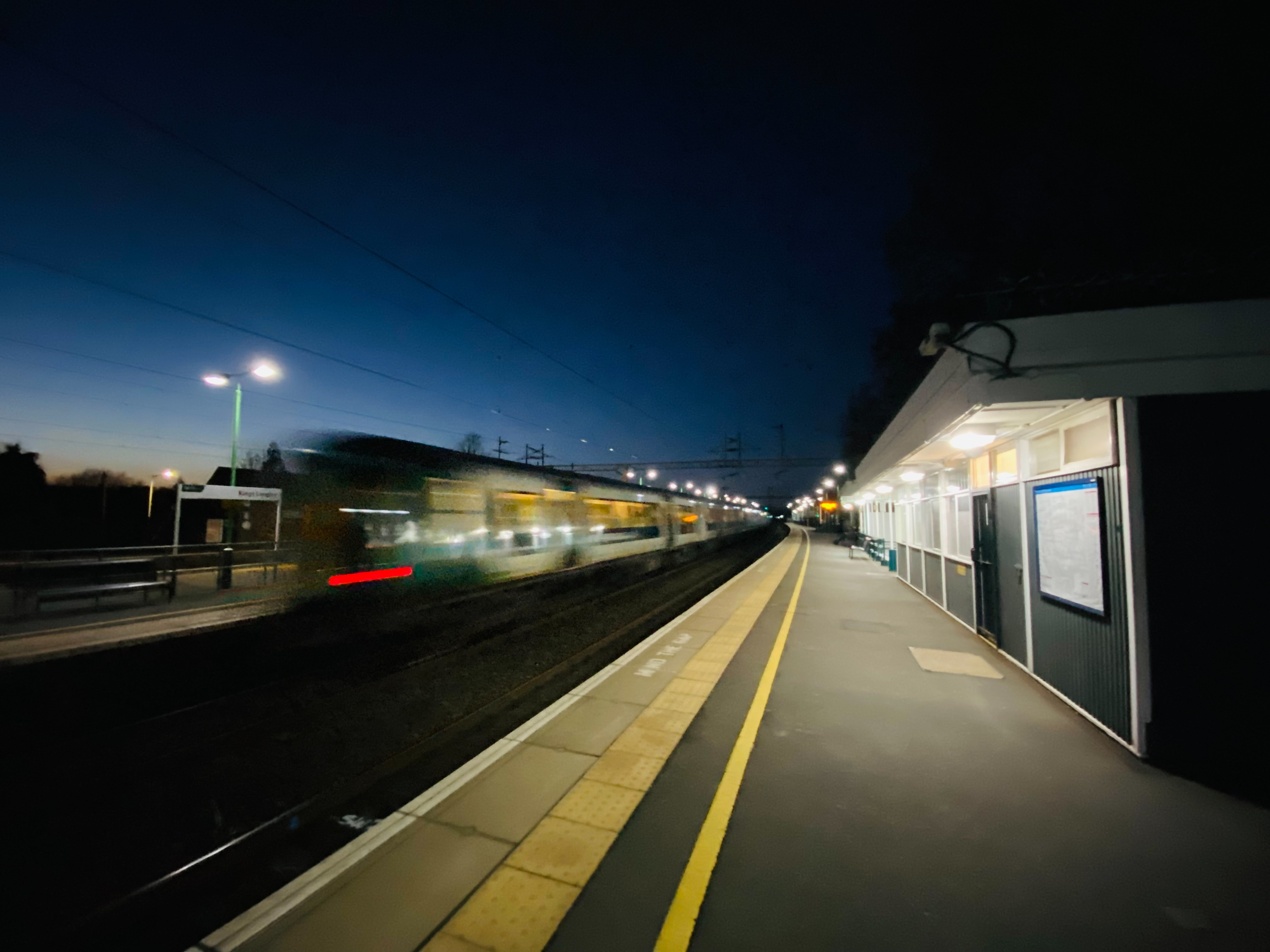
A train passing through the station in 2022

All services at Kings Langley are operated by London Northwestern Railway.

The typical off-peak service in trains per hour is:

- 2 tph to London Euston
- 2 tph to Milton Keynes Central

During peak hours, a number of additional services between London Euston, Tring and Bletchley call at the station.

A number of early morning and late evening services are extended beyond Milton Keynes Central to and from Northampton and Birmingham New Street.

Preceding station	National Rail	Following station
Apsley towards Milton Keynes Central	London Northwestern Railway London–Milton Keynes	Watford Junction towards London Euston
	Historical railways	
Boxmoor (Note: Now called Hemel Hempstead.) Line and station open	London and Birmingham Railway	Watford (Note: The original Watford station was replaced by Watford Junction in 1858) Old station
