= Apsley railway station =

Railway station in Hertfordshire, England

Coordinates: 51.733°N 0.463°W

Apsley
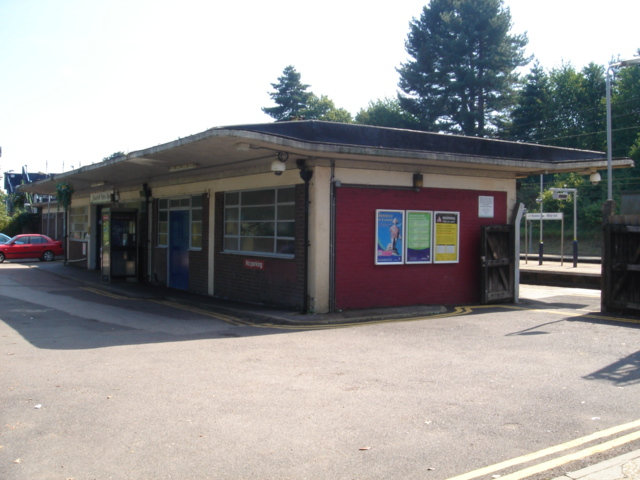

General information
- Location: Apsley, Borough of Dacorum; England
- Grid reference: TL062048
- Manager: London Northwestern Railway
- Platforms: 4

Other information
- Station code: APS
- Classification: DfT category E

History
- Opened: 26 September 1938

Passengers
- 2021/22: ▲0.327 million
- 2022/23: ▲0.406 million
- 2023/24: ▲0.473 million
- 2024/25: ▲0.518 million
- 2025/26: ▲0.579 million
Location
Notes
- Passenger statistics from the Office of Rail and Road

Apsley railway station serves the village of Apsley, on the southern outskirts of Hemel Hempstead, in Hertfordshire, England. It is of two railway stations now serving the town; the other is Hemel Hempstead, just down the line in Boxmoor. The station lies 23 miles (37 km) north-west of London Euston on the West Coast Main Line. Apsley is managed by London Northwestern Railway, which also operates all services that stop here.

== History ==
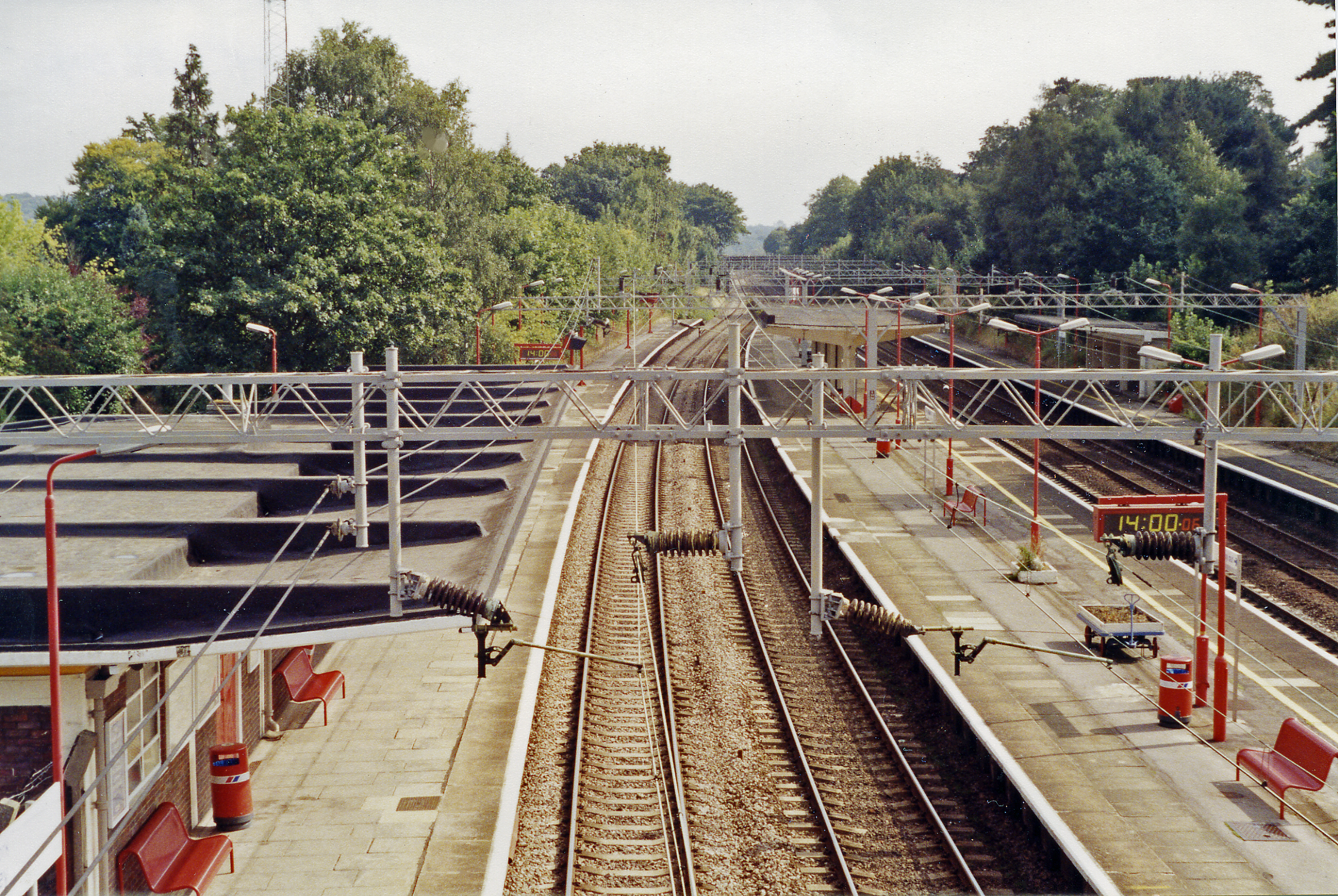
Platform view (1991)

The station was designed by the architect William Henry Hamlyn and opened on 26 September 1938, to serve the paper producing area of Apsley Mill and Nash Mill. It was operated initially by the London, Midland and Scottish Railway. The station then passed on to the London Midland Region of British Railways on nationalisation in 1948.

When sectorisation was introduced in the 1980s, the station was served by Network SouthEast until the privatisation of British Rail.

== Services ==
All services at Apsley are operated by London Northwestern Railway.

The typical off-peak service in trains per hour is:

- 2 tph to London Euston
- 2 tph to Milton Keynes Central

During peak hours, a number of additional services between London Euston, Tring and Bletchley call at the station. A number of early morning and late evening services are extended beyond Milton Keynes Central to and from Northampton and Birmingham New Street.

| Preceding station | National Rail | Following station |
|---|---|---|
| Hemel Hempstead towards Milton Keynes Central | London Northwestern Railway London–Milton Keynes | Kings Langley towards London Euston |
