= Croxley Danes School =

Location
- Baldwins Lane, Croxley Green; Rickmansworth, Hertfordshire, WD3 3LR; England; 51.652572°N 0.432066°W

Information
- Type: Free School
- Motto: Loyauté M'Oblige (Loyalty has its Obligations)
- Established: 1 September 2017
- Local authority: Hertfordshire
- Department for Education URN: 144402 Tables
- Ofsted: Reports
- Head teacher: Andy Harris
- Gender: Mixed
- Age: 11 to 18
- Enrolment: 477 pupils
- Houses: 6 houses
- Colours: Purple, Green
- Website: www.croxleydanes.org.uk

Croxley Danes School is a co-educational Secondary School and sixth form currently located in Rickmansworth, Hertfordshire.

== Admissions ==
Croxley Danes is an all-ability academy school, with the majority of students admitted based on the proximity of their home to the school. Priority is given to children of staff and siblings of current students, however, up to 10% of students are admitted based upon their performance in a musical aptitude test.

== Location ==
The permanent school site is located on Baldwins Lane, Croxley Green, with an area of 33 acres. It is approximately half a mile (0.8 km) from Croxley tube station.

== History ==
The school was given approval for opening in February 2017 by the Department for Education, and opened in September 2017 in temporary accommodation on the site of St Clement Danes School. The old maths block of the school was refurbished to provide separate facilities for the Croxley Danes students, with 120 new year 7 pupils admitted in the first year.

In September 2018, a further 180 students were admitted and the school moved to temporary accommodation in Tolpits Lane, occupying the former site of the Reach Free School, whilst the permanent site was being completed. This move was carried out instead of building temporary buildings on the permanent site to accommodate the students.

The transfer of the school to the permanent site on Baldwins Lane was planned to take place at the end of the Easter term in 2020, but delays meant that the transfer instead occurred over the school summer holidays, with pupils first attending the new site in September 2020.

== Houses ==
The names of each of the school houses are related to the history of the school site or to the local Croxley Green area. Cassiobridge and Snells are named after former houses located on the site, whilst Jaggerts and Mallets are former names of fields. The land was previously owned by Gonville and Caius College, Cambridge, giving the name for Gonville house, whilst Dickinson house is named after John Dickinson, who built a paper mill in Croxley between 1828 and 1830.

=== Current Houses and Colours ===
House	House Colour
Cassiobridge	Blue
Dickinson	Red
Gonville	Yellow/Gold
Jaggerts	White/Silver
Mallets	Green
Snells	Orange
