= Boschstraatkwartier =

Coordinates: 50°51′18.57″N 5°41′32.25″E

- neighbourhood
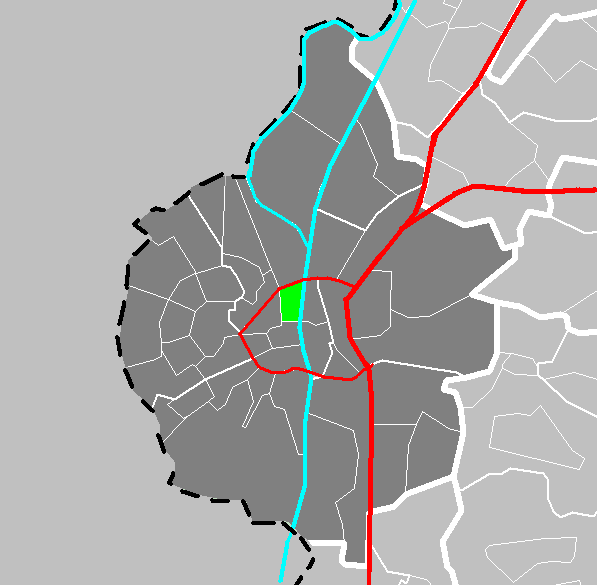
- Location of Boschstraatkwartier in Maastricht
- Municipality: Maastricht
- Province: Limburg
- Country: Netherlands

Area
  - Total: 38 ha (94 acres)

Population
  - Total: 1.611
  - Density: 4.2/km^{2} (11/sq mi)

The Boschstraatkwartier (Dutch: [ˈbɔstraːtkʋɑrˌtiːr]; Limburgish: Boschstraotkerteer [ˈbɔstʀɒːtkəʀˌteːʀ]) is a neighbourhood in the old city centre of Maastricht, Limburg, Netherlands.

== History ==
The neighbourhood got its name after the old Boschpoort (English: Den Bosch Gate), one of the seven former city gates of Maastricht. The Boschpoort gate and the outlying defense works were demolished in the 1860s when Maastricht ceased to be a fortress town.

== Impressions ==
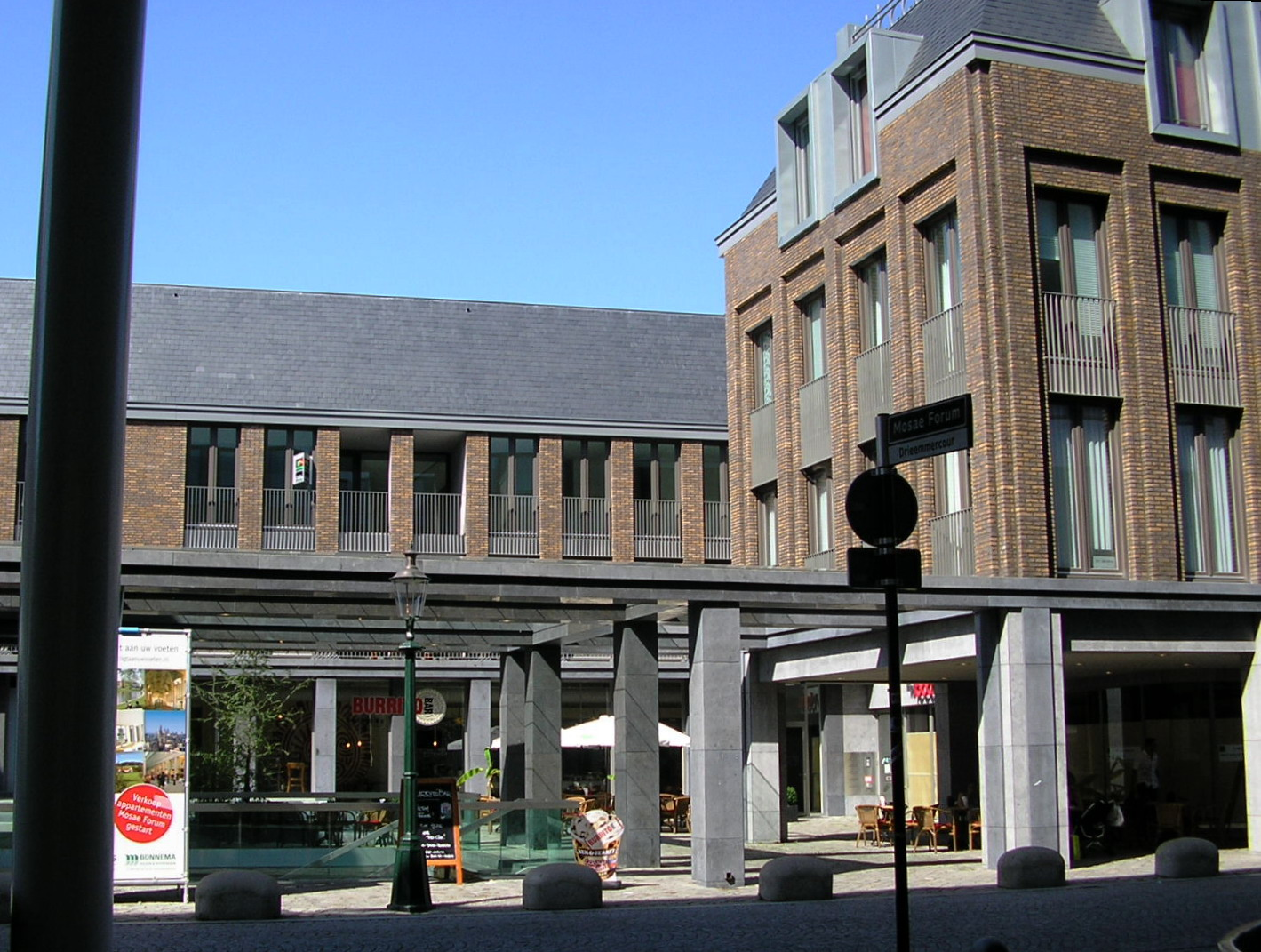
Gubbelstraat with newly built Mosae Forum

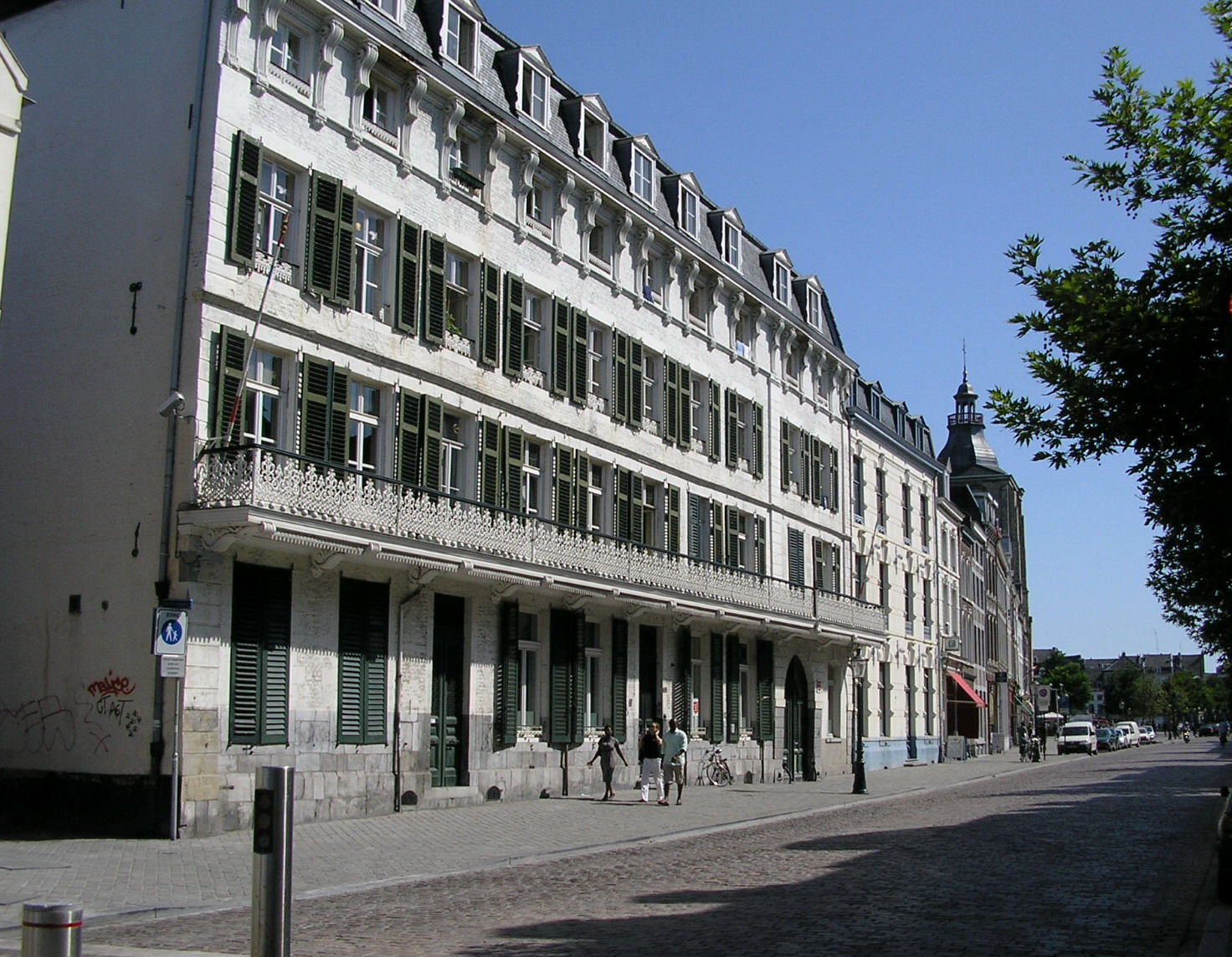
Boschstraat with Refugie van Hocht

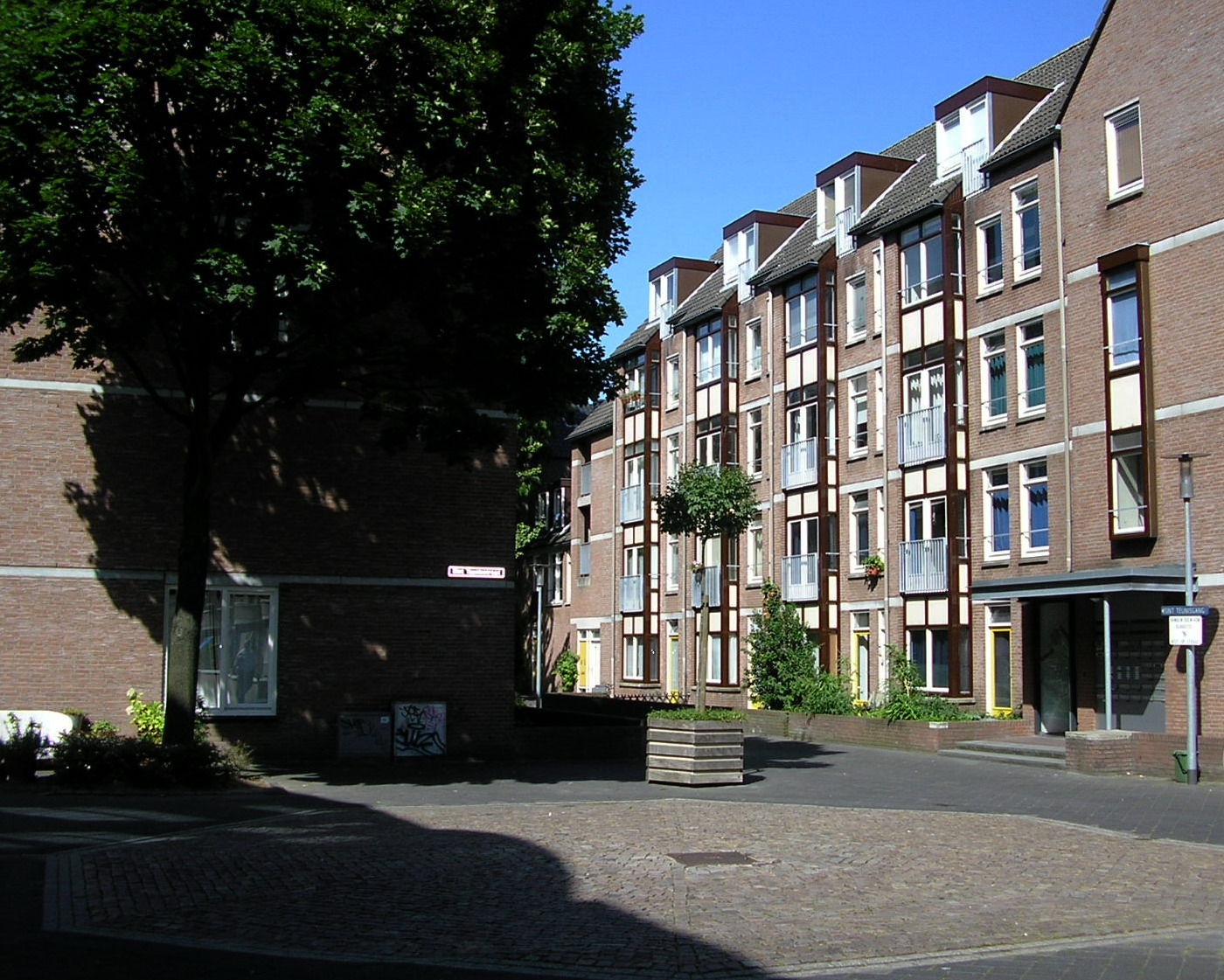
Boschstraat East

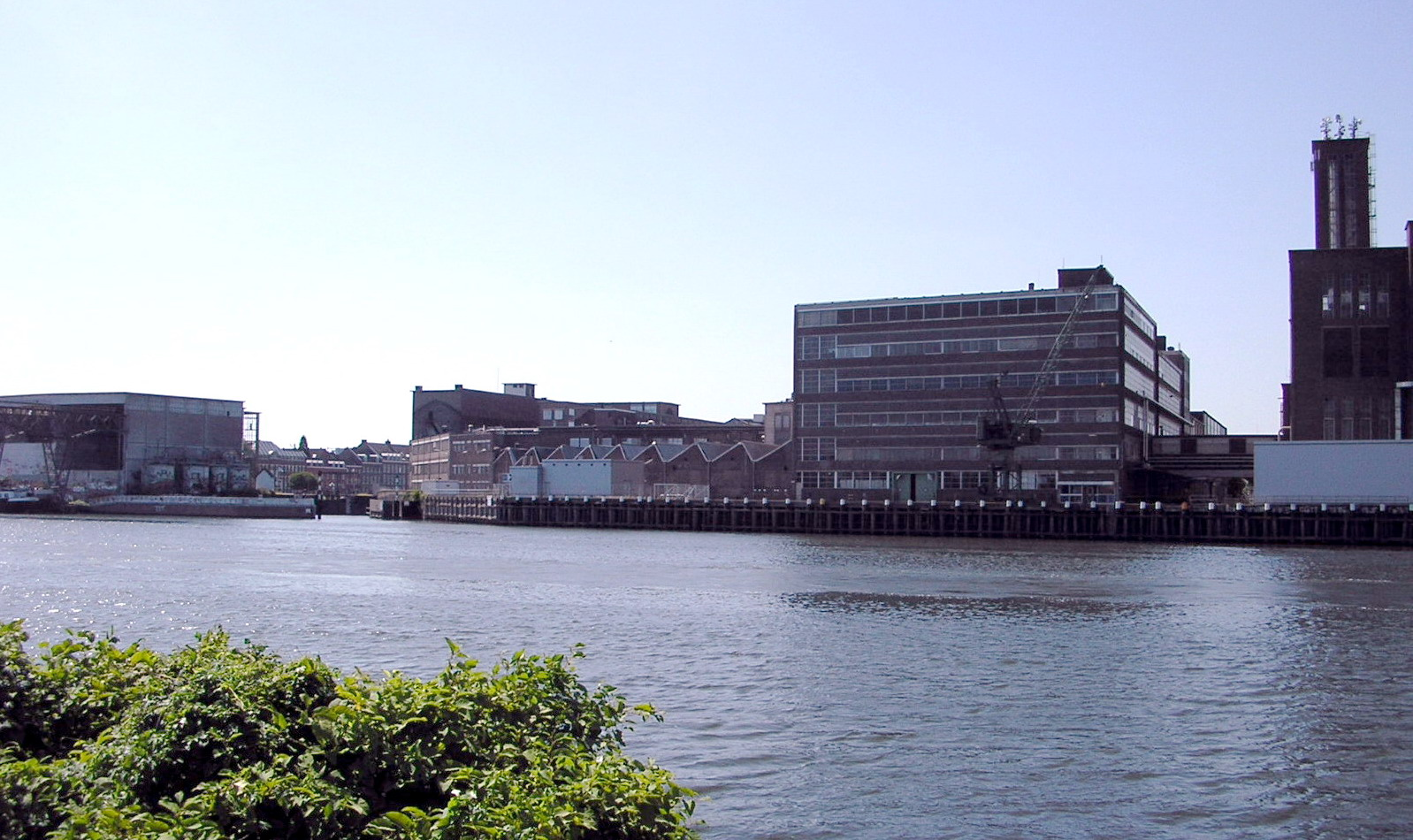
Sappi paper mill seen from the opposite side of the river
