= Croxley Green =

Suburb and civil parish in Hertfordshire, England

Coordinates: 51.647°N 0.445°W

- Location within Hertfordshire
- Population: 12,562 (2011 Census)
- OS grid reference: TQ075955
- Civil parish: Croxley Green
- District: Three Rivers
- Shire county: Hertfordshire
- Region: East
- Country: England
- Sovereign state: United Kingdom
- Post town: RICKMANSWORTH
- Postcode district: WD3
- Dialling code: 01923
- Police: Hertfordshire
- Fire: Hertfordshire
- Ambulance: East of England
- UK Parliament: South West Hertfordshire

Croxley Green is both a village and a suburb of Rickmansworth in Hertfordshire, England. It is also a civil parish. Located on the A412 between Watford to the northeast and Rickmansworth to the southwest, it is approximately 20 miles (32 km) northwest of central London. It purportedly has the longest village green in England with a length of 1,207.5 metres.

Croxley Green has changed considerably in the years since John Dickinson built paper mills in the area. The area has grown into a semi-urban community, thanks to Croxley tube station on the Metropolitan line providing connections to London's West End at Baker Street and stations through to the City at Aldgate.

The population at the 2011 Census was 12,562. Croxley Green is a part of the UK Parliament constituency, South West Hertfordshire. Gagan Mohindra is the Member of Parliament since the December 2019 United Kingdom general election.

== History ==
Croxley Green has a large village green.

In 1830, John Dickinson built Croxley Mill adjacent to the Grand Junction Canal, since 1929 part of the Grand Union Canal. John Dickinson Stationery produced Croxley Script. Dickinson Square and Dickinson Avenue are named after the paper mill owner and contain houses built by the company for their workers at the end of the 19th century. The mill closed in 1980.

Croxley Green was historically part of the parish of Rickmansworth, which was included in the Watford Poor Law Union from 1835. When sanitary districts were created in 1872, the parish of Rickmansworth, including Croxley Green, therefore became part of the Watford Rural Sanitary District, which in turn became Watford Rural District in 1894.

Croxley Green became part of Rickmansworth Urban District on its creation on 15 April 1898. On 1 April 1974, the urban district was abolished and the village became part of the Three Rivers District. The civil parish of Croxley Green was created on 1 April 1986, covering the eastern part of the former Rickmansworth Urban District and an adjoining area transferred from the parish of Sarratt.

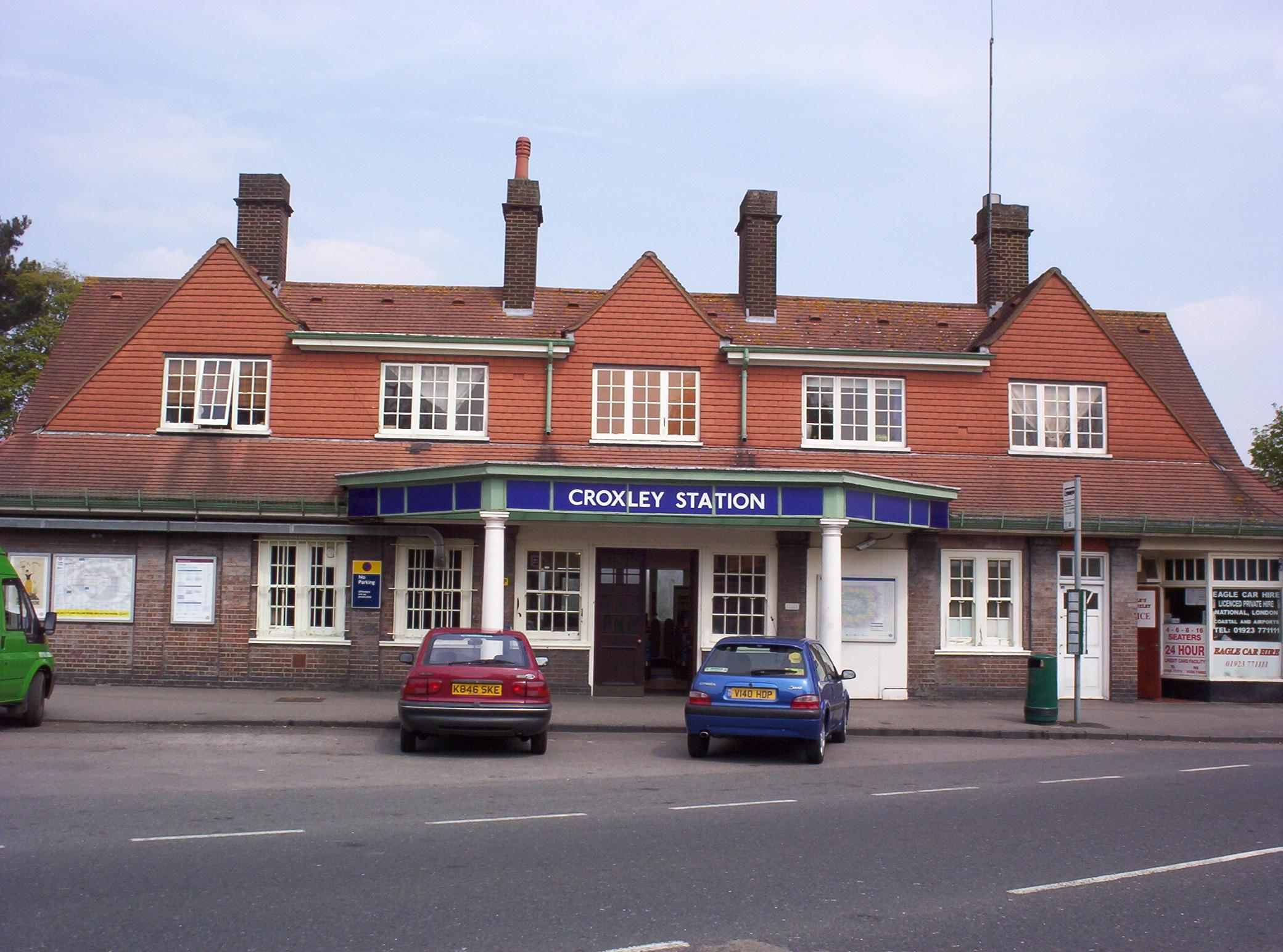
Croxley Underground Station

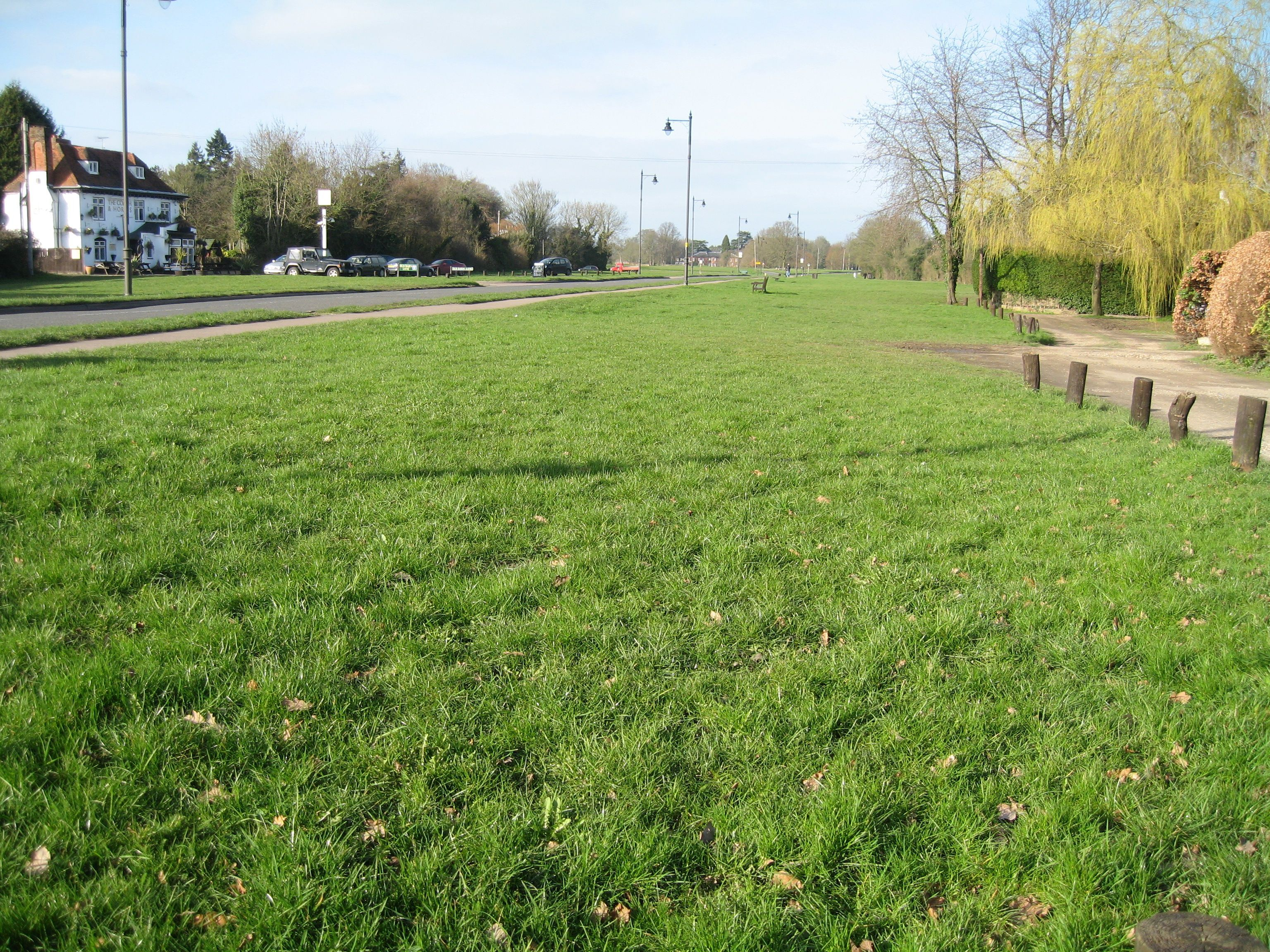
The Green

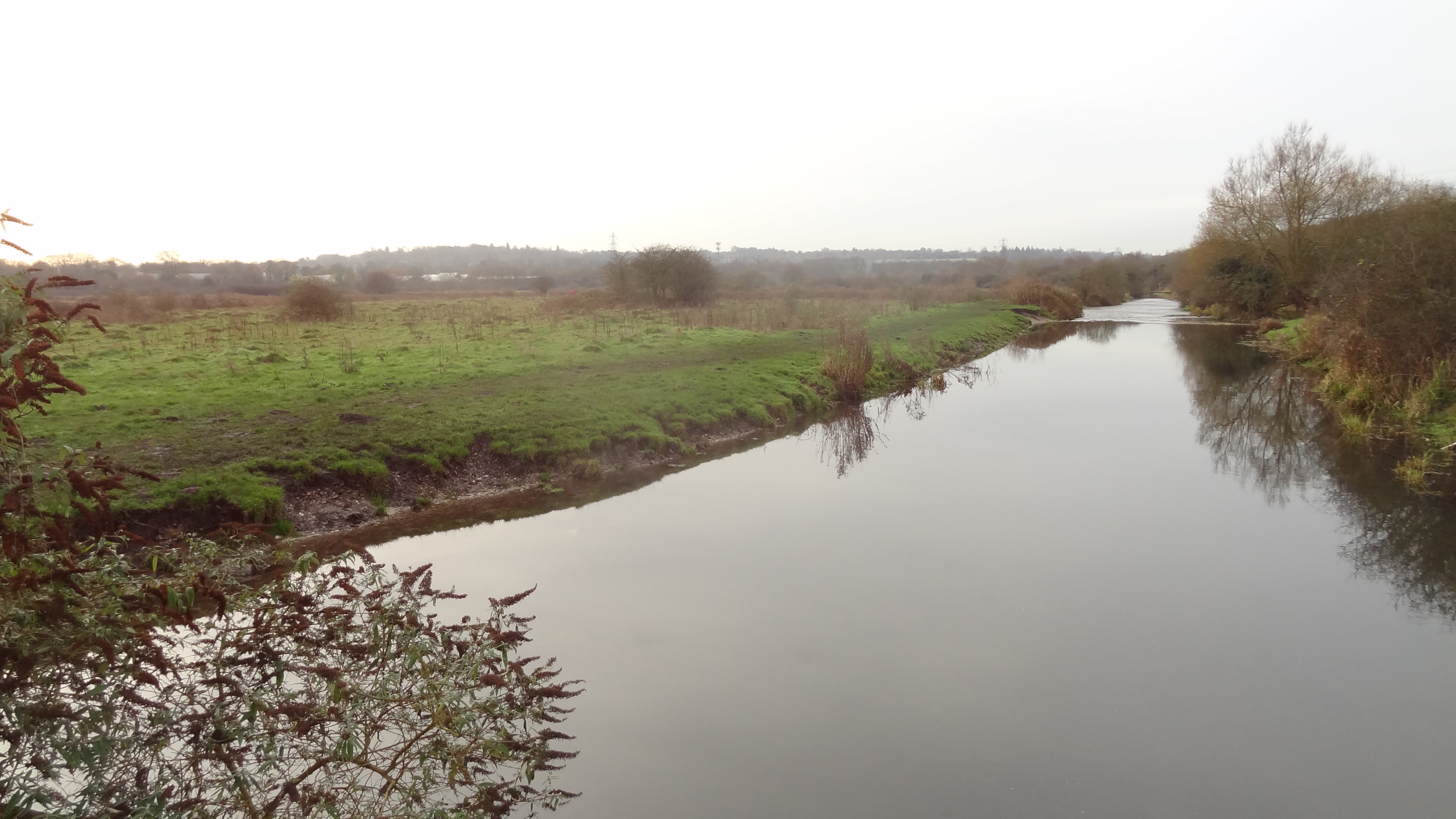
Croxley Common Moor River Gade

== Churches ==
- C of E All Saints' Church, The Green
- C of E St Oswald's Church, Malvern Way
- Christ First Watford, Fuller Way
- Croxley Green Baptist Church, Baldwin's Lane
- Croxley Green Methodist Church, New Road
- Roman Catholic, St Bede's, Baldwins Lane
- Croxley Green Christian Assembly

== Notable residents ==
- Barbara Woodhouse the dog trainer presented Training Dogs the Woodhouse Way on television in the 1980s and lived at Campions from the 1940s to the 1980s.
- Fred Housego, the 1980 BBC Mastermind winner, and sometime London black cab driver.
- Ron Tarr, a British actor, best known for playing the part of "Big Ron" in EastEnders, lived in Durrants Drive. In a report about Tarr's death in the Daily Mirror, journalist Chris Hughes stated the character had "a cult following".
- Dave Edwards/Mr Christmas, local resident whose extensive annual Christmas lights display, on his house in Lancing Way, raised money for charity and was featured in national news and on TV
- Christopher Gunning, composer of film and television music (such the Poirot theme and well-known advertisements for Black Magic and Martini), as well as 13 symphonies, died at his home in Croxley Green in March 2023.

== Schools ==
- Morris Minors Pre School
- Malvern Way Infant and Nursery School
- Little Green Junior School
- Harvey Road Primary School
- Yorke Mead Primary School
- Rickmansworth School
- Croxley Danes School, built between 2017 and 2020.

=== York House School ===
York House School is an independent preparatory day school for girls and boys aged from 3 to 13 years of age, located on Sarratt Road near Croxley Green in Redhead, an eighteenth-century mansion. The current features date variously from 1712, 1743 and 1866.

The school was founded in Hampstead in 1910 by Rev. Cambridge Victor Hawkins. It relocated to Rickmansworth in the late 1940s, then moved again to its current location in 1966. The school motto is "Aut Viam Inveniam Aut Faciam", which is Latin for "Either I shall find a way or I shall make one". The school's alumni are referred to as Old Yorkists.
