= Robert Gair =

Scottish 19th-century inventor

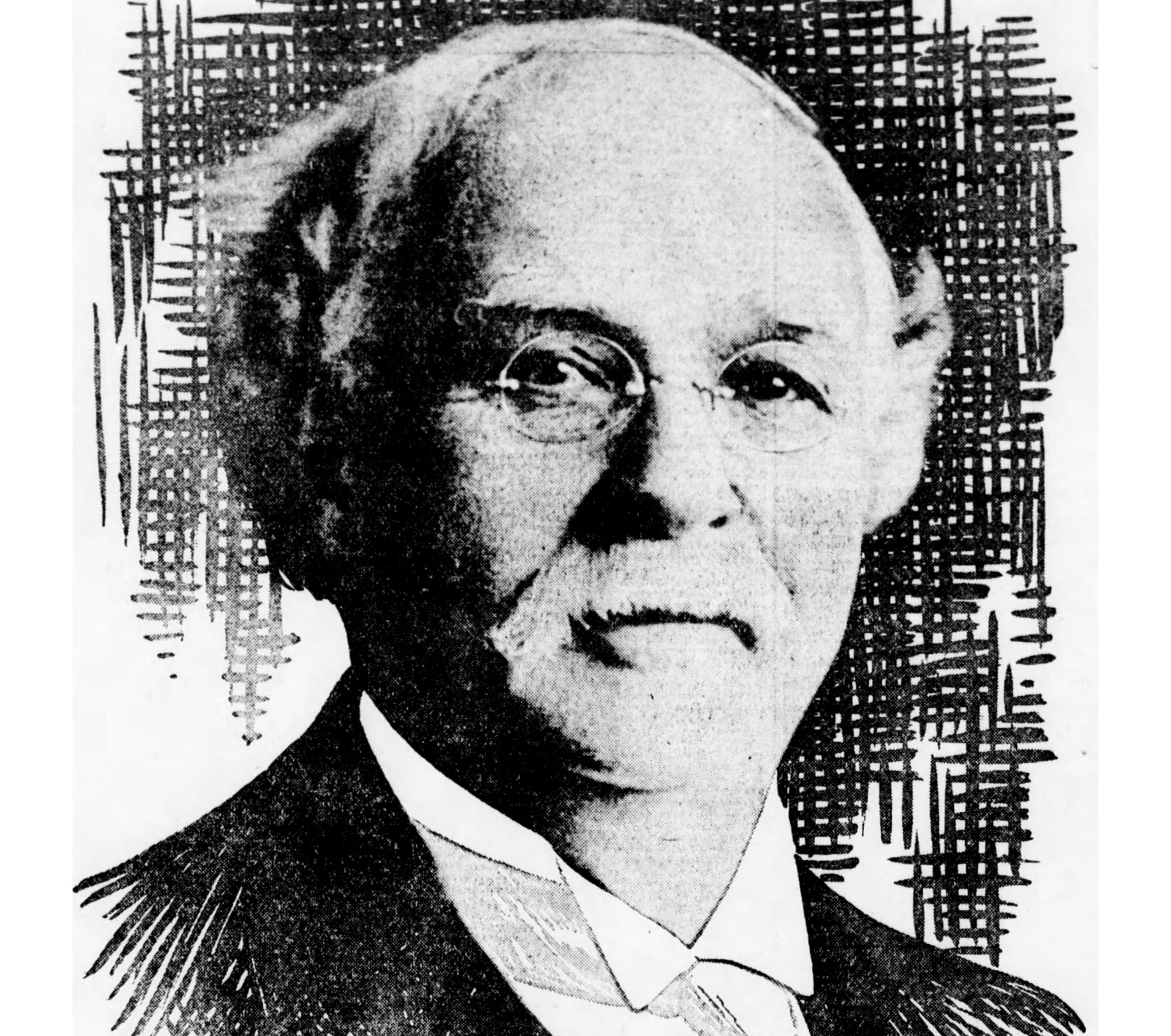
Photo of Robert Gair in the Brooklyn Eagle, 1914.

Robert Gair (July 31, 1839— August 1, 1927) was a Scottish-American printer and paper bag maker who invented the folding carton in 1879.

Born in Edinburgh, Scotland in 1839, he emigrated to the United States at age 14. Gair invented the paperboard folding carton by accident when a metal ruler used to crease bags shifted position and cut the bag. Gair found that by cutting and creasing paperboard in one operation, he could make prefabricated cartons. He ultimately entered the corrugated fiberboard shipping container business in the 1900s. His idea was developed and utilized by E. S. & A. Robinson with whom he had long-term business dealings.

Gair founded a paper empire and occupied several buildings in the area of Brooklyn now known as Dumbo, many of which still bear his name.
