= Dickinson Robinson Group =

The Dickinson Robinson Group, or DRG, was a listed British paper, printing and packaging company founded in 1966 as a result of a merger of John Dickinson Stationery Ltd. and E. S. & A. Robinson Ltd., creating one of the world's largest stationery and packaging companies. Products with a high public profile included Sellotape, which it owned from the 1960s to the 1980s, and Basildon Bond, which dated from 1911.

In 1978, DRG took over the Royal Sovereign group of companies.

In 1989, Roland Franklin (Pembridge Associates) acquired DRG's packaging business with a leveraged buyout worth £900 million and the assets of that company were stripped. In 1992, the packaging business was acquired by Bowater-Scott.

The John Dickinson stationery business was acquired by DS Smith in 1996 and, in turn, in 2005 by Hamelin, a French company.

== Paper cup production ==
DRG Cups manufactured and distributed disposable paper cups throughout the 1970s and early 1980s, but with the emergence of the plastic cup, which could be produced more economically and was of higher quality, the company began to decline. This led to the closure of its production plant in Liverpool in 1983, as it proved too costly for DRG Cups to maintain a competitive position. The company was eventually bought out by Polarcup (a subsidiary of Finland-based company Huhtamaki), which opened a new paper cup manufacturing plant in Devizes, Wiltshire, in 1984.
