= Tring School =

Location
- Mortimer Hill; Tring, Hertfordshire, HP23 5JD; England; 51.798119°N 0.654513°W

Information
- Type: Academy
- Motto: Live to Learn, Learn to Live
- Religious affiliation: Church of England
- Established: 1842; 184 years ago
- Founder: Rev. Edward I. Randolph
- Department for Education URN: 138352 Tables
- Ofsted: Reports
- Chair of Governors: A Kent
- CEO of RLP: N/A
- Head of School: S Ambrose
- Staff: 200+
- Gender: Mixed
- Age: 11 to 18
- Enrolment: 1,545
- Houses: Ascott; Claydon; Halton; Waddesdon
- Colour: Maroon Black
- Alumni: Old Tringians
- Website: www.tring.herts.sch.uk

Tring School is a secondary school with academy status, with approximately 1500 students aged between 11 and 18. It is located on Mortimer Hill on the east side of the town of Tring, Hertfordshire, England. Tring School includes a Sixth Form with over 300 students. The school was founded by the Church of England and is within the Diocesan Board of Education of the St Albans Diocese.

== History ==
In the early 19th century, the only education local children received was from the church-run school of St Peter and St Paul's, which taught around 240 pupils together in the Vestry Hall. However this was insufficient because the school only operated on Sundays and, in the opinion of the Brougham inspectors of 1811 at least, was severely unprovided for in comparison with Long Marston school, which contained only 92 students.

Tring National School was founded in 1842 by Church of England Revd Edward I. Randolph, with the assistance of a grant from the National Society, on land granted by the Dean and Chapter of Christ Church, Oxford. At that time it was built on Aylesbury Road in the middle of Tring, where Tring Library now stands.

During the First World War, the school building was taken over as a military hospital.

In the 1930s the junior and secondary departments were re-organised as separate schools, though still occupying the same building. The junior school would later become Bishop Wood C of E Junior School. In 1956 the senior school, now known as Tring School, moved to its present site at the top of Mortimer Hill, to the east of the town, and in 1969 it was re-organised as an all-ability 11–19 co-educational school.

The school converted to academy status in August 2012 and then became part of the Ridgeway Learning Partnership in December 2017.

== Academic standards ==
Following the Ofsted inspection in November 2017, Tring School was rated Good with an Outstanding sixth form, Outstanding personal development and Outstanding behaviour. It was inspected again in 2023 and the previous judgement of Good was reconfirmed; As of 2025, this is the most recent inspection. The school was also rated 'Good' under the SIAMS inspection framework in May 2019 with 'Outstanding' Religious Education.

== Alumni ==
- Lawrence Ward, former Serjeant at Arms of the British House of Commons was a pupil from 1979 until 1984.
