= John Dickinson Stationery =

Defunct British paper company (1809–2008)

Coordinates: 51.645°N 0.438°W

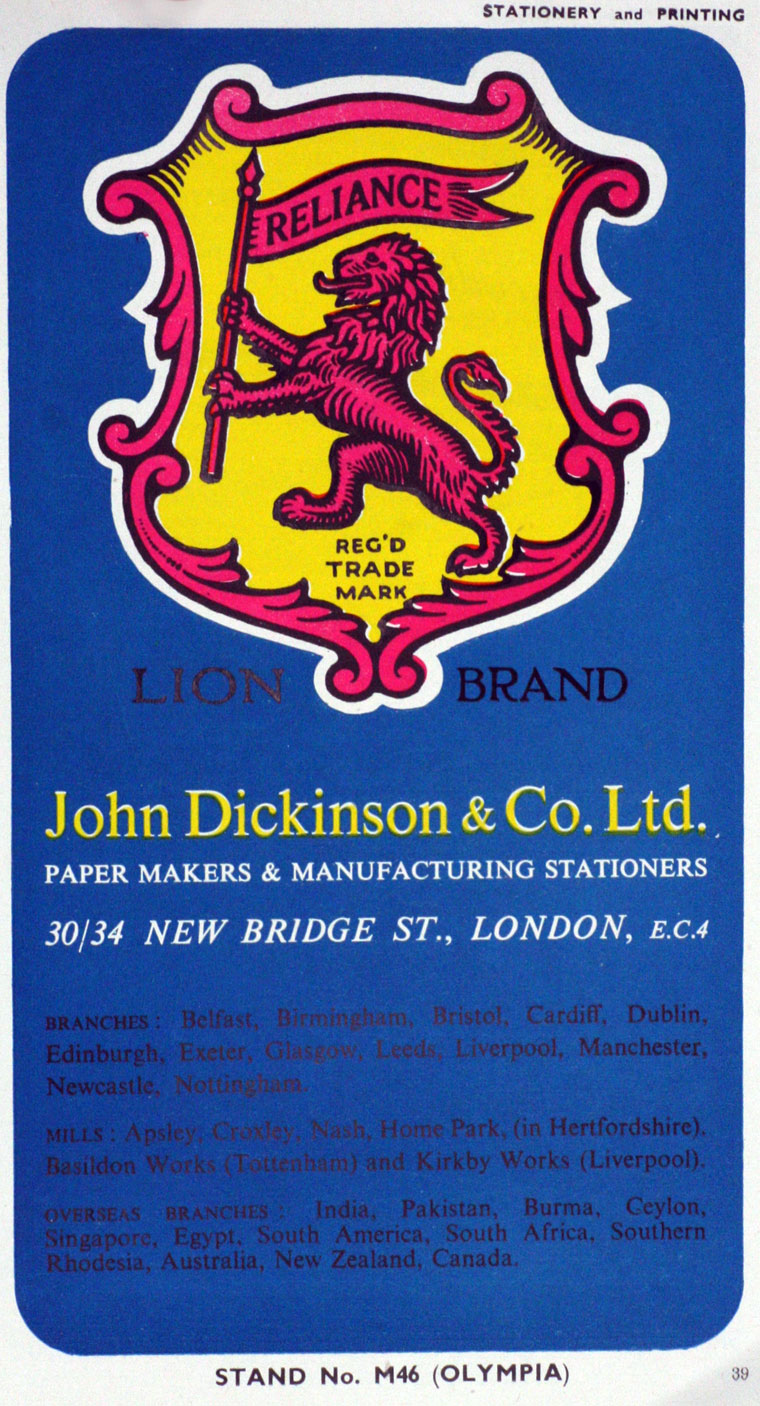
Advertisement from John Dickinson & Co. with the "Lion Brand" logo

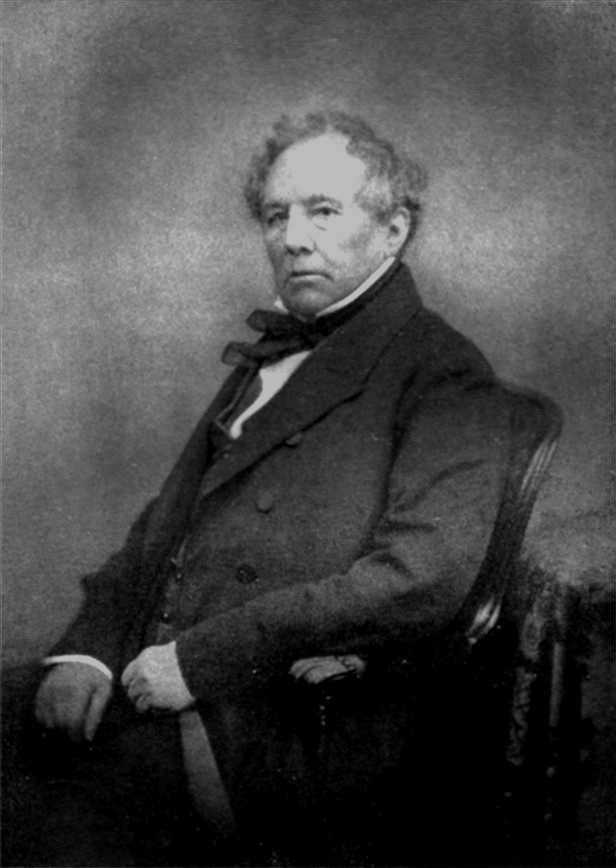
Founder John Dickinson

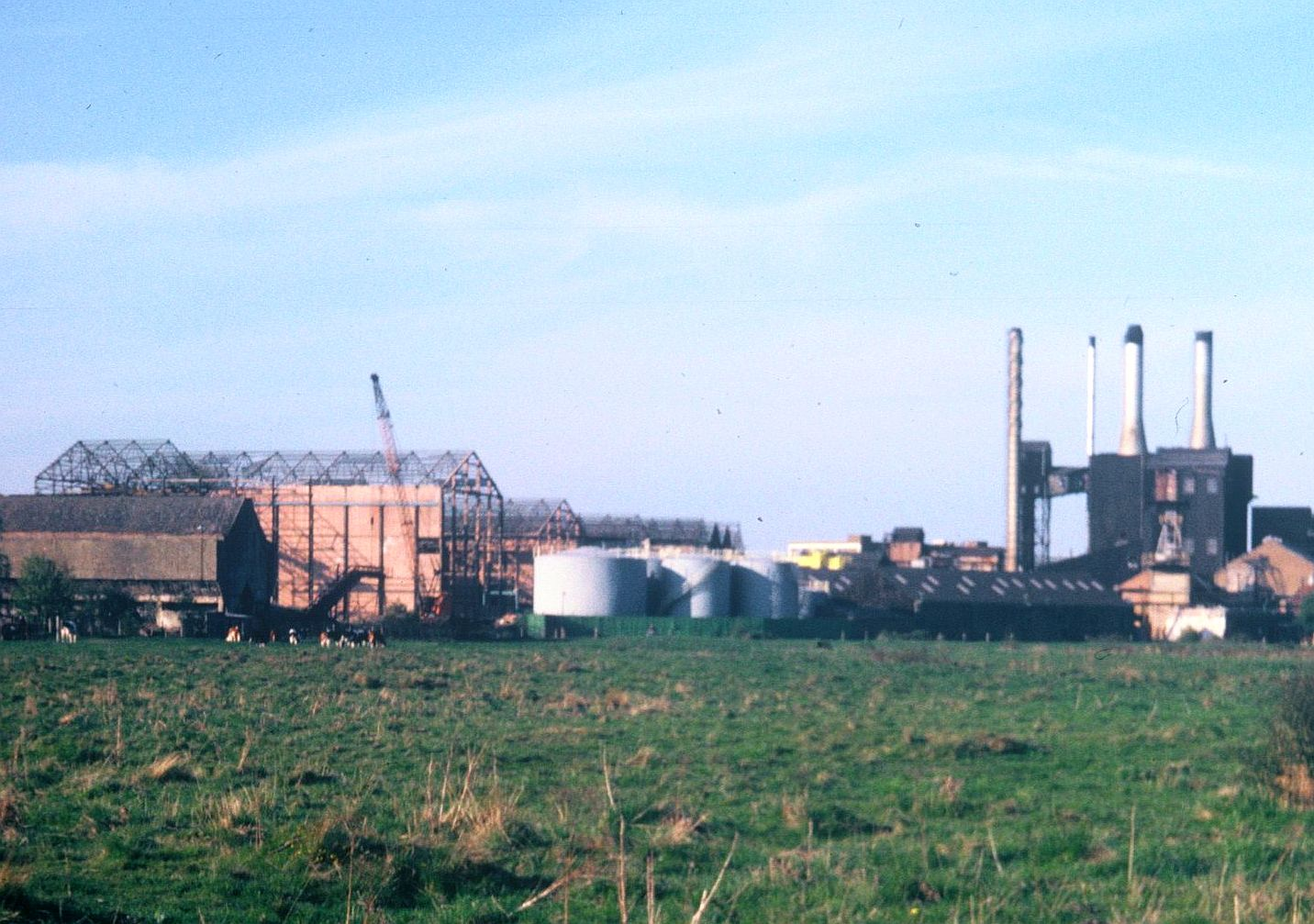
Croxley Paper Mills being demolished in 1982

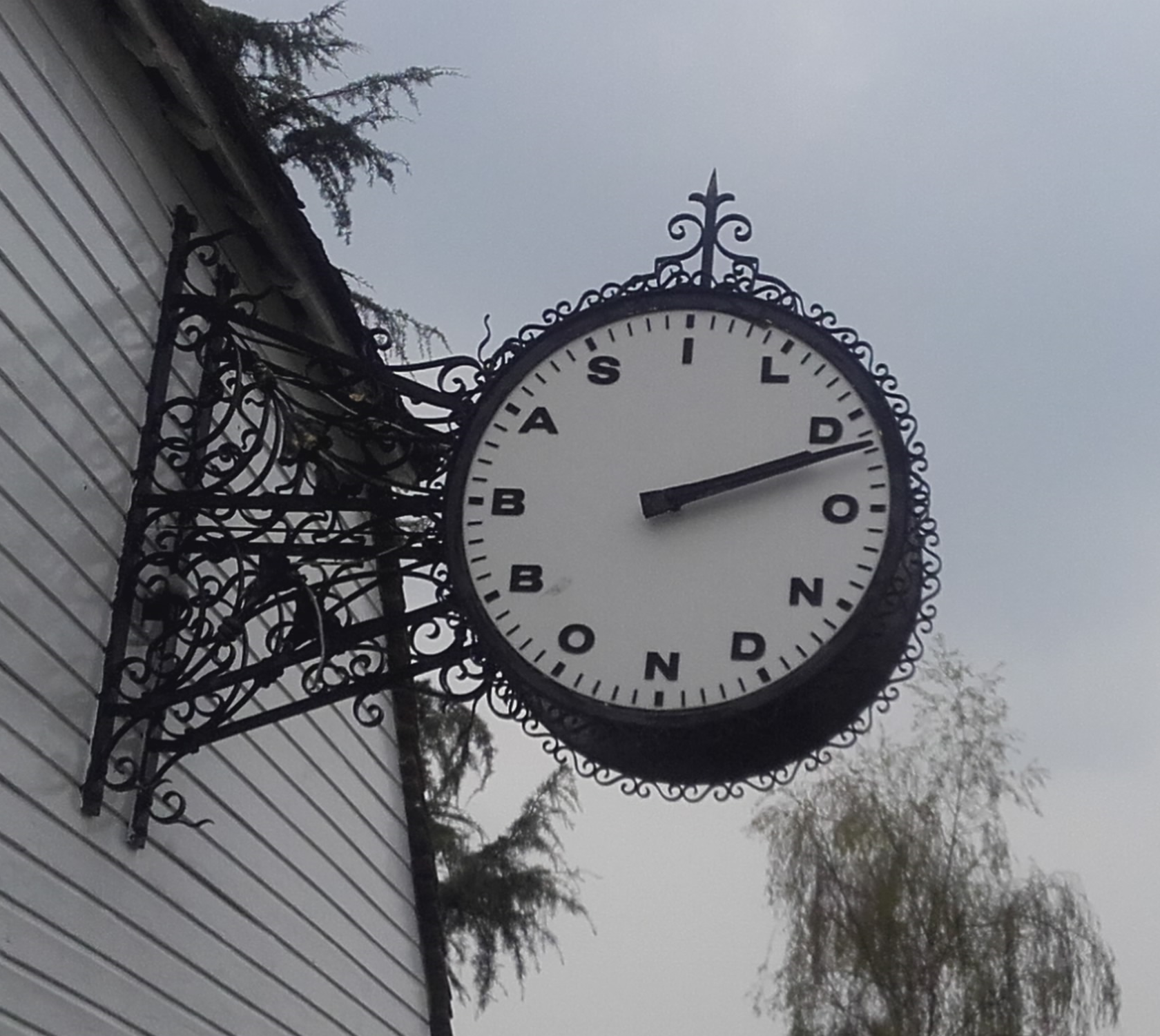
The Basildon Bond clock at Apsley Mill

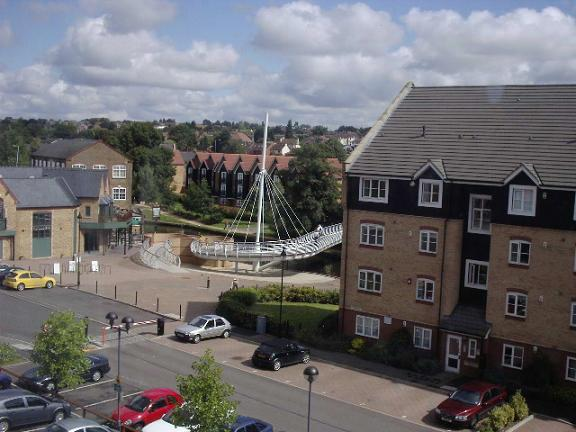
Dickinson's former Apsley Mill, redeveloped as a residential site

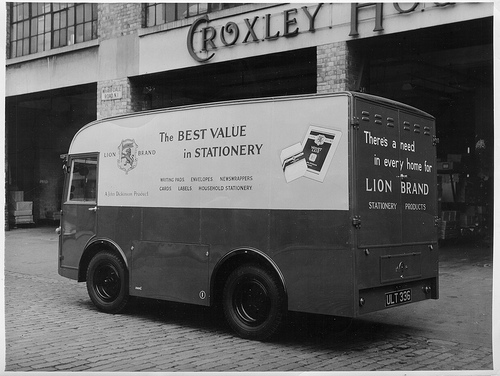
A Lion Brand electric delivery van in 1959

John Dickinson Stationery Limited was a leading English stationery company founded in southwest Hertfordshire. In the 19th century, the company pioneered a number of innovations in papermaking. It became part of Dickinson Robinson Group in 1966; after changes of ownership, the John Dickinson brand was retired in 2008.

== History ==
John Dickinson began his business life as a stationer in the City of London in 1804. But around 1802 he had already started to experiment with papermaking machinery and obtained a first patent for cutting paper in 1807. Two years later Dickinson patented a new continuous mechanized papermaking process. In the same year he gained financial backing from George Longman, whose family controlled the Longman publishing firm, and formed a new company, called Longman & Dickinson. In addition a considerable sum of money was borrowed from the printer and MP Andrew Strahan (1749–1831).

Dickinson bought his first paper mill at Apsley, Hertfordshire (Apsley Mill, a former flour mill) in 1809, and a second nearby (Nash Mill, formerly a mediaeval corn-mill) in 1811; both took water from the Grand Junction Canal (opened in 1800 and joined the Grand Union Canal) which also provided transport for materials and product. Between 1828 and 1830 he built a third mill at Croxley, also on the canal.

The mill-house at Nash Mill, called Nash House, became the family home of Dickinson and his new wife Ann (née Grover), whose father Harry Grover supported this business development through his Hemel Hempstead Bank (later part of Lloyds Bank) in Hemel Hempstead. Soon Nash Mills was renowned for its production of tough thin paper for Samuel Bagster's "Pocket Reference Bible". A major fire in 1813 was a setback, but, being covered by insurance, enabled redevelopment towards large scale production.

Later in the 19th century, Sir John Evans and his son Lewis Evans (whose elder brother was the archaeologist Sir Arthur Evans) both managed the company. After John Evans had given up his partnership in the company in 1885, it was formally incorporated as John Dickinson & Co. Limited the following year, with a capital of £500,000. At the same time, the company started to concentrate more on the stationery side of the business, since papermaking was no longer profitable. The Apsley plant was reconstructed and concentrated on making envelopes, while paper production was transferred to the more modern Croxley Mill.

John Dickinson & Co. Ltd had their own engineering department at Nash Mills until 1888, when it was gradually transferred to Apsley Mill; by 1903 the department was merely a repair shop. At the end of the 19th century, Nash Mill, which was small and had a reputation for independence, experienced a drop in profitability. Continuous minor changes were implemented until 1926, when it was expanded, remodelled and refurbished. The Lion Brand was adopted as the company logo in 1910.

=== Basildon Bond ===
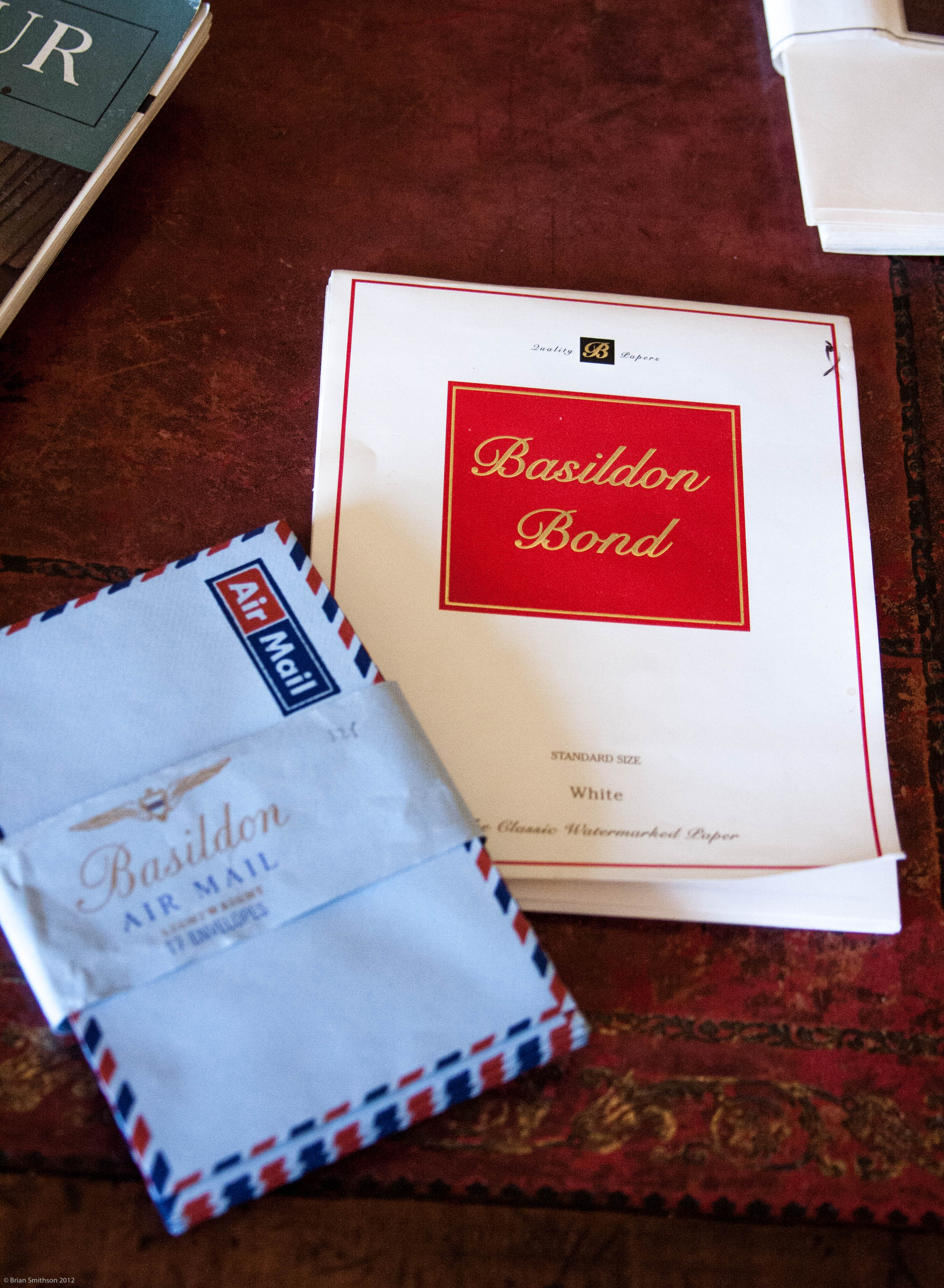
Basildon Bond stationery

The Basildon Bond brand of stationery was created by Millington and Sons in 1911. The brand is named after Basildon Park, where some of Millington's directors were staying, and they liked the alliteration of "Basildon" and "bond". Millington & Sons was acquired by John Dickinson in 1918, who then took over the Basildon Bond brand. The name "Basildon Bond" was used by comedian Russ Abbot for one of his characters.

=== Innovations ===
John Dickinson patented a method of papermaking in June 1809 that rendered his rivals' techniques (principally the Fourdrinier machine) obsolete. In 1850, the company started mechanical envelope manufacturing, with gummed envelopes for the first time. The production of fine rag paper on electrically driven machines was a successful innovation at Nash Mill.

=== Second World War ===
The company produced various paper and cardboard products for the war effort, and also branched out into engineering, producing items such as fuel tanks for long range fighter aircraft, 20 mm cannon shells, aircraft fuel pumps, magnetos and spark plugs. The company made the foil strips codenamed Window used by the RAF to blind enemy radar.

=== Dickinson Robinson Group ===
Dickinson Robinson Group Ltd (DRG) was formed out of E. S. & A. Robinson Packaging of Bristol and John Dickinson & Co Ltd. in 1966, creating one of the world's largest stationery and packaging companies. In 1989, the asset-stripper Roland Franklin (Pembridge Investments) acquired DRG (including the Royal Sovereign group acquired in 1978) in a leveraged buyout worth £900 million.

=== Fate ===
Pembridge Investments carved the Dickinson Robinson Group up and sold its parts for a profit to various other companies:

- In 1990 it sold the paper mills in the group – Nash Mills, Keynsham Paper Mill and Fife Paper Mills – to Sappi of South Africa. These mills were subsequently closed by Sappi as were all other acquisitions (Kymmini Oy, Blackburn Mill and Wolvercote Mill) they had made in the UK.
- Also in 1990, DRG Stationery was acquired by Biber Holding AG of Switzerland and renamed John Dickinson Stationery. After Biber became insolvent in 1996, John Dickinson Stationery was sold in the same year to Spicers Ltd, then a subsidiary of DS Smith, and moved from Apsley to the village of Sawston, south of Cambridge. In 2005, John Dickinson Stationery was purchased by the French stationery manufacturer Hamelin Group. Rebranded in 2008 as Hamelin Brands, the company moved to Red Lodge, Suffolk.
- In 1992, DRG Packaging was acquired by Bowater plc (later Rexam).

== Frogmore Paper Mill ==
Just north of the former Apsley Mill site in Hemel Hempstead is Frogmore Paper Mill, the world's oldest mechanised paper mill. It was here that Bryan Donkin first demonstrated the papermaking machine he developed for the Fourdrinier brothers. It remains operational by a conservation and education charitable trust.

== Black n' Red ==
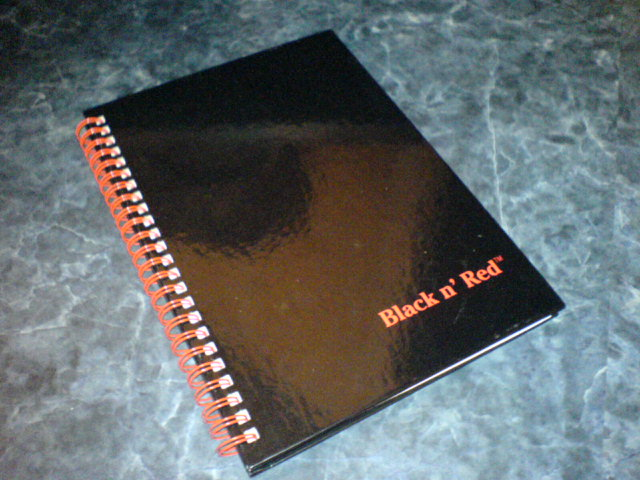
'Black n' Red' book with side binding

Black n' Red, a brand of books and pads of paper produced by John Dickinson Stationery Limited, featured a striking black and red design. The front and back covers of such books are black, with the text "Black n' Red" written in red in the bottom right corner of the cover. The spine or bind is also red. These books have become distributed by the Oxford brand within the Hamelin Group.
