= Nash Mill =

Coordinates: 51.729715°N 0.453393°W

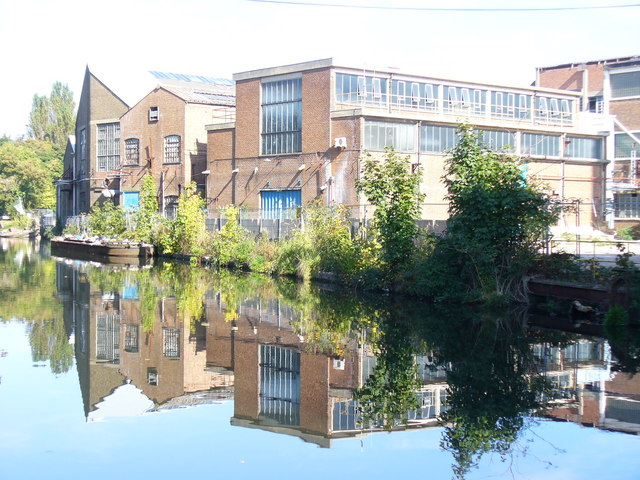
Nash Mill

Nash Mill was a paper mill near Hemel Hempstead, Hertfordshire, United Kingdom. The local residential area (Nash Mills) takes its name from the mill.

== Early records ==
There was originally a corn-mill recorded in the Domesday Book.

== Paper mill ==
The mill was converted to papermaking by Anne Blackwell at the end of the eighteenth century. It was purchased by John Dickinson in 1811. It was a half mile south from Dickinson's original Apsley Mill at Apsley on the Grand Junction Canal. The mill-house, called Nash House, became the family home for Dickinson and his new wife Ann (née Grover) whose father Harry Grover supported this business development through his Grover's Bank. In a very few years Nash Mill was renowned for its production of tough thin paper for Samuel Bagster's "Pocket Reference Bible".

A major fire in 1813 was a setback, but, being covered by insurance, enabled redevelopment towards large scale production and by 1825 steam power had been installed, powered by coal delivered by canal. John Dickinson & Co. had their Engineering Department at Nash Mills until 1888 (managed by Leonard Stephenson), when it was transferred to Apsley Mill. The production of fine rag paper on electrically driven machines was a successful innovation at Nash.

There was unrest amongst the workers in 1821 when pay was cut in response to declining trade. Local leaders of the Original Society of Papermakers were dismissed and replaced by recruits from Abbots Langley. The dismissed workers and their families, living in tied cottages, suffered distress and some "went on the parish". After some disruption and even sabotage, the situation calmed.

In 1823 and in 1826, there were repeated mechanical problems. The mill maintained its own fire brigade with a steam fire engine.

== Closure and redevelopment ==
In 1990, Nash Mill was sold to the international Sappi Group and continued to make paper until 2006. The mill was closed and subsequently sold; the warehouse business was relocated to Dunstable. Housing redevelopment plans were publicised in September 2009. By late 2010, the site had been largely cleared, retaining Nash House, Stephenson's Cottage and a war memorial.
