= Abbot's Hill School =

Location
- Bunkers Lane; Hemel Hempstead, Hertfordshire, HP3 8RP; England; 51.729407°N 0.443509°W

Information
- Type: Independent School
- Religious affiliation: CofE
- Established: 1912
- Local authority: Hertfordshire
- Department for Education URN: 117600 Tables
- Chairman of Governors: Elliot Lipton
- Head: Sharon Schanschieff
- Staff: 200
- Gender: Girls: 0 to 16; Boys: 0 to 4
- Enrolment: 380
- Capacity: 600
- Houses: Cameron, MacDonald and Macneil
- Website: www.abbotshill.herts.sch.uk

Abbot's Hill School is an independent day school for pupils aged 4–16 years and a day nursery and pre-school for girls and boys from 6 months in Hemel Hempstead, Hertfordshire in the United Kingdom.

== History ==
The School celebrated its 100th anniversary in 2012, having been founded on the present site by Alice, Katrine and Mary Baird who also ran a school in the Malverns. The school's central building was built in 1836 by the paper manufacturer, John Dickinson, as a home for him and his family; he named it Abbot's Hill. John Dickinson's grandson sold Abbot's Hill to the Baird sisters.

In 1969 St Nicholas House School moved to the Abbot's Hill site to form the junior department, and in 2003 boarding at the school ended.

== Abbot's Hill House ==
It had been the home of the inventor and entrepreneur John Dickinson (1782–1869) who was his own architect in its building, just east of his paper mill, Nash Mill. Construction commenced in 1836. The building material was unusual, being dark grey stone setts, taken from the railway lines when replaced by wooden sleepers. The house design was unusual, having only a single door to the outside despite its size. John Dickinson's youngest daughter Harriet Ann (1823–1858) married Sir John Evans, KCB (1823–1908), and their son Sir Arthur John Evans (1851–1941) inherited Abbot's Hill but never lived there.

== Notable former pupils ==
- Jane Scott, Duchess of Buccleuch, model
- Katharine Elliot, Baroness Elliot of Harwood, public servant and politician
- Marilyn Okoro, British 800m and 4 × 400 m Athlete
- Honor Salmon (née Pitman), Air Transport Auxiliary pilot killed in service in Second World War.
