= DS Smith =

British multinational packaging business

DS Smith plc
- Type: Subsidiary
- Traded as: LSE: SMDS
- ISIN: GB0008220112
- Industry: Packaging
- Founded: 1940
- Headquarters: London
- Key people: David Robbie (Chairman); Tim Nicholls (CEO)
- Revenue: ▲£8,221 million (2023)
- Operating income: ▲£748 million (2023)
- Net income: ▲£503 million (2023)
- Number of employees: 30,168 (2023)
- Parent: International Paper
- Website: dssmith.com

DS Smith plc is a British multinational packaging business, headquartered in London. It was listed on the London Stock Exchange until it was acquired by International Paper in January 2025.

== History ==
The business was founded by two cousins, David Gabriel Smith and David Solomon Smith in 1940, to manufacture cartons. It was first listed on the London Stock Exchange in the late 1950s.

In 1986 the company acquired St Regis Paper Company and in 1988 Kemsley Paper Mill, both paper manufacturing businesses. In 1991 the business bought Kaysersberg Packaging, a leading packaging business, and in 1993 it bought Spicers, an office products wholesaler. In 1996 it acquired John Dickinson, an envelope manufacturer, and in 2004 it completed the purchase of Linpac Containers, a corrugated packaging manufacturer.

The company sold Spicers, its office products wholesaling business, for £200 million, in July 2011 and acquired the packaging division of Svenska Cellulosa Aktiebolaget for a net consideration of approximately €1.6 billion (c. £1.3 billion) in July 2012. It went on to complete the acquisition of Duropack for approximately €300m (c. £220m) in May 2015 and became a constituent of the FTSE 100 Index in December 2017. In August 2023, it was announced DS Smith had acquired the Valjevo-based packaging company, Bosis doo.

On 19 February 2024, DS Smith announced a €13 million investment to enhance the production capacity of its Margarethen am Moos and Kalsdorf bei Graz facilities in Austria by up to 20%, as part of its growth strategy in Eastern Europe and commitment to the sustainable packaging market.

In March 2024, the company's board indicated that it had agreed a takeover offer worth £5.1 billion from packaging business, Mondi. In April, the company agreed to a larger £5.8 billion ($7.2 billion) all stock deal from the U.S. paper and pulp company, International Paper. The transaction was approved by the court on 30 January 2025, so allowing the takeover to complete.

== Operations ==
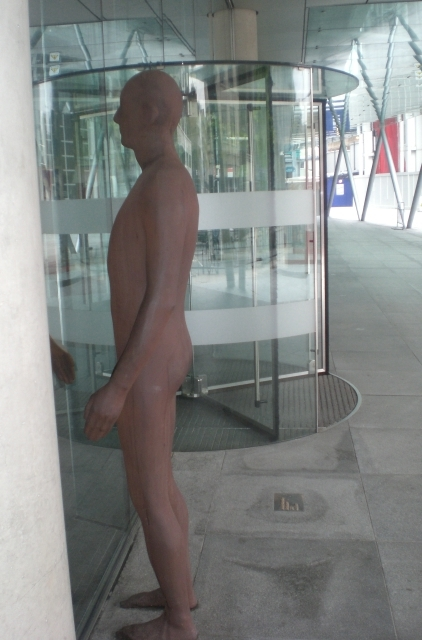
Sculpture by Sir Antony Gormley outside DS Smith's former head office in Euston Road.

DS Smith operates fibre-based packaging factories in Europe and the United States, with recycling and papermaking operations. The company has sites in 37 countries.
