= Lewis Evans (collector) =

English businessman and scientific instrument collector (1853–1930)

- Born: 1853; Abbots Langley, Hertfordshire, England
- Died: 25 September 1930 (aged 76–77); Dawlish, Devon, England
- Occupation: Businessman (paper maker)
- Known for: collector of scientific instruments
- Spouse: Eva Fanny Evans (nee Bradford)

Lewis Evans (1853–1930) was an English businessman and scientific instrument collector. His collection was the nucleus of the History of Science Museum, Oxford.

He was the son of Sir John Evans, an archaeologist, and younger brother of the more famous archaeologist Sir Arthur Evans (1851–1941) who excavated the archaeological site Knossos in the island of Crete, Greece. He studied chemistry at University College London and became a businessman. During his career, he rose to the chairman role in the family paper-making firm John Dickinson & Co. Ltd and lived at Russels, a country house near the company's paper mill, close to Watford.

Over the course of approximately fifty years, Evans also built up an important collection of scientific instruments. In 1924, he presented this collection of sundials, astrolabes, early mathematical instruments and associated library of early books to the University of Oxford. The Lewis Evans Collection was made accessible to the public in the same year and he was awarded an honorary Doctor of Science degree by the university in 1925.

Through the efforts of his friend Robert Gunther, Evans donation helped in the founding of the History of Science Museum, Oxford in 1930 by providing what became known as the Lewis Evans Collection of Historic Scientific Instruments, the core of the museum's initial collection. The museum was originally called the Lewis Evans Collection but with the addition of material from other sources, the name was changed in 1935 to the Museum of the History of Science and in 2018, to the History of Science Museum. His library is also owned by the museum.

Lewis Evans became a major shareholder of Watford FC upon its incorporation as a limited company in 1909 and acted as chairman of the football club between 1909 and 1914; he had earlier played football for Hertfordshire Rangers F.C.
