= Apsley Mill =

Paper mill in Hertfordshire, England

Coordinates: 51.7334°N 0.4624°W

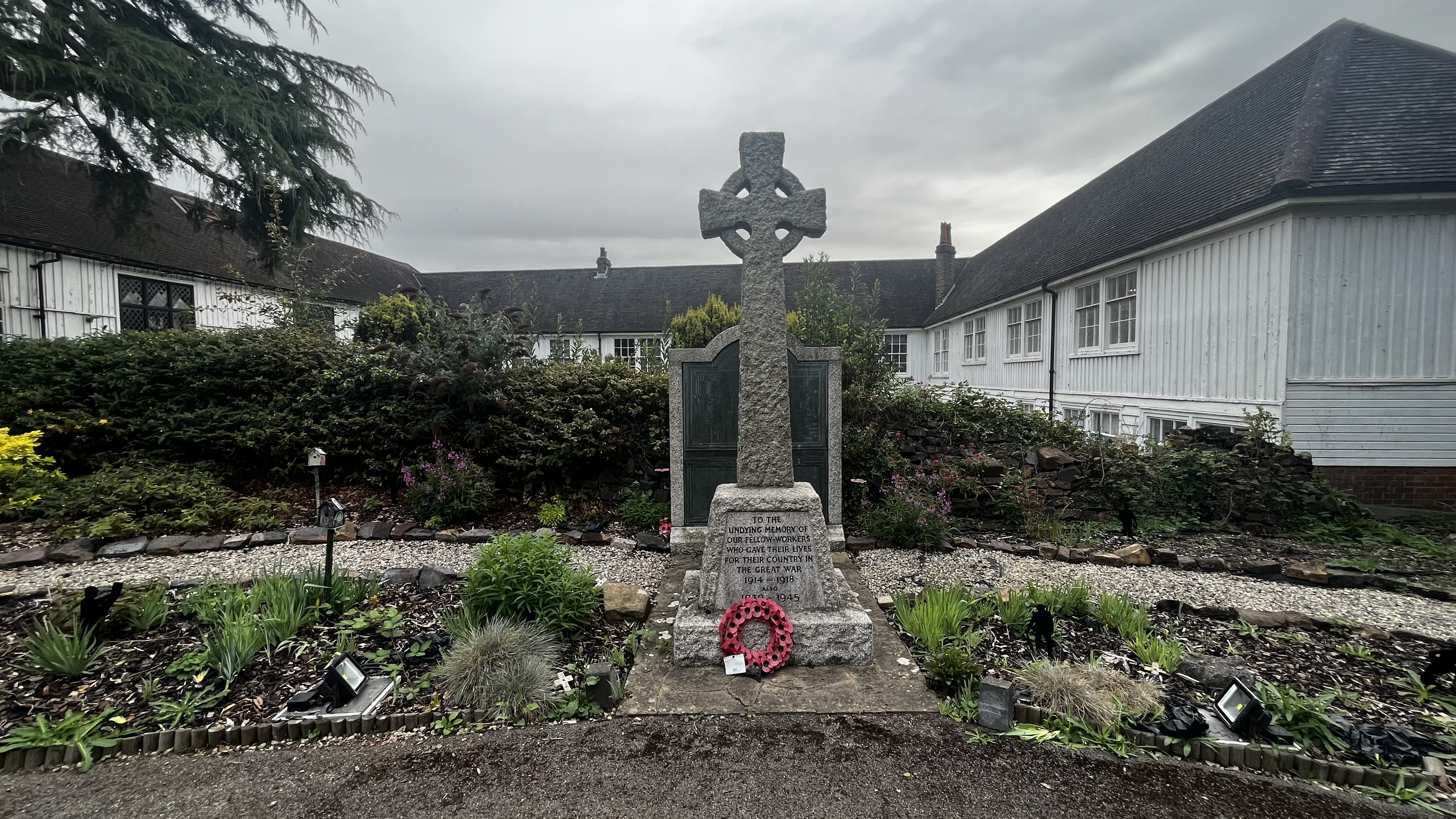
The war memorial and (behind it) Apsley Mill Cottage, all that remains of Apsley Mill

Apsley Mill was a paper mill at Apsley, near Hemel Hempstead, Hertfordshire, United Kingdom.

== Early records ==
There was originally a corn-mill recorded in the Domesday Book.

== Paper mill ==
The mill was converted to papermaking by George Stafford in 1778, and was purchased by John Dickinson in 1809. At Apsley Mill, Dickinson installed a new kind of paper machine, the Cylinder Mould Machine. Rather than pouring a dilute pulp suspension onto an endlessly revolving flat wire, this machine used a cylinder covered in wire as the mould. A cylindrical mould is partially submerged in the vat, containing a pulp suspension, and then, as the mould rotates, the water is sucked through the wire, leaving a thin layer of fibres deposited on the cylinder. The mill supplied cartridge paper for the British Army during the Napoleonic Wars, and produced envelopes, cards, ledgers and railway tickets, rather than paper, from 1888. The stationery products were branded Basildon Bond, Three Candlesticks, Lion Brand and Challenge Notebooks.

During the 1930s, the site became a vast industrial complex with the building now known as Apsley Mill Cottage, with its oak-panelled boardroom, at its centre. Following a change in ownership, Apsley Mill ceased the manufacture of stationery in 1999.

The war memorial, which is a grade II listed building, and Apsley Mill Cottage, which is also grade II listed, are all that remains of Apsley Mill. The remainder of the site is now occupied by Apsley Mills Retail Park (to the northwest), by residential developments and the Paper Mill public house, operated by Fuller's, (behind) and by the Holiday Inn Express Hemel Hempstead to the southeast.
