= Sappi =

South African pulp and paper company

Sappi Limited
- Type: Public
- Traded as: JSE: SAP
- Founded: 1936
- Headquarters: Johannesburg, South Africa
- Key people: Sir Nigel Rudd (Chairman); Stephen (Steve) Robert Binnie (CEO); Glen Thomas Pearce (CFO)
- Products: Paper, pulp
- Revenue: ▼US$5.809 billion (2023)
- Operating income: ▼US$432 million (2023)
- Net income: ▲US$210 million (2023)
- Total assets: ▲US$3.53 billion (2023)
- Total equity: ▲US$2.44 billion (2023)
- Number of employees: 12,329 (2023)
- Website: www.sappi.com

Sappi Limited, originally incorporated as South African Pulp and Paper Industries Limited in 1936, is a South African pulp and paper company with global operations.

== Products and operation ==
South African Pulp and Paper Industries Limited was founded in 1936. The company is now known as Sappi and is headquartered in Johannesburg, It produces and sells commodity paper products, pulp, dissolving pulp, and forest and timber products for Southern Africa and export markets. In 2013, it was the world's largest producer of dissolving pulp.

In 2003, Sappi announced that Andre Wagenaar had been appointed as the CEO of Sappi's Forest Products Division, with effect from 1 January 2004, when Dr John Job relinquished his responsibilities for the Southern African businesses.

As of 1 July 2014, Steve Binnie became Sappi's CEO. His predecessor, Ralph Boettger, resigned for health reasons having been CEO from 2007.

In July 2019, Michael G. Haws was appointed as president and CEO of Sappi North America, succeeding Mark Gardner who retired at the end of September 2019.

== Global acquisitions and closures ==
In 1990, Sappi purchased the paper mills of UK Dickinson Robinson Group – Nash Mills, Keynsham Paper Mill and Fife Paper Mills from the asset-stripper Roland Franklin (Pembridge Investments). These mills were subsequently closed by Sappi as were all other acquisitions (Kymmene Oy, Blackburn Mill and Wolvercote Mill) they had made in the UK.

On 29 September 2008, Sappi purchased two paper mills in Finland, one in Switzerland and one in Germany from the M-real company. In the United States, Sappi closed its Muskegon, Michigan plant in 2009, which was founded in 1899 by the Central Paper Company. In 2011 Sappi announced closure of their Swiss production site. The company's existing kraft pulp plant in Cloquet, Minnesota was replaced by a new mill which began producing dissolving pulp in June 2013.

== Price fixing controversy ==
In 1996, Sappi along other 10 main producers of carbonless paper was investigated by the European Commission for illegal price fixing in various countries in the EU. Although found guilty of earning millions by fixing the price of printing paper, Sappi was granted full immunity from the fine due to its cooperation with the EC's cartel investigating unit. Other companies implicated were fined a total of $145 million.

== See also ==
- S. D. Warren Paper Mill: A Sappi facility in Westbrook, Maine, United States
