= John Dickinson (inventor) =

British inventor (1782–1869)

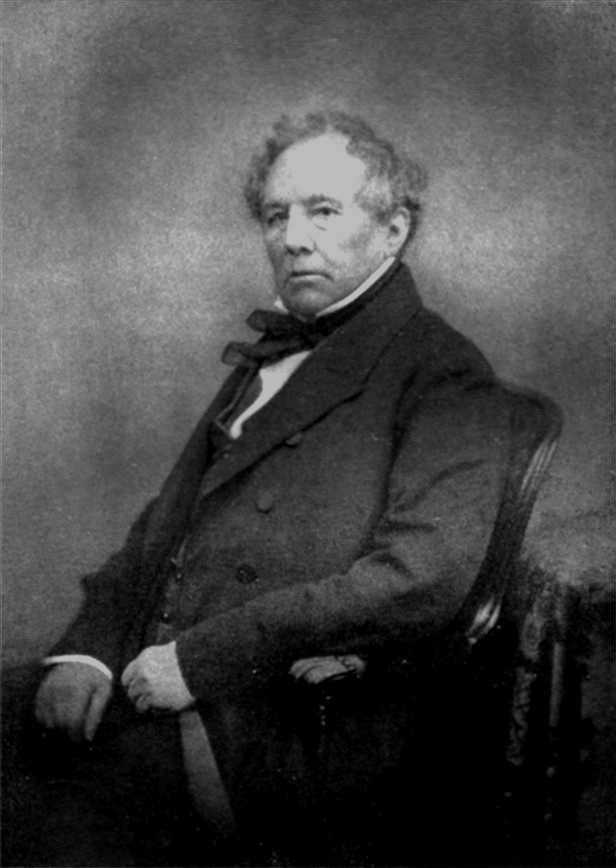
John Dickinson

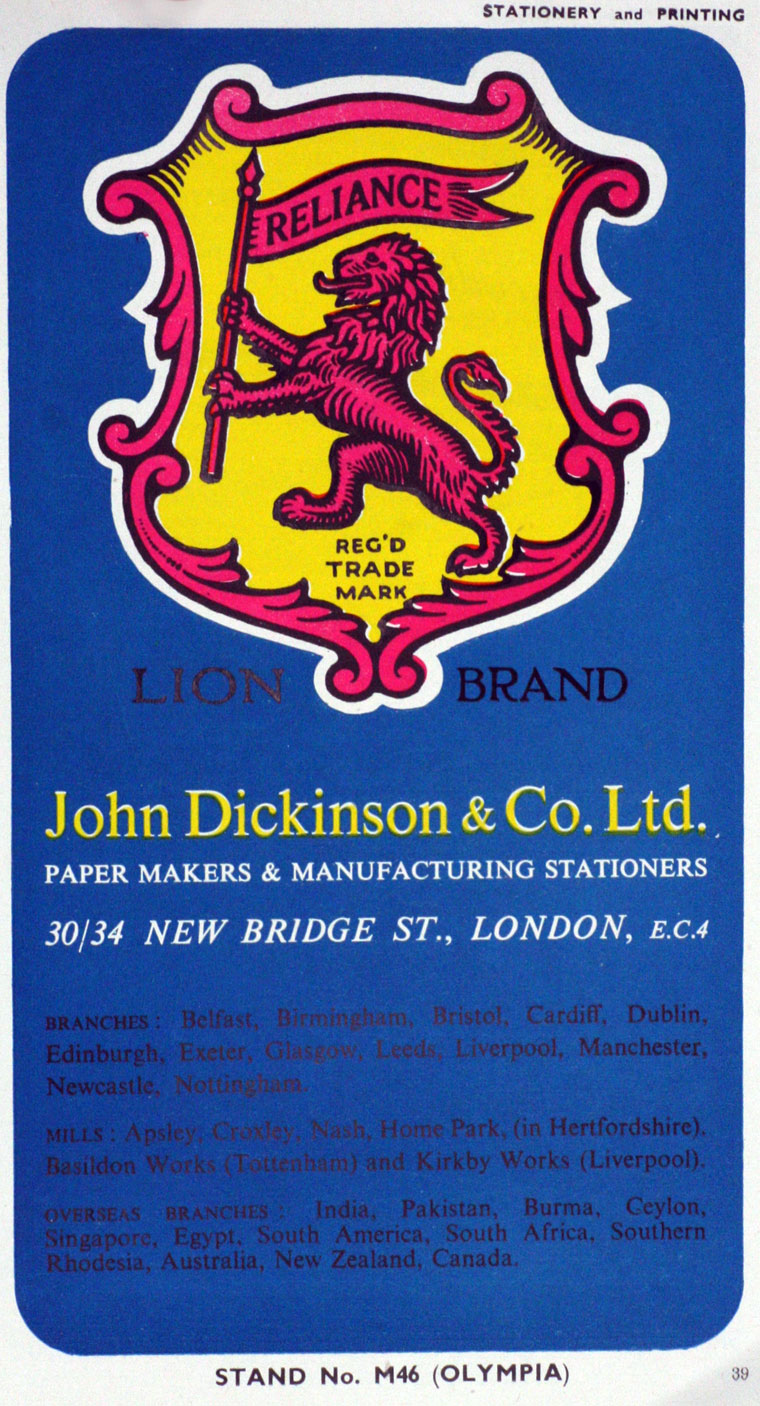
Advertisement from John Dickinson & Co. with its company logo „Lion Brand“

John Dickinson (29 March 1782 – 11 January 1869) was an Englishman who invented a continuous mechanised papermaking process. He established in 1809 the English paper and stationery producer Longman & Dickinson, which later evolved into John Dickinson Stationery.

== Early life ==
Dickinson was probably born in London, the eldest of nine children of Captain Thomas Dickinson RN (1754–1828) and his wife, Frances de Brissac (1760–1854). Thomas Dickinson was the superintendent of the Ordnance Transports at Woolwich and Frances Dickinson was the daughter of a French silk-weaver in Spitalfields. At the age of fifteen, Dickinson started a seven-year apprenticeship as a stationer with Messrs Harrison and Richardson in London. He was admitted to the Livery of the Stationers' Company in 1804 and began to trade, in stationery, in the City of London.

== Inventor ==
Dickinson demonstrated his resourceful nature by inventing a new kind of paper for cannon cartridges. This type of paper did not smoulder after the cannon had fired, which had been the cause of constant accidental explosions in the artillery. Until his time, paper was produced using rag and esparto, instead of the conventional wood pulp Dickinson patented his invention, and it was taken up by the army. It was said to have been of great value in the battles against Napoleon, increasing the British firing rate while simultaneously reducing premature firing accidents.

== Paper mills ==
Attempts had already been made to build a machine capable of the continuous manufacture of paper to replace the handmade techniques then used, notably by the Frenchman Henry Fourdriner. Dickinson patented his own design in 1809. In the same year he gained the financial backing from George Longman, whose family controlled the Longman publishing firm, and formed a new company, Longman & Dickinson. Money was borrowed from the printer and MP Andrew Strahan (1749–1831).

Dickinson was then able to purchase Apsley Mill which had already been converted to manufacture paper by the previous owner. George Stafford, the seller, had been one of Dickinson's suppliers. Dickinson installed his own machinery at the mill. In 1811 he bought a second paper mill in nearby Nash Mill (formerly a medieval corn-mill). Between 1828 and 1830, he built a third one in Croxley. The canal at Apsley, Nash Mills and Croxley provided power for the mills and transport for materials and product.

Penny Post, a paper containing silk threads, was produced by Dickinson, for security purposes. He also developed envelopes that had a gum-like adhesive to keep them closed. Production of those started in 1850. When Dickinson built himself a new house on the east of Nash Mills in 1836, he was his own architect. He called it Abbots Hill. It was located on a hillside site looking down upon his mills in the valley bottom.

In 1858, Dickinson passed on his thriving business to his nephew, John Evans. Over the years, the company has merged with several other stationery manufacturers. The most recent was with Hamelin Brands in 2008 From small beginnings, his company went on to become John Dickinson Stationery, one of the largest stationery manufacturers in the world.

== Dickinson paper making process ==
The process consisted of a perforated cylinder of metal, with a closely fitting cover of finely woven wire, which revolved in a vat of wood pulp. The water from the vat was carried off through the axis of the cylinder, leaving the fibres of the wood pulp clinging to the surface of the wire. An endless web of felt passed through what was known as a 'couching roller' lying upon the cylinder drew off the layer of pulp which when dried became paper.

== Family ==
In 1810, he married Ann Grover (1789–1874), daughter of Harry Grover (1761–1835), senior partner in the Hemel Hempstead Bank (now part of Lloyds Bank) in Hemel Hempstead. There were seven children. John Dickinson, the writer, was the eldest surviving son. One of the daughters, Harriet Ann, married her first cousin, son of Dickinson's sister Anne and her husband Arthur Benoni Evans. John Evans, Dickinson's nephew and son-in-law, took over the business, and also achieved eminence in several scholarly fields.

Dickinson's grandchildren included Sir Arthur John Evans (1851–1941), curator of the Ashmolean Museum and excavator of Minoan Crete, and his brother Lewis Evans (1853–1930), the collector. Their half-sister was Dame Joan Evans (1893–1977), a British historian of French and English mediaeval art, who was a great-niece of John Dickinson. According to family tradition the Dickinsons were distantly related to the American solicitor and politician John Dickinson (1732-1808), one of the Founding Fathers of the United States.
