= Kenneth Blair =

English entomologist

Kenneth Gloyne Blair
- Born: 22 December 1882; Nottingham, England
- Died: 11 December 1952 (aged 69)
- Known for: Blair's mocha, Blair's shoulder-knot and Blair's wainscot
- Scientific career
- Fields: Entomology
- Workplaces: Natural History Museum, London

Kenneth Gloyne Blair (22 December 1882 – 11 December 1952) was an English entomologist and coleopterist. He was president of the Royal Entomological Society in 1940 and 1941 and has two portraits in the National Portrait Gallery, London.

== Early life ==
He was born in 1882 at Nottingham to William Nisbet Blair and Annie Elizabeth Gloyne and educated, in London, at Highgate School and Birkbeck College.

== Career ==
In 1910 he joined the Natural History Museum, London as an assistant and became deputy keeper of entomology in 1932. He received his doctorate from the University of London in 1936 and was appointed president of the Royal Entomological Society in 1940 and 1941. Dr Blair retired to Freshwater, Isle of Wight, in 1943 where he discovered three moths which bear his name.

He published a number of papers on Coleoptera and Lepidoptera including lists of beetles and moths for the Isles of Scilly which greatly added to the knowledge of the natural history of the islands.

The three moths which bear his name are,

1. Blair's mocha (Cyclophora puppillaria) – a rare immigrant to Britain, Blair found the moth on the Isle of Wight in 1946 and it was thought to be a first for Britain. There are two specimens in the Cockayne Collection (Natural History Museum) with the label ″Scilly Isles. E. D. Wheeler″ which were wrongly identified as the false mocha (Cyclophora porata), then known as Ephyra porata and purchased by the museum in 1925.
2. Blair's shoulder-knot (Lithophane leautieri) – first recorded in Britain, by Blair, in 1951 and has now spread north into Scotland and Northern Ireland.
3. Blair's wainscot – first discovered in 1945, at Freshwater Marsh where it was recorded annually until 1951–52, when the marsh was drained, cut and burned and never seen there again. Five individuals (suspected immigrants) were record in southern England between 1952 and 1996 and since October 1996 several populations have been recorded on Dorset rivers.

Publications

- Blair, K G (1925). "The Lepidoptera of the Isles of Scilly". Entomologist. 58: 3–10;38.
- Blair, K G (1931). "The beetles of the Scilly Islands". Proceedings of the Zoological Society of London. 4: 1211–1258.

=== World War I ===
Blair enlisted in 1914 and served in France with the Seaforth Highlanders. He was invalided twice before being discharged in 1917.
