= Michael Bradshaw (actor) =

English actor (1933–2001)

- Born: 18 April 1933 (United Kingdom) Plumstead, London, England, UK
- Died: 13 December 2001 (aged 68); Newton, New Jersey, United States

Michael Bradshaw (18 April 1933 – 13 December 2001) was an English actor.

== Early life in England ==
Born in Plumstead, London, he grew up in Boxmoor, Hemel Hempstead, Hertfordshire to the north west of London. While growing up there he sang as a boy soprano in the Choir of St John's Church, Boxmoor and began working in non-professional theatre at the Hemel Hempstead Amateur Operatic and Dramatic Society, now known as the Hemel Hempstead Theatre Company. Once he left school he would train as a type setter and printer for most of his teen years at John Dickinson Stationery's Apsley Mill. In 1950, when he turned 18, he suspended his apprenticeship at John Dickinson's for mandatory service in the British armed forces ("National Service") which he served in the Royal Air Force. Over the next four years he would be stationed at both RAF Ternhill near Market Drayton, Shropshire as well as RAF Little Rissington, Gloucestershire and would reach the rank of Senior Aircraftsman. He would remain a member of the Royal Air Force Volunteer Reserve until 1964. He finished his formal apprenticeship at John Dickinson in August 1956.

== Canada ==
Bradshaw left Britain for Canada in 1956, initially living in Hamilton and then Burlington, Ontario where he found work as a school supplies salesman before he started working in local theatre, primarily with the Players' Guild of Hamilton. Notable productions there included "Murder in the Cathedral" as Thomas Becket, "The Heiress", "Arms and the Man", "Auntie Mame", "Separate Tables" "Pygmalion" as Henry Higgins, for which he won the Western Ontario Drama Festival Phelps Award for Best Actor in 1958 and Sir Thomas More in "A Man for All Seasons" for which he won the Henry Osborne Trophy for Best Actor in the Dominion of Canada Award at the Dominion Drama Festival in 1965. He also appeared in notable productions for the London Little Theatre in 1964, including My Fair Lady as Henry Higgins and as the title character in "Ross". Bradshaw appeared at the Shaw Festival during its early years, most notably in the 1966 season with Artistic Director Barry Morse. He appeared that year, alongside actors such as Zoe Caldwell, Paxton Whitehead and Susan Clark, in productions of "The Apple Cart" as Pamphilius and "Misalliance" as the pilot, Joey Percival.

== United States ==
In 1967 he began performing as part of the resident company at the Studio Arena Theater in Buffalo, New York with actors such as John Schuck. At the Studio Arena he appeared in productions such as Oh, Kay! as The Duke, The Man Who Came to Dinner as Beverley Carlton and Under Milk Wood, which he also directed. In late 1967 he was cast in his first Broadway production in Portrait of a Queen with Dame Dorothy Tutin which ran until April 1968. Through 1968 he performed with The Long Wharf Theatre in New Haven Connecticut, Hartford Stage Company in Hartford, Connecticut, The Woodstock Playhouse in Woodstock, New York and the Green Hills Theatre in Reading, Pennsylvania. In late 1968 he was cast as the Captain of the Inquisition in the first U.S. national touring company of Man of La Mancha with José Ferrer, which he toured with into the summer of 1969. In 1970 Bradshaw appeared in the Original Broadway production of Barry England's Conduct Unbecoming as Major Lionel Roach. Bradshaw received good notices for the production, Clive Barnes of The New York Times said he was "especially impressed.." by Bradshaw in the role of Roach in his review Bradshaw was nominated for a Tony Award for the Role.

In the 1970s he served as Production Stage Manager for the Starlight Theatre in Kansas City, Missouri, and then retired for most of the 1980s, working again as a printer and focusing on his family.

In the late '80s he began acting again, starting off small, appearing in community theatre and even directing several high school productions. Quickly he began appearing in smaller productions around the New England area, especially Boston where he worked extensively during the 1990s, most notably for The Lyric Stage Company of Boston, at which he performed in Oedipus Rex, Antigone, Pygmalion, Present Laughter, The Heiress, Entertaining Mr. Sloane, Juno and the Paycock and Mrs. Warren's Profession to name but a few. He gained quite a reputation in the area, performing for the Huntington Theatre Company in productions such as Arcadia and for the Commonwealth Shakespeare Company's 1997 performance of "Romeo and Juliet" as Friar Laurence, The first Commonwealth Shakespeare Company performance to take place at the Parkman Bandstand in Boston Common. He also appeared in productions for the Lyric West Theatre Company, The New Repertory Theatre, Boston Actors' Ensemble, Gloucester Stage Company and performed in the first ever Boston Theater Marathon. In 1998 he was nominated for the prestigious Elliot Norton Award for Outstanding Actor in a Small Company.

== Later life ==
It was around this time that he began to work in small roles in film, television and voice over work. He did the play by play voice over commentary for the Looking Glass Technologies British Open Championship Golf Computer Game in 1997, worked on the PBS documentary "Africans in America" appeared on "Unsolved Mysteries" and the PBS series Nova among other programmes. He appeared in advertisements for The History Channel and the Massachusetts Department of Public Health as well as small roles or extra work in the films The Crucible (1996), The Spanish Prisoner (1997), The Proposition (1998) and State and Main (2000).

In the early 2000s he continued theatre work around the country appearing in shows such as Nick Dear's The Art of Success as Sir Robert Walpole off Broadway at the Rubicon Theatre Company in New York and in Tennessee Williams' "The Night of the Iguana" as Nonno at the Dallas Theater Center in Dallas, Texas. He was scheduled to take part in the Washington, D.C. premiere of The Invention of Love at the Studio Theatre, but due to illness was forced to withdraw, the first time he'd ever been forced to leave a production in his career. His illness was diagnosed as cancer, and it grew worse until he finally succumbed on 13 December 2001 in a Newton, New Jersey hospital.

== Family ==
- Patricia Stevenson: 1960-1970. Had one son, Jeff.
- Rosemary Harvey: 1970-1976. Had one son, Michael.
- Patricia Hitz: 1976 until his death in 2001. Had two sons, Joshua and Jonathan.

== Sources ==
- L.W. Conolly, The Shaw Festival: The First Fifty Years, Oxford University Press; First Edition, October 9, 2011
- Brian Doherty, Not Bloody Likely: The Shaw Festival, 1962-1973, J. M. Dent & Sons (Canada); First Edition, 1974
- Hugh Waldwick, The Players' Guild of Hamilton: 1875-1975 First Edition, 1975
- Sheila M.F. Johnston, Let's Go to The Grand!: 100 Years of Entertainment at London's Grand Theatre, Dundurn Press, First Edition 2001
- Kathleen H. Thorne, The Story of Starlight Theatre: The History of Kansas City's Delightful Musical Theatre Under the Stars, Generation Organization, Eugene, Oregon, U.S.A. First Edition 1992
- John Willis, Theatre World: Volume 24 1967-1968 Crown Publishers Inc., First Edition 1968
- John Willis, Theatre World: Volume 27 1970-1971 Crown Publishers Inc., First Edition 1971
- Boston Globe; Obituary, 23 December 2001
- Globe and Mail; 14 April 1958; Pg. 14
- Globe and Mail; 31 May 1965; Pg. 15
- The Kingston Daily Freeman, Kingston, NY 5 July 1968 Pg. 24
- Backstage; July 31, 1998 – August 6, 1998 Pg. 6
- Backstage; June 23, 2000 – June 29, 2000 Pg. 44
