= Box Moor Trust =

Coordinates: 51°44′37″N 0°30′23″W

The Box Moor Trust
- Formation: 1594
- Legal status: Trust
- Purpose: The sustainable management of agricultural and amenity land extending to 487 acres of moors, commons, woodland and grassland and provision of environmental education facilities for the use and enjoyment of the residents and youth of the area of benefit of Hemel Hempstead and Bovingdon.
- Headquarters: Boxmoor, Hertfordshire
- Location: United Kingdom
- Region served: Hemel Hempstead & Bovingdon
- Key people: Patrick Schneiders (Chair)
- Main organ: Board of trustees
- Staff: 12
- Volunteers: 150
- Website: www.boxmoortrust.org.uk

The Box Moor Trust is a charitable trust responsible for the management of nearly 500 acres of land within the parishes of Hemel Hempstead and Bovingdon, in Hertfordshire, England. The trust was officially founded in 1594 in order to ensure that the land in the Boxmoor area remained free for residents to use and enjoy. As a result, almost all of the land that comprises the Box Moor Trust estate is open access, with just over a quarter being common land.

== History ==
In 1574 Queen Elizabeth I gifted certain Hertfordshire lands to Robert Dudley, 1st Earl of Leicester, some of the grounds in question had once formed the estate of the Monastery of Ashridge. Robert Dudley did not keep hold of the lands for very long as, on 11 May 1574 he sold them to Francis Russell, 2nd Earl of Bedford and Peter Graye of Segenhoe, Bedfordshire. Peter Graye subsequently acquired both shares of the property, and passed them down to his son, Richard Grey. It was from Richard Grey that yeomen John Rolfe and William Gladman, as well as landlord and shoemaker Richard Pope acquired the lands for £75 on 26 May 1581. They had feared the common land would be enclosed and townspeople would be denied grazing rights: the price had been raised by secret public subscription.

In 1594, ownership of the pastures was transferred to 67 local inhabitants (feoffes), "whereby their heirs and assigns might and should for ever thereafter have, hold and enjoy the said meadows and all the commodities that might or should arise thereof".

The trust, a legal entity formed in 1594, has survived over 400 years up to the present day. Twelve of the 67 feoffes were appointed as trustees with the powers to make orders and bye-laws that they deemed necessary. New trustee appointments were made in 1659, 1711, 1757 and 1787.

The highwayman Robert Snooks was hanged and buried at the scene of his crime on Boxmoor for the robbery of a postboy on the Sparrows Herne Turnpike which crossed the trust land. Snooks was the last man to be executed in England for highway robbery on 11 March 1802. The trustees placed a grave marker in 1904 at the approximate spot, and a subsequent footstone was added in 1994, as part of the trust's 400th anniversary. The field in which the stones lay is, suitably, named Snook's Moor.

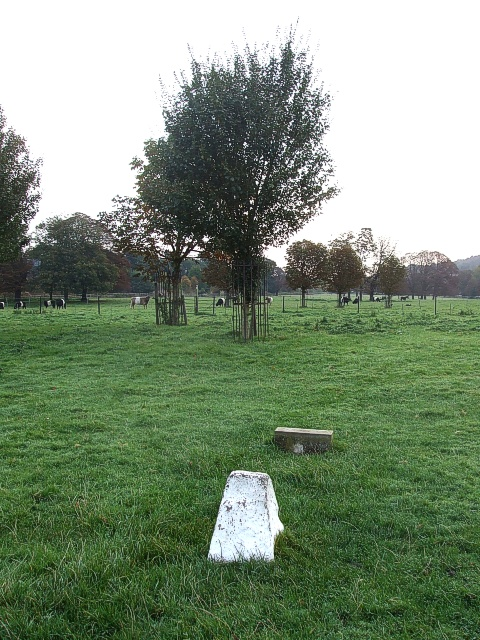
The grave of Robert Snooks. The white headstone was installed in 1904, whilst the footstone was laid in 1994.The Trust's Belted Galloways can be seen in the background.

St John's Church was built in 1874, on land the trust had provided in 1829.

== Governance ==
Boxmoor Act 1809
- Act of Parliament
- Parliament of the United Kingdom
- Long title: An Act for vesting in Trustees a certain Tract of Open Pasture Land called Box Moor, in the Parish of Hemel-hempsted, in the County of Hertford, upon certain Trusts, applying the Produce thereof, and for better securing the Rights of the respective Parties entitled to the said Moor.
- Citation: 49 Geo. 3. c. clxix

Dates
- Royal assent: 10 June 1809

Status: Partially repealed

Text of statute as originally enacted

The trust is an independent charity rather than a government institution. Originally founded and overseen by feoffees, the Box Moor Trust was formally established by the Boxmoor Act 1809 (49 Geo. 3. c. clxix), sometimes known as the Boxmoor Inclosure Act 1809. As a result, the trust is governed by a twelve-strong board of trustees, all of whom are elected by the beneficiaries of the trust; in this case, those residents of Hemel Hempstead and Bovingdon who are listed on the electoral roll. The trustees hold and operate the land on behalf of the beneficiaries, it having been legally transferred to them by the remaining inheritors of the original feoffees.

Charities (Boxmoor Estate, Hemel Hempstead) Order 2000
- Statutory Instrument
- Parliament of the United Kingdom
- Citation: SI 2000/844

Dates
- Made: 22 March 2000
- Commencement: 5 April 2000
Other legislation
Made under	Charities Act 1993

Text of the Charities (Boxmoor Estate, Hemel Hempstead) Order 2000 as in force today (including any amendments) within the United Kingdom, from legislation.gov.uk.

The Boxmoor Act 1809 was subsequently updated by Charity Commission schemes of 1921, 1930, 1935, 1951, 1952, 1956, 1956, 1962, 1967, 1970, 1979 and 1985; the latest of which is Charities (Boxmoor Estate, Hemel Hempstead) Order 2000 (SI 2000/844), and, aside from when Charity Commissioners' approval is needed for major expenditure, the trust is independent of other authorities and does not answer to local or central government.

== Land changes ==
There have been changes to the land that makes up the Box Moor Trust estate over time. Although a rare occurrence, parcels of the trust estate have, over the years, been sold or compulsorily purchased, usually for a transport scheme. The first instance was in 1797 when parcels of land were sold to the Grand Junction Canal Company, in order for the construction of the Grand Junction Canal to go ahead. The money received enabled to the trust to construct a wharf. Boxmoor Wharf played a key part in the continued existence of the trust due to the fact that it quickly became the transport hub of the town. Initially the main coal wharf for the town, it quickly became associated with spirits and wine, in particular port and sloe gin. The wharf was then operated for nearly 40 years by L. Rose and Co who were one of the last companies to use the canals for carrying cargo, which, in this case, was mainly Lime Juice. The site is still named Boxmoor Wharf and currently leased to DIY retailer B&Q.

The construction of the London and Birmingham Railway was another instance in which a corridor of land was purchase from the trust, with the price being £85 per acre (and not the £130 per acre that the trustees had requested). The money raised from the construction of the railway was used to purchase the plot of land now known as Blackbirds Moor. A second railway line, the Hemel Hempstead to Harpenden Railway, was built on a parcel of trust land, for which the trust received £2,000 in 1870.

Most recently, the construction of the A41 Bypass resulted in an exchange of land, with the trust receiving parcels of land now known as Gee's Meadow (which is located behind the Herdsman's Cottage), and Further Roughdown.

=== Additions ===
There have also been additions to the Box Moor Trust estate, the most recent and notable of which are listed below.

As part of the trust's 400th anniversary celebrations, 167 acres of land at Westbrook Hay was purchased. This site borders the grounds of Westbrook Hay School and was formerly part of the Ryder family estate as well as being the site of the Westbrook Hay Hill Climb. The purchase of this site brought the total acreage of the trust to approximately 400 acres. The Old Barn is a part of the Westbrook Hay site, and is used as the base for the trust's education programmes. Originally built in c. 1820, the Old Barn was renovated to its current state in November 2000.

Not long after, in January 2000, the trust added a further 36 acres with the acquisition of the former Bovingdon Brickworks site, making this the first area of the Estate to reside solely in Bovingdon. This former clay quarry has its own team of dedicated volunteers and is grazed by sheep as an organic management tool.

Pixie's Mere, a 4-acre fishing lake was acquired by the trust in 2003 and is operated under licence by a bailiff. The lake operates as a mixed fishery, and features Bream, Carp and Tench amongst others.

Gadespring is the Box Moor Trust's newest acquisition. Purchased in 2011 it is the site of a former Watercress farm, the four acre site will be sympathetically managed for the benefit of visitors with the overall aim to make a wildlife reserve. The trust runs monthly open days to celebrate the history of the watercress farm, as well as inform local residents of their plans for the site.

In January 2019 the trust held a public consultation about its plans to exchange five small parcels of land for one larger piece of land, Dellfield. The trust wished to de-register one of the smaller parcels of land to enable future development; this preregistration would remove the common land protection. In November 2020, the trust announced that their de-registration plans had failed, thus meaning their plans to develop part of the estate had also failed.

== Today ==
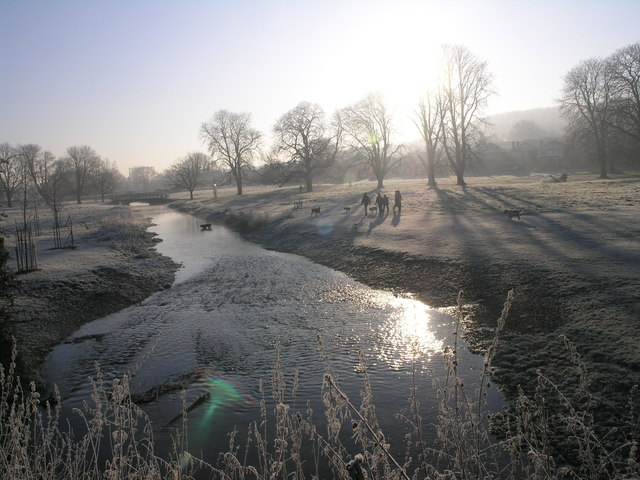
The River Bulbourne flows through the meadows which have formed the core of the Box Moor Trust land since 1581. This photograph shows the Bulbourne before the River restoration project was undertaken.

The trust has a herd of Belted Galloways, as well as a flock of sheep which is made up of Charollais, Norfolk Horns and Ryelands. The horses and ponies that graze Harding's Moor and Station Moor during the summer months are not owned by the trust, but are grazed on the trust's land by local graziers via the use of pasture tickets.

Other parcels of the trust estate are used for a variety of reasons. The trust plays home to three separate sports teams, Camelot RUFC Rugby Club play home games on Chaulden Meadow, Hemel Hempstead Town Cricket Club play at Heath Park, whilst Boxmoor Cricket Club call Blackbirds Moor home. Sheethanger Common, which is also owned by the trust formed, up until 2011, the grounds of the Boxmoor Golf Club.

The trust estate is also actively used by local community, with St John's Church in Boxmoor residing on Trust land. In addition, the trust hosts several community events. The annual Box Moor Trust Festival is held every September on Blackbirds Moor, and features local artisans and produce sellers and autumnal arts and crafts. Music on the Moor was a biannual music festival that was previously operated by the Box Moor Trust.

The River Bulbourne flows through part of the Box Moor Trust estate, and in January 2017 was the site of a major river restoration project. Working in conjunction with the Environment Agency the trust restored a kilometer stretch of the River where it flows through Boxmoor. The river in this location had been heavily modified in the past, and as a result was overly deep, straight and wide. As such, the restoration work was carried out in order to return the river to a more natural state. The bulk of this work was carried out in January 2017, whilst the creation of ephemeral ponds is due to take place in October, 2017.

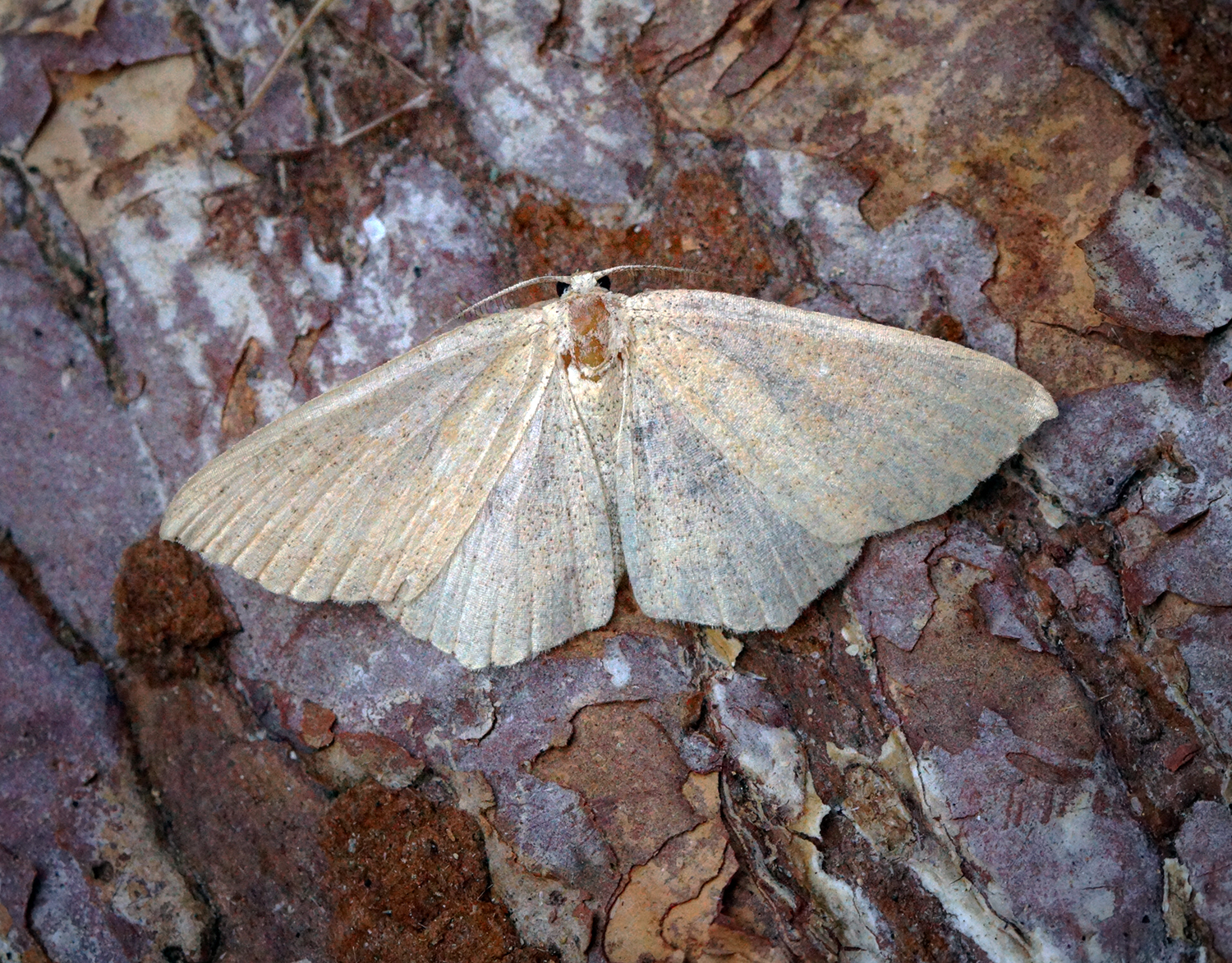
This Jersey Mocha was found on Roughdown Common, part of the Box Moor Trust estate.

Roughdown Common, a former chalk quarry, was purchased by the trust in 1886 and is one of Hertfordshire's few remaining examples of unimproved calcareous grassland. The combination of the scarcity of calcareous grassland, and the wide variety of flora found at the site, led it being designated as a Site of Special Scientific Interest in 1953. Flora prevalent on Roughdown Common includes Autumn Gentian, Bee Orchid, Cowslips and Pyramidal Orchid. Roughdown Common is also the only known place in Hertfordshire in which Juniper is able to regenerate naturally.

Providing a habitat for wildlife is important part of the trust's work. The recent river restoration carried out on the River Bulbourne saw the creation of a dedicated Kingfisher nesting box alongside the river, and a second nesting box has also been built at Gadespring. A long-held ambition of the trust is to see the reintroduction of Water Voles along the Bulbourne Valley. This ambition was realised in September 2019, when the Trust reintroduced 177 Water Voles in to the River Bulbourne as part of a three-year plan.

The Jersey Mocha was discovered in Hertfordshire for the first time on Roughdown Common in September 2016.

The trust is supported by volunteers, and currently has in excess of 150. Volunteering experiences are varied, and can range from fund-raising, wildlife surveys, to archiving and education.

In 2019, the trust celebrated its 425th anniversary. As part of the anniversary celebrations, the trust teamed with Puddingstone Distillery to release a gin made with Juniper harvested from Roughdown Common.
