= Boxmoor =

Area of Hertfordshire, England

Coordinates: 51.746282°N 0.486152°W

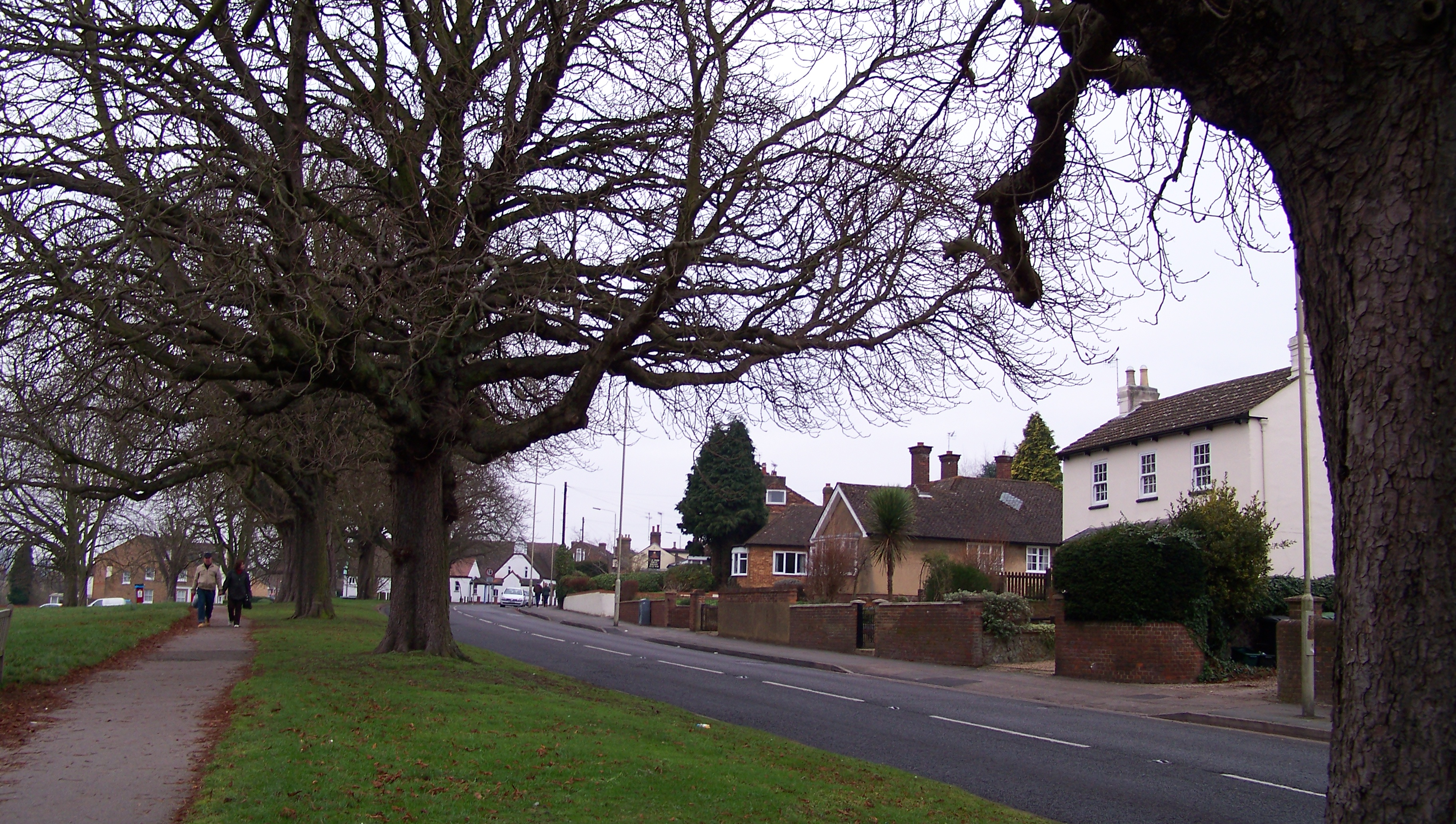
- St.John's Road, Boxmoor

- Location within Hertfordshire
- OS grid reference: TL046064
- Shire county: Hertfordshire
- Region: East
- Country: England
- Sovereign state: United Kingdom
- Post town: Hemel Hempstead
- Postcode district: HP1, HP3
- Dialling code: 01442
- Police: Hertfordshire
- Fire: Hertfordshire
- Ambulance: East of England
- UK Parliament: Hemel Hempstead

Boxmoor is part of Hemel Hempstead in Hertfordshire, England. It is within the district of Dacorum and comprises mainly 19th-century housing and meadowland, with transport links from London to the Midlands. At the 2011 Census, the population of Boxmoor was included in the Dacorum ward of Bovingdon, Flaunden and Chipperfield.

== Toponymy ==
The name Boxmoor derives from the box tree, a bushy inhabitant of the chalky hills that surround the location. This is linked together with the word 'mor', which signifies a marshy spot; Boxmoor's ancient watermeadows alongside the River Bulbourne are still a major feature of the locality.

== History ==
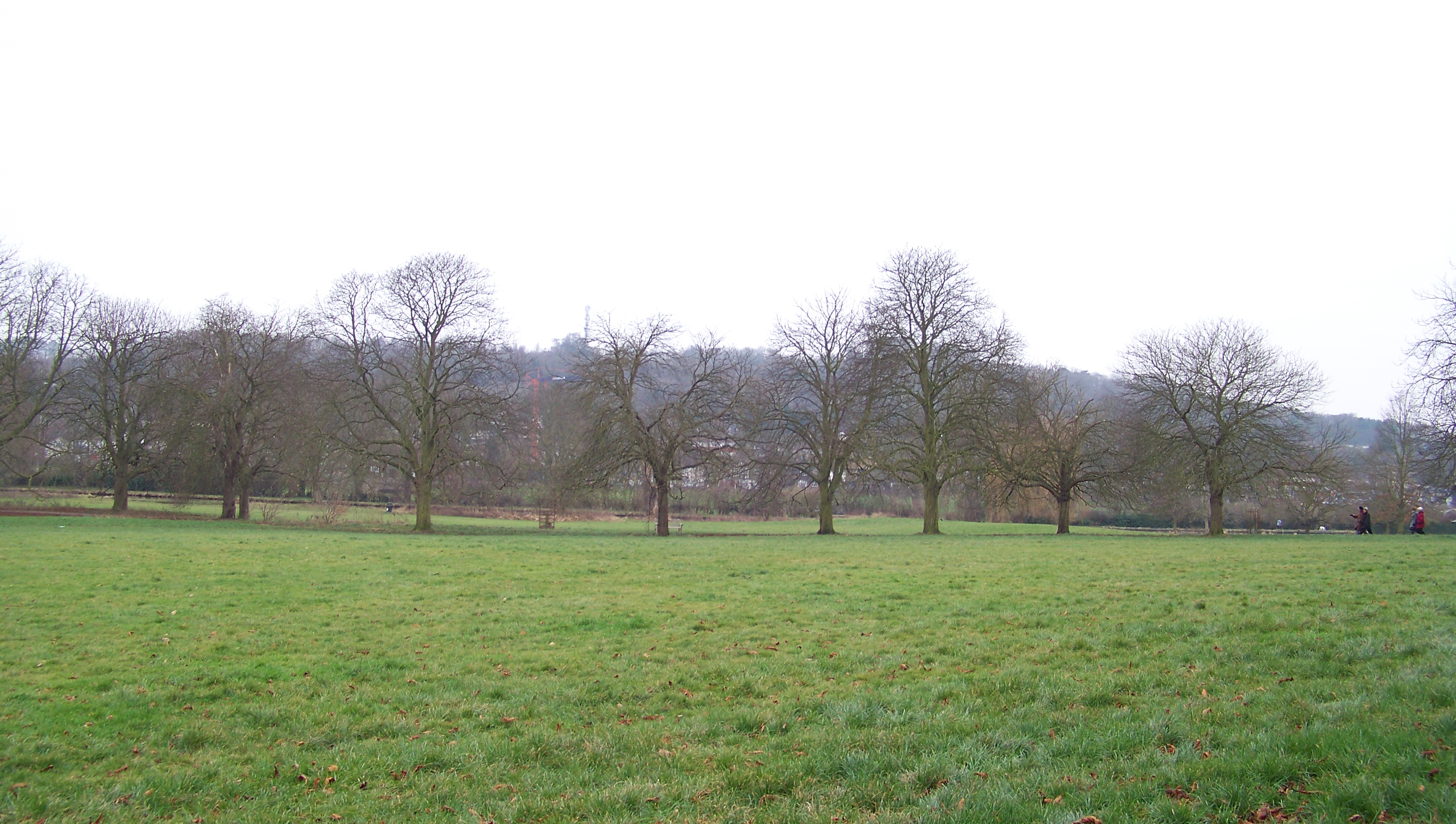
Blackbird Moor, managed by the Box Moor Trust

A Mesolithic camp site was discovered in 1975 on the site of what is now Boxmoor Trout Fishery, close to Fisheries' Wharf. Finds include pot boiler stones, bones of the wild ox, Bos Primigenius and a hand-crafted grinding quern made of the hard local rock known as Hertfordshire puddingstone. All were dated to around 1500 BCE. An even older stone axe head dated to 6000 BCE was also discovered.

The remains of a Roman villa have been found in the grounds of Boxmoor House School, near the railway station, dating from around the 1st or early 2nd century AD.

The Box Moor Trust owns meadow land in the area alongside the River Bulbourne. This was land purchased by tenants in secret during the 16th century to prevent it being enclosed, which would have deprived them of grazing. It is still held by the same trust established at that time. Today, it is used for summer grazing and has open access for recreational use.

The ancient Box Lane runs uphill from Boxmoor to Bovingdon. On this lane, close to the Boxmoor end, stood the historic early 17th century Box Lane Chapel. See the section below on places of worship.

The Sparrows Herne turnpike, set up in 1762, was the stagecoach route from London to Aylesbury; it passed along the valley bottom through Boxmoor following the present day London Road (A4251). The Grand Junction Canal, latterly known as the Grand Union, and the trunk canal from London to the Midlands followed along the same route in 1804. A local public house, the Fishery Inn, was an historic refreshment stop on the canal.

Boxmoor village itself was developed after 1837 when the London and Birmingham Railway was forced, by local landed interests, to build its main line and station about a mile to the west of Hemel town. Hemel Hempstead railway station, originally called Boxmoor, offered fast commuting to London combined with a small country town life, attractive to wealthier commuters; this stimulated the development of Victorian era housing near the station, but outside of the original bounds of Hemel Hempstead. In 1846, it became part of the London and North Western Railway (L&NWR).

In 1877, a branch line – known as the Nickey Line – was opened by the Midland Railway; it ran from Boxmoor station, through the now-disused Hemel Hempsted station closer to the town centre, to Harpenden. However, disputes between the railway companies prevented this from ever being used for a passenger connecting service and the railway station's link to Hemel town was always via horse, bus or on foot across the Boxmoor meadows. From 1912, Hemel Hempstead station was known as Boxmoor and Hemel Hempstead.

A 15th-century building, Heath Barn, was the home of the writer, Colonel Frederick Brereton from the 1920s until being converted for use as the music block of the Hemel Hempstead School in the 1950s.

The area was absorbed into the expanded Hemel Hempstead new town during the 1950s and 1960s, but retains a local character. In 1963, the station was renamed again, from Hemel Hempstead and Boxmoor to Hemel Hempstead, its current name.

A four-lane dual carriageway, the A41 trunk road, was built through the district in the 1990s, connecting the M25 to Aylesbury. This crosses Boxmoor meadows in a strip of land in which all the earlier links run side by side: turnpike, canal, railway and modern trunk road.

In 1889, Boxmoor Hall was built by the local trust from surplus funds. It has been used as a magistrates' court and, more recently, as an arts centre run by Dacorum Borough Council. In 2007, the hall became privately owned. It is now used for performing arts and is a licensed premises, hosting special occasions.

== Economy ==
The area has little industry and limited commerce but its mostly Victorian family houses are in demand for those who work elsewhere in Hemel Hempstead and especially commuters who use the railway station to reach London in around 30 minutes.

== Religious sites ==
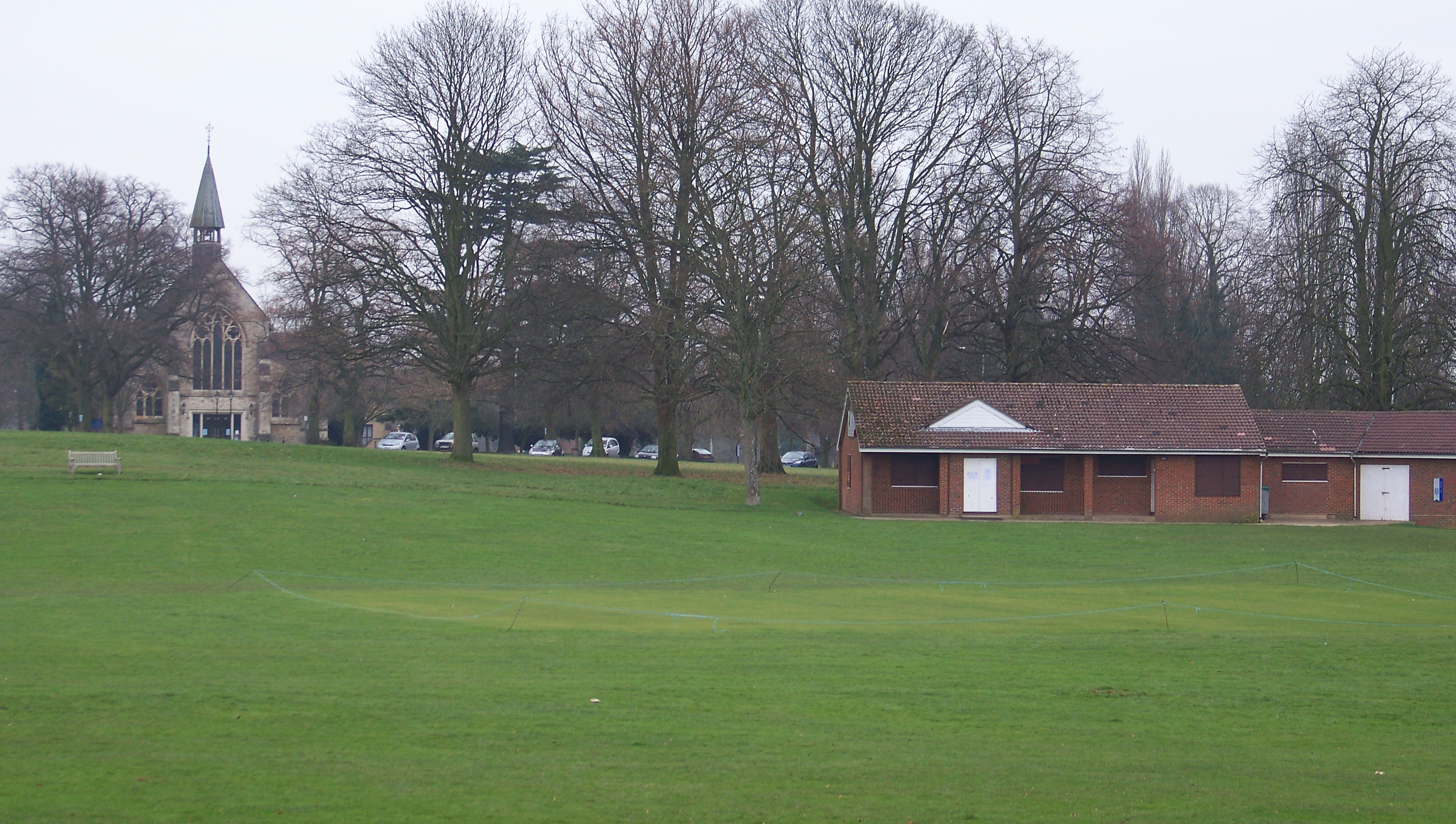
Boxmoor Cricket Club and St. John's Church

Box Lane Chapel, a Non-conformist chapel founded in 1668 on land owned by the Westbrook Hay estate, was re-built in 1690 and then altered in 1856 and again in 1876. Tradition has it that Oliver Cromwell once worshiped here at an earlier building on the site. It is now a private house after being sold in 1969.

There was a Primitive Methodist chapel at Crouchfield built in 1849, which was in the St Albans Circuit. This stood until the congregation moved to Bourne Chapel in Chaulden in 1959, which is now called Hemel Hempstead Methodist Church.

St John's Church was built, in 1874, on part of the Box Moor Trust land.

== Sport and entertainment ==
=== Boxmoor Cricket Club ===
Boxmoor Cricket Club was founded in 1857 when the Box Moor Trust let some of their land be used as a cricket pitch; it is known as the Boxmoor Oval, which had a pavilion added in the 1930s.

=== Hemel Hempstead Theatre Company ===
Originally known as the Hemel Hempstead Operatic and Dramatic Society, the Hemel Hempstead Theatre Company has operated since 1925. Over the years, the company performed in a number of locations, including the Luxor cinemas in the Marlowes and St. John’s Hall at 72 St. John's Road, which had been built in 1930 as extension of the nearby St. John’s Church. The first-ever theatrical performance at St. John’s Hall was given by the Theatre Company in April 1932.

Hemel Hempstead Theatre Company purchased the St. John's Hall building in 1997 and renamed it the Boxmoor Playhouse. Holding up to 200 seats, the Boxmoor Playhouse is said to be the largest theatre in Hemel Hempstead. Each year, the Company produces a variety of productions from plays to musicals to pantomimes. Due to the flexibility of the space, the Company also holds social events such as quiz nights, creative workshops and cabaret evenings.

== Notable people ==
Robert Snooks became, in 1802, the last highwayman to be hanged and buried at the scene of his crime, after he robbed a postboy on the turnpike on Boxmoor meadows. His remains are interred in Boxmoor meadows near the place where he was hanged, and the likely spot is marked by two stones, erected by the Box Moor Trust in 1904.

Rock musician and producer Steven Wilson spent his childhood in Boxmoor, and for many years maintained his No Man's Land studio in his former bedroom in his parents' bungalow.

British/Canadian actor Michael Bradshaw grew up in Boxmoor from 1938 until the mid-1950s.

Johnny Johnston of 1950s vocal group the Johnston Brothers lived in The Old House on Box Lane.
