= Robert Snooks =

English highwayman

- Born: James Snook; 16 August 1761; Hungerford, Berkshire, England
- Died: 11 May 1802 (aged 40); Boxmoor, Hemel Hempstead, Hertfordshire, England
- Resting place: Boxmoor, Hemel Hempstead, Hertfordshire, England
- Other names: James Blackman Snook, The "Robber" Snook
- Occupation: Highwayman
- Known for: The last highwayman to be hanged in England.

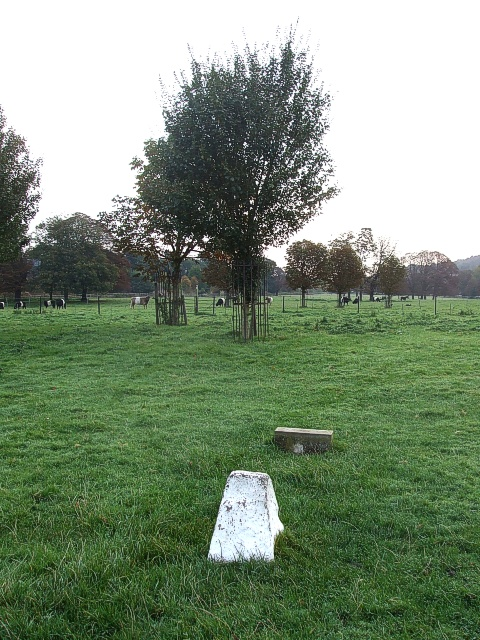
The grave of Robert Snooks, Boxmoor, Hertfordshire. This is the approximate resting spot of James Snook, and is marked by two stones. The headstone (foreground) was erected by the Boxmoor Trust in 1904, whilst the footstone was installed in 1994.

Robert Snooks was the last man to be executed in England for highway robbery, on 11 March 1802. Born in Hungerford in Berkshire, he was christened as James Snook on 16 August 1761. The fact that his name is commonly quoted as Robert Snooks is perhaps due to a corruption of his identity as the "Robber" Snook.

== The crime ==
On the evening of Sunday 10 May 1801 post boy John Stevens, travelling from Tring, a small town, to Hemel Hempstead, a market town, was entrusted with several mail bags of post. Upon reaching an isolated part of Boxmoor, near Bourne End, he was threatened by a highwayman who stole from him six leather bags containing bank notes, promissory notes and letters. The highwayman took the money, valued at £80, and discarded the unwanted letters and bags, leaving them strewn across the moor. It was revealed in the London Chronicle of 11 March 1802, that the highwayman had also discarded his saddle with a broken girth strap on the moor, a mistake that subsequently led to his identification.

== Investigation and trial ==
The day after the theft, Postmaster and High Constable John Page (of the Kings Arms in nearby Berkhamsted) initiated investigations into the crime. Several people came forward and stated they remembered seeing a man at the Kings Arms fixing a broken girth-strap on his saddle. It was believed that an ostler, later identified as James Snook, had worked at the Kings Arms and would thus have had some knowledge of the post boy's route.

Snook was already a wanted man, being connected to several highway robberies between Bath and Salisbury. He had also been indicted for horse-stealing at the Old Bailey in 1799, under what is assumed to be his full name of James Blackman Snooks. For this charge he was acquitted due to lack of firm evidence.

A reward of £200 was offered by the Postmaster General in addition to the £100 offered by Parliament for the apprehending of highwaymen. He was subsequently captured in Marlborough Forest on 8 December 1801, by William Salt, a post-boy who was driving a chaise through the forest. Salt recognised Snook, and managed to apprehend the thief with the help of his passengers. At this point, Snook had £200 in his pocket, as well as 'a brace of very handsome pistols'. John Stevens, was unable to positively identify Snook, as it was dark at the time of the robbery, as a result, there was only circumstantial evidence that linked Snook to the crime. This included one of the stolen bank notes being traced back to being in Snook's possession, when he accidentally gave it to a serving girl in Southwark whilst trying to purchase some cloth.

He was initially held in Newgate Prison, before being moved to Hertford Gaol on 4 March 1802 whilst awaiting trial. Five days later, the trial took place and he was found guilty. Whilst the typical punishment for highway robbery was transportation, due to Snook's crime being "of a nature so destructive to society and the commercial interests to the country", he was sentenced to be hanged.

== Punishment ==
Snook's punishment took place two days after his sentencing, on public ground nearest to the scene of the crime, as the law required. It is believed that thousands of people flocked to see the hanging, and it was to some of this number that Snook's is reputed to have exclaimed "It's no good hurrying - they can't start the fun until I get there!" whilst on his way to the gallows. Snook's body was dug up the day after his hanging, was interred in a coffin provided by the residents of Hemel Hempstead and unceremoniously re-interred on the moor.

A small headstone (bearing the name 'Robert Snooks') was erected by the Box Moor Trust in 1904, whilst a footstone was installed in 1994, as part of the Trust's 400 year anniversary. The exact location of Snook's hanging, and subsequent burial is unknown, so the location of the stones is an approximation.

== Legacy ==
A pub in the nearby Pavilion in Hemel Hempstead, since demolished, was named after Snooks and used the silhouette of a mounted highwayman as its sign. One of the local Explorer Scout units is also named after him. In addition to the gravestones, the Box Moor Trust has also named one of the moors 'Snook's Moor', whilst the Estate Managers house is appropriately named 'Snook's End'.

== In popular culture ==
Australian band Dead Head Redemption in 2025 recorded the song Fogman (The Last Highwayman), based on Snook's story. Lead singer The Reverend Philip Snook says they "adopted [their] stage name after the infamous highwayman."
