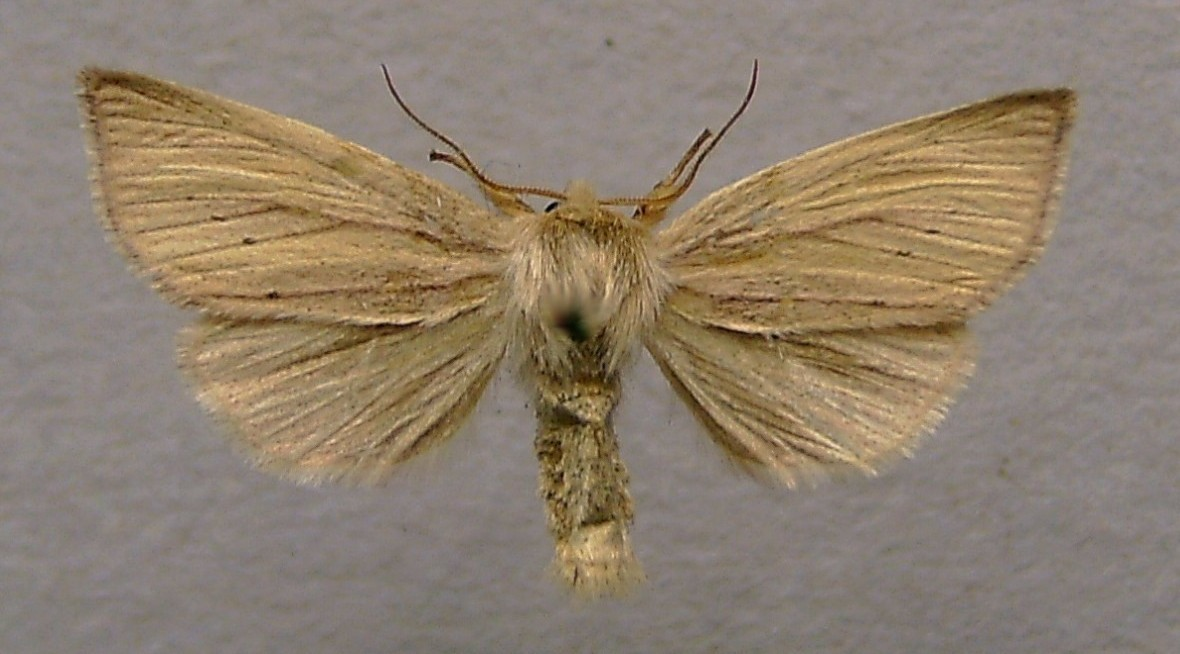
- Sedina buettneri

Scientific classification
- Domain: Eukaryota
- Kingdom: Animalia
- Phylum: Arthropoda
- Class: Insecta
- Order: Lepidoptera
- Superfamily: Noctuoidea
- Family: Noctuidae
- Genus: Sedina; Urbahn, 1933

= Sedina =

Genus of moths

Sedina is a genus of moths of the family Noctuidae.

- Sedina buettneri (Hering, 1858)
