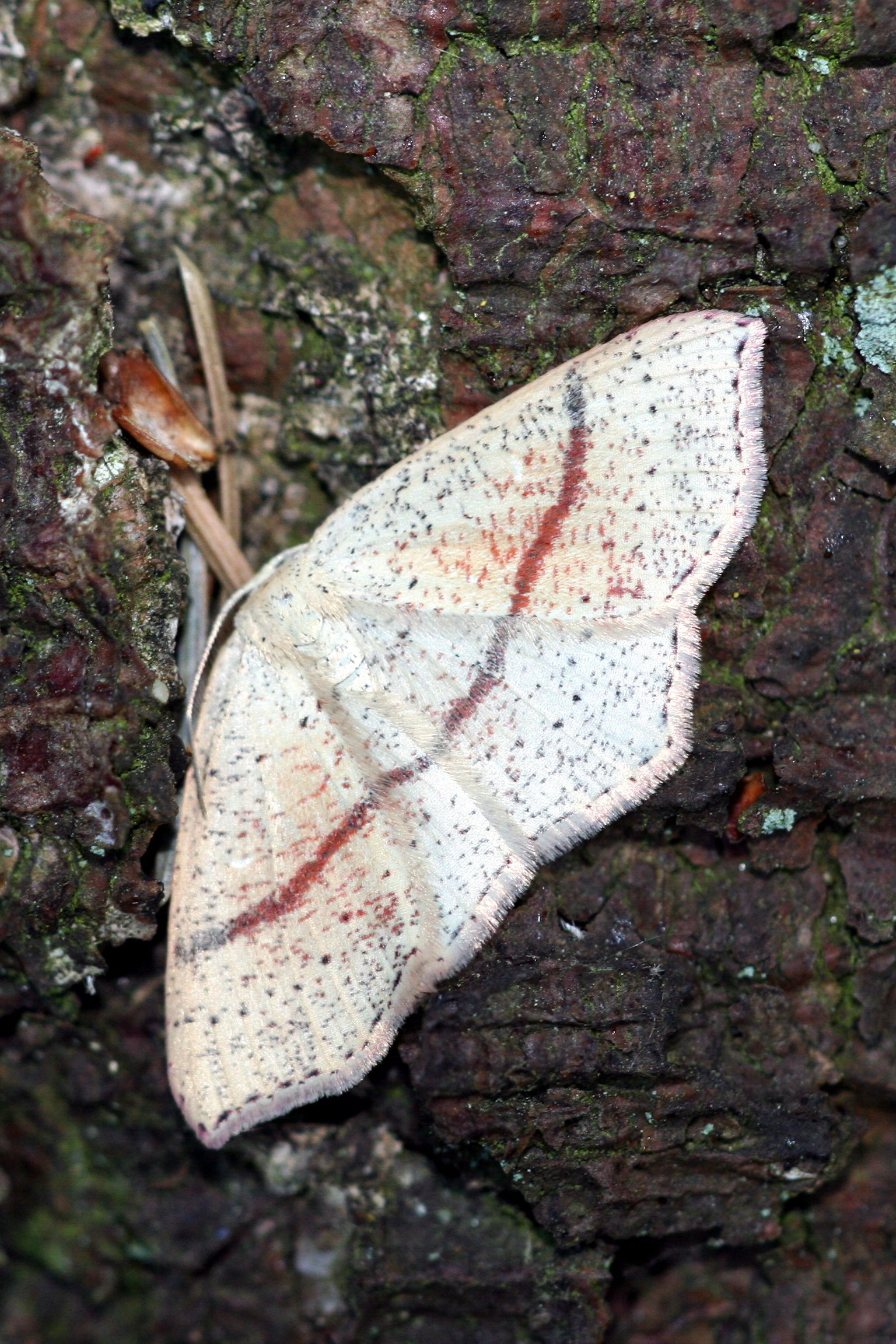

Scientific classification
- Kingdom: Animalia
- Phylum: Arthropoda
- Clade: Pancrustacea
- Class: Insecta
- Order: Lepidoptera
- Family: Geometridae
- Genus: Cyclophora
- Species: C. punctaria

Binomial name
- Cyclophora punctaria (Linnaeus, 1758)

Synonyms
- Phalaena punctaria Linnaeus, 1758; Geometra acutaria Roquette, 1857; Phalaena amata Linnaeus, 1758; Phalaena amataria Linnaeus, 1761; Phalaena communifasciata Donovan, 1808; Phalaena fultaria Villers, 1789; Zonosoma naevata Bastelberger, 1900; Ephyra radiomarginata de Joannis, 1908; Geometra subangularia Haworth, 1809; Phalaena teutonaria Linnaeus, 1758; Phalaena unifasciata Donovan, 1808; Cosymbia delaeveri Berger, 1949; Cyclophora delaeveri

= Cyclophora punctaria =

Species of moth

Cyclophora punctaria, the maiden's blush, is a moth of the family Geometridae. The species was first described by Carl Linnaeus in his 1758 10th edition of Systema Naturae. The species is mainly prevalent in Central and Eastern Europe. In the north, its distribution extends to southern Fennoscandia and the British Isles, in the west via France to parts of northern Spain, in the south via Italy, the Balkan Peninsula (with the exception of Greece) to Asia Minor. The eastern border of the distribution is roughly the Ural. In the Caucasus area, the nominate subspecies is replaced by the subspecies C. punctaria fritzae. The range of this subspecies extends as far as Iran.Cyclophora punctaria is found mainly in wooded areas with oak scrub and oak forests. In Central Europe it rises up to 700 metres in the hills, rarely up to 1,200 metres in the Alps, and regularly rises to 1,300 metres in southern Europe.

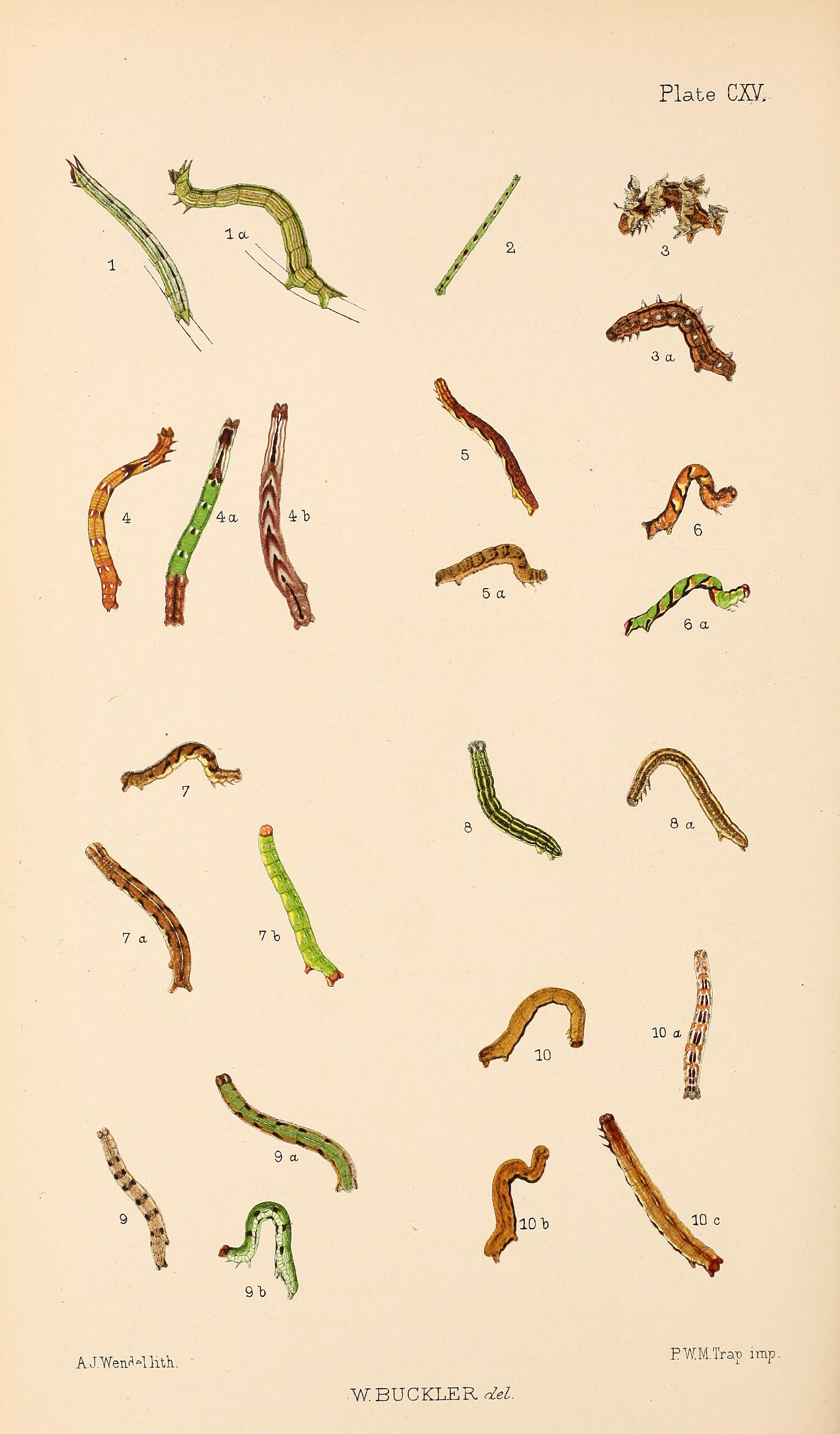
Fig 6, 6a Larvae after final moult

== Description ==
The wingspan is 13–25 mm for the first generation; the second generation is typically much smaller and reaches only about 22 mm. The forewings have a sand ground colour, or may have reddish or yellowish tints. The pattern is variable. The medium-sized, slightly curved and brown coloured cross line is always clearly marked. Basal to this there is strongly curved row of dots. Distally is a slightly curved row of dots. A further line dots is the margin. The fringes are the basic colour. The pattern elements continue on the hindwings. The discal marks are the base colour and therefore hardly visible. The larva is smooth and slim, very variable in colour, green, brown or grey. On the sides there are red and yellowish-white spots framed by yellow oblique lines, on the dorsum they have a variety of U-shaped black spots. The pupa, which is quite is yellowish-brown to greenish with four rows of large, dark back spots. At the cremaster sit six strong bristles.

== Biology ==
The moths fly in generations from May to June and in August in western Europe.

The larvae feed on oak leaves.

== Similar species ==
Cyclophora punctaria is difficult to certainly distinguish from these congeners. See Townsend et al.

- Blair's Mocha Cyclophora puppillaria (Herrich-Schäffer, 1855)
- False Mocha Cyclophora porata (Linnaeus, 1767)
- Jersey Mocha Cyclophora ruficiliaria (Linnaeus, 1758)
- Clay Triple-lines Cyclophora linearia (Hübner, 1799)
