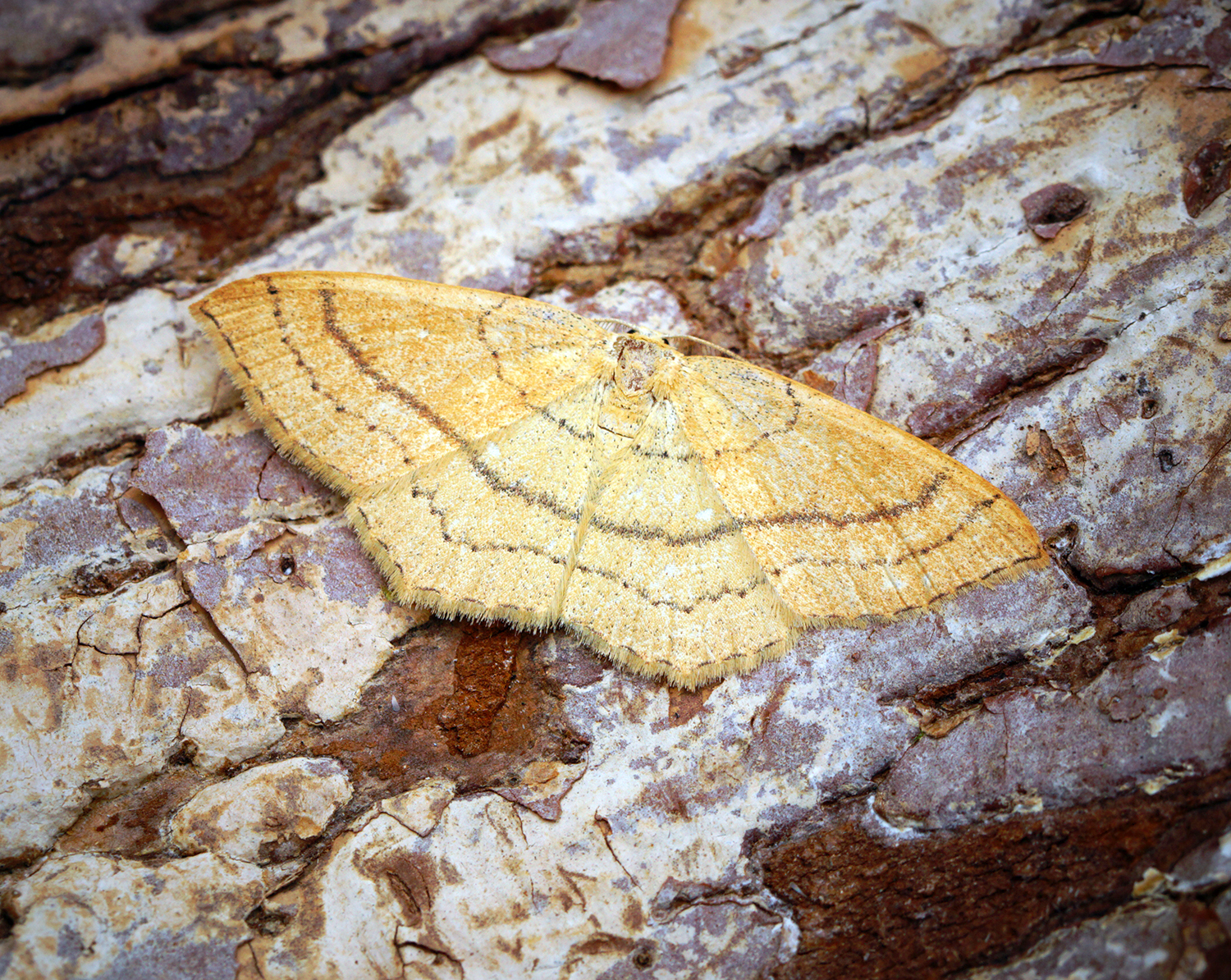

Scientific classification
- Kingdom: Animalia
- Phylum: Arthropoda
- Class: Insecta
- Order: Lepidoptera
- Family: Geometridae
- Genus: Cyclophora
- Species: C. linearia

Binomial name
- Cyclophora linearia (Hübner, 1799)

Synonyms
- Geometra linearia Hubner, 1799; Phalaena trilinearia Borkhausen, 1794; Phalaena luteolaria Villers, 1789; Ephyra strabonaria Zeller, 1851

= Cyclophora linearia =

Species of moth

Cyclophora linearia, the clay triple-lines, is a moth of the family Geometridae. The species was first described by Jacob Hübner in 1799 and it can be found in Europe and (primarily in the southern half) Britain.

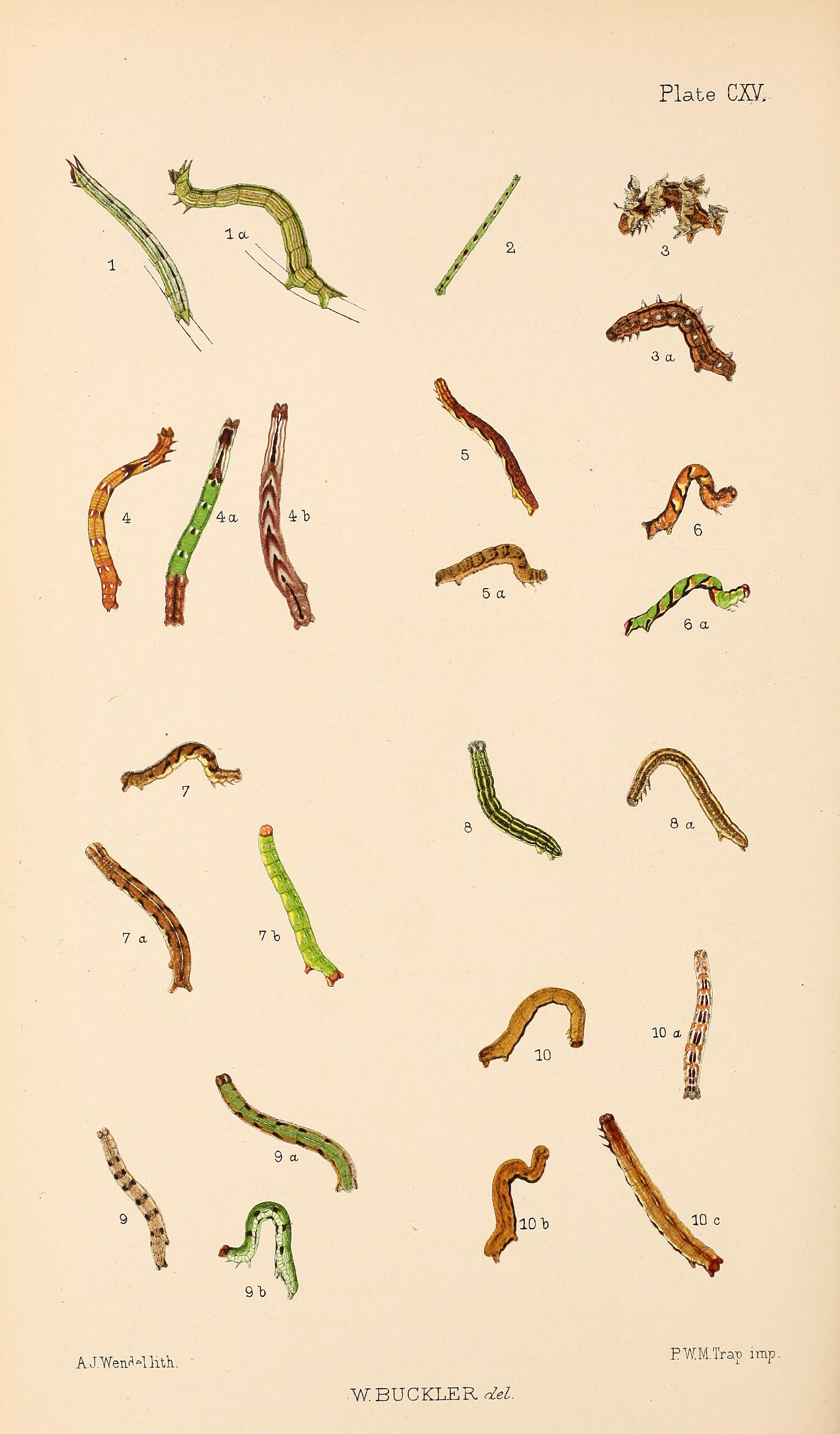
Figs. 7, 7a, 7b Larvae in various stages

== Description ==
The wingspan is 26–33 mm. The basic colour of the wings is pale brown to orange in the first generation and rose red in the second generation. On the forewing are three crosslines, black to reddish in colour, the middle is wider. The crosslines are often vague in the second generation. describes some aberrations. The egg is elongate-oval, with fine hexagonal or rather irregularly polygonal ribbing; pale yellow, becoming marked with red. The larva is slender and naked, pale green, with small, yellow spots on the dorsum.

== Biology ==
The moths fly from May to July depending on the location.

The larvae feed on beech.

== Similar species ==
Cyclophora linearia is difficult to certainly distinguish from these congeners. See Townsend et al.

- Blair's mocha Cyclophora puppillaria (Herrich-Schäffer, 1855)
- Jersey Mocha Cyclophora ruficiliaria (Herrich-Schäffer, 1855)
- Maiden’s Blush Cyclophora punctaria (Linnaeus, 1758)
- False mocha Cyclophora porata (Hübner, 1799)
