= St John's Church, Boxmoor =

Coordinates: 51°44′40″N 0°28′44″W

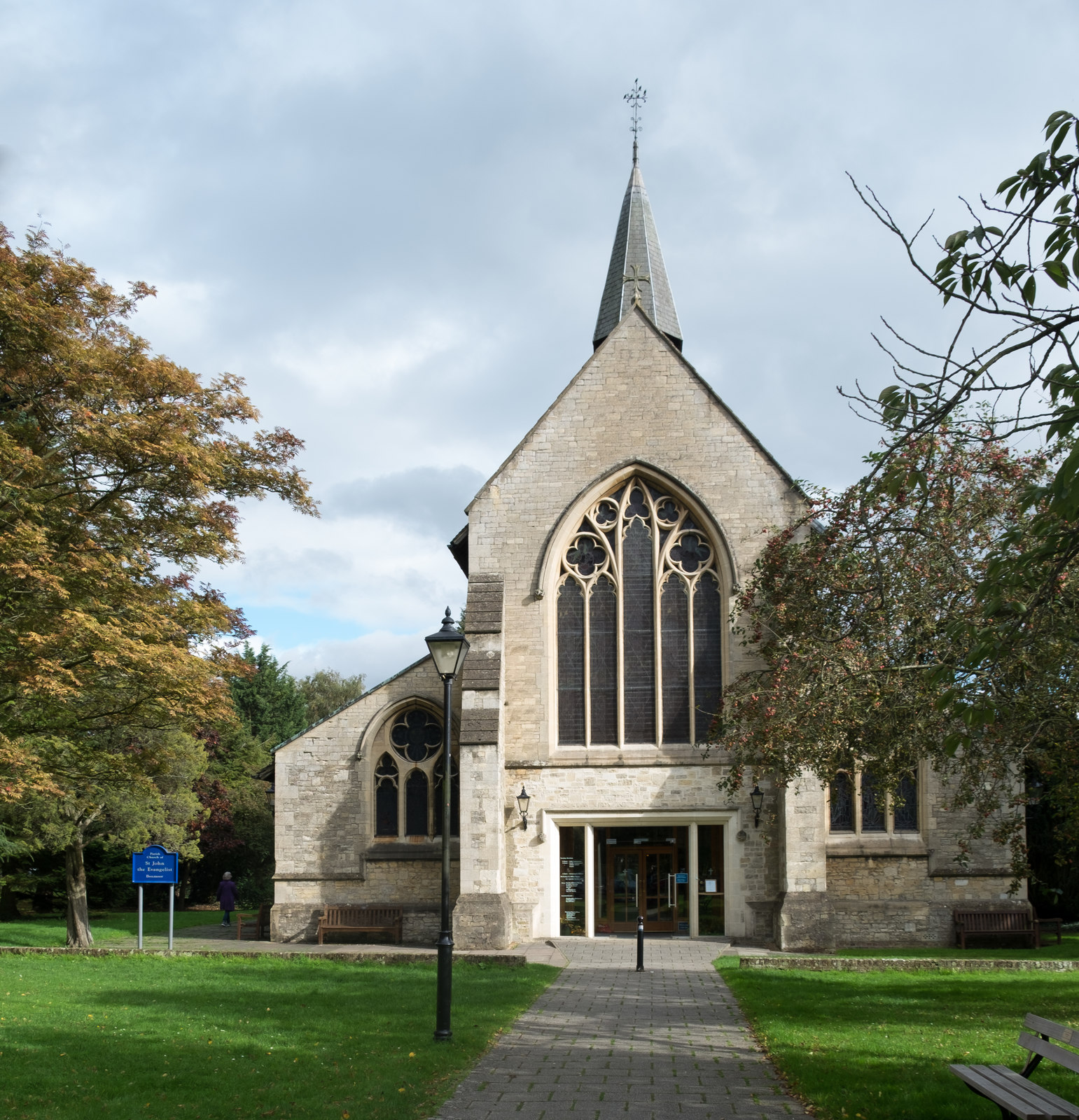
- St John's Church viewed from the west

- Shown within Hertfordshire
- OS grid reference: TL 05132 06182
- Location: Hemel Hempstead, Hertfordshire
- Country: England
- Denomination: Church of England
- Website: www.stjohnsboxmoor.co.uk

History
- Dedication: St. John

Architecture
- Heritage designation: Grade II listed
- Architect: Norman Shaw
- Style: Gothic Revival
- Years built: 1874

Administration
- Province: Canterbury
- Diocese: St Albans
- Archdeaconry: St Albans
- Deanery: Hemel Hempstead
- Parish: Boxmoor

Clergy
- Vicar: Michael Macey

The Church of St John the Evangelist is a Grade II listed church in Boxmoor, Hertfordshire, England. The church was consecrated in 1874 on land purchased from the Box Moor Trust.

== Design ==
St John's was designed by Norman Shaw in the Gothic Revival style. The church is made up of snecked rubble stone and features ashlar dressings and a plain tiled roof. An octagonal bellcote can be seen above the nave. Lancet arches run the length of the nave and clerestory, whilst internally the nave arcade is carried on piers of quatrefoil tracery. Tracery can also be found in the five-light window on the south face of the church, whilst another five-light window can be found on the east face.

The church hall is similarly styled in ashlar dressings, which have been diagonally tooled, and features two bays of three-light mullioned windows.

== History ==
The first Church of St John at Boxmoor was founded in 1830, and was chapel of ease to the then parish church of St Mary's in the old town of Hemel Hempstead. An application for the construction of this chapel was sent to the trustees of the Box Moor Trust in November, 1828. In September of the following year, the land was sold for the sum of £71; the chapel was duly erected, and inaugurated in May 1830. The need for a new Church of England place of worship was precipitated by the influx of Anglicans to the southern edges of Hemel Hempstead following the construction of the railway from London.

The Parish of Boxmoor was created in 1844, and has since grown to include three places of worship. St John's acts as the parish church, with St Stephen's in Chaulden and the Italianate style St Francis’ in Boxmoor also serving the parishioners.

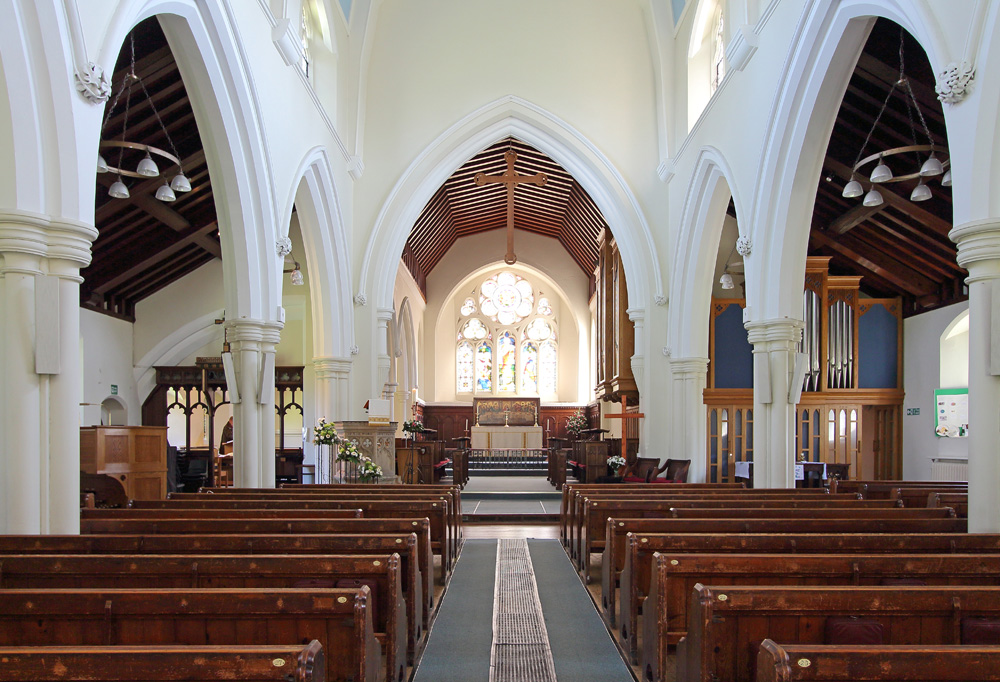
The interior of St John's Church. Some of the organ pipes can be seen on the right-hand side

A request was made by Revd A.C. Richings in 1865 to the Box Moor Trust enquiring if it would be possible to build on Roughdown Common, a proposal which never came to pass. This was followed up by an application to build a new church, the chapel's congregation having outgrown the building. This was granted, and contractor workshops were erected on the neighbouring moor in January 1873. The church was designed by noted architect Norman Shaw, and cost £4,400 to complete. Further additions would be made to St John's; the church hall was added in 1881, while in 1893 the church itself was enlarged, bringing the capacity up to 850. St John's was officially designated as a Grade II listed building in February, 1977.

In July 2002, the church hall was replaced by a new hall, which is used as a meeting space.

St John's Church features a Nicholson & Co Ltd pipe organ, which was installed at a cost of £400,000 in 2011. The previous organ, designed by Lindsay Garrard of Lechlade, had been in situ since 1906, and had been reconstructed by Foskett & Co in 1936. In 1969, Alfred E Davies & Son Ltd of Northampton had refurbished it. However, the building works carried out in 2002 for the church hall had further aggravated the already unreliable old instrument, and a new instrument was installed.

== Interior ==
There are nine stained or painted glass windows dating from the nineteenth and twentieth centuries and one window of dalle-de-verre. A painting of The Last Supper behind the altar is from 1908. There is a large modern brass on the south wall of the nave commemorating the family of lawyer Edward Mitchell-Innes whose house, known as 'Churchill', once stood to the north of the church.

== See also ==
- Box Moor Trust
