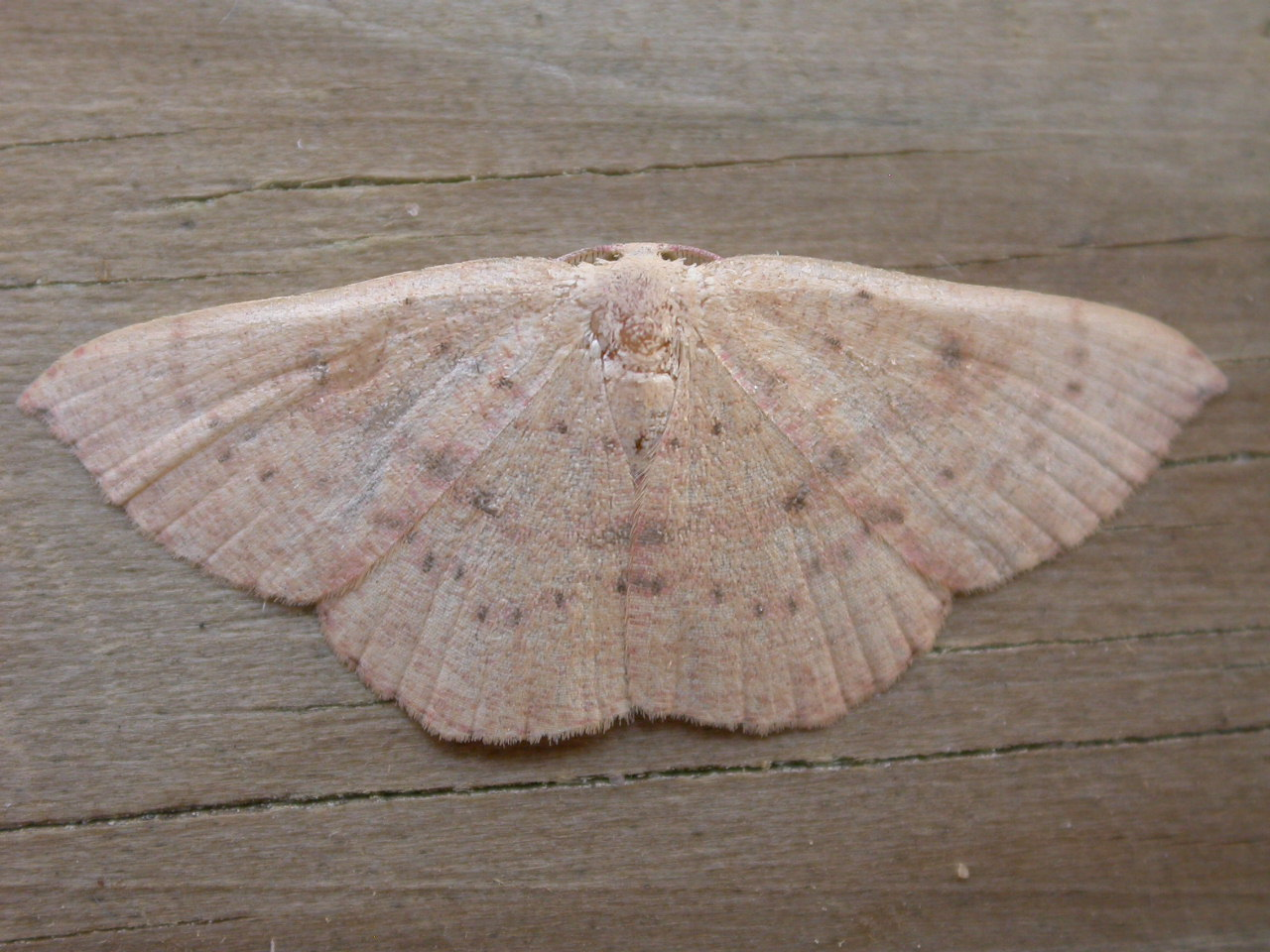

Scientific classification
- Kingdom: Animalia
- Phylum: Arthropoda
- Clade: Pancrustacea
- Class: Insecta
- Order: Lepidoptera
- Family: Geometridae
- Genus: Cyclophora
- Species: C. puppillaria

Binomial name
- Cyclophora puppillaria (Hübner, 1799)

Synonyms
- List: Geometra puppillaria Hubner, 1799; Cosymbia asiaeminoris Amsel, 1935; Ephyra calaritana Turati, 1911; Aspilates mirtalis Costa, 1834; Geometra nolaria Hubner, 1809; Zonosoma pupilarium Reutti, 1898; Cosymbia granti Prout, 1935; Cosymbia lilacinipes Schaus & Cockerell, 1923; Geometra gyrata Hübner, [1813]; Cabera gyraria Treitschke, 1827; Cyclophora gyraria

= Cyclophora puppillaria =

Blair's mocha

Species of moth

Cyclophora puppillaria, or Blair's mocha, is a moth of the family Geometridae. The species was first described by Jacob Hübner in 1799. It can be found in Europe and from North Africa up to the Caucasus area.

== Description ==
The wingspan is 28–36 mm in the first generation; the second and any subsequent generations are on average much smaller often only 19 mm. Front and hindwings have almost the same colour. This is however very variable and ranges usually from reddish brown to reddish yellow and light brown. Some specimens are sand coloured, brown or orange. Also, the pattern is very variable. The inner and outer cross lines, as well as the median band can be very well developed, but also almost completely missing. The interior cross line, but especially the outer cross line is often replaced by a row of dots. The discal spots on the front and rear wings can be large, small or completely absent. In specimens with large discal spots, these are often with white pupils. The front wing margin stains present on the hindwings, but mostly absent. The basal half of the costa is often dark. Where the inner and outer cross line reach the costal of the forewings, noticeable spots are usually developed. The fringes usually have the colour of the wings. The subspecies lilacinipes of Madeira has a dark fringe.

The moths fly from June to October depending on the location.

The larvae feed on oak.

=== Subspecies ===
- Cyclophora puppillaria puppillaria
- Cyclophora puppillaria granti (Prout, 1935)
- Cyclophora puppillaria lilacinipes (Schaus & Cockerell, 1923)

== Distribution ==
The species is widespread in the Mediterranean region. The occurrence ranges from the Iberian Peninsula and Morocco in the west to Greece, Asia minor and Egypt in the east. It occurs on all major islands of the Mediterranean. The occurrence continues to the Crimea and the Caucasus area to Iran and possibly Afghanistan. In France, it occurs in southern France and on the Atlantic coast to south of Brittany. Further east, the northernmost permanent presence is found in Hungary are found. The species is migratory and is therefore in the summer north of the Alps to southern England, Denmark, southern Sweden and southern Finland.

The populations on Madeira and the Azores are C. p. lilacinipes on Madeira and C. p. granti on the Azores.

== Similar species ==
Cyclophora puppillaria is difficult to certainly distinguish from these congeners. See Townsend et al.

- Jersey mocha Cyclophora ruficiliaria (Herrich-Schäffer, 1855)
- False mocha Cyclophora porata (Linnaeus, 1767)
- Maiden's blush Cyclophora punctaria (Linnaeus, 1758)
- Clay triple-lines Cyclophora linearia (Hübner, 1799)
