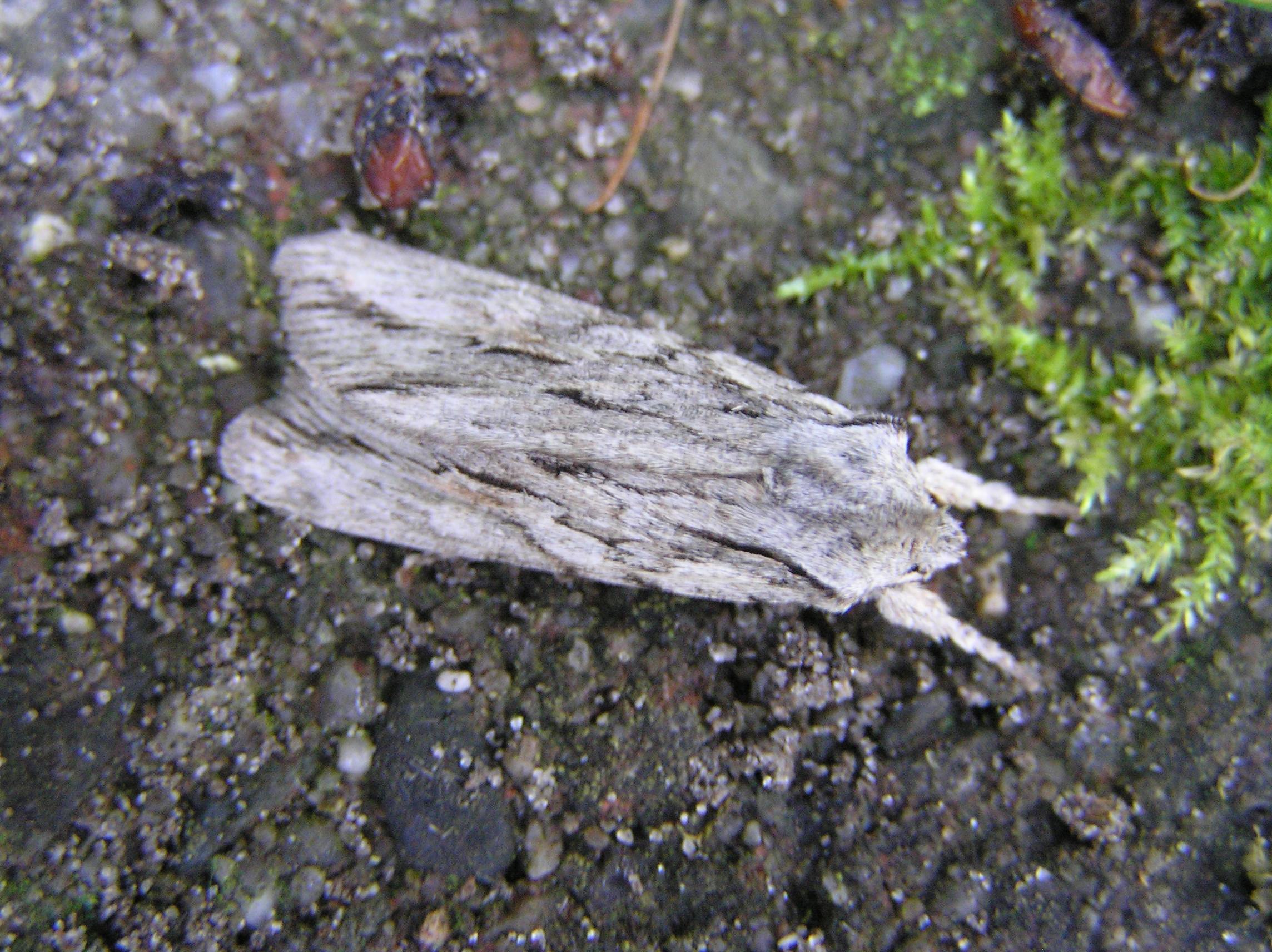

Scientific classification
- Domain: Eukaryota
- Kingdom: Animalia
- Phylum: Arthropoda
- Class: Insecta
- Order: Lepidoptera
- Superfamily: Noctuoidea
- Family: Noctuidae
- Genus: Lithophane
- Species: L. leautieri

Binomial name
- Lithophane leautieri (Boisduval, 1829)

= Lithophane leautieri =

Blair's shoulder-knot

Species of moth

Lithophane leautieri, the Blair's shoulder-knot, is a moth of the family Noctuidae. It is found in Europe. It originated from the area surrounding the Mediterranean Sea, but gradually moved north.

== Technical description and variation ==
The wingspan is 39–44 mm. Forewing pale grey, dusted with olive grey; lines strongly dentate, but much obscured, marked by short oblique costal streaks; upper stigmata ill-defined, but united at their base by a long black line; the reniform with fulvous in lower half; claviform elongate, black-edged, united by a short black streak with outer line; a well-marked black streak from base on submedian fold; submarginal line indicated only by black dentate marks preceding it, of which the two on the folds are longest; fringe mottled dark and light grey; hindwing pale brownish grey, darker towards termen; ab. sabinae Geyer is rather smaller, blue-grey, more distinctly marked, especially the median shade and submarginal teeth; reniform stigma with hardly any fulvous in it; the two black lines on submedian fold hardly visible.

== Subspecies ==
- Lithophane leautieri sabinae (Geyer, 1832), Valais, Switzerland
- Lithophane leautieri nicaeenis Boursin, 1957, south Germany
- Lithophane leautieri cyrnos Boursin, 1957, Corsiaa und Sardinia
- Lithophane leautieri hesperica Boursin, 1957 Spain, Hetherlands and British Isles
- Lithophane leautieri andalusica Boursin, 1962, Sierra Nevada
- leautieri ochreimacula (Rothschild, 1914), Maghreb

== Biology ==
The moth flies from September to mid-November.

The larva is dark green, dorsal and subdorsal lines white, segmentally swollen and partially interrupted; spiracular line yellowish white. The larvae feed on various cypress species.

The species primarily inhabits xerophilic cypress and juniper areas and can also be found in gardens and parks. The altitude distribution ranges from sea level to 1800 metres.

== Notes ==
1. The flight season refers to Belgium and The Netherlands. This may vary in other parts of the range.
