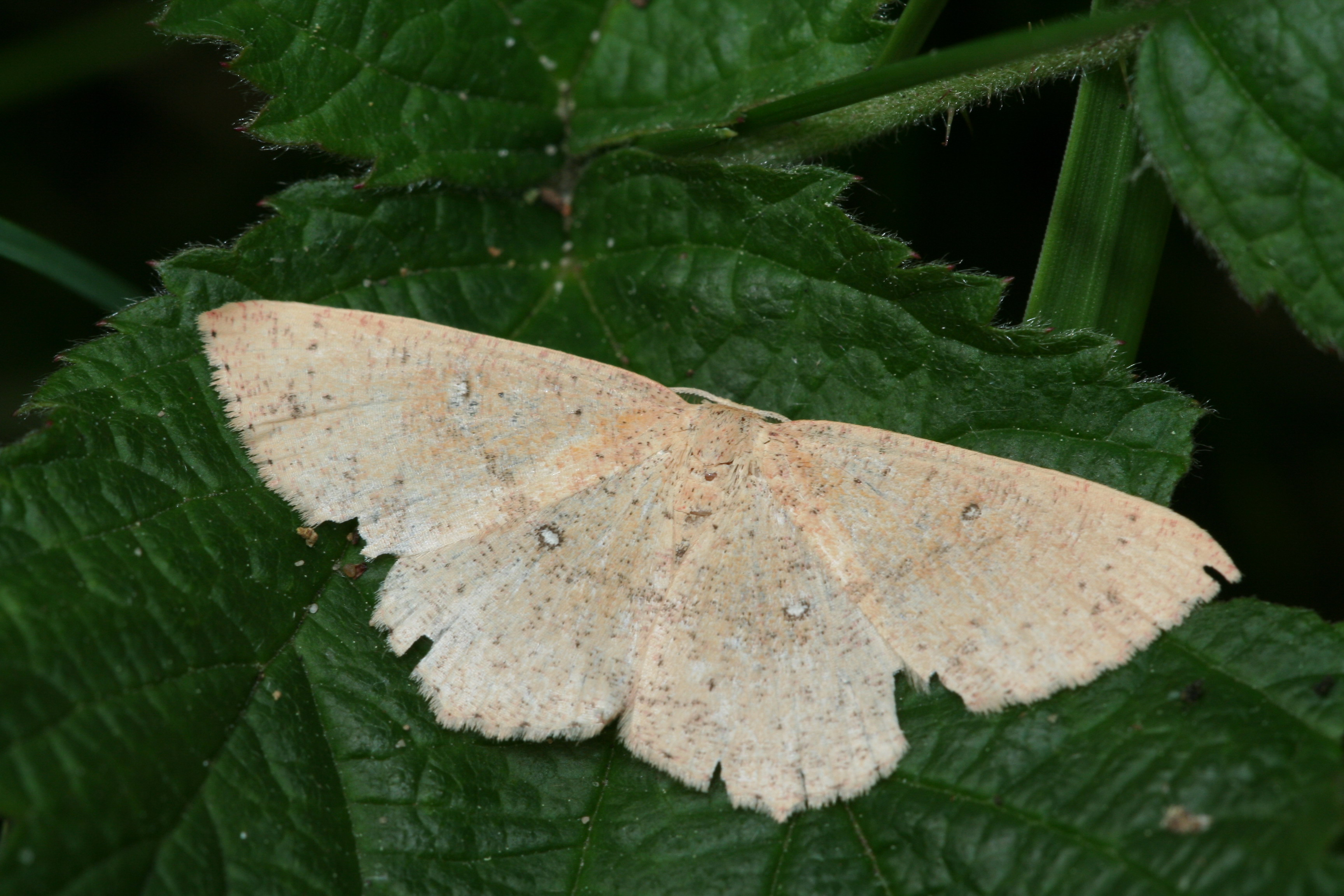

Scientific classification
- Kingdom: Animalia
- Phylum: Arthropoda
- Clade: Pancrustacea
- Class: Insecta
- Order: Lepidoptera
- Family: Geometridae
- Genus: Cyclophora
- Species: C. porata

Binomial name
- Cyclophora porata (Linnaeus, 1767)

Synonyms
- Phalaena porata Linnaeus, 1767; Geometra hubneraria Haworth, 1802; Phalaena poraria Latreille, 1825

= Cyclophora porata =

Species of moth

Cyclophora porata, the false mocha, is a moth of the family Geometridae. The species can be found in southern Europe and England to Denmark, southern Sweden and the Caucasus.

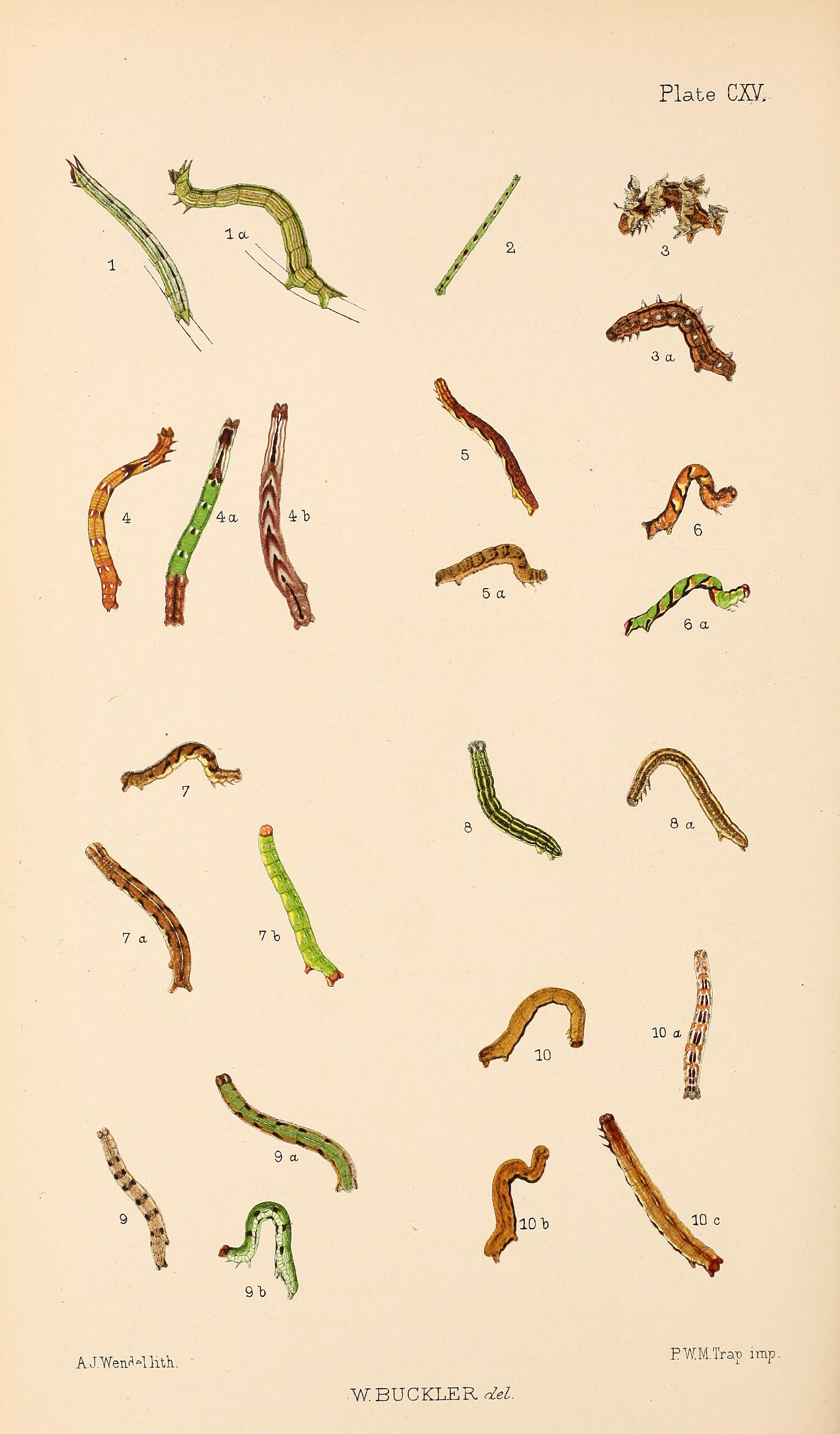
Figs 5, 5a Larvae after final moult

== Description ==
The wingspan is 25–30 millimetres (0.98–1.18 in). The fore wings are reddish, warm orange-brown, but the hind wings are clearly lighter in tone. The wings are covered with abundant grey scales, and both the front and hind wings have a clear centre spot consisting of a dark ring with a white centre. The grey scales give the wings a shining impression. The inner and outer cross-lines are broken into a row of separate black dots. The middle crossband is greyish and blends with the background colour of the wing without a clear boundary.

== Biology ==
The moths fly in generations from May to June and from August to September in western Europe. The caterpillars can be green or brownish yellow, and feed on oak and birch.

== Similar species ==
Cyclophora porata is difficult to certainly distinguish from these congeners See Townsend et al.

- Blair's Mocha Cyclophora puppillaria (Herrich-Schäffer, 1855)
- Jersey Mocha Cyclophora ruficiliaria
- Maiden’s Blush Cyclophora punctaria (Linnaeus, 1758)
- Clay Triple-lines Cyclophora linearia (Hübner, 1799)
