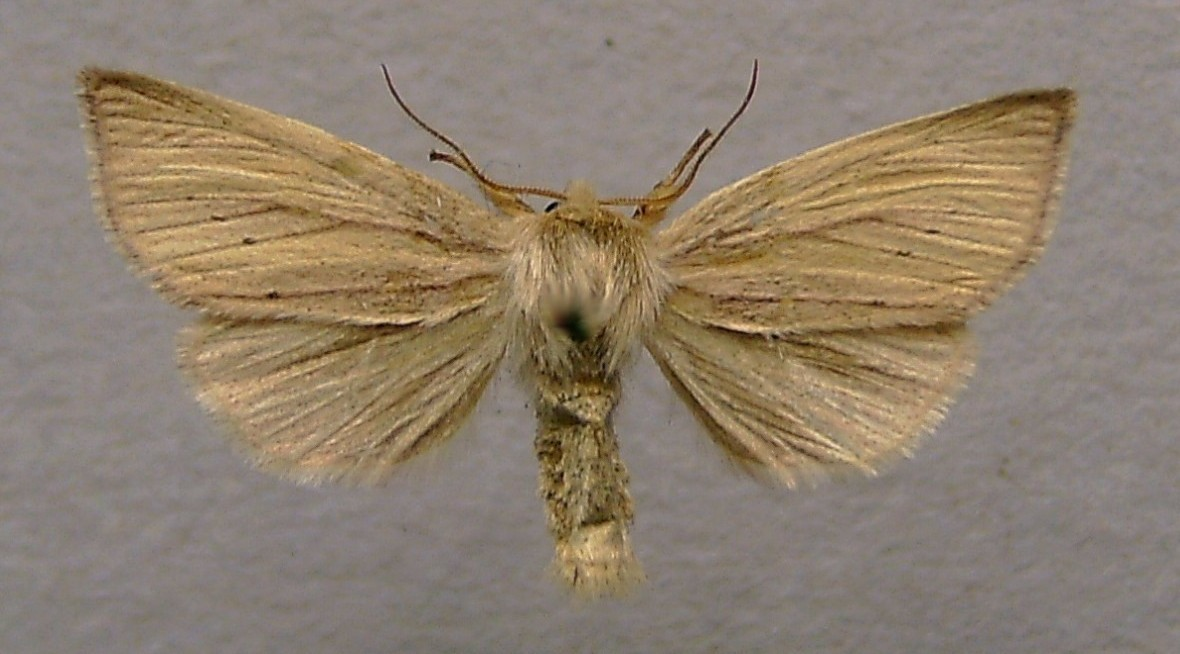

Scientific classification
- Kingdom: Animalia
- Phylum: Arthropoda
- Class: Insecta
- Order: Lepidoptera
- Superfamily: Noctuoidea
- Family: Noctuidae
- Genus: Sedina
- Species: S. buettneri

Binomial name
- Sedina buettneri (Hering, 1858)

Synonyms
- Arsilonche buettneri; Nonagria bloomeri; Simyra moltrechti; Archanara pumilana

= Sedina buettneri =

Species of moth

Sedina buettneri, or Blair's wainscot, is a moth of the family Noctuidae. The species was first described by Eduard von Hering in 1858. It is found in the Palearctic realm. Outside of Europe, it is occasionally found in temperate Asia, the coast of the Black Sea, the base of the Caucasus mountains, the Caspian Sea, Iran, Russia east to the Urals, Lake Baikal and Altai regions, and in Japan and the Kuril Islands.

== Technical description and variation ==
Forewing straw-colour, the veins rufous, the intervals with grey streaks; hindwing grey, with rufous veins. The wingspan is 20–35 mm.

== Biology ==
The moth flies from August to October in one generation depending on the location.

The larvae feed on Carex acutiformis and Glyceria species.
