= Roughdown Common =

Protected area in Hertfordshire, England

Coordinates: 51.7402°N 0.4850°W

- Site of Special Scientific Interest
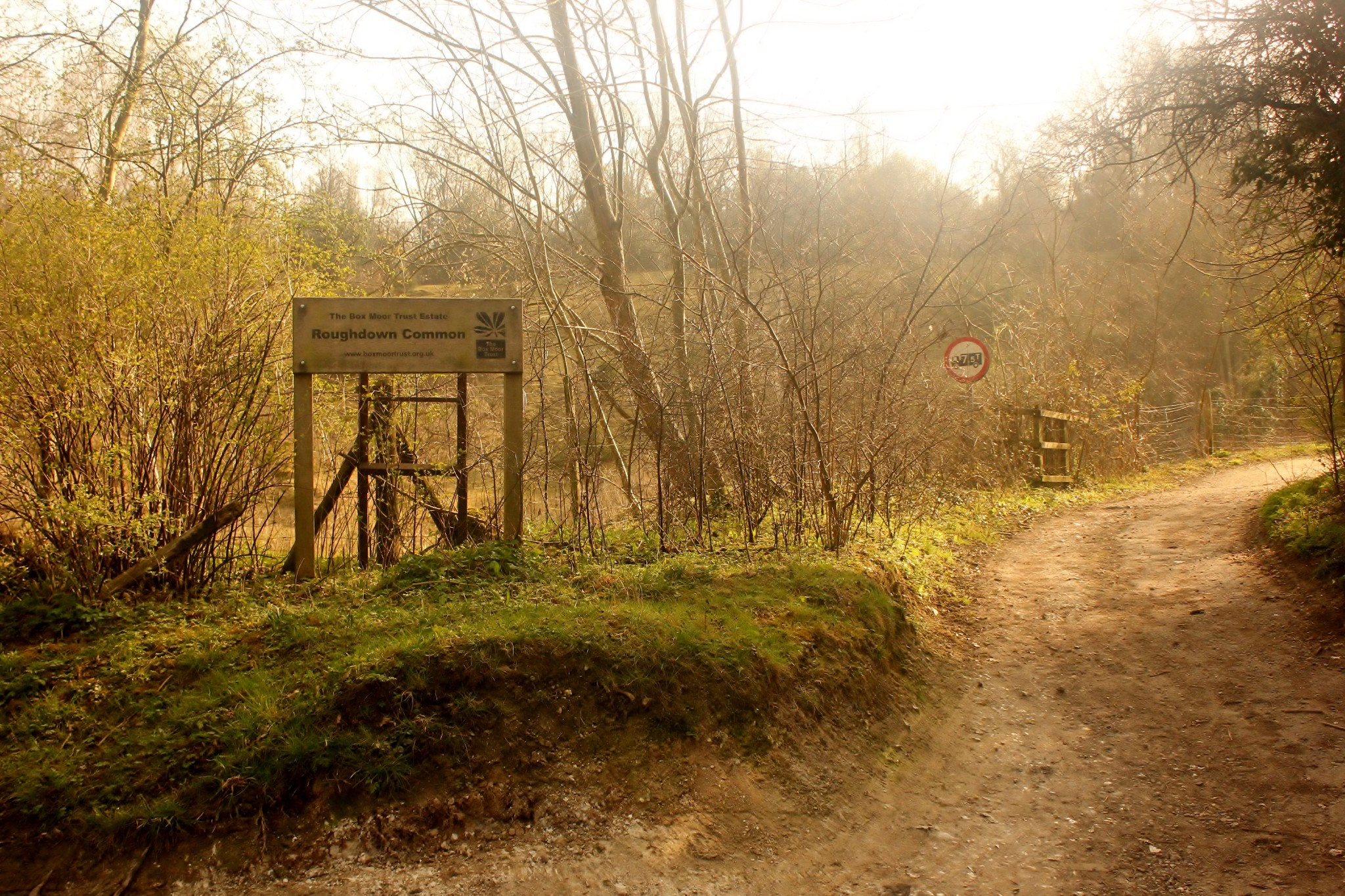
- Sign at the entrance to Roughdown Common nature reserve, Hemel Hempstead, UK.
- Location of Roughdown Common.
- Area of search: Hertfordshire
- Grid reference: TL047057
- Interest: Biological
- Area: 3.6 ha (8.9 acres)
- Notification date: 1985
- Location map: Magic Map

Roughdown Common is a 3.6-hectare (8.9-acre) biological Site of Special Scientific Interest in Hemel Hempstead in Hertfordshire. The planning authority is Dacorum Borough Council. The site is Common land, and it is owned by the Box Moor Trust having been officially bought by the trust in April 1886 from the Dean and Chapter of St Paul's. It is part of the Chilterns Area of Outstanding Natural Beauty. The Common is a steeply sloping chalk hill in south Hemel Hempstead.

== History ==
It was formerly the site of a large chalk quarry featuring a pillar and stall mine, an entrance to which still exists, however, it is sealed off for human entry.

During the construction of the Grand Union Canal where it flows through Boxmoor, the navvies who carried out the work lived on an encampment at Roughdown Common. The navvies where not the only group that made use of the Common; in 1809 a Good Friday funfair was held in the chalk pit, while 1939 saw the first recorded football match on the site, played by young evacuees from London. The war theme continued in 1946 when prisoners of war - who were based in a P.O.W. camp at nearby Howes Retreat - cleared scrub at the site.

== Present day ==
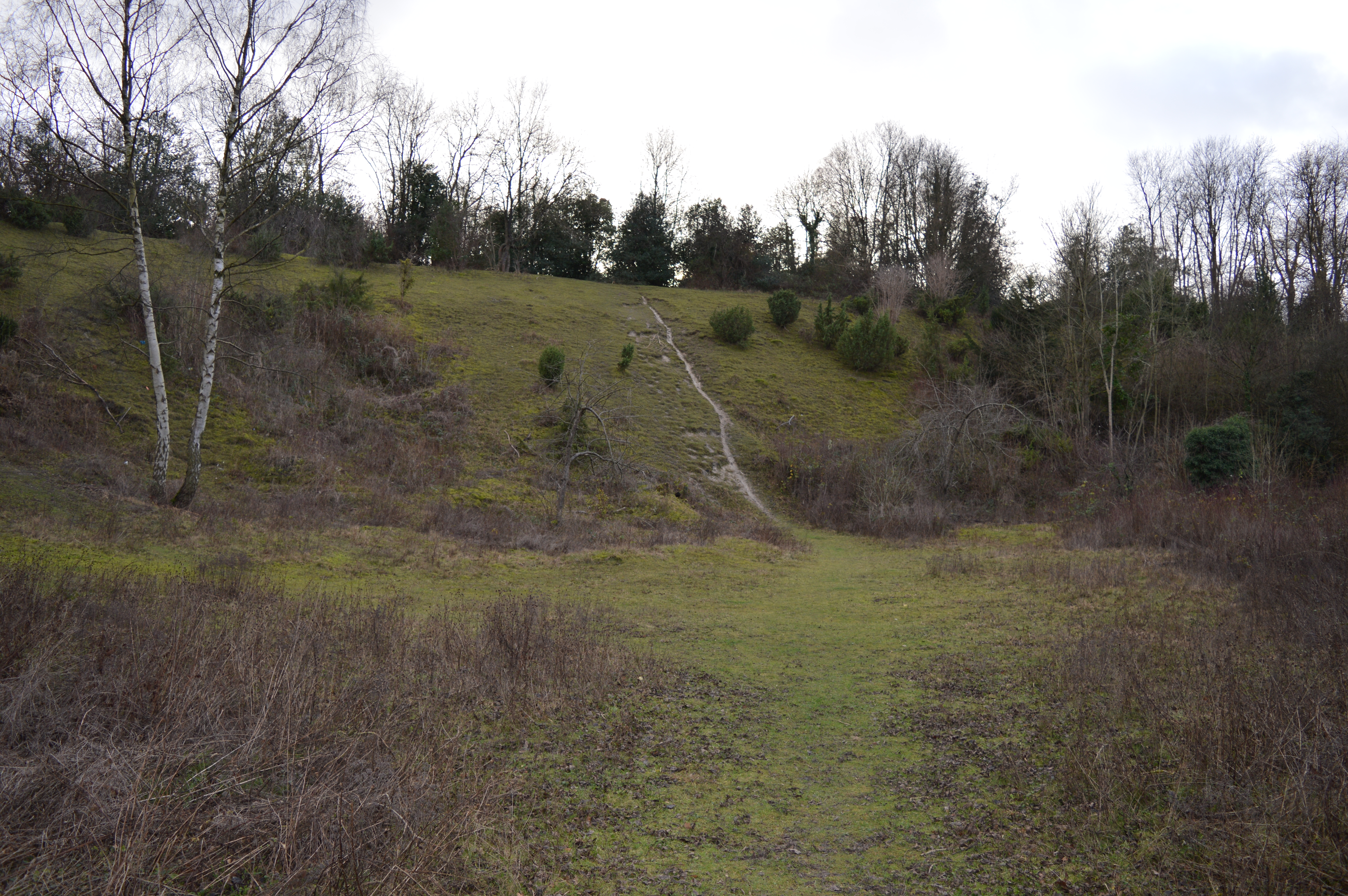
Roughdown Common, the old chalk quarry

It is one of the few examples of unimproved calcareous grassland in Hertfordshire. The dominant grasses are meadow fescue and meadow oat-grass, and other flora includes colonies of orchids, including Common Spotted, Fly and Pyramid varieties, as well as common juniper. Roughdown Common is the only known site in Hertfordshire in which Juniper regenerates naturally.

The grassland habitat is maintained by sheep grazing. In September, 2016 the first recorded sighting of the Jersey Mocha moth in the county occurred on the Common.

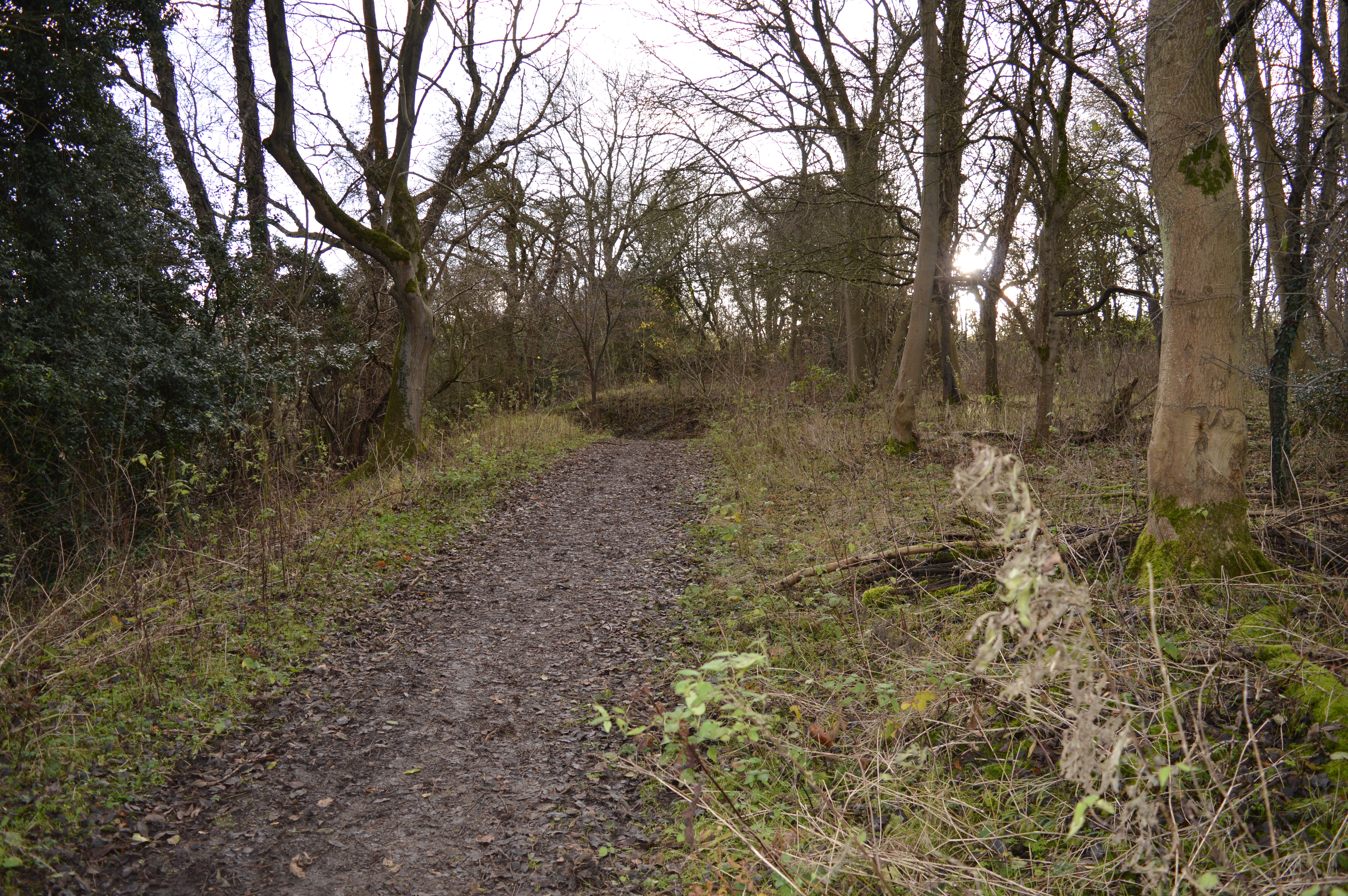
A wooded part of the common in winter

The entrance points to the mine were sealed to human access in 1994, and the site instead became a bat hibernaculum, and is the home of a small colony of Brown long-eared bats.

The site is always open and there is access from footpaths starting at the junction of Roughdown Road and Roughdown Avenue. An explanatory panel, placed by the Box Moor Trust, stands by the quarry entrance near the Roughdown Avenue railway bridge.

Starting in September 2017, the Box Moor Trust, working in conjunction with Natural England will begin felling self-seeded trees and clearing scrub at the site in order to encourage the reestablishment of calcareous species originally found there.

In October 2019, Juniper picked on Roughdown Common was used by Puddingstone Distillery to create a gin. The distillery had teamed up with the Box Moor Trust and released the beverage in order to celebrate the Trust's 425th Anniversary. It was the first gin to be made in Hertfordshire using natural Juniper.

== See also ==
- List of Sites of Special Scientific Interest in Hertfordshire
- Box Moor Trust
