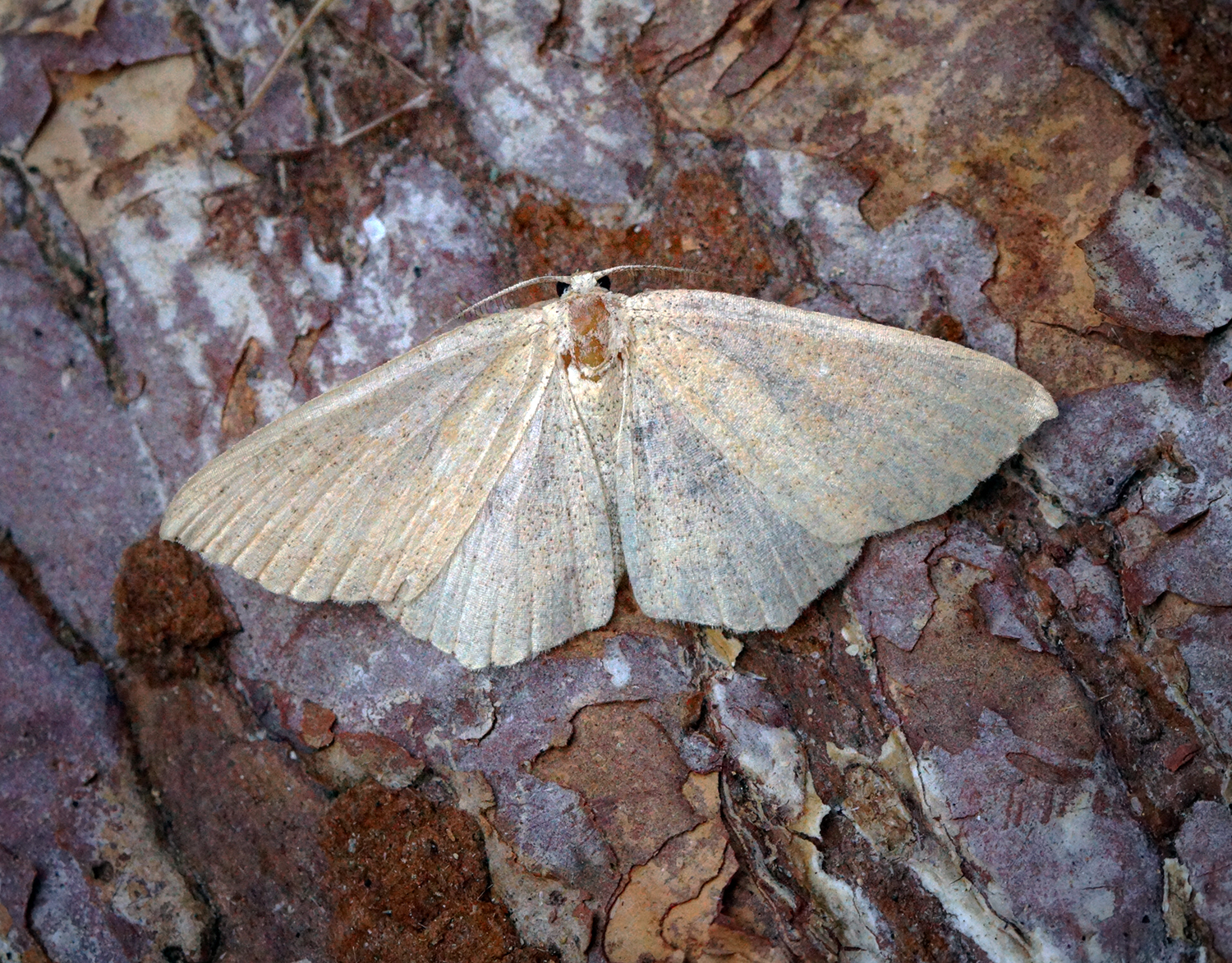

Scientific classification
- Kingdom: Animalia
- Phylum: Arthropoda
- Clade: Pancrustacea
- Class: Insecta
- Order: Lepidoptera
- Family: Geometridae
- Genus: Cyclophora
- Species: C. ruficiliaria

Binomial name
- Cyclophora ruficiliaria (Herrich-Schäffer, 1855)

Synonyms
- Zonosoma ruficiliaria Herrich-Schaffer, 1855; Phalaena unilinearia Scharfenberg, 1805

= Cyclophora ruficiliaria =

Species of moth

Cyclophora ruficiliaria, the Jersey mocha, is a moth of the family Geometridae. The species was first described by Gottlieb August Wilhelm Herrich-Schäffer in 1855. It can be found in Europe, in particular the Channel Islands as well as other parts of the mainland United Kingdom.

The first ever recorded sighting of the Jersey mocha on the British mainland was in July 2003 at Isle of Portland, Dorset. Subsequently, the butterfly has been found again in Dorset, and has set up a small breeding colony in south-west Cornwall. The first recorded sighting of the moth in Hertfordshire occurred in September 2016, on Roughdown Common.

== Description ==
The wingspan is 25–30 mm. It is a plain pale brown moth with faint crosslines and unringed white discal spots (sometimes obsolete) on the fore and hindwings. Certain identification requires examination of preparations of the genitalia. See similar species (below).

== Biology ==
The moths fly from April to September depending on the location.

The larvae feed on oak.

== Similar species ==
Cyclophora ruficiliaria is difficult to certainly distinguish from these congeners. See Townsend et al.

- Blair's mocha Cyclophora puppillaria (Herrich-Schäffer, 1855)
- False Mocha Cyclophora porata (Linnaeus, 1767)
- Maiden’s Blush Cyclophora punctaria (Linnaeus, 1758)
- Clay Triple-lines Cyclophora linearia (Hübner, 1799)
