= Apsley, Hertfordshire =

Village in Hertfordshire, England

Coordinates: 51.7378°N 0.4697°W

Apsley
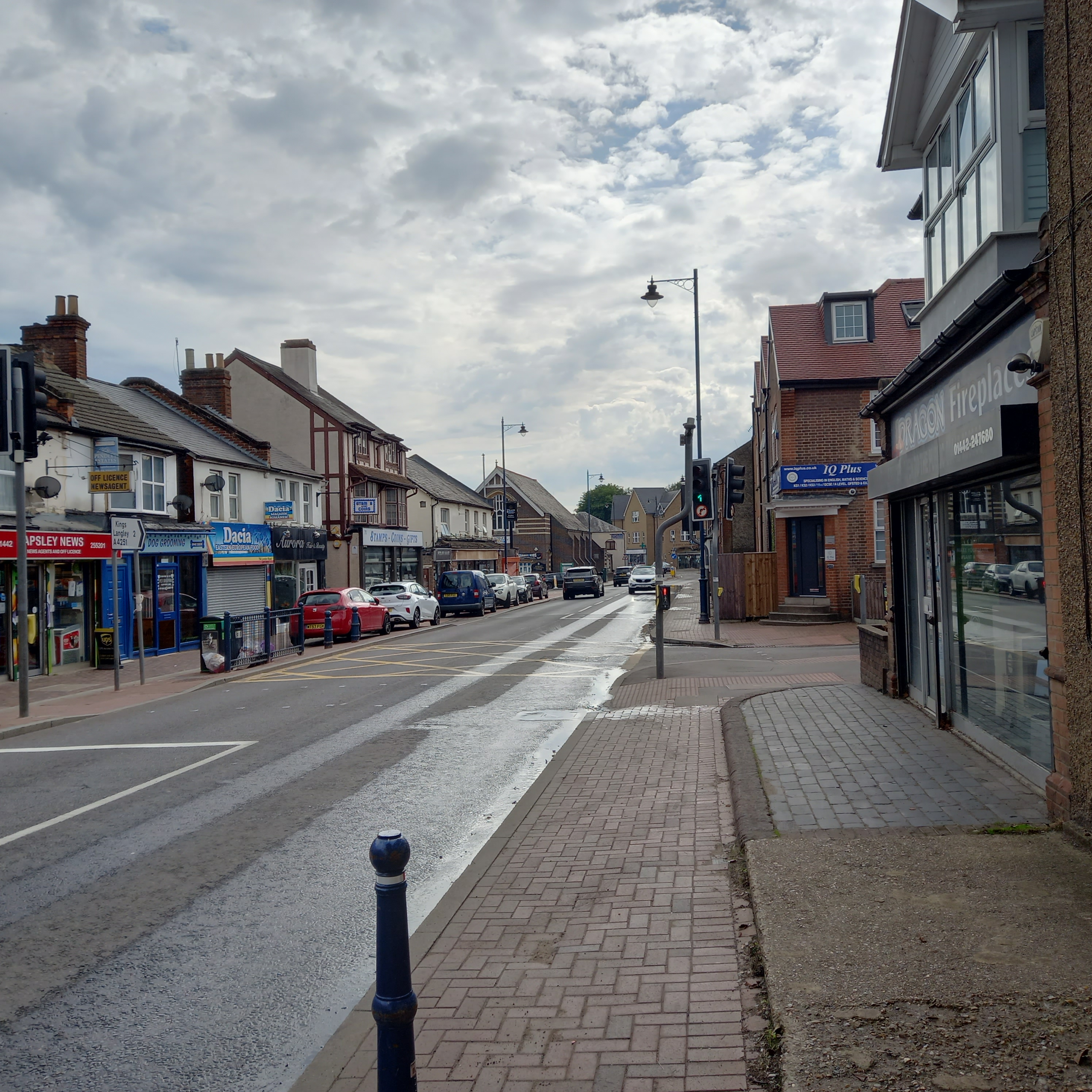
- London Road, Apsley, looking south.

- Location within Hertfordshire
- OS grid reference: TL0505
- District: Dacorum
- Shire county: Hertfordshire
- Region: East
- Country: England
- Sovereign state: United Kingdom
- Post town: HEMEL HEMPSTEAD
- Postcode district: HP3
- Dialling code: 01442
- Police: Hertfordshire
- Fire: Hertfordshire
- Ambulance: East of England
- UK Parliament: Hemel Hempstead

Apsley is a village in Hertfordshire, England, in a valley of the Chiltern Hills below the confluence of the River Gade and Bulbourne. It was the site of water mills serving local agriculture and from the early 19th century became an important centre for papermaking. Today it is a suburb of Hemel Hempstead.

== Origin of the name ==
The name Apsley dates from the Anglo-Saxon period and means aspen wood.

== History ==
=== 1798-1999 ===
It was the construction of the trunk canal (later to be called the Grand Union Canal) between London and the Midlands through the valley in 1798 that began its industrial rise at the start of the 19th century. The canal gave an easy way of transporting the raw and manufactured products to and from the mills.

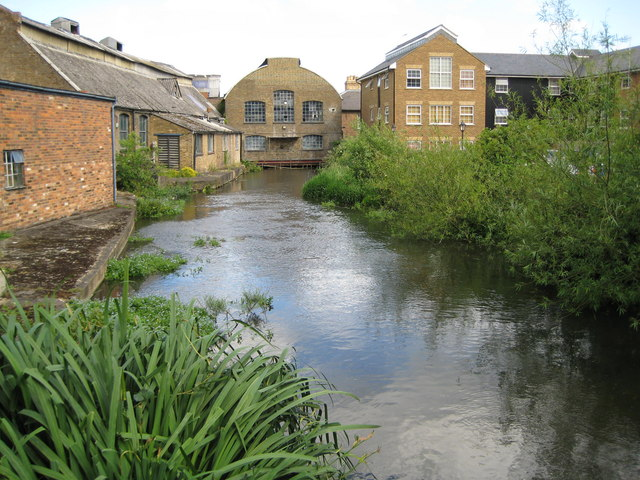
Frogmore Paper Mill, Apsley, Hertfordshire. The only surviving member of a number of 19th-century paper mills located in the town. It is now a museum, The Paper Trail.

John Dickinson, the inventor of a new method of continuous papermaking, purchased Apsley Mill in 1809. During the 1930s, Apsley Mill became a vast industrial complex and its owner, John Dickinson Stationery, acquired Shendish Manor for use as its sports and social club.

In the 1950s the adjacent town of Hemel Hempstead was designated a New Town as part of the provision of new residential areas surrounding London and Apsley became a part of the development, also giving its name to the new school of Apsley Grammar School at Bennetts End.

=== 21st century ===
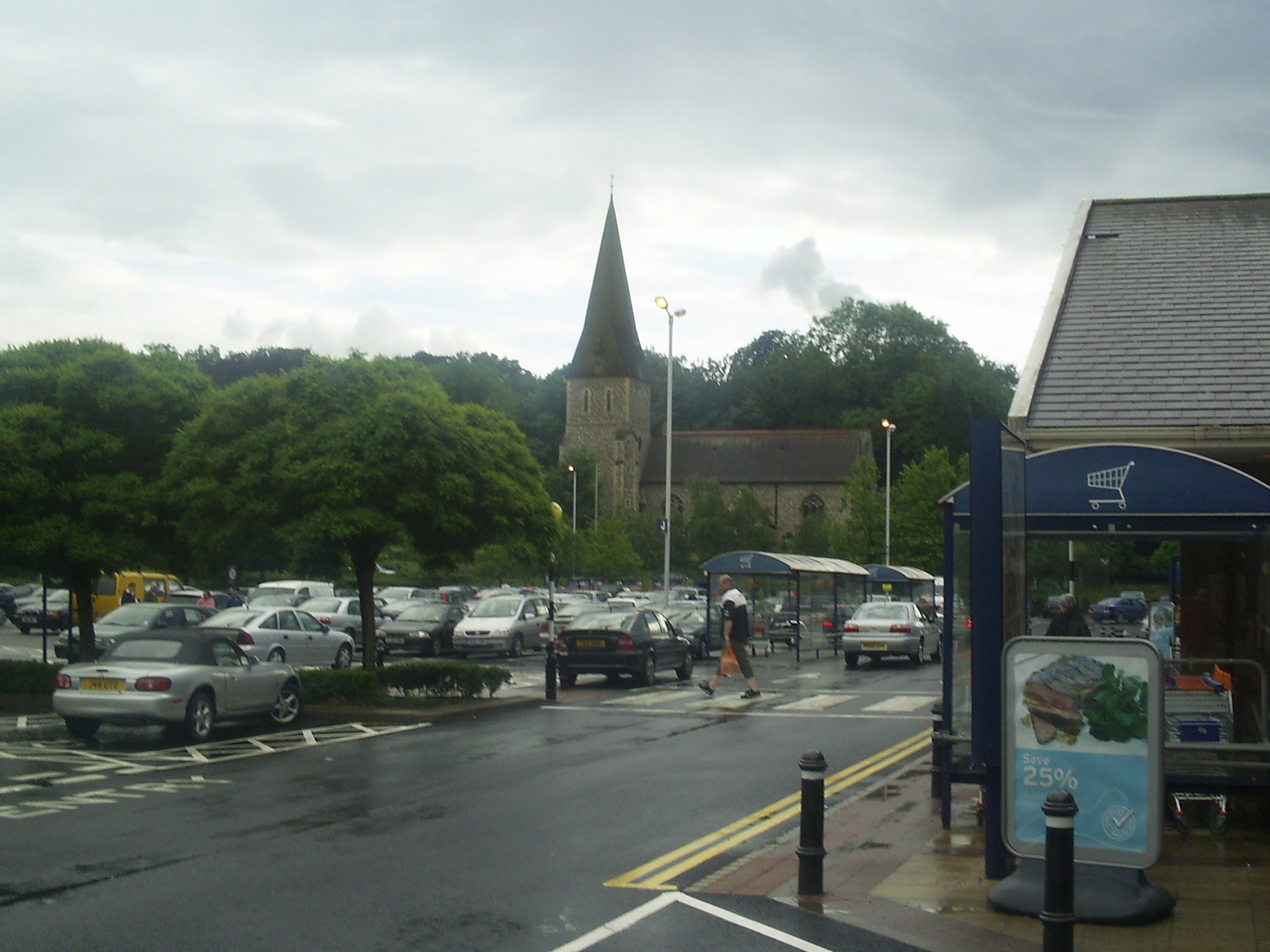
St Mary's Church (1871) stands above the modern Sainsbury's supermarket in Apsley. It was built to serve and inspire the workers of the paper mill that once occupied the supermarket site.

Apsley is an outer district of Hemel Hempstead and is still a busy commercial centre. The Victorian shops that grew up when it was a mill town now house newsagents, public houses, restaurants, and a range of small businesses. The former mill sites are taken up with supermarkets, retail parks and offices (including large offices on the Dolittle Meadows site occupied by Hertfordshire County Council, Epson, HSBC and until recently, British Telecom). Housing developments combining the canal-side location with the ease of access to Apsley railway station have been very successful, and Apsley Marina is a thriving location for boaters.

The local parish church is St Mary's, in London Road. There is also a Methodist church.

An important local issue since the summer of 2003 is the proposal to build on land surrounding the Manor Estate in Apsley that had previously been designated as green belt land. A new housing estate, called the Aspen Estate, has since been built on the hills above the Manor Estate.

Frogmore Paper Mill is a working paper mill and visitor centre located in some of the original mill buildings. Paper continued to be made until 2006 a short distance away at Nash Mill by the global Sappi group. This too closed for production in 2006 but continued as a distribution centre for some time.

== Apsley timeline ==
- 13th century – Ralf de Chenduit was granted land in the area. The local manor is still called Shendish Manor today.
- 1803 – First record of paper making in the area at Frogmore Mill.
- 1809 – John Dickinson, the inventor of a continuous mechanised papermaking process, purchased Apsley Mill and started making paper.
- 1811 – The Grand Junction Canal, later to be called the Grand Union Canal, opened to through traffic. The original route of part of the canal was higher up the side of the valley passing north of the George and the Three Tuns pubs on Belswains Lane. It put Apsley on the principal trade route from London to the north.
- 1836 – John Dickinson built his country house in nearby Nash Mills and called it Abbot's Hill. It is now a private school.
- 1838 – The London and Birmingham Railway passed through the valley adjacent to the site but no station was built. Canals continued to be the primary commercial means of transport for Apsley's mills.
- 1853 – Charles Longman, heir to the publisher Longman's and partner to John Dickinson, bought the Shendish estate and built an impressive manor house.
- 1871 – The Church at Apsley End was opened for public worship; its construction was funded by Charles Longman.
- 1938 – Apsley railway station was built with backing from John Dickinson Ltd as a way to bring more people to work at the mills.
- 1939–1945 – John Dickinson's was at its peak, and employed more than 7,000 workers. It made munitions as well as paper and paper products.
- 1999 – The last paper mills owned by John Dickinson were finally shut.
- 2003 – A working heritage and education centre was built around the framework of the remaining mill; its visitor centre aims to celebrate the links between the industry, the town and the international impact, innovations created in Apsley had upon the world.
- 2003 – Apsley Marina was established.
- 2011 – Local football club Apsley Athletic FC was formed.

== Landmarks ==
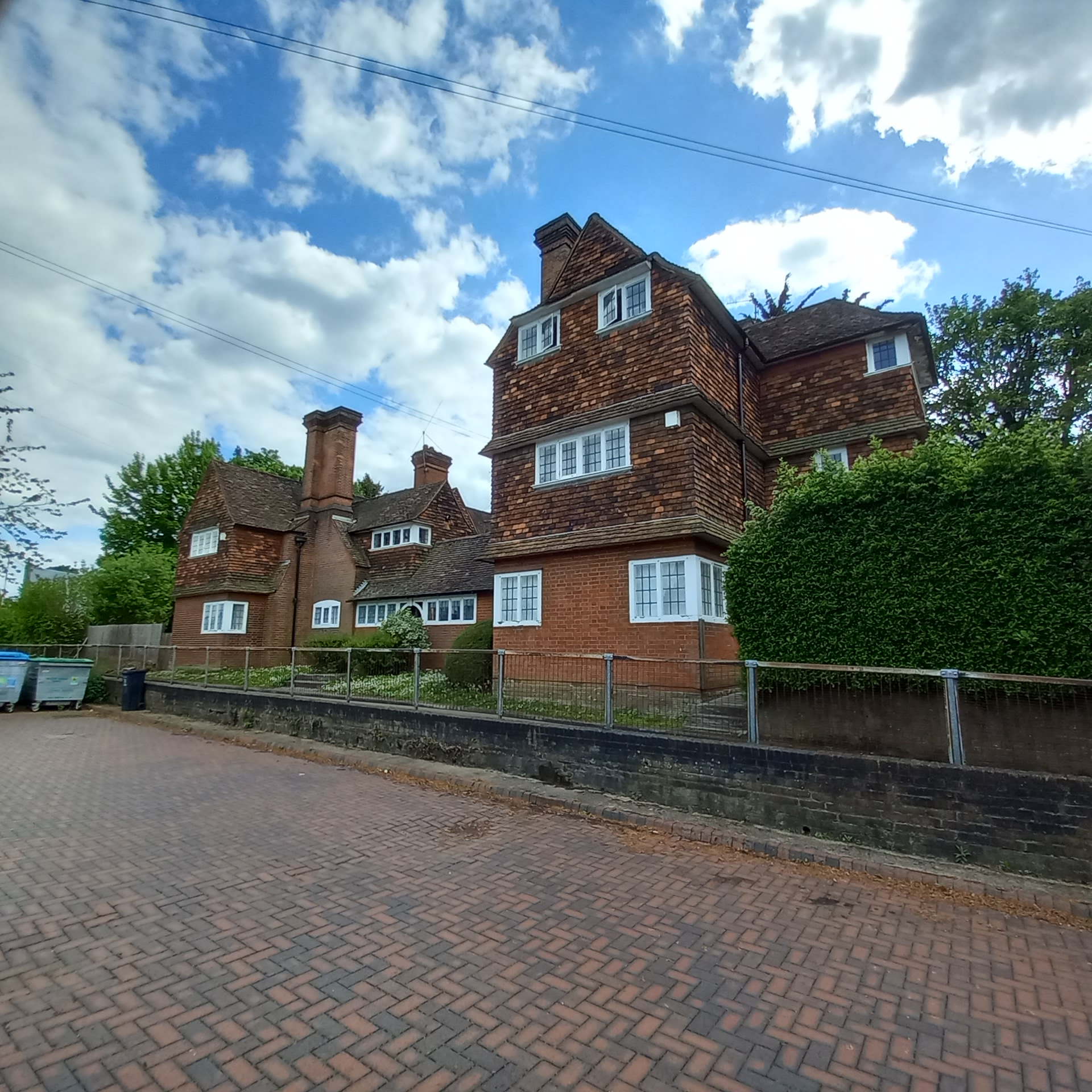
Snatchup End Cottages in London Road, were designed by Edwin Lutyens in 1898.

=== Shendish Manor ===
A large Jacobean style country house, built on the site of an ancient manor house in 1854–56 for Charles Longman of the publishing family. Now a hotel and country club, it is a Grade II listed building.

=== St Mary's Church, Apsley End ===
Built in London Road in 1871 at the instigation of, and largely funded by Charles Longman, to the design of architect Joseph Clarke. It is a Grade II listed building.

=== Snatchup End Cottages ===
A group of cottages in London Road designed by Edwin Lutyens in 1898 in the Arts and Crafts style. They are Grade II* listed.

== See also ==
- Apsley House, London, which has no connection with Apsley in Hertfordshire but takes its name from its first owner Baron Apsley, the 2nd Earl Bathurst. His title refers to Apsley, Sussex where the Bathurst family had connections. (The present holder of the Bathurst earldom is Allen Christopher Bertram Bathurst, 9th Earl Bathurst, whose son and heir uses the secondary title of Lord Apsley.)
- Kent Brushes
- Apsley has a minor semi-professional football team Apsley Argyle Football Club, which was formed in 2020 and currently plays in the Hertfordshire Senior County League First Division (Level 13 on the pyramid). They currently ground share at the home of Hemel Hempstead Town F.C. Vauxhall Road in the Adeyfield area of Hemel Hempstead.
