= Astley Cooper School =

The Astley Cooper School

Location
- St Agnells Lane; Hemel Hempstead, Hertfordshire, HP2 7HL; England; 51°46′33″N 0°26′52″W

Information
- Type: Community school
- Established: 1967, 1984
- Local authority: Hertfordshire
- Department for Education URN: 117552 Tables
- Ofsted: Reports
- Chair of Governing Body: Ian Harrison
- Headteacher: Samuel Orsborne
- Gender: Co-educational
- Age: 11 to 18
- Enrolment: 577
- Colours: Burgundy , white and sky blue
- Precursor: Grove Hill School
- Precursor: Highfield School
- Website: astleycooper.herts.sch.uk

The Astley Cooper School is an English 11–18 comprehensive school on the edge of Hemel Hempstead in Hertfordshire, England.

== History ==
The school was established in 1984 following a merger of two local schools, Grove Hill School and Highfield School. It occupies the former Grove Hill site on St Agnells Lane. The former Highfield site, on Fletcher Way, was redeveloped for housing. The school primarily serves the Grovehill, Woodhall Farm and Highfield neighbourhoods of Hemel Hempstead.

The school is named after Sir Astley Cooper, an English surgeon and anatomist. The school celebrated its 40th anniversary in 2007.

The school works in consortium with two neighbouring schools, Adeyfield and Longdean, as the East Dacorum Partnership, for post-16 provision.

The current headteacher is Samuel Osborne with Hannah Llyod as Senior Assistant Headteacher.

== Site and facilities ==
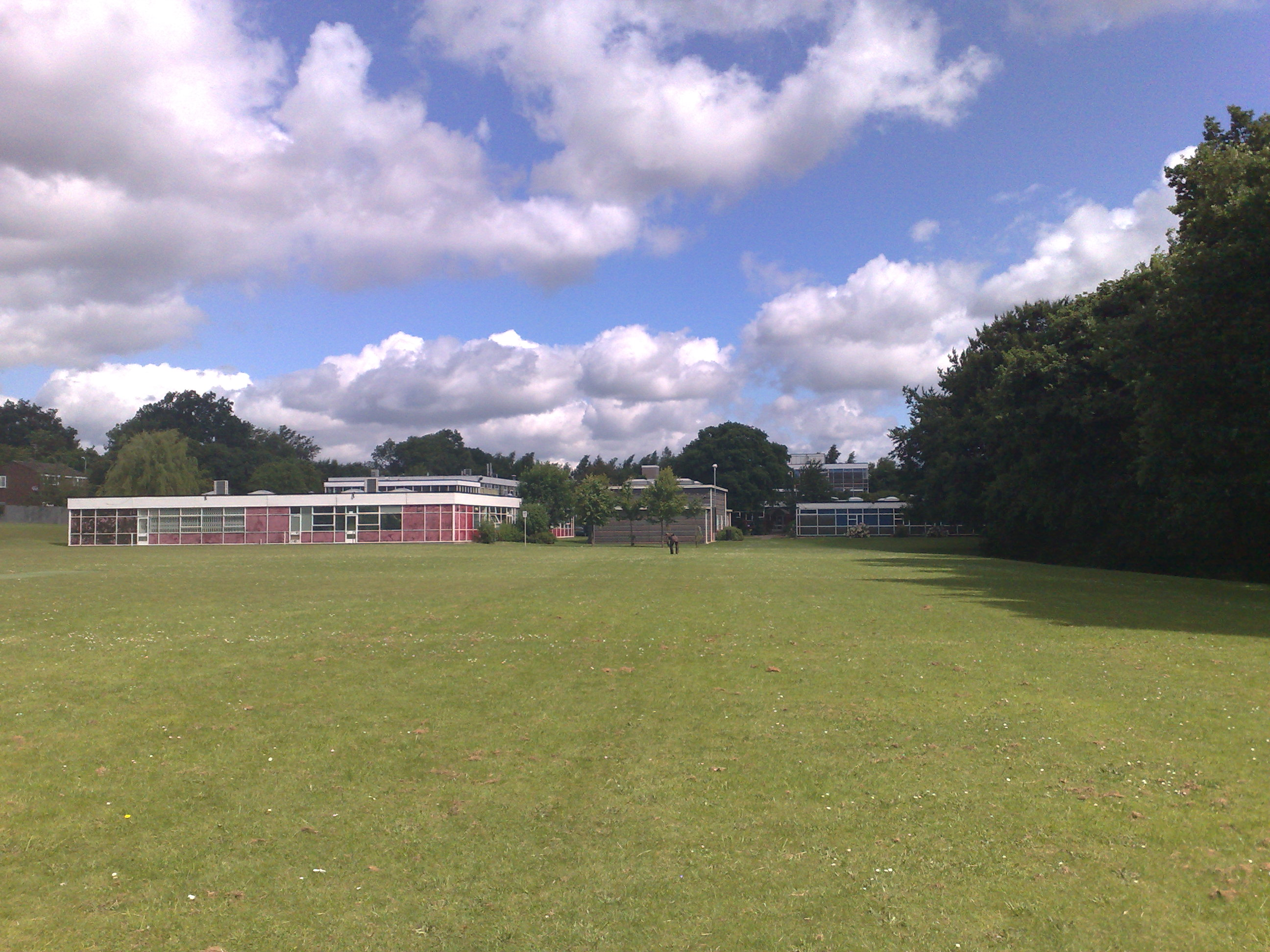
Astley Cooper School buildings

The school occupies a site in the Grovehill area of Hemel Hempstead. The school comprises teaching rooms, including laboratories, ICT suites, workshops, a food technology kitchen and a library. Most teaching rooms are equipped with an interactive whiteboard.

The award of Arts College status and its associated funding allowed the school to improve facilities for student learning. These included an iMac suite and newly equipped art studios, a dance studio and a drama studio. The sound capabilities of the main auditorium were improved allowing it to be used for concerts and shows. The school also contains a digital recording studio, photography suite, zen garden, organic vegetable allotment and a post-16 independent learning area.

Sports teaching facilities include playing fields, a gymnasium, basketball courts, a fitness suite and a swimming pool. The school participates in the Dacorum Sports Partnership, an umbrella organisation for sports organisations in Dacorum. The facilities have been used by local sports clubs including Hemel Hempstead Swimming Club.

== Curriculum ==
The school is an 11–18 comprehensive secondary school which follows the National Curriculum programme of study for core and foundation subjects. Pupils are taught towards GCSE, GNVQ and BTEC qualifications. The school consortium provides access to post-16 learning such as AS Level and A Level courses, GNVQ courses and vocational courses. Astley Cooper provides a pastoral support system and a learning needs' team.

Extracurricular activities include sport, art, music, drama, dance and creative writing clubs. The school has developed visiting artist-based art workshops centered on the theme of arts and ecology.

== Awards ==
The school was awarded specialist school status for the arts and has been awarded Artsmark Gold by Arts Council England. The school is a member of the Specialist Schools and Academies Trust.

The school has also been awarded the Sportsmark by Sport England for its delivery of the national PE, School Sports and Club Links Strategy. The school has implemented the Football Association's Charter Standard for Schools for football development.

The school has been recognised by Investors in People.

In 2013, headmaster Edward Gaynor won the Pearson Teaching Awards award for best headmaster in the East of England.

== Uniform ==
The school introduced a new school uniform in September 2008. It consists of a black blazer with the school logo, a white shirt worn with a burgundy and light blue necktie, black trousers, and black shoes. Pupils in years 10 and 11 may continue to wear the previous uniform, which includes a burgundy school sweatshirt and white polo shirt. Optional uniform items include a burgundy rain coat, sports polo shirt, specific sports strips and tracksuits.

== Initiatives ==
=== Visiting Authors Initiative ===
The school supports a Visiting Authors Initiative where authors are invited to speak at the school. These sessions are followed by a public book signing in partnership with Waterstone's. The aims of the sessions are to encourage young people, both at the school and in the wider community, to read more and to become engaged in creative writing. Students and members of the public are given opportunities to question the authors and to receive critiques of their works. Authors who have taken part in the initiative include:

- Frederick Forsyth
- Jodi Picoult
- Sophie Hannah
- Joanne Harris
- Mark Billingham
- Michael Dobbs
- Aidan Chambers
- Elizabeth Buchan
- John Connolly

=== Wind turbines ===
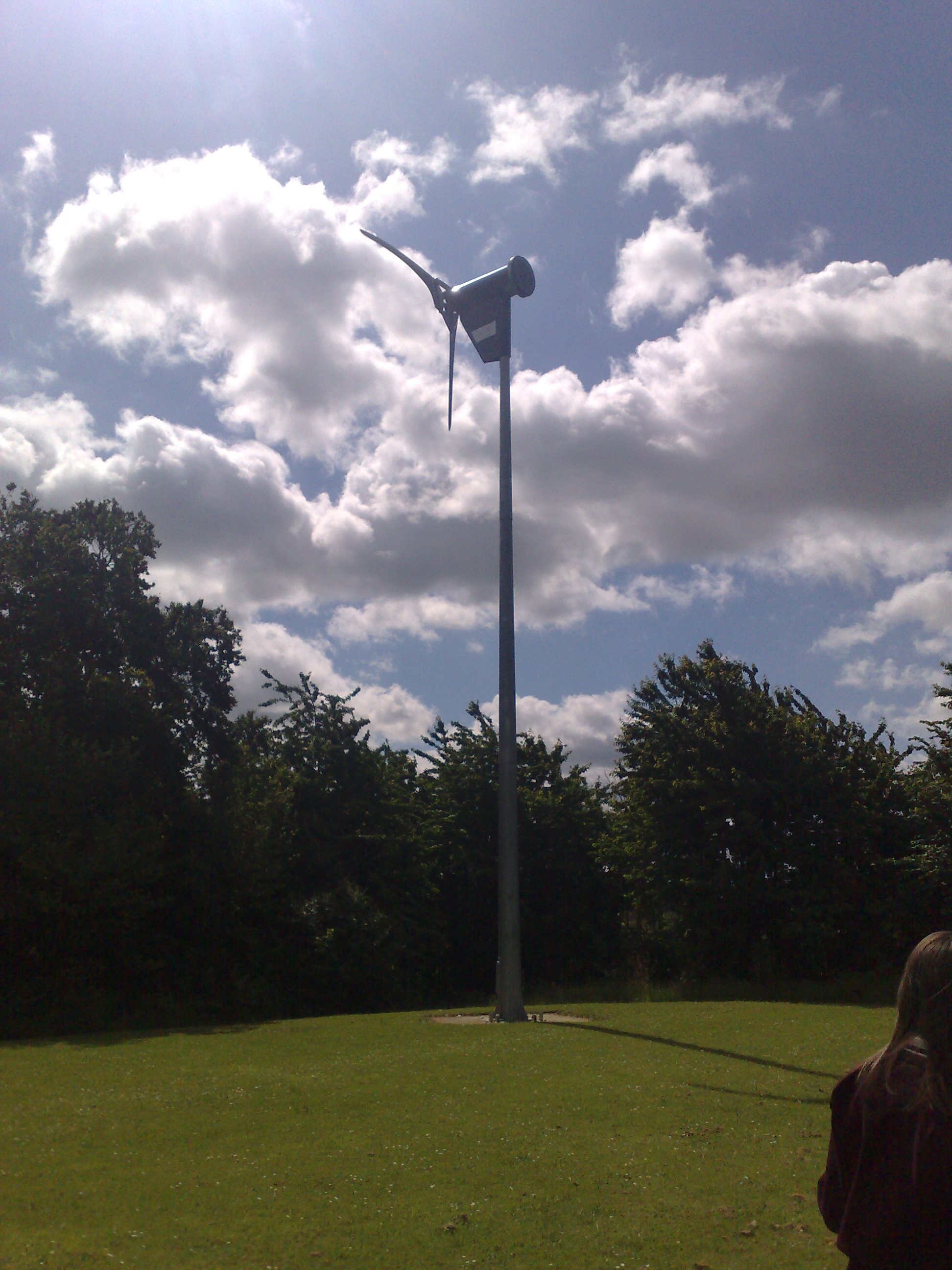
School wind turbine "Ivor"

The school was the first in Hertfordshire to install energy saving wind turbines. They will generate around 13,500 kWh of electricity every year and cut the buildings' carbon emissions by nearly six tonnes each year. Over the 25-year life of the turbines, they will displace 150 tonnes of carbon dioxide.

The school has also invested in a web-based monitoring system that will show students how much energy the turbines are generating, along with data on the amount of carbon dioxide being offset.
