= Shendish Manor =

Country house at Apsley

Coordinates: 51.7277°N 0.4697°W

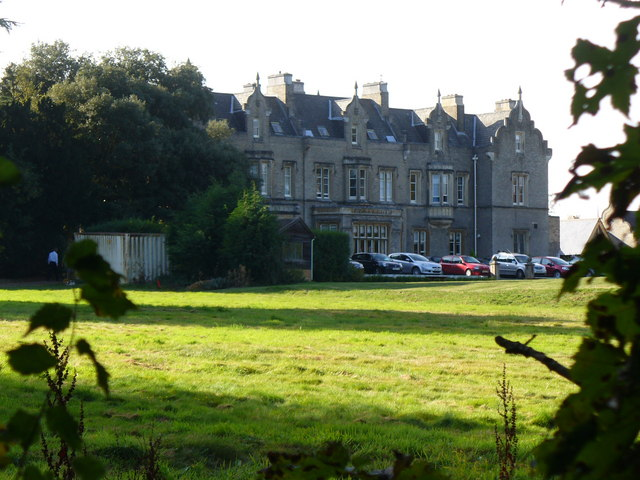
Shendish Manor

Shendish Manor is a country house at Apsley in Hertfordshire.

== History ==
The history of Shendish Manor goes back to the 13th century when Ralf de Chenduit was granted land in the area. Ralf de Chenduit's family built a manor on the site in about 1300; it passed to Richard and Alice Parker in about 1364, to John Cheyne, the local squire, in about 1560 and then to John Beale, a London grocer, in about 1650.

The house changed hands many times before coming into the ownership of Charles Longman, who was part of the long standing family publishing firm Longman, in 1853. Charles also joined the associated company of John Dickinson and Co. In 1835 he married Anna Maria Surman Lewis who was the daughter of John Hampton Lewis of Henllys in Wales.

In 1853 Charles Longman commissioned the architect John Griffith to build Shenish. The famous landscaper Edward Kemp was employed to design the gardens. Kemp wrote about this task in his book “How to Lay Out a Garden”. The house was described by one newspaper in the following terms:

"The mansion which Charles Longman erected at Shandish with its gardens, grounds and various appliances may well be cited as an instance of what can be done by taste skill and perseverance and as a model abode for an English Country Gentleman." He was the principal founder of the nearby St Mary’s Church which opened in 1871.

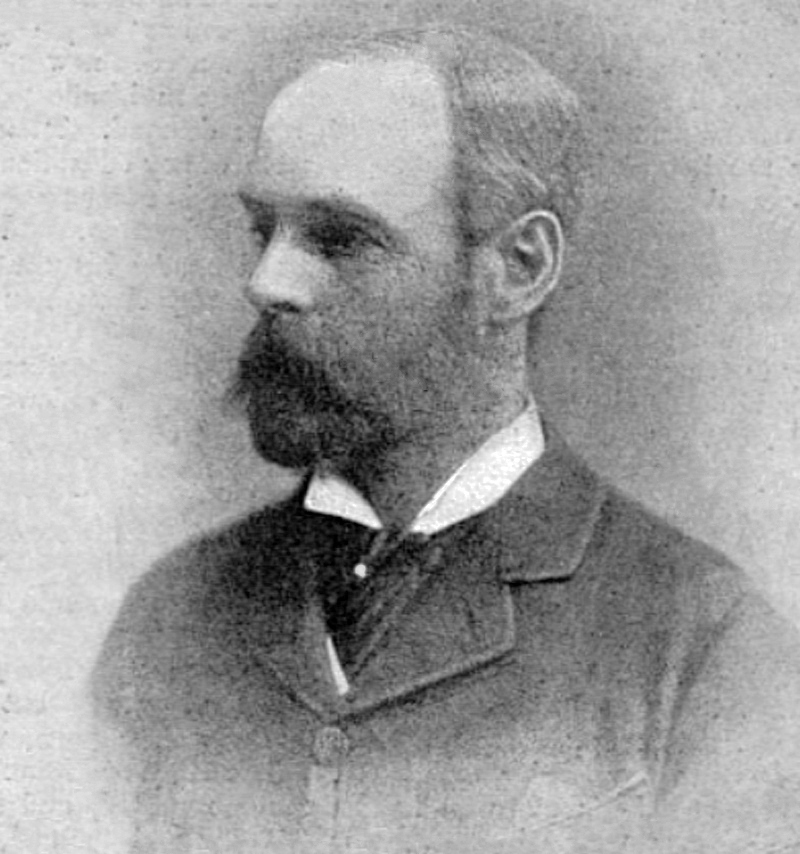
Thomas Norton Longman

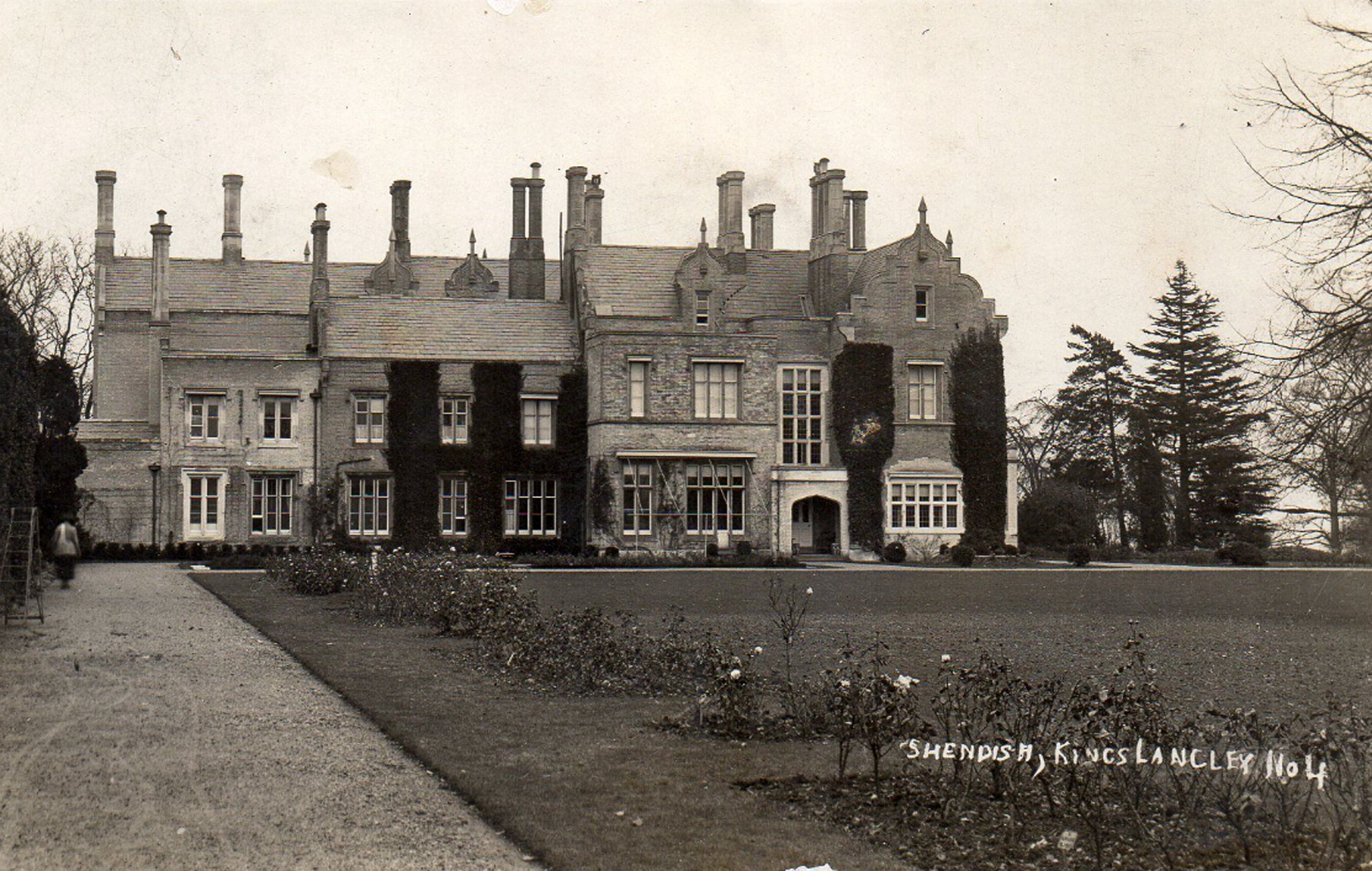
Shendish Manor in about 1900

When Charles died in 1873, his son Arthur Hampton Longman (1843–1908) inherited the property. He also inherited a very large fortune which had been accumulated by Charles. Arthur was also in the publishing business but was particularly interested in local public affairs. He was also enthusiastic about many forms of sport including hunting, yachting, shooting and fishing. An article, with photo, was in the publication "Baily's Magazine of Sports and Pastimes".

In 1866 he married Alicia Forster, daughter of John Forster of Malverleys, Newbury, Hampshire. However the couple had no children so when Arthur died in 1908 Shendish Manor was inherited by his cousin Thomas Norton Longman (1849–1930) who lived there from 1908. After Longman's father died he became a Director of the Longman publishing firm.

The house was used as a British Army camp during World War I. Henry Longman sold the property in 1936 to John Dickinson Stationery who used it as a sports and social club. In 1994 it became a hotel and conference centre.
