= Longdean School =

Location
- Rumballs Road; Hemel Hempstead, Hertfordshire, HP3 8JB; England; 51°44′31″N 0°26′35″W

Information
- Type: Academy
- Motto: Rejoice in thy Youth
- Established: 1955, 1970
- Department for Education URN: 137110 Tables
- Ofsted: Reports
- Head teacher: Ruth Georgiades
- Gender: Coeducational
- Age: 11 to 18
- Enrolment: 1,300
- Houses: Pascal, Gates, Da Vinci, Franklin
- Colours: Blue and Silver/White
- Precursor: Apsley Grammar School
- Precursor: Bennetts End Secondary Modern
- Website: http://www.longdeanschool.co.uk

Longdean School is a secondary school and sixth form with academy status, located in the southeast of Hemel Hempstead, Hertfordshire. The academy specialises in Maths and Computing.

== History ==
=== Grammar school ===
Originally called Apsley Grammar School, it began as a state grammar school in Hemel Hempstead. It was founded in 1955 as part of the development of the town after its designation as a new town and the need for expanded secondary school provision. Although named for the nearby village of Apsley the school is actually situated about one mile away, in the Bennetts End district of the town. Its first Head Teacher was Valentine (V.J.) Wrigley.

=== Comprehensive ===
The name of the school changed to Longdean School in 1970 on the amalgamation with the adjacent Bennett's End Secondary Modern School to form what was the third-largest comprehensive school in Hertfordshire at the time.

The school motto of Rejoice in Thy Youth was retained after the amalgamation.

Since September 2025 the headmaster has been Mrs Ruth Georgiades, replacing the previous headmaster, Mr Graham Cunningham. The last Ofsted report classed the school as a 'GOOD'.

The school operates community facilities in the form of a sports centre, small Astro pitch, grass pitches and Multi Use Games Area.

=== Academy ===
During the summer term of 2011, Longdean School attained academy status.

The school works in consortium with two neighbouring schools to enhance post-16 provision. The group consists of Adeyfield Academy, Astley Cooper School and Longdean School. Staff development and well-being are also coordinated at consortium level.

In May 2012, Longdean was included in the Government's £2 billion Priority School Building Programme. Longdean's inclusion was based upon the condition of its existing buildings that have exceeded their 25-year life expectancy. As a result, a completely new school building was constructed by Interserve/Kajima on former playing fields and both the existing premises were demolished. The new school opened at the end of 2016.

== Admissions ==
Longdean is a non-selective coeducational school within the state education system, accepting pupils from its catchment area of Bennetts End, Nash Mills, Leverstock Green and adjacent areas.

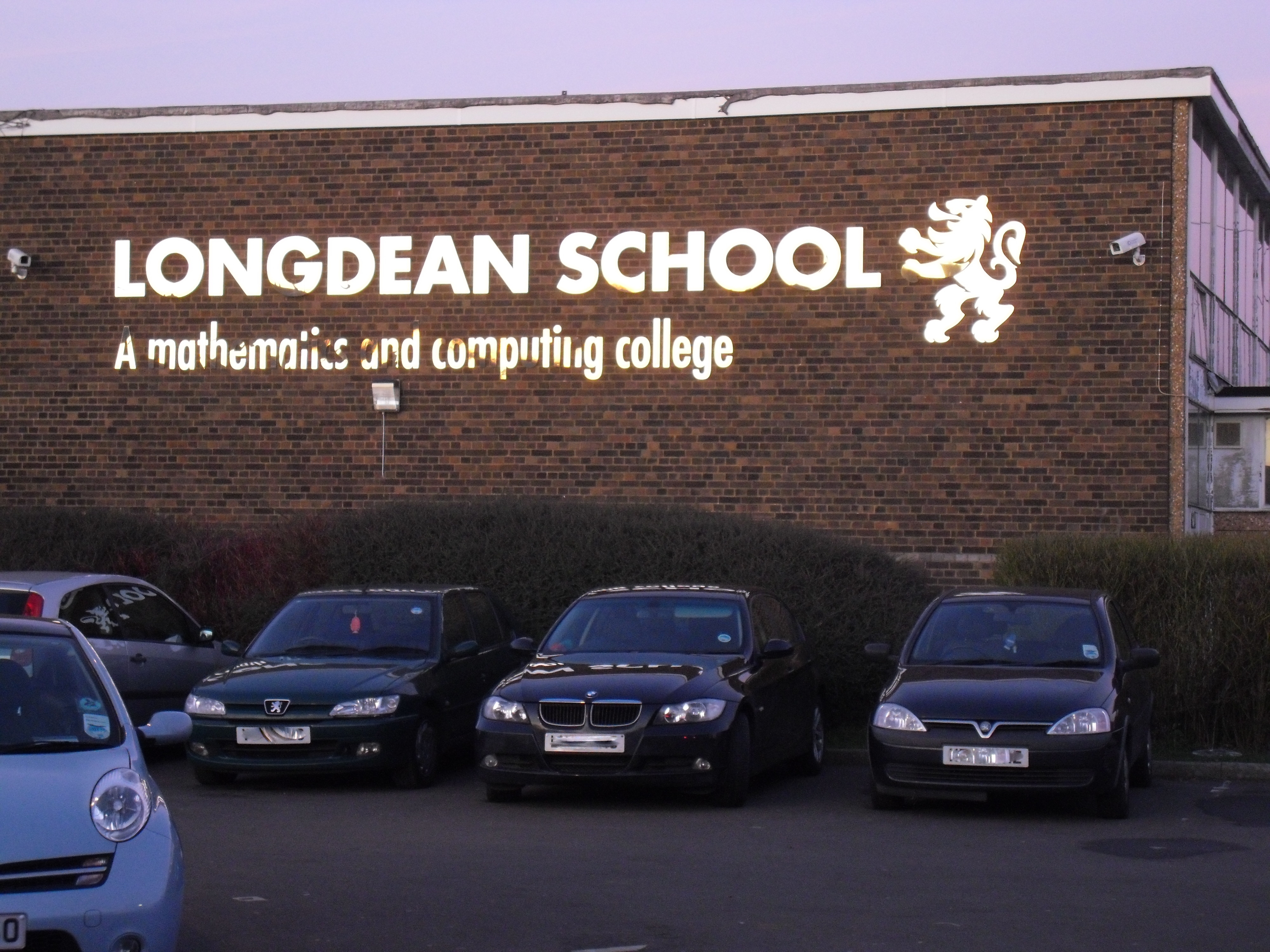

== Notable former pupils ==
=== Apsley Grammar School ===
- Paul Boateng, (now Baron Boateng) – the UK's first black Cabinet minister, and British High Commissioner to South Africa from March 2005 to April 2009.
- Prof Hugh Loxdale MBE, entomologist, Professor of Ecology from 2009 to 2010 at the Institute of Ecology, University of Jena, and President from 2004–6 of the Royal Entomological Society of London
- Andy Powell – guitarist in the rock group Wishbone Ash
- Sue Hayes - London Film Commissioner, award-winning documentary producer and director of Edinburgh International Television Festival

=== Longdean School ===
- Chris Eagles – Professional football player, enrolled in Manchester United youth academy before turning pro, now playing for Ross County F.C.
- Jake Howells – Professional football player, currently playing for Dagenham & Redbridge.
- Max Whitlock- a member of Britain's gymnastics team and bronze medalist at the London 2012 Summer Olympics and double gold medallist on floor exercise and pommel horse at both the Rio de Janeiro 2016 Summer Olympics and Tokyo 2020 Summer Olympics.
- Jessica Stretton- a member of Britain's Paralympic team and gold medalist at the Rio de Janeiro 2016 Summer Olympics.

== Notable former staff ==
=== Apsley Grammar School ===
- Iris du Pré – music department
- Prof David Daniell, Professor of English from 1992 to 1994 at University College London (sixth form master from 1958 to 1969)
