= Kent Brushes =

British shaving supplies manufacturer

- Company type: Private
- Industry: Consumer packaged goods
- Founded: 1777
- Founders: William Kent
- Headquarters: Kent
- Area served: United Kingdom
- Key people: Steve Wright (CEO)
- Number of employees: 43 (2015)
- Website: kentbrushes.com

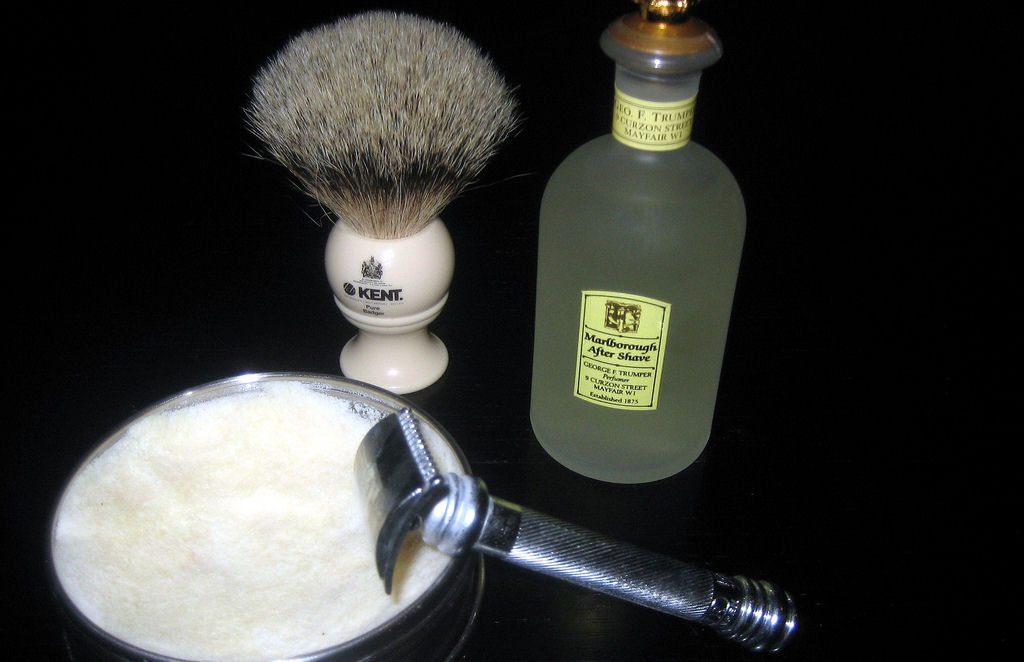
A Kent Brushes badger-hair shaving brush

G. B. Kent & Sons (trading as Kent Brushes) is a British manufacturer of brushes and one of the country's oldest independent companies. It was established in London in 1777 by William Kent, and manufacturing moved to its current site at Apsley, Hertfordshire, in 1901. The company has supplied brushes to nine successive British monarchs since George IV in 1820 and produced hundreds of thousands of brushes for servicemen in both world wars. The company was sold to Eric Cosby in 1932 and his descendants continue to own it. In recent years the company has expanded, targeting the export market.

== History ==
=== 18th and 19th centuries ===
The company was founded in 1777 by William Kent, who had moved from Yorkshire to London to sell luxury grooming brushes to army officers. Kent's son, also called William, took over the business and moved to larger premises on Great Marlborough Street in 1807. The firm first supplied the British monarch, then George IV, in 1820 and held a royal warrant for the next nine monarchs, recognising that it had supplied them all with brushes. The company's first print advertisement appeared in the 12 June 1824 edition of The Times.

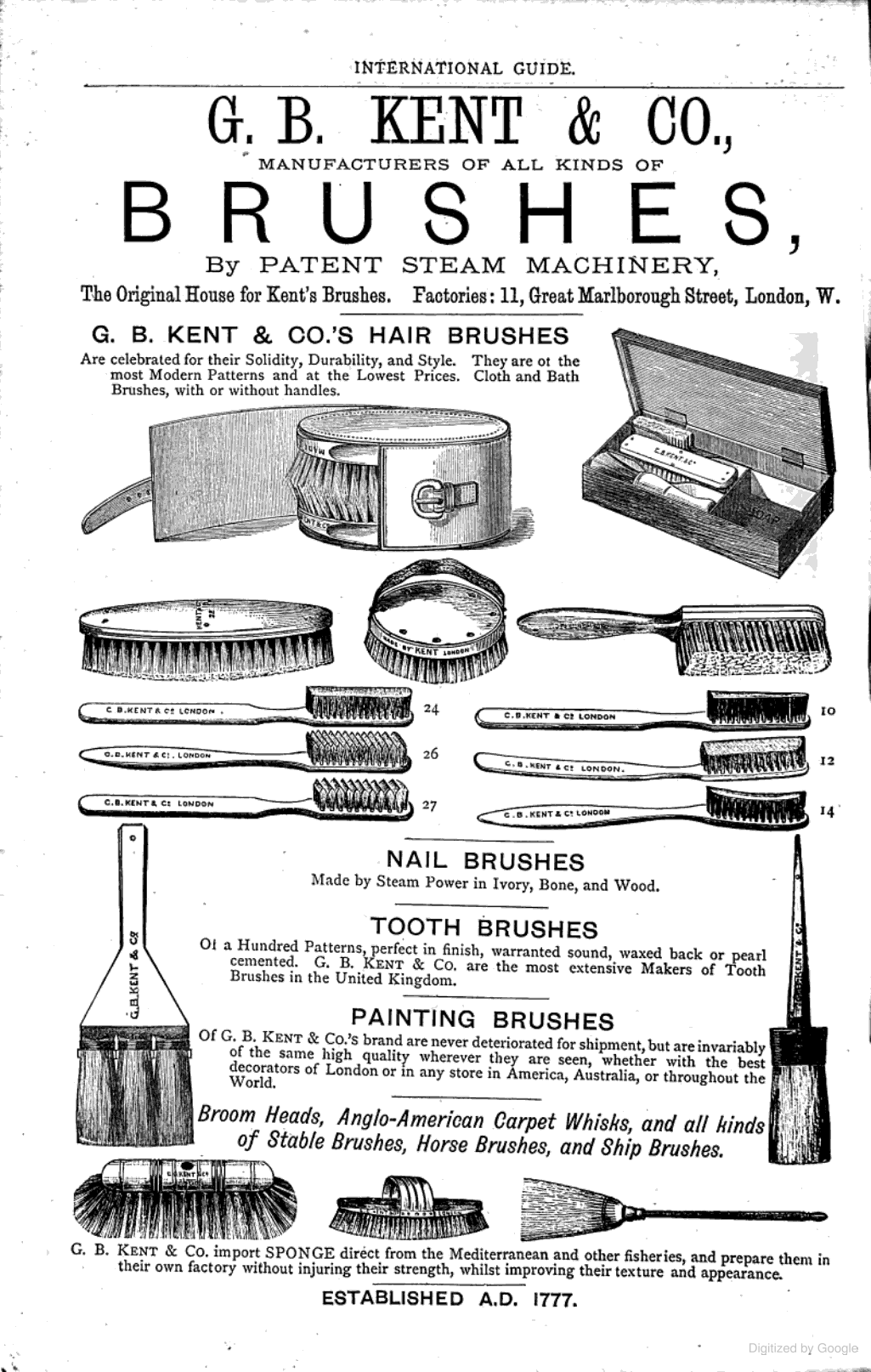
Advert for Kent Brushes, 1872

William Kent Junior died in 1836 and the company passed to his brothers John James Kent and Henry John James Kent. From this point the firm was known as "John James Kent & Co." The firm was awarded a medal for services provided during the Great Exhibition of 1851. John James's son, George Barton Kent, took over the business and renamed it after himself. During this time the company was a major consumer of bullock bone; the animal's leg bone was used to make toothbrush handles and the company required the bones of 600 cattle and a ton of bristles to maintain its output of 8,640 toothbrushes a week. By 1882 it employed 600 staff, 150 of them in the manufacture of toothbrushes alone, at several sites in London.

George Kent died in 1890 and his three sons took on the business, giving it its present name of "G. B. Kent & Sons". In 1897 the offices and warehouses were moved to a six-storey building on Farringdon Road, becoming the largest brush warehouse in the country. A new factory was established on a 5-acre (2.0 ha) site in Apsley, Hertfordshire, in 1901 to consolidate all brush manufacturing. The Apsley factory had a wharf on the River Gade that was used to receive imported bristles from Russia, China and India, badger hair from Germany and the Balkans, whalebone from the Antarctic and fibre from Mexico, Brazil and Africa. Wood for handles was cherry, birch and sycamore from England and tropical timbers from Sri Lanka, the West Indies, South America and Indonesia.

=== 20th century ===
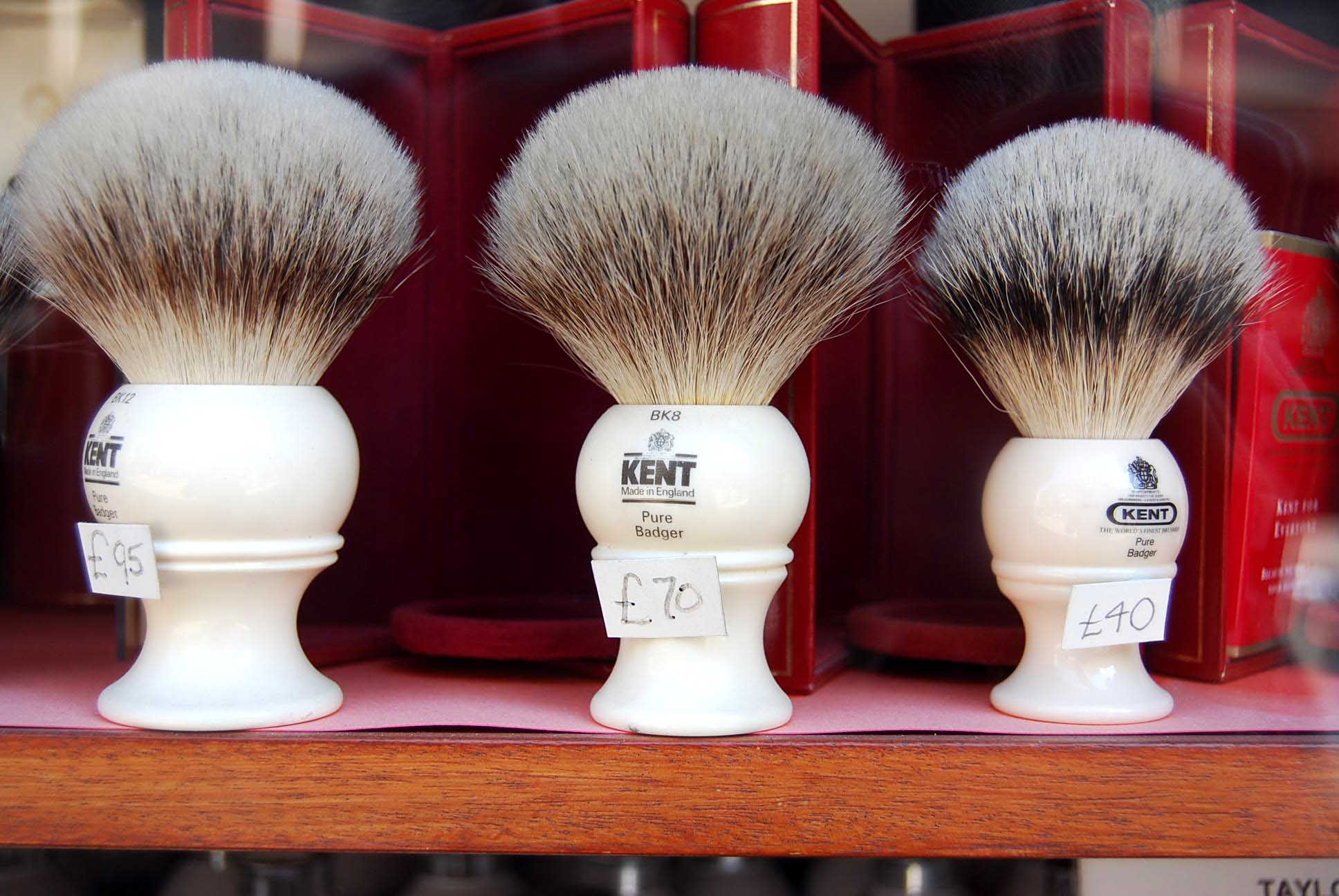
Kent badger-hair shaving brushes

In the early 20th century the company was one of the first to begin using motorised vans for deliveries. During the First World War the company was a major War Office supplier, providing numerous brushes for the soldiers' personal kits as well as horse brushes. The company developed wooden-handled and vegetable-fibre brushes for the use by Indian troops as bullock bones offended Hindus and pig bristles Muslims. The company maintains a wooden war memorial plaque listing the names of 17 employees who died in the war.

The Kent line died out in 1932 and the business was sold to Eric Cosby. Cosby introduced innovations including a hairbrush with a detachable bristle holder so it could be refilled. The business remains owned by Cosby's descendants. During the Second World War, the factory was damaged by bombs 17 times. The headquarters were relocated from London to Apsley in 1940. The company supplied hundreds of thousands of brushes to the British Army during the war. A standard kit included seven of Kent Brushes' products including shaving brushes, hair brushes, toothbrushes, and brushes for cleaning cloth, buttons and shoes. It also made brushes for MI9, a department of the War Office concerned with helping prisoners of war to escape. These included hidden compartments into which maps and compasses were concealed; the opening was concealed under the bristles. These products were produced in a locked and windowless room of the factory and were known to only five members of the workforce. Cosby's son, Eric Cosby Junior, returned from army service in 1942 and was appointed a director. He expanded the business in the post-war years to new export markets, opened a factory for paintbrushes in Deal, Kent, and a retail shop on Piccadilly. Cosby issued shares in the company in 1952 that funded further expansion, including the use of plastics. A range of products in the 1950s used wood recovered from the old Waterloo Bridge and HMS Victory.

The firm held the trademark on "Kent" in the United States. In 1953 it failed in the United States District Court for the Southern District of New York to prevent the use of the name by the R. J. Reynolds Tobacco Company for Kent cigarettes. The U.S. Patent Office ruled against a company seeking to use "Elizabeth Kent" for cosmetic products in 1958 and Kent Brushes successfully defended a 1962 appeal of that case to the United States Court of Customs and Patent Appeals. The popularity of moustaches in the 1960s was such that the company reintroduced moustache brushes, which had long been discontinued.

In 1967 control of the company passed to Eric Junior's son, Alan Cosby, who remains managing director and chairman. Alan centralised all operations to the Apsley site from 1970 to reduce costs. He also introduced lines that were sold in major retailers such as Boots and Superdrug. A 200-foot (61 m) chimney with "Kents Brushes" lettering down the side stood at the factory until it was demolished by the 1980s. By 2015 a metal sculpture had been installed outside the factory depicting a lady brushing her hair.

=== 21st century ===
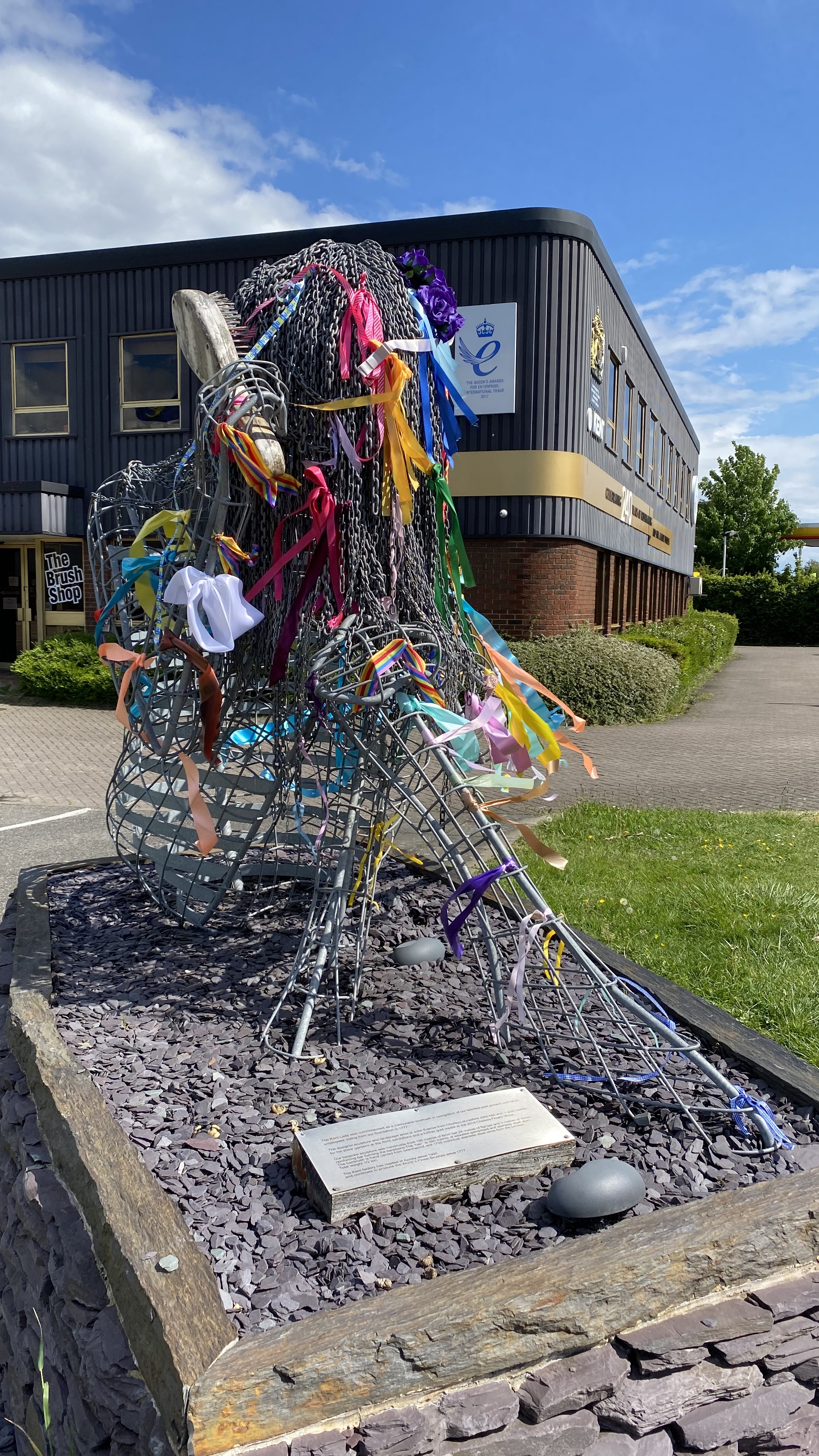
Statue and factory, 2020

Kent Brushes suffered badly during the 2008 financial crisis; in 2009 it made a pre-tax loss of £277,000 after having to pay compensation to end a contract early. Sales then fell from £3.8m in 2011 to £3.7m in 2012, causing pre-tax profits to halve to £250,000. The company began a modernisation programme in 2013, bringing in new machinery and equipment and refocusing from traditional hairbrushes to high-end grooming products. They brought more manufacturing in-house and staff levels rose from 30 in 2013 to 43 by 2015. The company saw exports rise from £804,000 in 2009 to £2m in 2014 and £2.7m in 2015 and turnover rose from £3.7m in 2012 to £5.8m in 2014 and £6.8m in 2015. The increased outputs saw Kent Brushes listed as one of the Financial Times's top 1,000 growing European businesses of the 2014–2017 period.

In 2019 the firm announced that it would phase out the use of badger bristles in its shaving brushes, in favour of synthetic alternatives, following concerns over animal welfare. In May 2022 Steve Wright was appointed as chief executive officer. That year the company was named Export Business of the Year by the Bedfordshire Chamber of Commerce and won the East of England Regional Award.

In 2023 the firm lost £1.6m after fraudsters tricked the financial controller of the company into giving them access to its bank account in an authorised push payment fraud. Turnover at this point was around £11m. The company's bank, Barclays, held them accountable for the loss and refused to pay any compensation. The company's toothbrushes are particularly popular in South Korea and in 2023 it relaunched its dental range to appeal to wider markets.
