= Adeyfield =

Area of Hemel Hempstead, Hertfordshire, England

Coordinates: 51.755831°N 0.451625°W

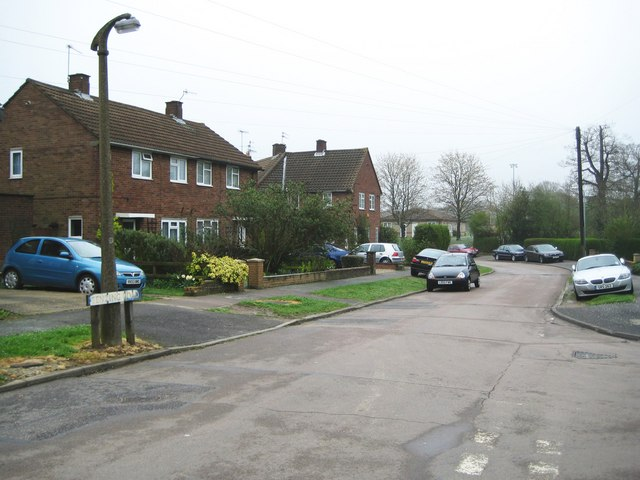
- Post war New Town housing in Adeyfield

- Location within Hertfordshire
- Population: 11,012 (2011 Census. Adeyfield East and West Wards)
- OS grid reference: TL069074
- District: Dacorum
- Shire county: Hertfordshire
- Region: East
- Country: England
- Sovereign state: United Kingdom
- Post town: Hemel Hempstead
- Postcode district: HP2
- Dialling code: 01442
- Police: Hertfordshire
- Fire: Hertfordshire
- Ambulance: East of England
- UK Parliament: Hemel Hempstead

Adeyfield was the first planned neighbourhood to be built in the postwar new town expansion of Hemel Hempstead, in the English county of Hertfordshire. The keys to the first houses to be occupied, in Homefield Road, were handed over to their tenants in February 1950. The Queens Square shopping parade was visited by Queen Elizabeth II on 20 July 1952, to lay the first foundation slab of St. Barnabas Church.

== The area ==
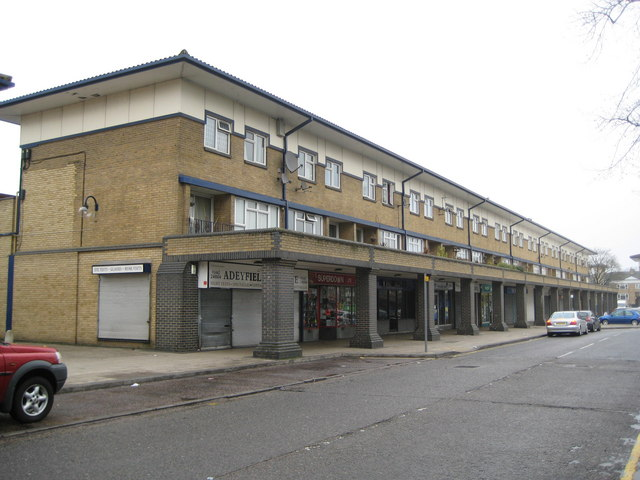
Part of Queens Square neighbourhood shopping centre at Adeyfield

Adeyfield is mainly a mixture of New Town properties built to the south of Adeyfield Road and houses built privately in the 40s, 50s and 60s on the north side. There are also a few older terraced cottages near the junction of Adeyfield Road and Great Road. There is one large Victorian house and this is shown on the 1898 Ordnance Survey map as being the only house in the area at the time, apart from Adeyfield Farm.

The neighbourhood spans from the Hemel Hempstead Industrial Estate in the east, to Queensway in the north, to the A414 (St Albans Road) in the south, to the Town Centre in the west. It borders the neighbourhoods of Highfield, Bennetts End, Leverstock Green and the town centre (known locally as Paradise).

The location was originally farmland occupied by Coxpond Farm and Adeyfield Farm. It was planned by the chief architect for the new town, Mr H Kellet Ablett who received the 'Urban Medal' for his work from the Eastern Housing Region. As well as housing the area has new town built shops, schools, churches, a community centre and playing fields. By 1956 the development corporation described the area as complete.

In order to provide some quick, easy and cheap accommodations after the Second World War, the easternmost part of Adeyfield was the chosen site for a set of temporary tin houses known as pre-fabs. The houses remain to this day, however the exterior tin has now been covered up by sheets of white wood and cladding on most of the houses.

== Places of worship ==
There are four churches in the District, St Barnabas, in the Queen's Square, Jubilee Christian Fellowship which is also in Queens Square in the Community Centre, the Adeyfield Free Church, on the border of the district on Leverstock Green Road, and the Catholic Church on St Albans Road.

== Schools ==
Adeyfield is home to The Adeyfield Academy, the major secondary school in the area and two primary schools (see Primary schools in Dacorum).

== The Queen's Square ==
In common with the rest of the planned neighbourhoods in Hemel Hempstead, Adeyfield has a village centre, known as the Queen's Square. There are many different convenience stores in the square, most notably the Co-operative Supermarket, and two branches of Lloyd's Pharmacy. The square was named after the visit paid by The Queen in 1952 when she laid the foundation stone for the Church of St Barnabas.

== Evelyn Sharp House ==
During the 1970s the Commission for New Towns and Dacorum Borough Council invested in developing sheltered housing provision for the elderly in the town - a ground-breaking development at the time. The first of these was Evelyn Sharp House, located in Field Road, Adeyfield. A full-time, on-site Warden was available to support the needs of the residents. The first Warden of ESH was Jean Roberts, who was there for 18 years from its opening until her retirement. Arrangements for supporting residents and managing the property have changed since, and there is no longer an on-site Warden.
