= Sue Hayes =

British film and television executive (1951–2021)

- Born: 29 April 1951; London, England
- Died: 23 April 2021 (aged 69)
- Occupation(s): Film producer and London Film Commissioner
- Known for: Supporting film in London

Sue Hayes (29 April 1951 – 23 April 2021) was a British film and television executive who, as London Film Commissioner, was instrumental in championing London as an international filming destination. She also directed Edinburgh International Film & Television Festival and won an International Emmy for her documentary "For The Sake of the Children" in 1991.

== Early life ==
Sue Hayes was born 29 April 1951 in London, eldest child of James Hayes (who worked in the Vauxhall Car Plant in Luton) and Alice Hayes (née Manuel).

She attended Apsley Grammar School, Hemel Hempstead, and studied economics and sociology at City University.

== Career ==
Hayes' early career was as a journalist for the Daily Mirror, Der Spiegel and the Sunday Times, before working as a researcher for Granada TV and then as a producer at companies including Channel 4, ITV, Granada TV and The History Channel.

From 1979 to 1983 she was director of the Edinburgh International Television Festival.

In 1989 she launched an independent production company, VPL, which made TV documentaries, including For the Sake of the Children (1991), which won an International Emmy.

In 2000, Hayes was appointed the commissioner of the London Film Commission (now Film London), and was its head until 2010. She was involved in the establishment of the London Filming Partnership and in both these roles was a key figure in London becoming a go-to location for international productions.

== Death ==
Hayes died on 23 April 2021, at the age of 69. Hayes was survived by her partner, producer Rod Caird. He died on 12 October 2021, at the age of 73.
