= Adeyfield Academy =

Academy in Hertfordshire, England

The Adeyfield Academy
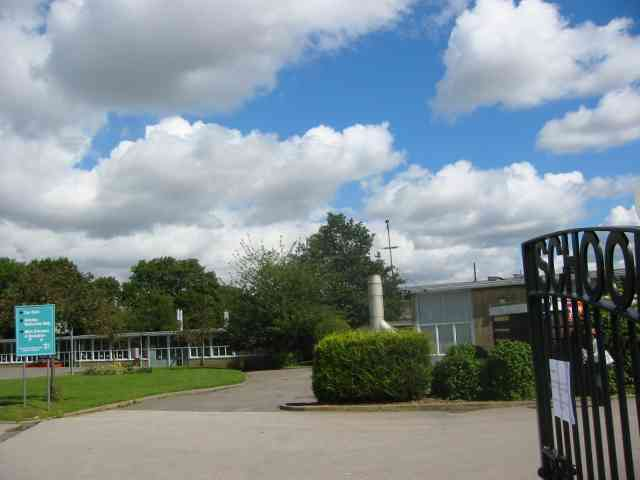

Location
- Longlands, Adeyfield; Hemel Hempstead, Hertfordshire, HP2 4DE; England; 51°45′12″N 0°26′56″W

Information
- Type: Academy
- Established: 1953
- Local authority: Hertfordshire County Council
- Trust: Ambition Education Trust
- Department for Education URN: 145430 Tables
- Ofsted: Reports
- Head teacher: Dawn Mason
- Gender: Mixed
- Age range: 11–18
- Capacity: 870
- Website: www.adeyfieldschool.org

The Adeyfield Academy (formerly Adeyfield School) is an 11–18 mixed, secondary school and sixth form with academy status in Adeyfield, Hemel Hempstead, Hertfordshire, England. It is part of the Atlas Multi Academy Trust.

The school was founded in 1953, initially as a secondary modern school and is now an all ability- comprehensive school.

The school works in consortium with two neighbouring schools to enhance post-16 provision. The consortium consists of Adeyfield School, Astley Cooper School and Longdean School. Staff development and wellbeing is also coordinated at consortium level.

The school has many awards, including an International Schools status. As a result of this, a club called "The YEC", standing for "Young Earth Citizen" was formed to link Adeyfield with other schools around the world. One project that they work on is to write articles for an online magazine.

== Leadership ==
- Margaret Chapman – executive head teacher (Ambition Education Trust)
- Dawn Mason – Headteacher
- Imogen Walbank – Deputy Headteacher
- Aza Hoque – Assistant Headteacher
- Charlotte Rose – Assistant Headteacher
- Liz Polson – Assistant Headteacher
- Michael Molokuw - Assistant Headteacher
- Jo Day – associate assistant principal
- Michelle Forni - Associate Assistant Headteacher
- Sam Rogers - Business Manager

== Ofsted ==
The Adeyfield Academy's last Ofsted inspection was January 2023. The Adeyfield Academy was rated GOOD by Ofsted. Key comments:

- Students at Adeyfield enjoy being part of a close-knit school community.
- Expectations for behaviour, courtesy and personal presentation are high. These are both modelled and applied consistently by staff.
- In lessons, pupils benefit from consistent routines and knowledgeable teaching.
- Trust and school leaders are ambitious and have raised expectations for what pupils can achieve.
- Pupils’ character and resilience are developed very well.
- Working relationships in classrooms are strong, characterised by mutual respect between teachers and pupils

== Uniform ==
Adeyfield was one of the last secondary schools to have school jumpers. This changed in late 2007 to school ties (of the school colours, jade green and silver), white shirts, and black blazers.

== Housing system ==
The school has six houses:

- Attenborough (Green)
- Hawking (Blue)
- Kahlo (Orange)
- Parks (Red)
- Seacole (Yellow)
- Turing (Purple)
