= Apsley Marina =

Marina in Hertfordshire, England

Coordinates: 51.7333°N 0.4596°W

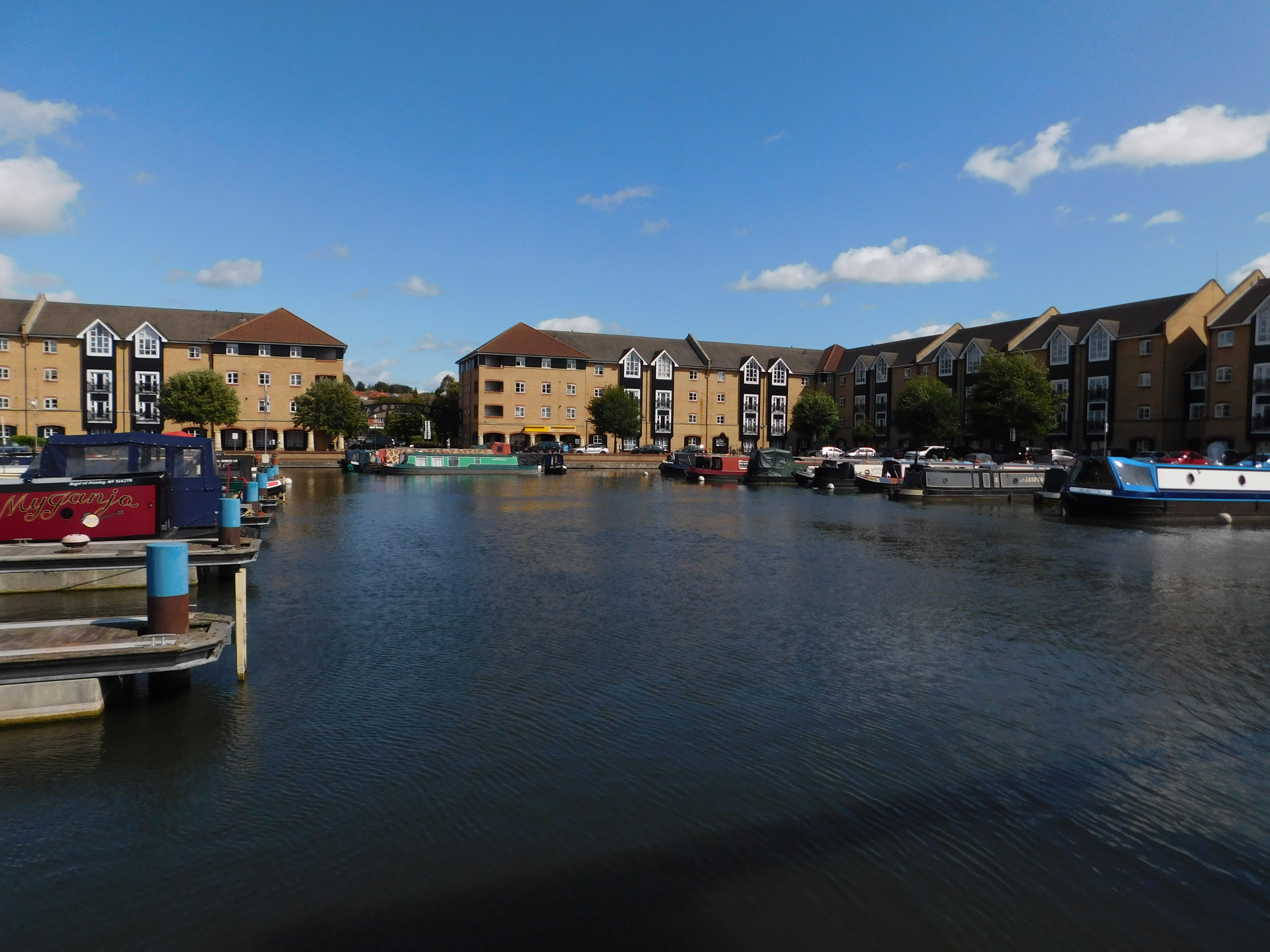
- Apsley Marina

- Location within Hertfordshire
- OS grid reference: TL0505
- District: Dacorum
- Shire county: Hertfordshire
- Region: East
- Country: England
- Sovereign state: United Kingdom
- Post town: HEMEL HEMPSTEAD
- Postcode district: HP3
- Dialling code: 01442
- Police: Hertfordshire
- Fire: Hertfordshire
- Ambulance: East of England
- UK Parliament: Hemel Hempstead

Apsley Marina, also referred to as Apsley Lock Marina, is a basin used for mooring narrowboats on the east side of the Grand Union Canal at Apsley, Hertfordshire, England.

== History ==
This former greenfield site is on the east side of the Grand Union Canal, immediately opposite to the former location of Apsley Mill. This was a flour mill on the west side of the canal, which was converted into a paper making factory in 1778, and then acquired by the papermaking inventor, John Dickinson, in 1809. Following a change in ownership, Apsley Mill ceased the manufacture of stationery in 1999.

The site was acquired by Fairview Homes in the late 1990s, as part of a project to redevelop both sides of the canal for housing. After much of the housing had been built and sold to householders, British Waterways took over ownership and management of the remaining land on the east side of the canal in November 2002. Following the completion of extensive excavation, earth-moving and civil engineering activities, the new marina opened to boats in 2003. A new public house named "The Paper Mill" was erected on the west side of the canal, and a footbridge, designed by Mark Lovell Design Engineers, was installed to connect the public house, on the west side of the canal, to the marina on the east side of the canal.

== Operations ==
The marina has 44 leisure berths for short-term customers and 20 residential berths for long-term customers. It is operated by Aquavista, formerly British Waterways Marinas Limited (BWML). Boat access to the Grand Union Canal is on the southwest side of the marina, through a lift bridge: a residential street, known as Dickinson Quay, runs along the other three sides of the marina.
