= Grovehill =

Area of Hemel Hempstead, Hertfordshire, England

Coordinates: 51.7526°N 0.4692°W

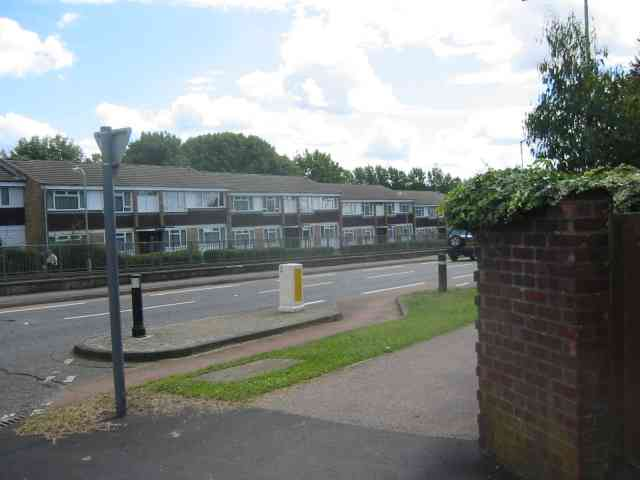
- Aycliffe Drive, Grovehill, showing typical housing

- Location within Hertfordshire
- OS grid reference: TL 056 071
- District: Dacorum
- Shire county: Hertfordshire
- Region: East
- Country: England
- Sovereign state: United Kingdom
- Post town: HEMEL HEMPSTEAD
- Postcode district: HP2
- Dialling code: 01442
- Police: Hertfordshire
- Fire: Hertfordshire
- Ambulance: East of England
- UK Parliament: Hemel Hempstead
- Website: https://grovehill.org.uk/

Grovehill is an area of Hemel Hempstead; it comprises two distinct developments. 'Precinct A' laid out and developed by the New Town Commission in 1967–68 and from the beginning a mixture of private and rented housing specifically intended to accommodate families of migrating management and professionals that a developing New Town required. This first development is situated at the Redbourn Road end of St. Agnells Lane, and takes in the self-build scheme already in progress at Wooton Drive in 1967/8, Crawley Drive to the Hammond Nursery, Infant and Junior School facing west on to Cambrian Way, and extending along the east side of Aycliffe Drive, and taking in the south side of Washington Avenue.

The second development, the large social housing estate at Grovehill West, began in 1972 and starts from the north side of Washington Avenue taking in: that part of St Agnells Lane north of Washington Avenue as far as Cupid Green Lane and continuing on to regain the upper end of the north side of Washington Avenue that meets Aycliffe Drive; the major sprawl of the development is west of Aycliffe Drive taking in Piccotts End Lane and beyond.

Henry Wells Square, containing the local shops, features a Tesco Express, Post Office, chemist, a pub, a Coral and a fish and chip shop. Grovehill is served by: Grovehill Community Centre (home to an internet cafe) and Grovehill Playing Fields, home to many football pitches, two baseball diamonds (home to Herts baseball club) and changing facilities and from 2011, an area of scrub land was converted into allotments. There are also various churches, a medical and a dental surgery as well as several schools including the original Grovehill School built by the New Town Commission (and renamed The Astley Cooper School at a later date).

Grovehill was part of the second wave of New Town development with building commencing in 1967. The large housing estate at Grovehill West started construction early in 1972 but took some years to complete due to the insolvency of the main contractors and was finally completed in the early 1980s.
