= Bennetts End =

Area of Hemel Hempstead, Hertfordshire, England

Coordinates: 51.742193°N 0.449064°W

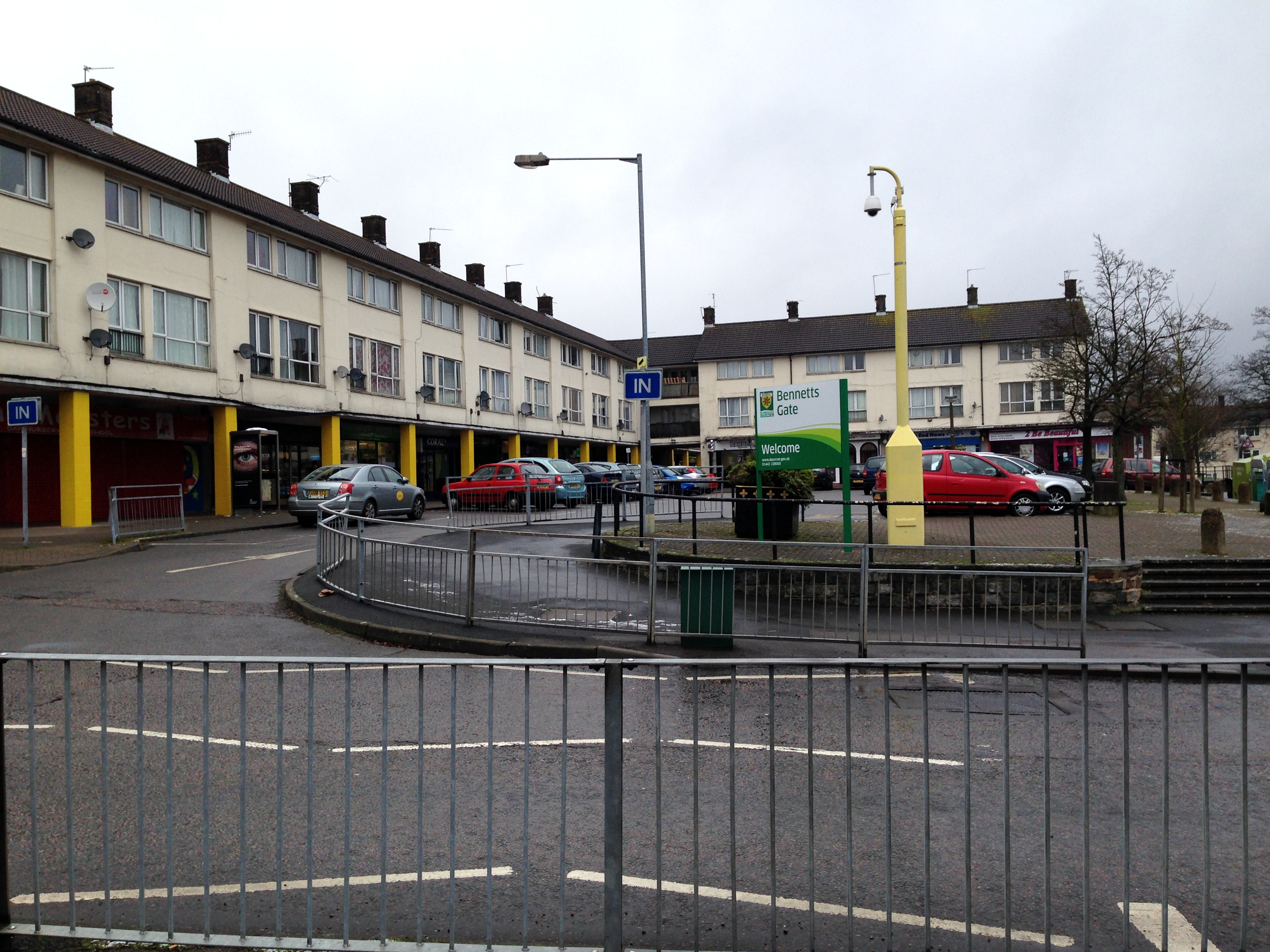
- Bennetts Gate Neighbourhood Shopping Centre

- Location within Hertfordshire
- Population: 5,904 (2011 Census. Dacourum Ward)
- OS grid reference: TL072059
- Shire county: Hertfordshire
- Region: East
- Country: England
- Sovereign state: United Kingdom
- Post town: Hemel Hempstead
- Postcode district: HP3
- Dialling code: 01442
- Police: Hertfordshire
- Fire: Hertfordshire
- Ambulance: East of England
- UK Parliament: Hemel Hempstead

Bennetts End is a neighbourhood within Hemel Hempstead in Hertfordshire, England. It is located in the southeast of the town and consists almost entirely of public housing built as part of the new town in the 1950s. It was the second neighbourhood to have construction commenced by the New Town corporation, after the nearby Adeyfield.

== History ==
The area was mostly farmland up until the construction of the new town. The name first appears as a farmstead owned by "Roger de Beneyet" around 1269. Old maps show Bennetts End Farm and Bennets End House as the only nineteenth-century buildings. A local industry, dating back to medieval times, was tile and brick making which used the local brickearth clay. This is particularly suitable for making bricks at the low temperatures achievable in wood fired kilns. Local street names " Tile Kiln Lane " and "Kiln Ground" remember this activity. The area has many dells, hollows in the ground dug out by the brickmakers or by farmers seeking the deeper chalk to spread on their land and make them more fertile.

Just before the First World War, Bennetts End was chosen as the location for Hemel Hempstead's isolation hospital, construction of which commenced in 1914. The hospital, on St Albans Hill had a total of 45 beds, and was used to isolate patients with infectious diseases until its closure in 1952.

Hemel Hempstead officially became a New Town on 4 February 1947. The initial plans for the New Town were drawn up by architect G. A. Jellicoe. Bennetts End was the second district to commence construction which began in 1951 and by autumn 1952 300 houses were occupied. The architect who planned its 821 acres (332 hectares) was Judith Ledeboer. Consideration was made to keep it separate from existing areas such as Corner Hall with open public space.

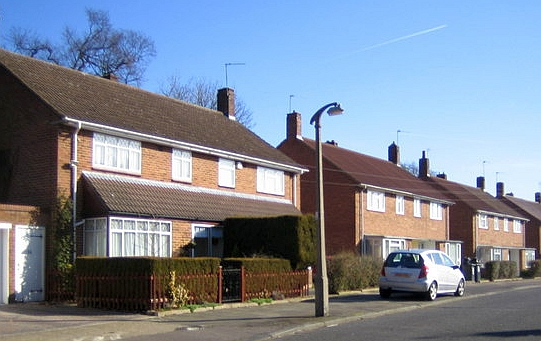
Post war new town housing in Bennetts End

== Amenities ==
A feature of the new town was a number of local neighbourhood shopping centres in addition to the main town centre. In Bennetts End this became the Bennetts Gate shopping centre, which faces competition from several major retail outlets in the town centre. The first shops opened at the Bennetts Gate shopping centre in 1954; until then, mobile vans served the district. A purpose-built pub, 'The Golden Cockerel' was also opened in 1954. A smaller parade of shops at the bottom of Barnacres Road called 'The Denes' opened in 1955. Housing is mostly brick built two and three-bedroom terraced houses. The notable curved terrace called Long John, designed by Geoffry Jellicoe and partners has a hint of Georgian style.

The secondary school serving the area is Longdean School, formed in 1970 from Apsley Grammar School and Bennett's End Secondary Modern School. There are several primary schools.

There was a dry ski slope in Bennetts End for many years. This has been replaced by The Snow Centre an Indoor skiing centre in 2009. The structural design engineer for The Snow Centre was the serving Bennetts End Councillor, Suqlain Mahmood.
