= Highfield, Hertfordshire =

Area of Hemel Hempstead, Hertfordshire, England

Coordinates: 51.765062°N 0.458135°W

Highfield
- Location within Hertfordshire
- OS grid reference: TL065085
- District: Dacorum
- Shire county: Hertfordshire
- Region: East
- Country: England
- Sovereign state: United Kingdom
- Post town: Hemel Hempstead
- Postcode district: HP2
- Dialling code: 01442
- Police: Hertfordshire
- Fire: Hertfordshire
- Ambulance: East of England
- UK Parliament: Hemel Hempstead

Highfield is a neighbourhood district in Hemel Hempstead, Hertfordshire, United Kingdom. It was constructed on a green field site as part of the construction of the postwar newtown expansion of Hemel Hempstead. It is located north of the old town centre. It is most likely named from Highfield House which still exists, although ultimately derived from an old field name which reflects the altitude of the district which reaches 469 feet above sea level.

== History ==
A well-preserved burial mound is located near the junction of Queensway and High Street Green. Prior to recent tidying of the site, there was a plaque reading "'TUMULUS' Within this enclosure, is a Round Barrow or Burial Mound from the early Bronze Age Circa 1700 BC". But this has been removed, and the site is now understood to be a Roman, or Romano-British burial mound.

Old maps show the pre development area to have been agricultural with some small-scale brick making.

It was the sixth new town district to begin construction with work starting in 1959. It was largely complete by 1966. A former branch railway line that linked Hemel Hempstead with nearby Harpenden, called the Nicky Line runs through the district. This is now closed and forms a long-distance foot and cycle path.

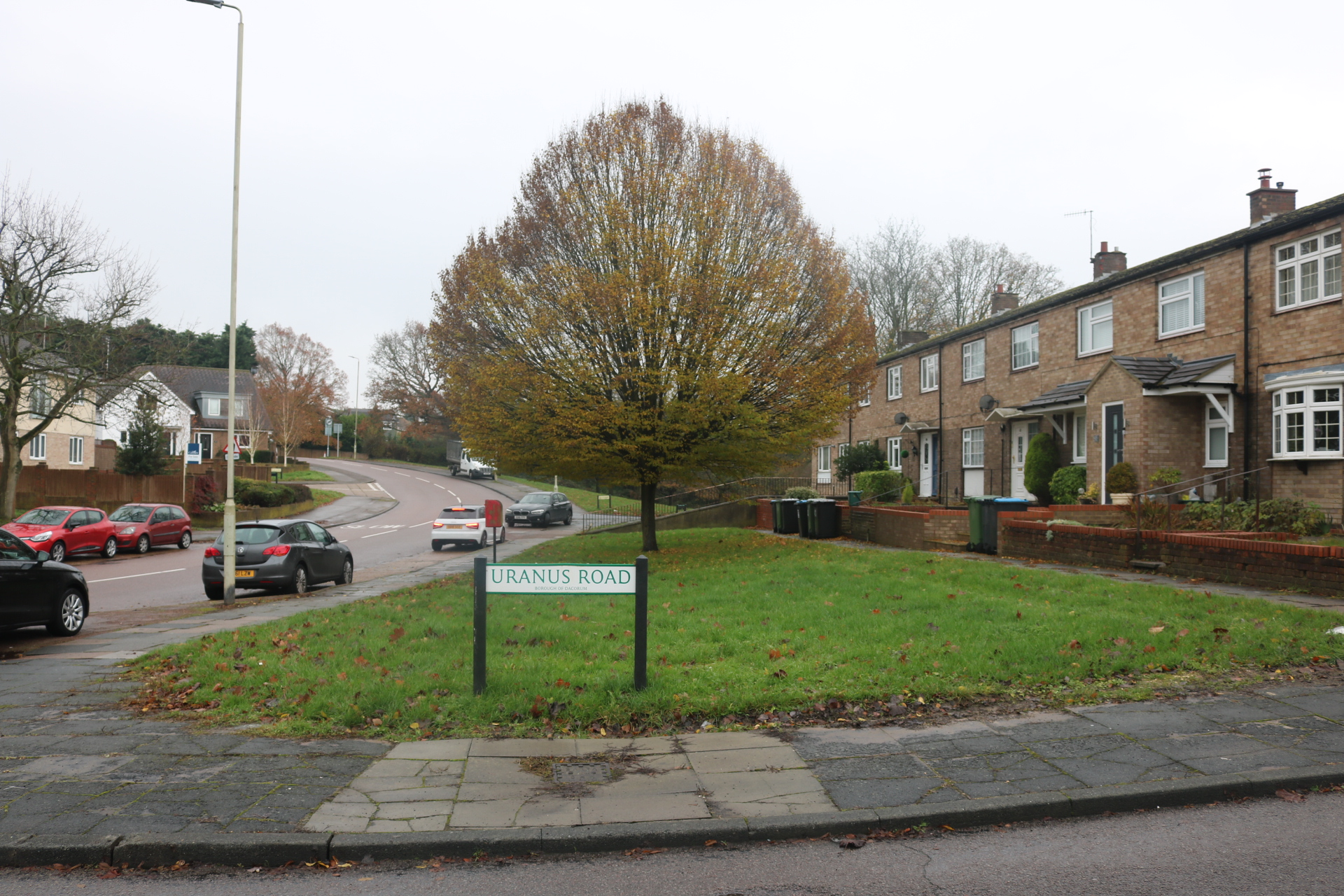
Street sign for Uranus Road in a part of Highfield known as ''The Planets''

Like other neighbourhoods in the new town, it is centered on a local shopping centre called 'The Heights', which opened in 1962. There is a new town designed pub called The Royal Stag opened in 1964 (shut in 2015 to make way for a new Tesco) close by a second shopping parade called 'Bellgate'. This is named after a former pub which predated the new town, called the 'Bellgate Inn' further down the Redbourne Road (now Allandale; corner of St Mary's Road, formerly Bell Road; WillCW); the pub is now called 'The Old Bell Gate' just as 'The Bell' in the High Street is now 'The Old Bell'.

Many street names in the district have a distinctive astronomical connection, thus, Jupiter Drive, Neptune Drive, Apollo Way, Uranus Road, Pluto Rise, Saturn Way, Mercury Walk and Martian Avenue. This part of the district is nicknamed "The Planets".
