= Kings Langley Priory =

Former priory in Herefordshire, England

- Remaining building from the Medieval priory

- Location within Hertfordshire
- 51.7130°N 0.4603°W
- Location: Kings Langley, Hertfordshire

History
- Built: 14th century

Site notes
- Architectural style: Medieval style

Listed Building – Grade II*
- Official name: Priory Remains (Now Part of the New School) And Attached Buildings
- Designated: 22 October 1952
- Reference no.: 1348439

Kings Langley Priory was a Dominican priory in Kings Langley, Hertfordshire, England. It was located adjacent to the Kings Langley Royal Palace, residence of the Plantagenet English kings. The remains of the priory form a Grade II* Listed Building.

== History ==
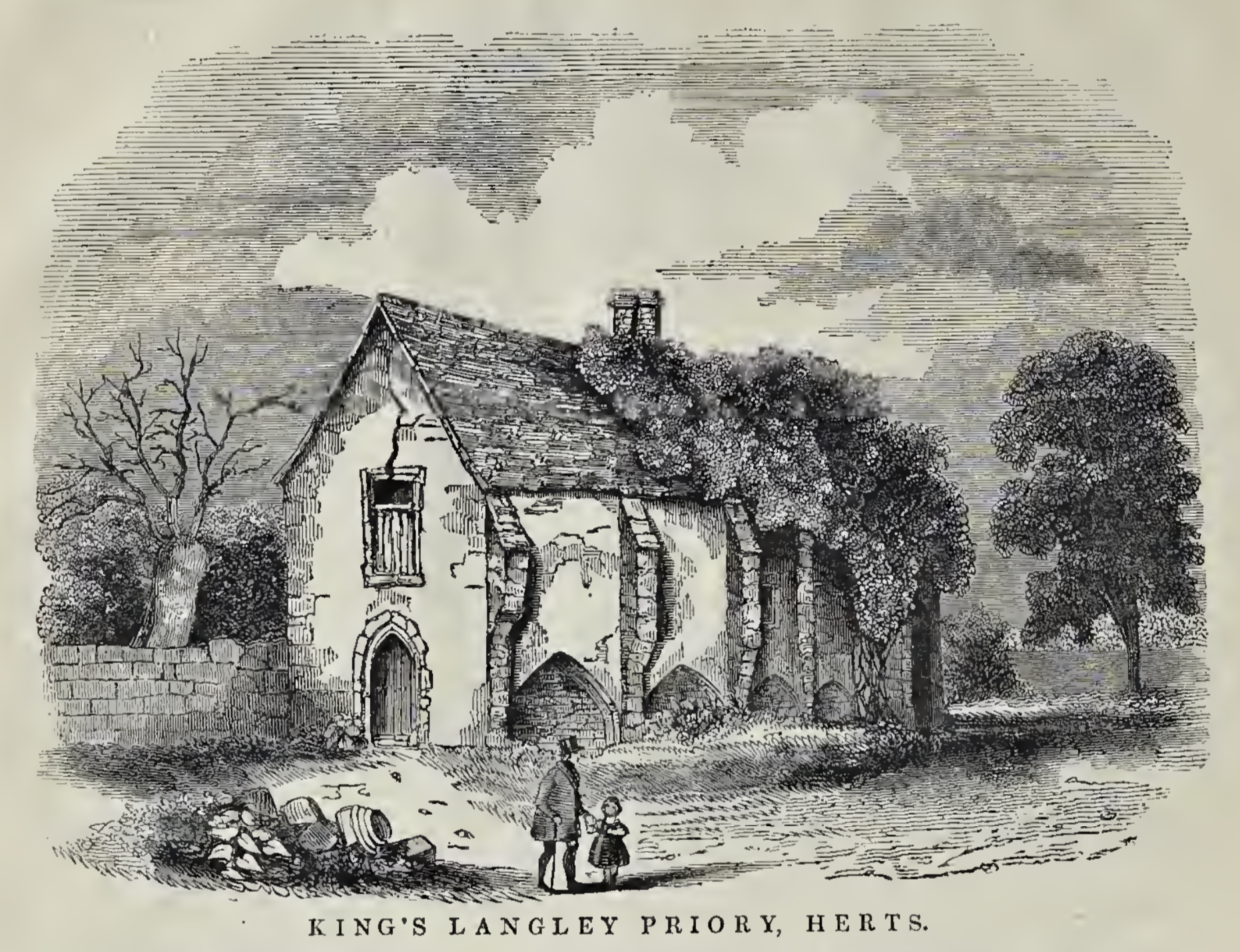
Kings Langley Priory depicted in 1844

=== Established ===
The priory was founded by Edward II in fulfilment of a vow made when in peril in 1308. He awarded the brothers a grant of £100 a year, and also gave them land there for building, and assigned to them as a dwelling known as "Little London" until the priory could be built. In March 1312, the king gave the brothers 700 marks for building expenses, and in the summer of that year the conventual church was dedicated and a cemetery consecrated. Possibly, however, the church was not yet finished, for the body of Piers Gaveston, who was killed about this time, was not buried there until the end of 1314, when the ceremony took place, the Archbishop of Canterbury and four bishops as well as many other ecclesiastics taking part in the funeral rites. In October 1311 the king increased the annual grant to £150 to provide for fifteen friars added since the foundation.

Edward III seems to have been equally interested in the priory as his father had been. In 1346 he granted the friars part of a quarry for building purposes. In 1349, a house of Dominican sisters was founded at Dartford in Kent, which was regarded as the complement of the Dominican friary at Kings Langley.

In October 1376, Edward III made over to John Duke of Lancaster, Simon Sudbury, Archbishop of Canterbury, and others in trust for the convent at Langley, the hundred and manor of Preston and various other manors for forty years, with the idea that during this term they might be secured to them in frankalmoin. The convent let them to Simon de Burley, who shortly afterwards received a grant of them in fee simple from Richard II.

When Richard died in February 1400 he was at first buried at Langley Priory; afterwards, however, his body was removed by order of Henry V to Westminster Abbey. But the conventual church of Langley still retained a sign of the priory's connexion with the royal family in the tomb of Edmund of Langley, Duke of York, interred here in 1402 beside his wife, Isabella, the daughter of Peter, King of Castile.

Henry IV in 1399 and Henry V in 1413 confirmed the grants made to the friars. The prior and convent obtained the ratification of their charters from Henry VI in 1424, Edward IV in 1466, Henry VII in 1486, and in 1510 from Henry VIII.

=== Refounded ===
The priory of Kings Langley was refounded by Philip and Mary in June 1557 as a house of Dominican sisters, at the request, and for the benefit of seven nuns, formerly at Ingress Abbey, Dartford, Kent. The prioress and convent were declared a corporate body, having perpetual succession and power to acquire property and to sue and be sued at law. They were given the house and site of the late friary, the land called 'le Courte Wike' in Kings Langley which had belonged to the priory, and a house and buildings within 'the old manor' lying near the pales of the royal park.

On 8 September 1558 the king and queen granted to the Prioress and convent of Langley the reversion of certain tenements in Dartford, formerly demesne lands of the nuns of that place, and until the expiration of the lease, the rent of £30 7s. 7d. They gave also, besides other demesne lands, the house of the late nunnery with the property in Dartford assigned after its suppression to Anne of Cleves, and it has been supposed that the nuns now returned to Dartford. The nuns were able to sell the lead from the Priory roofs at Kings Langley to the building works ongoing at Windsor Castle.

The convent's existence was very short. Queen Mary died in November of that year, and by an Act passed in Elizabeth's first Parliament all restorations or foundations of monasteries since the death of Edward VI were made void, and their possessions given to the Crown. In 1575, the tomb of Edmund of Langley was moved to All Saints' Church nearby.

=== Present ownership ===
Early in the 20th century the property came into the ownership of Margaret Cross, who adapted it for use as a school. It is now united with the adjoining property, the site of Kings Langley Palace, in the ownership of the Rudolf Steiner School Kings Langley, which was closed in March 2019.

== Other burials ==
- Anne de Mortimer
- Piers Gaveston, 1st Earl of Cornwall
- Thomas Plantagenet, twelfth child of King Edward III
- Ralph Stafford (died 1385)

== Priors of Kings Langley ==
Elizabeth Cressener was the only prioress of Langley. Priors of Kings Langley were:

- John de Warefeld, 1308–15
- Robert de Duffeld, appointed 1315, occurs October 1316 and 1319
- Roger de Woderowe, occurs 1329 and 1340
- John de Dunstable, died c. 1343
- John Woderowe, occurs 9 June 1356
- Thomas Walsh, occurs 1374
- John, occurs October 1384
- William Syward, occurs January 1394-5
- Philip Boydon, occurs 1426
- John Henle, removed before May 1427
- John de Hunden, D.D., resigned in 1458 on becoming Bishop of Llandaff
- William Wignale, S.T.D., occurs 16 July 1458
- Thomas Welles, occurs 14 July 1466
- Richard Wycherley, resigned on becoming Bishop of 'Olivence '
- Thomas Powel or Poynes, occurs 1494 c. 1498
- Richard Wycherley, Bishop of 'Olivence,' appointed 1498-9, died c. 1502-3
- Robert, occurs c. 1502-3
- Thomas Cowper, S.T.B., occurs 1519
- Robert Mylys or Miles, occurs 1522
- Richard Yngworth, S.T.P., occurs 1530 and December 1537

== Common seals ==
A 15th-century seal of the house, in shape a pointed oval, bears a representation of the Annunciation in a niche of very elaborate design, below which the royal founder kneels in prayer. On either side of him is a shield not of the arms of Edward II, but of France and England. Of the legend only two letters survive.

A later seal, also a pointed oval, represents the Christian God in majesty. In the base, under a carved four-centred arch, is the king as in the earlier seal. The inner border is engrailed. Legend: SIGILLUM : COVUNE : FRATRUM : PREDIB : DE : LANGELEYE.

A 16th-century seal, of the same shape but slightly larger, shows the coronation of the Virgin in a niche with two-arched canopy. On each side there is a smaller canopied niche; the one on the left containing St. Margaret, crowned, standing on the dragon, which she pierces with a long cross, and holding in her right hand a book; in that on the right is an archbishop with mitre and crozier. Below is the founder on his knees under a carved roundheaded arch; he holds a church and in front of him on the ground is his crown. Legend: . . . . VENT . MONAST'II DE LAN . . Y. The counterseal shows two impressions of a shield-shaped signet with arms, a bend engrailed between six fleurs de lis with three crosslets fitchy on the bend, the ownership of which is unknown.

== See also ==
- List of monastic houses in East Sussex

== Notes ==
- This article is based on King's Langley Priory, in The Victoria History of the County of Hertford: Volume 4, 1971, a publication in the public domain.
