= Kings Langley School =

Location
- Love Lane; Kings Langley, Hertfordshire, WD4 9HN; England; 51°42′57″N 0°27′46″W

Information
- Type: Academy
- Motto: Unlocking Potential For Life
- Established: 1 December 2012
- Department for Education URN: 139036 Tables
- Ofsted: Reports
- Head teacher: David Fisher
- Staff: Over 100
- Gender: Coeducational
- Age: 11 to 18
- Enrolment: 1300
- Website: https://www.kls.herts.sch.uk

Kings Langley School is a coeducational secondary school and sixth form with academy status, located in the village of Kings Langley in Hertfordshire, England. It is situated on Love Lane about 0.75 miles (1.21 km) from Junction 20 on the M25 and about 0.5 miles (0.80 km) from Kings Langley railway station.

The school has pupils aged 11 to 18. Its traditional catchment area is between the nearby towns of Watford and Hemel Hempstead. Most students are from Kings Langley and around or in the neighbouring villages of Bovingdon, Abbots Langley, and Chipperfield.

The school became one of the first batch of schools to benefit from the governments PFI re-build scheme in 2012, and was completely re-built in September 2016.

The school was among the top 20 most improved secondary schools in England for GCSE results over the 2004–2007 period.

== Notable former pupils ==
- Anthony Joshua, London 2012 Olympics, Super Heavyweight Boxing Gold Medalist, Unified Heavyweight Champion of the World
