= Rudolf Steiner School Kings Langley =

Defunct school in Hertfordshire, England

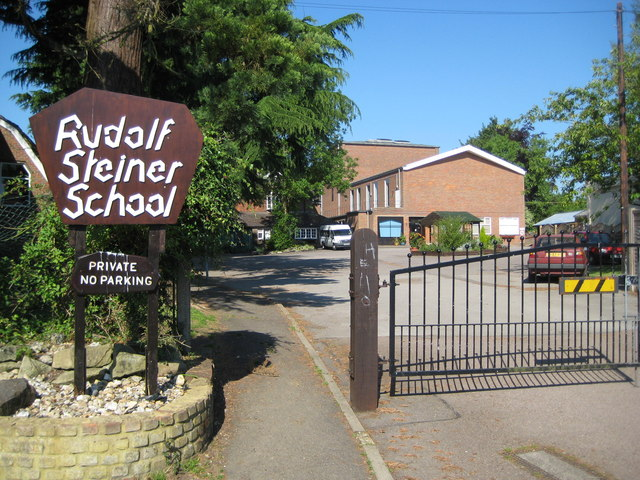
- Main gate of the school

Location
- Langley Hill; Kings Langley, Hertfordshire; England; 51°42′43″N 0°27′32″W

Information
- Type: Independent school
- Established: 1949
- Closed: 29 March 2019
- Local authority: Hertfordshire
- Age: 3 to 19

Rudolf Steiner School Kings Langley was an independent Steiner school in Kings Langley, Hertfordshire, England. It educated pupils aged 3 to 19 and closed on 29 March 2019.

The School was set on 10 acres (4.0 ha) of grounds, on the site of Kings Langley Palace, a 13th-century Plantagenet royal palace.

In July 2017 the Department for Education (DfE) issued an order of de-registration of the school. This followed earlier concerns over child safeguarding resulting in a March 2017 instruction from the DfE to not admit new students.

An appeal of the de-registration order on behalf of the school failed, and the school closed on 29 March 2019.

== History ==
The school occupied grounds associated with the sites of both the medieval Dominican Priory of Kings Langley and Kings Langley Palace.

A private school had operated on the site since about 1909 under the names Coombe Hill School and later Priory School. Its headmistress, Margaret Cross, became interested in progressive education and attended a course led by Rudolf Steiner in 1921. Steiner visited the school in April 1922, after which elements of his educational approach, including biodynamic gardening and eurythmy, were introduced into the curriculum.

In 1949 the school was reorganised as the New School and became fully committed to Steiner education. The main school block was constructed in stages between 1955 and 1975; the dining room and theatre were added in 1969–71, the sports hall in 1970, the kindergarten in 1966, and the pottery building in 1991.

== Education system ==
The school followed the Steiner (Waldorf) curriculum.

== Inspections, safeguarding concerns and closure ==
The school was inspected by the School Inspection Service (SIS) and later by Ofsted. SIS listed the school as a Steiner school for pupils aged 3 to 19.

Inspection findings became increasingly critical between 2015 and 2016. In March 2015, SIS reported that risk assessments had not been adequately maintained and updated. In a later unannounced inspection in November 2015, inspectors said that the school had not investigated "either fully or impartially important matters that were raised by parents nor considered them in the broader context of risk to children".

Ofsted subsequently inspected the school. A 2016 inspection found serious weaknesses in safeguarding, stating that although pupils said that they were safe, "they are not, because of flaws in the school’s systems and procedures for safeguarding and child protection". A later 2016 inspection found the school inadequate in four areas and stated that "the arrangements for safeguarding are not effective".

On 9 March 2017 the Secretary of State for Education directed the school to stop admitting new pupils. The Department for Education later moved to deregister the school, and it closed on 29 March 2019.

== Misconduct proceedings involving a former teacher ==
In 2019 the Teaching Regulation Agency published the outcome of a professional conduct hearing concerning former teacher Denis McCarthy, who had taught at the school for 34 years.

The panel decision recorded that, between 2009 and 2016, concerns had repeatedly been raised by parents about McCarthy's conduct, including physical contact with pupils and the appropriateness of language used in one lesson. The panel found proven allegations that he had failed to maintain appropriate professional boundaries and standards in relation to six pupils, and imposed an indefinite prohibition order.

Press coverage of the hearing reported allegations of a school culture in which boundaries between staff and pupils had become blurred, including evidence alleging that some teachers regarded close physical familiarity as acceptable.

== See also ==
- Waldorf education
- Kings Langley Palace
- Kings Langley Priory
