= Kings Langley =

Village and civil parish in Hertfordshire, England

Coordinates: 51.71559°N 0.45692°W

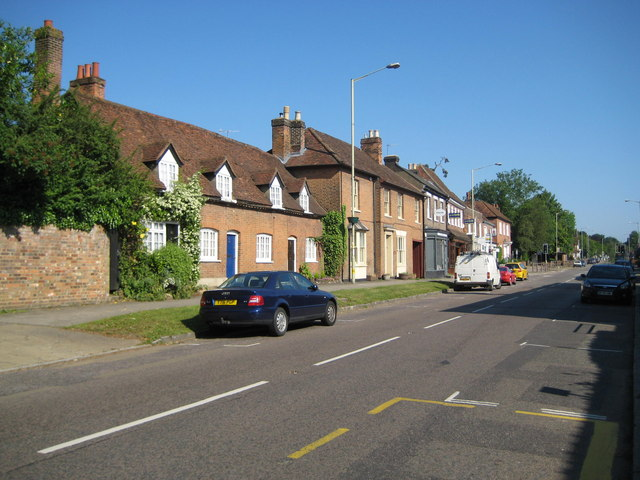
- Kings Langley High Street, looking north.

- Location within Hertfordshire
- Population: 5,072 (Census 2001); 5,214 (Census 2011)
- OS grid reference: TL067030
- District: Dacorum
- Shire county: Hertfordshire
- Region: East
- Country: England
- Sovereign state: United Kingdom
- Post town: KINGS LANGLEY
- Postcode district: WD4
- Dialling code: 01923
- Police: Hertfordshire
- Fire: Hertfordshire
- Ambulance: East of England
- UK Parliament: South West Hertfordshire

Kings Langley is a village, former manor and civil parish in Hertfordshire, England. It is sited 23.5 miles (37.8 kilometres) north-west of London and to the south of the Chiltern Hills; it now forms part of the London commuter belt. The village is divided between two local government districts by the River Gade with the larger western portion in the Borough of Dacorum and smaller part, to the east of the river, in Three Rivers District. It was the location of Kings Langley Palace and the associated Kings Langley Priory, of which few traces survive.

It is situated 2 mi (3 km) south of Hemel Hempstead and 2 mi (3 km) north of Watford.

The manor is first mentioned in surviving records as æt Langalege (Old English æt Langeleage) in a Saxon charter dated 1042–1049. It appears as Langelai in the Domesday Book (1086) and as Langel' Regis (“Langley of the King”) in 1254. The name means “long wood or clearing”. From the 11th to the 14th centuries the settlement is often recorded as “Chilterns Langley” to distinguish it from Abbots Langley; with increased royal involvement it is attested by 1346 as “Kyngeslangley” and by 1428 as “Langele Regis”.

== History ==
Archaeological evidence indicates continuous human activity in the Kings Langley area from the Lower Palaeolithic period.

A Roman villa of the winged-corridor type, dated to the 2nd century AD, stood in the southern part of the present village, just east of the River Gade, between what is now the Roman Gardens housing estate and Home Park Industrial Estate, probably overlying an earlier 1st-century elite Catuvellauni residence. The site was first identified in 1825 during works for Kings Langley railway station, and was later largely excavated between June 1981 and March 1982. Identified features included a bath suite and hypocaust heating.

The earliest known written reference to the manor of Langley dates to the 1040s, when the Saxon thegn Æthelwine Niger granted the land to Leofstan, abbot of St Albans Abbey. Leofstan subsequently granted the western portion of the district to a knight named Turcoht, an act which may have led to the later division between Kings Langley and Abbots Langley.

By 1066 the manor had been lost to the abbey and was held by Saeric and Thori as vassals of Leofwine Godwinson (c. 1035–1066). Following the Norman Conquest, the manor formed part of the Hundred of Danish and was among the lands granted to Robert, Count of Mortain (c. 1031–c. 1095), uterine half-brother of William the Conqueror (c. 1028–1087); his tenant was a certain Ralf. The assessed value declined from £8 in 1066 to £2 in 1086, a reduction likely caused by post-Conquest disruption. The present village developed as a linear village along the old road from London to Berkhamsted and beyond to the Midlands.

Following the forfeiture of William, Count of Mortain (before 1084–after 1140) after his failed rebellion in 1106, the manor was granted to the Chenduit family as part of the Honour of Berkhamsted. The Gesta Abbatum reports that Paul (abbot 1077–1093), abbot of St Albans Abbey, recovered Kings Langley for the abbey in the late 11th century; however, the Chenduit family retained control of the manor as vassals of the Crown, suggesting either a short-lived recovery or a reassertion of specific ecclesiastical rights.

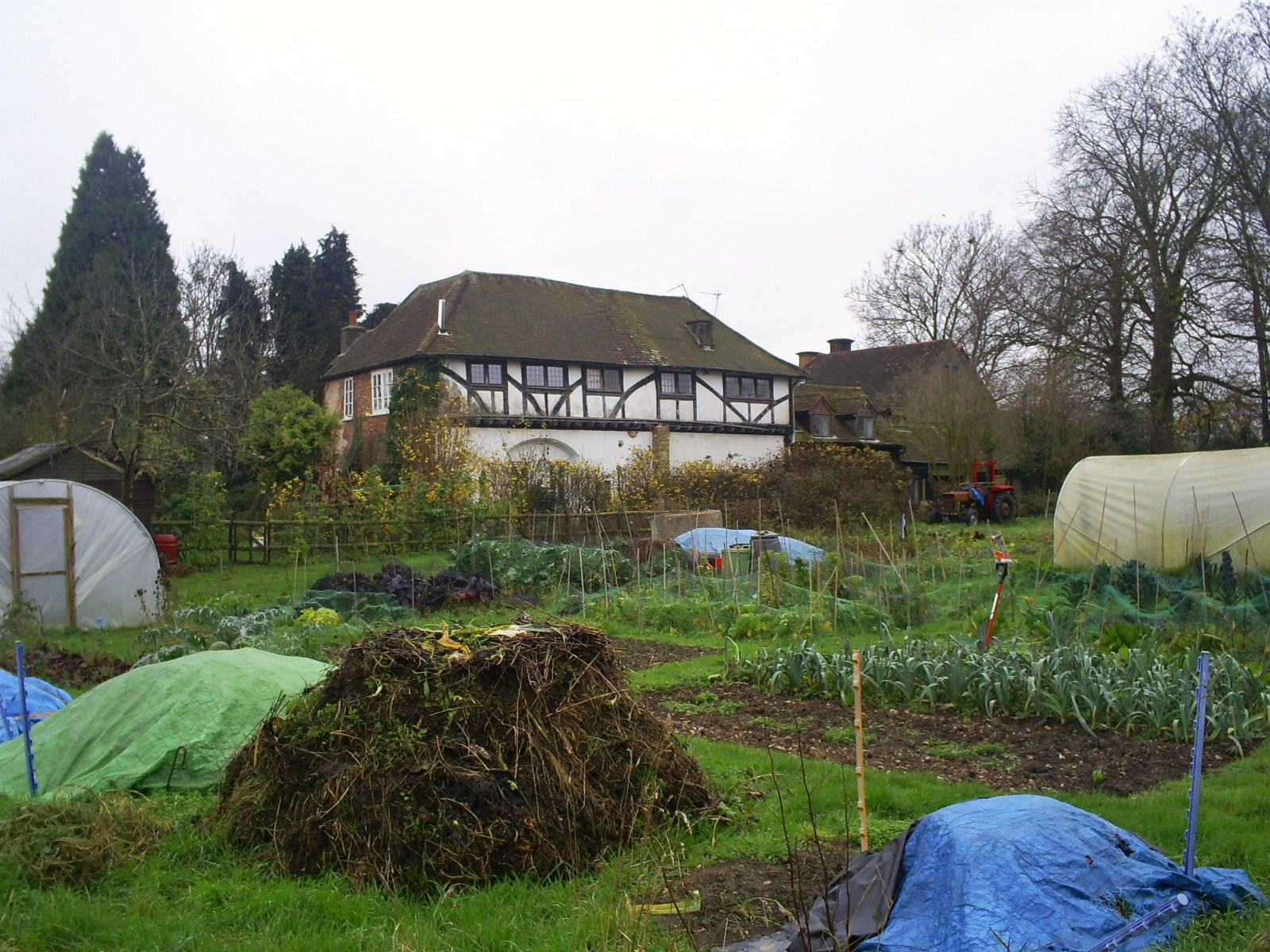
Biodynamic allotments and building of Tudor origin on the grounds of Kings Langley Priory established by Edward II in 1308

By the 1270s Sir Stephen de Chenduit (before 1235–after 1278) had fallen into debt, and the manor was acquired by Eleanor of Castile (1241–1290), queen consort of Edward I (1239–1307). Shortly afterwards a royal palace was developed to the west of the village on Le Corte Hill (now Langley Hill), with a deer park extending to the south. It is unclear whether this represented a new foundation or an enlargement of an earlier complex. Edward III (1312–1377) later held court at Kings Langley during the Black Death to avoid London, and the village briefly served as a seat of government.

Kings Langley Priory, a Dominican house, was founded in 1308 by Edward II (1284–1327) adjacent to the royal palace. Both the palace and the priory church fell into ruin after the Dissolution of the Monasteries, although elements of each site survive. Piers Gaveston, 1st Earl of Cornwall (c. 1284–1312), the favourite of Edward II, was interred with "great ceremony" in the priory church. Having been summarily executed without trial in Warwickshire in June 1312, his burial had to be deferred since he had been excommunicated by Robert Winchelsey, Archbishop of Canterbury earlier that year. He was buried on 2 January 1315, after Edward obtained him absolution. The exact location of his remains is unknown. Following his deposition on 30 September 1399, Richard II (1367–1400) died in captivity, probably of starvation, at Pontefract Castle. After his body was displayed at St Paul's Cathedral, he was interred in the priory church on 6 March 1401; on 4 December 1413 his remains were removed and taken to Westminster Abbey. Other notable burials at the priory included the fourth surviving son of Edward III, Edmund of Langley, 1st Duke of York (1341–1402), who was born at the palace. Ralph Stafford (c. 1367–1385), a knight in the household of Richard II, and Anne de Mortimer (1388–1411), an ancestor of the House of York and grandmother of Edward IV (1442–1483) and Richard III (1452–1485).

The All Saints' Church was built in the 14th century on the site of an earlier church. The tomb of Edmund of Langley was moved there following the Dissolution of the Priory (c.1539) and placed in a specially built north-east chapel in 1878.

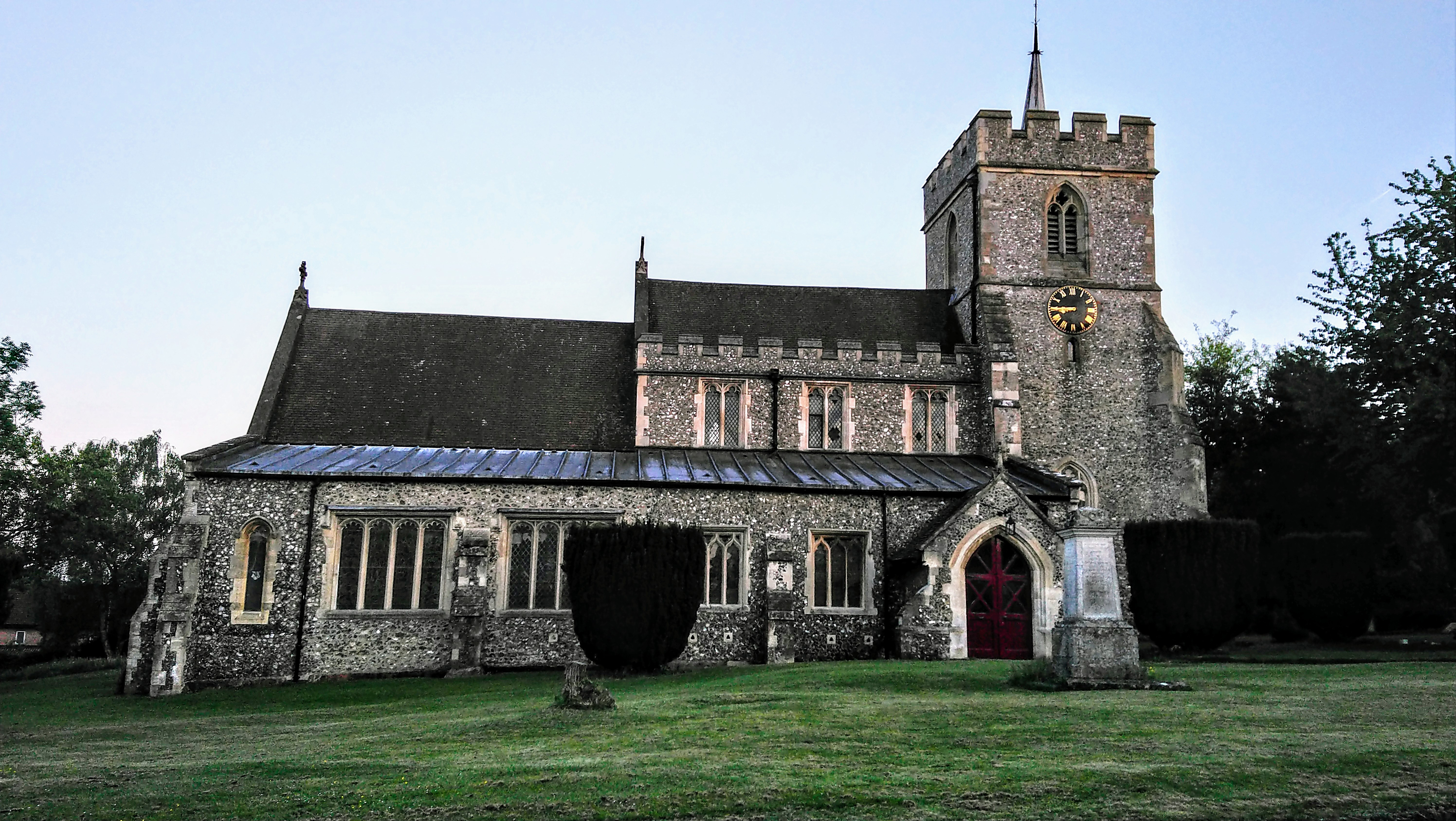
All Saints' Church, Kings Langley

The 18th century Sparrows Herne turnpike road (later the A41 trunk road) traversed the Chilterns via the valley of the River Gade and ran down the village high street. The 16th century Saracen's Head public house is a coaching inn which flourished in this period.

The Grand Union Canal dates from 1797 and the London and Birmingham Railway from 1838 which later became the West Coast Main Line, the main railway line from London to the north west. The canal and railway line pass just east of the village at Kings Langley railway station.

There are many businesses located near the station in Home Park Industrial Estate which was also the site of the Construction and Engineering Centre of West Herts College from 2007–2019, when it was moved to Hemel Hempstead.

Housing developments in the 20th century have led to the village spreading out on either side of the main road. The A41 has now been diverted west of the village leaving the high street to local traffic for the first time in centuries.

During the Second World War, Barnes Lodge, a former country house located off Hempstead Road near Rucklers Lane, served as the principal radio communications centre linking the Polish Underground (Armia Krajowa) in occupied Poland with the Polish government-in-exile and its military staff in London. It worked in close coordination with the Polish Section of the Special Operations Executive. The house was demolished in c. 1976, and the present building, retaining the name Barnes Lodge, was constructed on the site of its former stables.

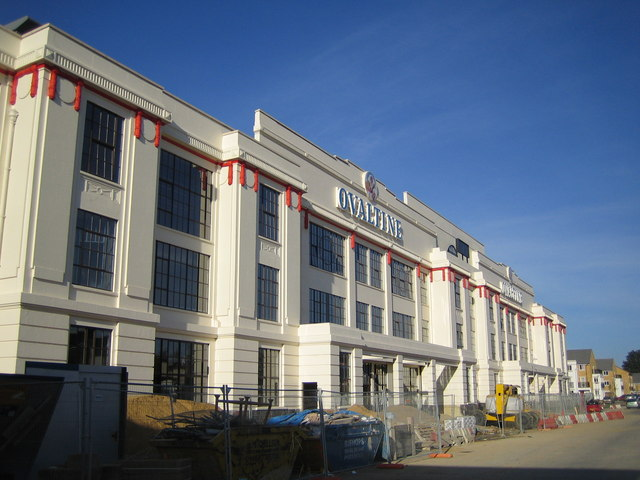
Former Ovaltine factory, Kings Langley. This is the listed art deco façade of the former Ovaltine factory. It was redeveloped into housing in 2002.

Kings Langley was the site of the factory making Ovaltine chocolate drink; the listed factory facade, designed c. 1923 by James Albert Bowden is now all that is left and still stands alongside the railway line among a new housing development. The Ovaltine factory itself has been converted into a series of flats and duplexes.

The former Ovaltine Egg Farm was converted into energy-efficient offices which house Renewable Energy Systems. The complex incorporates a highly visible 225 kW Vestas V29 wind turbine, nicknamed "Lofty" alongside the M25.

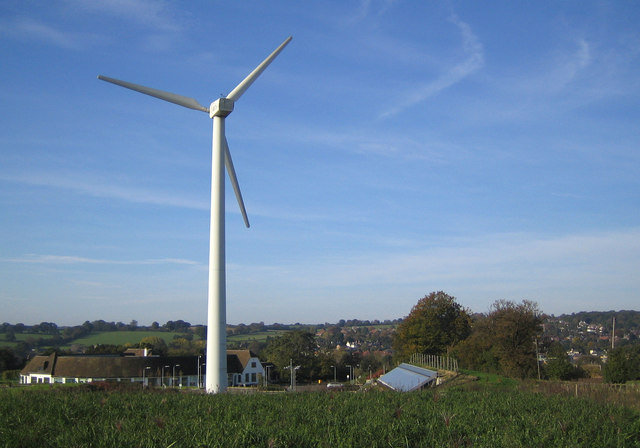
The wind turbine overlooking the former Ovaltine Model Dairy Farm, now the offices of Renewable Energy Systems Ltd.

Kings Langley School is the local comprehensive school, situated on Love Lane to the west of the village.

Kings Langley was also the site of a Waldorf School, the Rudolf Steiner School Kings Langley which closed in 2019. This was built on the grounds of the old palace. There was a small display cabinet of finds from the palace period in the school entrance foyer.

The village became twinned with Achiet-le-Grand in France in November 2009, in honour of Christopher Cox from the village who won a Victoria Cross in fighting near Achiet-le-Grand in the First World War.

== Transport ==
Kings Langley railway station is a stop on the West Coast Main Line. London Northwestern Railway operates a regular service between London Euston and Milton Keynes Central.

The M25 London Orbital motorway passes just south of the village on an imposing viaduct across the River Gade valley. To the north of junction 20 with the A41, a dual-carriageway bypasses Kings Langley and continues to the south of Tring where it flows into the original motorway-standard by-pass. The old route through Kings Langley is now classified the A4251.

== Rucklers Lane ==
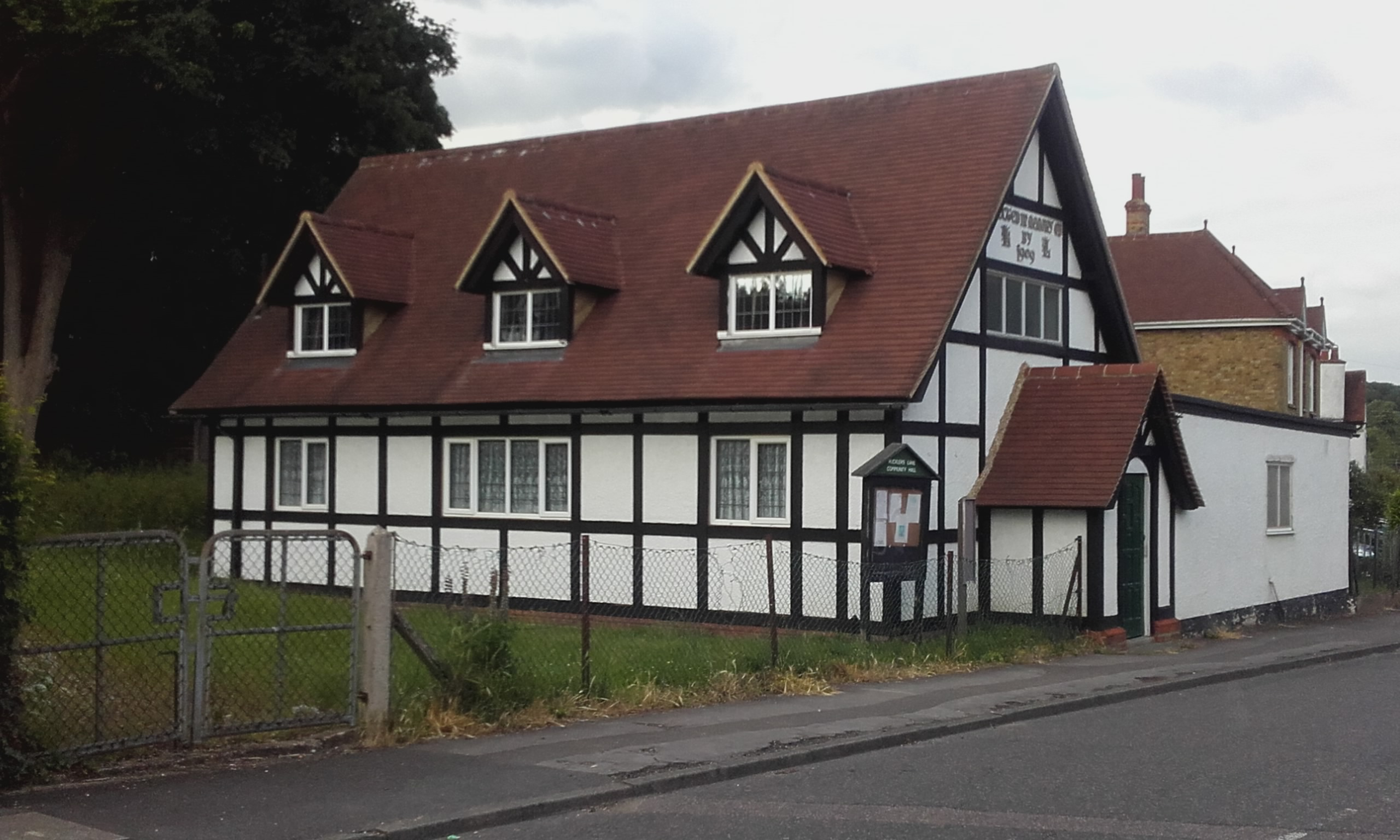
The Rucklers Lane Community Hall was built for the workers of nearby Shendish Manor in 1909 as a memorial to Arthur Longman, the owner of the estate

Just to the north of Kings Langley is a small village called Rucklers Lane, named after the road it is built on. The origin of the settlement in the early 20th century was the construction of a number of mock tudor houses for the workers on the nearby Shendish Manor estate. A community hall was also built for the workers in 1909 as a memorial to Arthur Longman, the owner of the estate; it was originally intended as a chapel of ease to avoid the long walk to the parish church. Further west along the lane is Phasels Wood Scout Camp and Activity Centre which opened in 1937.

== Mentions in literature ==
- William Shakespeare's Richard II (1595), Act III, Scene IV, is set in the garden of the palace at Langley.
- Emily Sarah Holt's novel The White Rose of Langley (1875) has many scenes in the palace. (Download available at Project Gutenberg)
- In the 2010 book Beautiful Darkness the character Olivia Durand is from Kings Langley.
- Mentioned by housekeeper Mrs Swabb in the 1973 play Habeas Corpus written by Alan Bennett

== Sport ==
=== Football ===
Kings Langley FC, as of 2023/2024, play in the Division 1 (Central) Division of the Southern Football League.

=== Cricket ===
Kings Langley CC currently play in Divisions 2B, Division 7 West and Division 10 South, of the Saracens Hertfordshire Cricket League.

=== Bowls ===
Kings Langley Bowls Club is situated in Green Park at the end of the Nap car park. It is a popular lawn bowls club with club and district competitions for bowlers of all abilities. It includes a club house with licensed bar and good social programs.

== Notable people ==
- Ancestors of U.S. President Jimmy Carter (1924-2024) with the Carter surname lived in village 1361–1588
- Christopher Augustus Cox VC (1889–1959), soldier decorated for working as a stretcher bearer under heavy fire in France, 1917
- Edmund of Langley, 1st Duke of York (1341–1402), the fourth surviving son of King Edward III of England and Philippa of Hainault and the founder of the House of York
- Alan Rice-Oxley (1898–1961), RAF officer, First World War fighter ace
- Griff (born 2001), singer and songwriter
- Benny Green (1927–1998), saxophonist and radio personality
- Bruce Grocott, Baron Grocott (b. 1940), former Labour MP for The Wrekin and Telford and current Chancellor of the University of Leicester
- Graham Taylor (1944–2017), former England football manager and former manager and chairman of Watford F.C.
- Luke Donald (b. 1977), professional golfer and former world no.1 lived in Kings Langley and attended the Rudolph Steiner School
- Frank Toovey Lake (1849–1868), a member of the mill-owning Toovey family and a Victorian sailor who died in Japan while a member of Richard Henry Brunton's lighthouse survey party
- Steven Finn (b. 1989), former England cricket international
- Anthony Joshua (b. 1989), former World Heavyweight Champion attended Kings Langley School
- Stuart Slater (b. 1969), former West Ham United footballer
- John Milbank (b. 1952), Anglican theologian
- Ondine Achampong (b.2004) British artistic gymnast world, European commonwealth medalist
