= Christopher Augustus Cox =

British Army soldier

- Born: 25 December 1889; Kings Langley, Hertfordshire, England
- Died: 28 March 1959 (aged 69); Kings Langley, Hertfordshire, England
- Burial place: Kings Langley Cemetery, Hertfordshire, England
- Military career
- Allegiance: United Kingdom
- Branch: British Army
- Service years: 1914−1917
- Rank: Private
- Service number: 13909
- Units: Bedfordshire Regiment; Home Guard
- Conflicts: World War I World War II
- Awards: Victoria Cross

Private Christopher Augustus Cox VC (25 December 1889 – 28 April 1959), was a British Army soldier and an English recipient of the Victoria Cross (VC) the highest and most prestigious award for gallantry in the face of the enemy that can be awarded to British and Commonwealth forces.

== Early army career ==
Cox was born and later worked as a farm labourer in the Hertfordshire village of Kings Langley. He married Maud Swan in 1912 and had one son when war was declared, but still volunteered in September 1914. He was a private in the 7th Battalion, The Bedfordshire Regiment. He went to France in July 1915 and spent nearly two years in the trenches, first on the Somme near Albert. He was wounded on the first day of the Somme offensive. He was at Thiepval in September 1916 and participated in the Bihucourt assault in March 1917, an engagement in which his actions would earn him the Victoria Cross.

== Victoria Cross ==
On 13 March 1917 at Achiet-le-Grand, France, during an attack by the battalion, the front wave was checked by very heavy artillery and machine gun fire and the whole line had to take cover in shell holes. Cox, a stretcher-bearer, went out over fire-swept ground and single-handedly rescued four men. Having collected the wounded of his own battalion he then helped to bring in the wounded of the adjoining battalion. On two subsequent days he carried out similar work with complete disregard for his own safety.

== Injury and later life ==
He sustained serious wounds to his foot in an attack on the village of Cherisy on 3 May 1917 which resulted in him being sent back to England, after which he helped to train recruits. Cox was presented with the Victoria Cross by King George V on 21 July 1917 at Buckingham Palace. After the war, he refused the offer of a commission and a house and began work as a builder in Kings Langley, later being employed at the nearby Ovaltine factory. During the Second World War, he joined the local Home Guard.

His family expanded to eight children and 14 grandchildren. He died on 28 April 1959 at the age of 69. His Victoria Cross is currently on display at the Imperial War Museum, London, England.

== Memorial celebration in 2007 ==
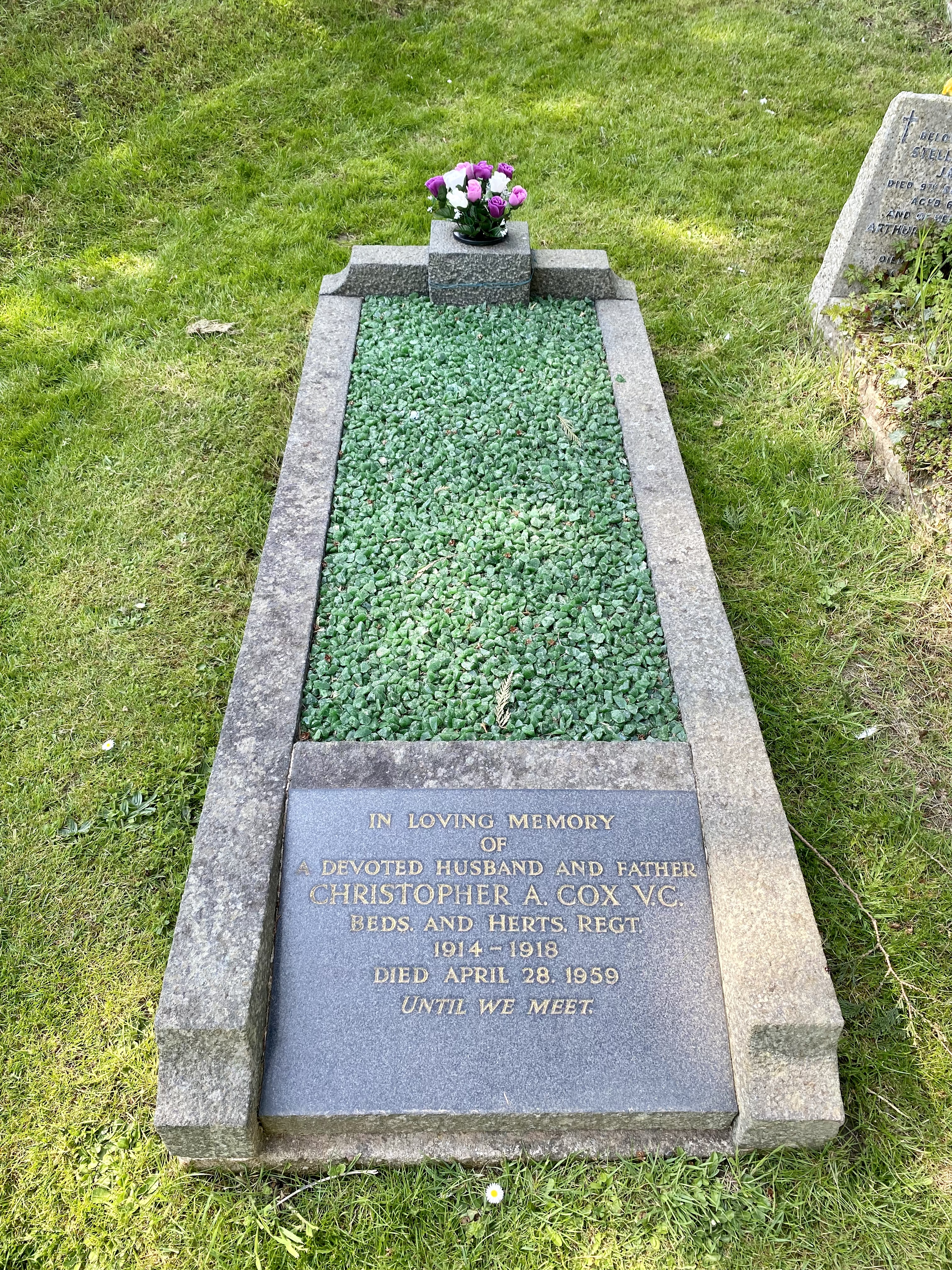
Cox's grave at All Saints' Church, Kings Langley

On 9 September 2007 Kings Langley village celebrated Christopher Augustus Cox's life and daring deeds in a village ceremony. The High Street was closed to traffic to allow a pipe band, standard bearers, ex-service men and women, local dignitaries and members of the Cox family to parade from the Kings Langley Methodist Church along the High Street to the Parish Church for a memorial service. The Last Post played by bugle was sounded within the Church and by the grave. The congregation then moved to the community centre, where artifacts relating to Christopher Cox's life were on display.

Kings Langley village was twinned with Achiet-le-Grand in France in November 2009, in honour of Christopher Cox.

== Bibliography ==
- Gliddon, Gerald (2012) [1998]. Arras and Messines 1917. VCs of the First World War. The History Press. ISBN 978-0-7524-6604-0.
