= All Saints' Church, Kings Langley =

Church in Hertfordshire, England

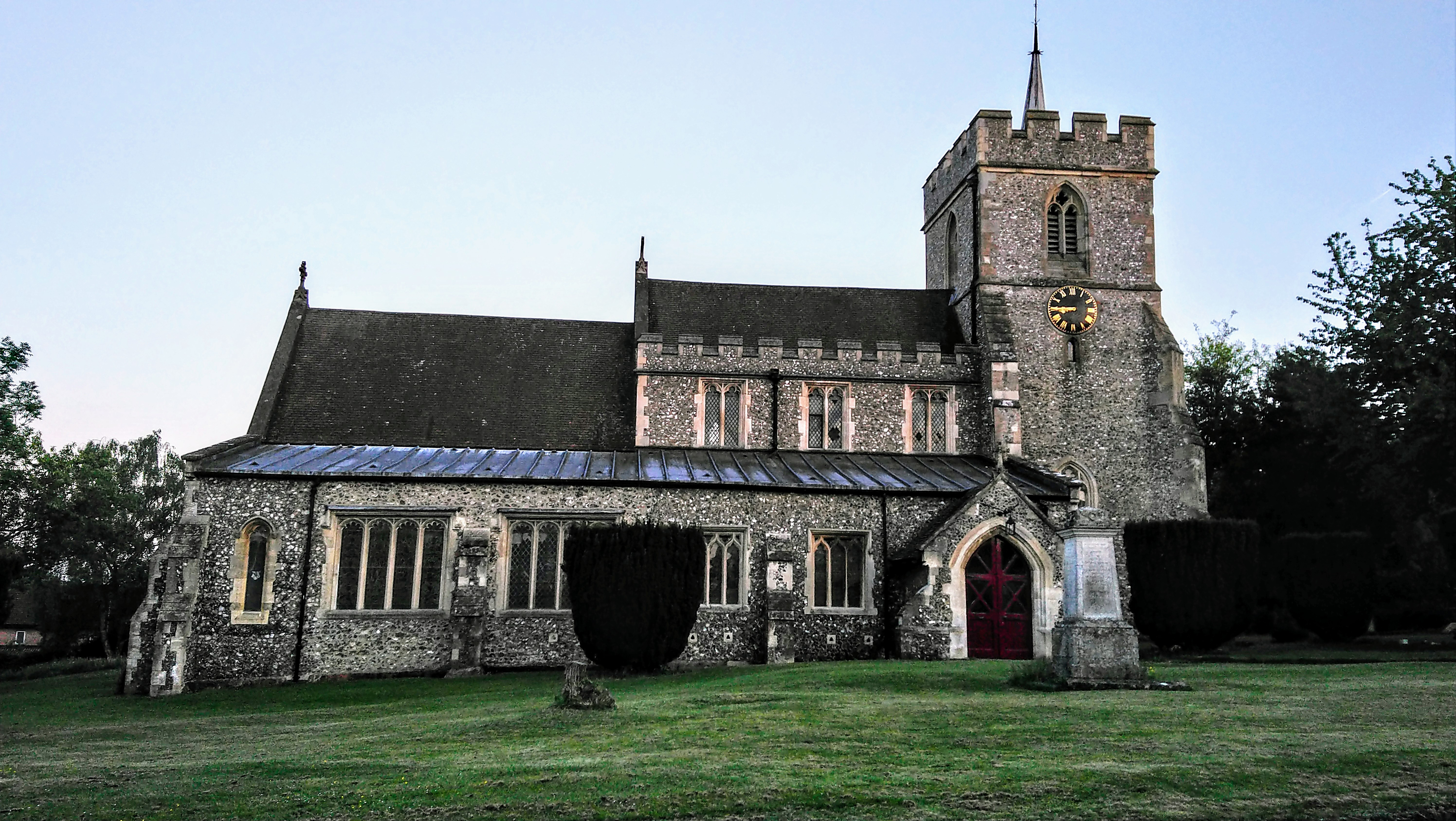
- All Saints' Church, Kings Langley
- All Saints' Church, Kings Langley
- 51°42′39.25″N 0°26′52.6″W
- Denomination: Church of England
- Website: http://beneficeoflangelei.org.uk/allsaints/

History
- Dedication: All Saints

Administration
- Province: Canterbury
- Diocese: St Albans
- Archdeaconry: St Albans
- Deanery: Hemel Hempstead
- Parish: Kings Langley

Clergy
- Vicar: Langelei Team Ministry

All Saints' Church, Kings Langley is a Church of England parish church located in the village of Kings Langley in Hertfordshire, England. Originating in the 13th century, the church contains the tomb of Edmund of Langley (1341–1402), the first Duke of York. It is a Grade II* listed building.

== Description ==
The exterior of All Saints' Church is flint with dressings of Totternhoe Stone. It has red tile roofs and a squat, buttressed bell tower with battlements and a "Hertfordshire spike" or small central spire. The church is mostly in the Perpendicular style, but was heavily restored in the Victorian era. Internally, the nave has three bays with a clerestory and north and south aisles which both terminate in chapels, in line with the east end of the chancel.

== History ==
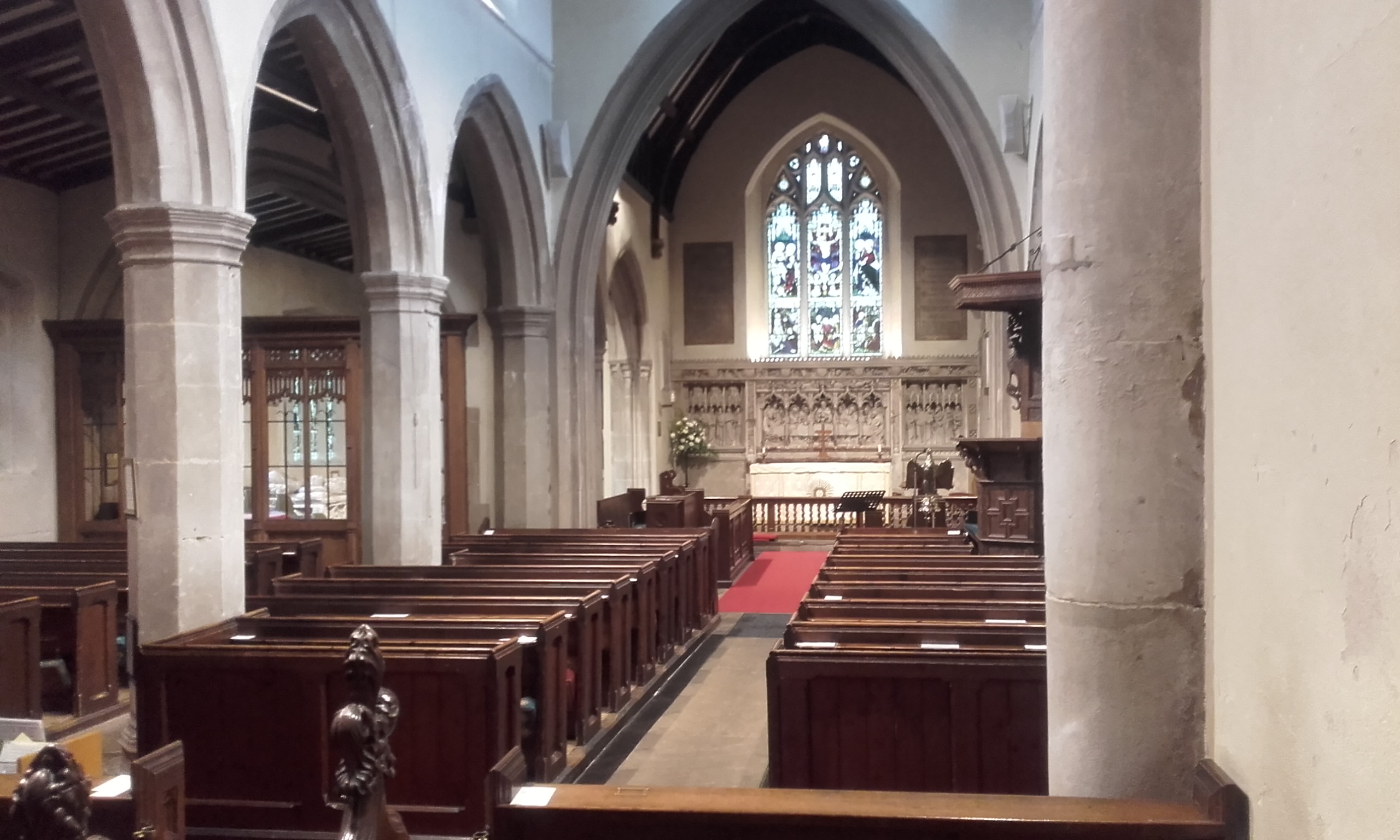
The interior of All Saints' Church, looking east from under the tower.

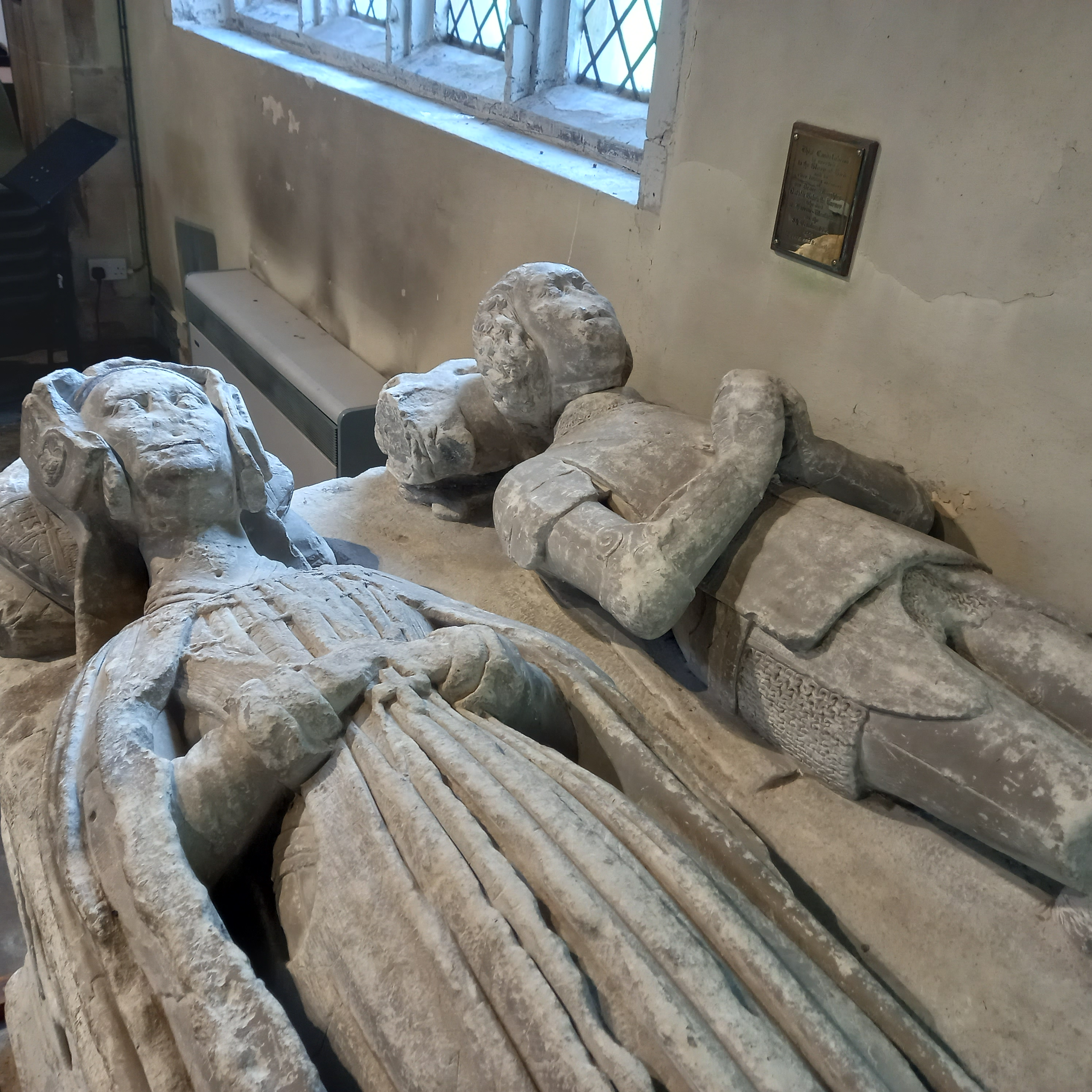
The effigy tomb of Sir Ralph and Lady Eleanor Verny in the north chapel.

The first record of a parish church at Kings Langley was in 1215, when a grant of advowson (the right of a patron to appoint a parish priest) was confirmed by King John. There is a record of a visit to the church by King Edward I in 1299 and a list of vicars extends back to that century.

The earliest part of the church is the chancel which is dated to the 13th century, due to the remnants of lancet windows in the Early English style and the double piscina in the south wall. The nave is 14th century, probably overlying an earlier structure, but the arcades date from the 15th century when the north and south aisles were rebuilt. The north chapel and the three-storey tower were added later in the same century; the earliest of the six bells present today is dated 1657. In 1575, the chest tomb of Edmund of Langley, 1st Duke of York, (1341–1402) was brought to the church when Kings Langley Priory was dissolved; it was initially sited in the chancel, flanking the high altar. In the north chapel is the tomb and effigies of Sir Ralph Verney (d. 1528) and his wife Eleanor. The hexagonal 17th-century wooden pulpit survives, with its original tester or sounding board.

In 1877, the north aisle was extended to form a new royal chapel to which Edmund's tomb was relocated from the chancel in the following year; Queen Victoria donated the window beneath which it now stands. At the same time, an alabaster reredos designed by Joseph Clarke was erected behind the altar, and a new east window in the Perpendicular style was installed, revealing in the process the remains of the earliest lancets. Further work in 1894 saw the addition of a choir vestry to the south and the rebuilding of the north porch. In 1899 the clerestory windows and the top of the tower were rebuilt. In 1976, a polygonal church room in a contemporary style was also added to the south. The church became a Grade II* listed building in January 1967.

The churchyard includes a monument to Elizabeth Hyde in the form of a Portland stone obelisk dating from 1801 or earlier, and the grave of Christopher Augustus Cox (1889-1959), who was awarded the Victoria Cross in 1917 for his courage as a stretcher bearer under enemy fire during the First World War.

=== Tomb of Edmund of Langley ===
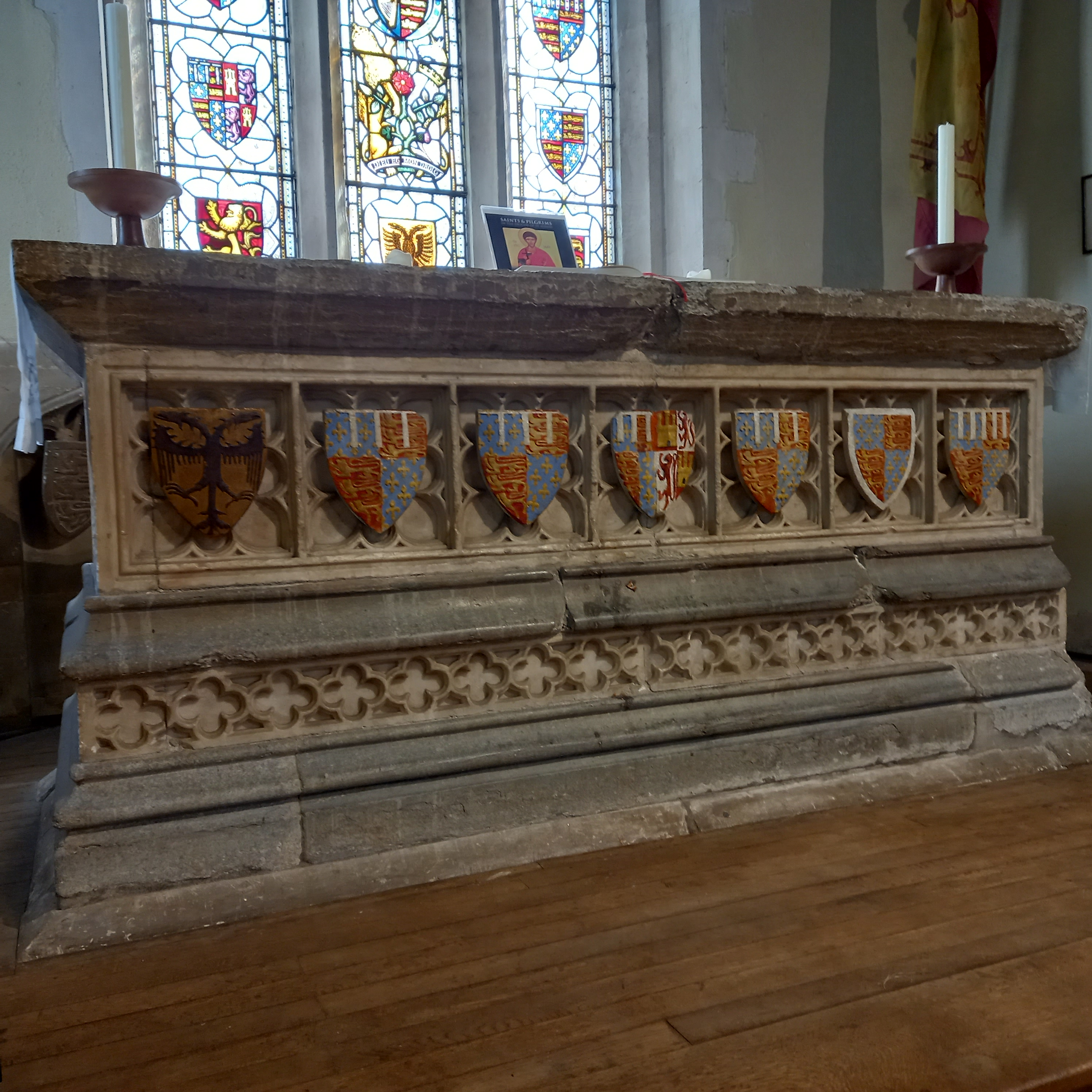
The tomb of Edmund of Langley, 1st Duke of York, which was brought to the church in 1575 after the nearby Kings Langley Priory had been dissolved.

The tomb consists of a plinth of Purbeck marble supporting sides of alabaster which are decorated with heraldic shields, thirteen of which survive of the original twenty. The seven shields on the side which now faces west are:

- 1: An eagle displayed with two heads sable, representing the Holy Roman Emperor
- 2: Royal arms differenced by a label of three points argent, representing the Prince of Wales, Edward the Black Prince
- 3: Royal arms differenced by a label of three points argent, representing Lionel of Antwerp, Duke of Clarence
- 4: Royal arms differenced by a label of three points ermine impaling Castile and León, representing the marriage of Edmund of Langley to Isabel, daughter of Peter of Castile
- 5: Royal arms differenced by a label of three points argent, representing Edmund of Langley
- 6: Arms of France and England with a border argent, representing Thomas of Woodstock, Duke of Gloucester
- 7: Royal arms differenced by a label of five points argent, representing Henry of Bolingbroke, Duke of Lancaster

On the north end of the tomb, the three shields are:

- 1: A cross pattée between five martlets or, representing Saint Edward the Confessor
- 2: Arms of France quartered with England, the royal arms of King Richard II of England
- 3: Three crowns or representing Saint Edmund the Martyr

On the south end of the tomb, the three shields are:

- 1: Arms of England with a border argent, representing Thomas Holland, 1st Earl of Kent
- 2: Arms of England with a border azure and thereon fleurs de lis or, representing John Holland, 1st Earl of Huntingdon
- 3: A lion or, representing Richard Fitzalan, 4th Earl of Arundel

The inclusion of the Bolingbroke and Holland arms suggests that the tomb was made after Edmund's marriage to Joan Holland in November 1393, but before the banishment of Henry of Bolingbroke in September 1398. The shields on the east side have all been lost. The present top of the tomb is part of an altar stone. What may have been the original top slab is now set in the floor of the north chapel and has an indentation for a monumental brass depicting a woman's figure.

When the tomb was moved in 1877, it was found to contain the bones of a man and woman identified as the Edmund and his first wife Isabel. A third body of a younger woman was also in the tomb, encased in lead, who was tentatively identified at the time as Anne de Mortimer, the wife of Edmund's second son, Richard of Conisburgh, 3rd Earl of Cambridge.

In 1965, the scholar and politician, Enoch Powell, published an article in History Today, speculating that Edmund's tomb had originally been made for King Richard II, which he had discarded after the death of his first wife, Queen Anne of Bohemia, in favour of the double tomb for both of them which is still at Westminster Abbey. The redundant tomb may have been repurposed for the interment of Isabel, with the arms at the head of the tomb being replaced. Powell argued that the presence of Richard's personal arms, those of the royal saints and the eagle of Charles IV, Holy Roman Emperor, the father of Anne, all point to the tomb being originally intended for Richard.

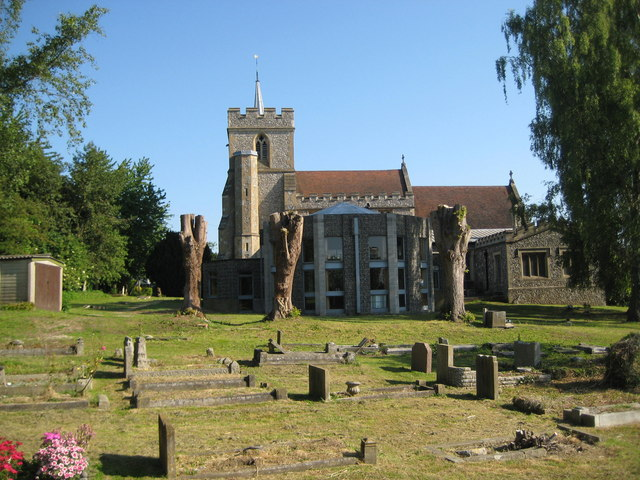
All Saints' Church viewed from the south in 2009, showing the modern parish room.

== Present ==
All Saints' Church forms part of a team ministry of four local parishes, the Benefice of Langelei. The main service of the week is Parish Eucharist on Sunday mornings which is streamed online, following traditional Anglican style of worship with robed choir. The church has a team of bellringers. Provision for children includes activities during the Sunday service and a midweek group for pre-school children. Fundraising is undertaken by a group called Friends of All Saints; annual events include a beer festival and a Christmas Tree Festival.

In 2021, a plan was made public to reorder the church, with the intention of improving accessibility and increasing the flexibility of the building for worship and community use. Plans include replacing steps with ramps and level flooring, updating the heating system and removing the pews to allow different seating options.
