= Achiet-le-Grand =

- Commune
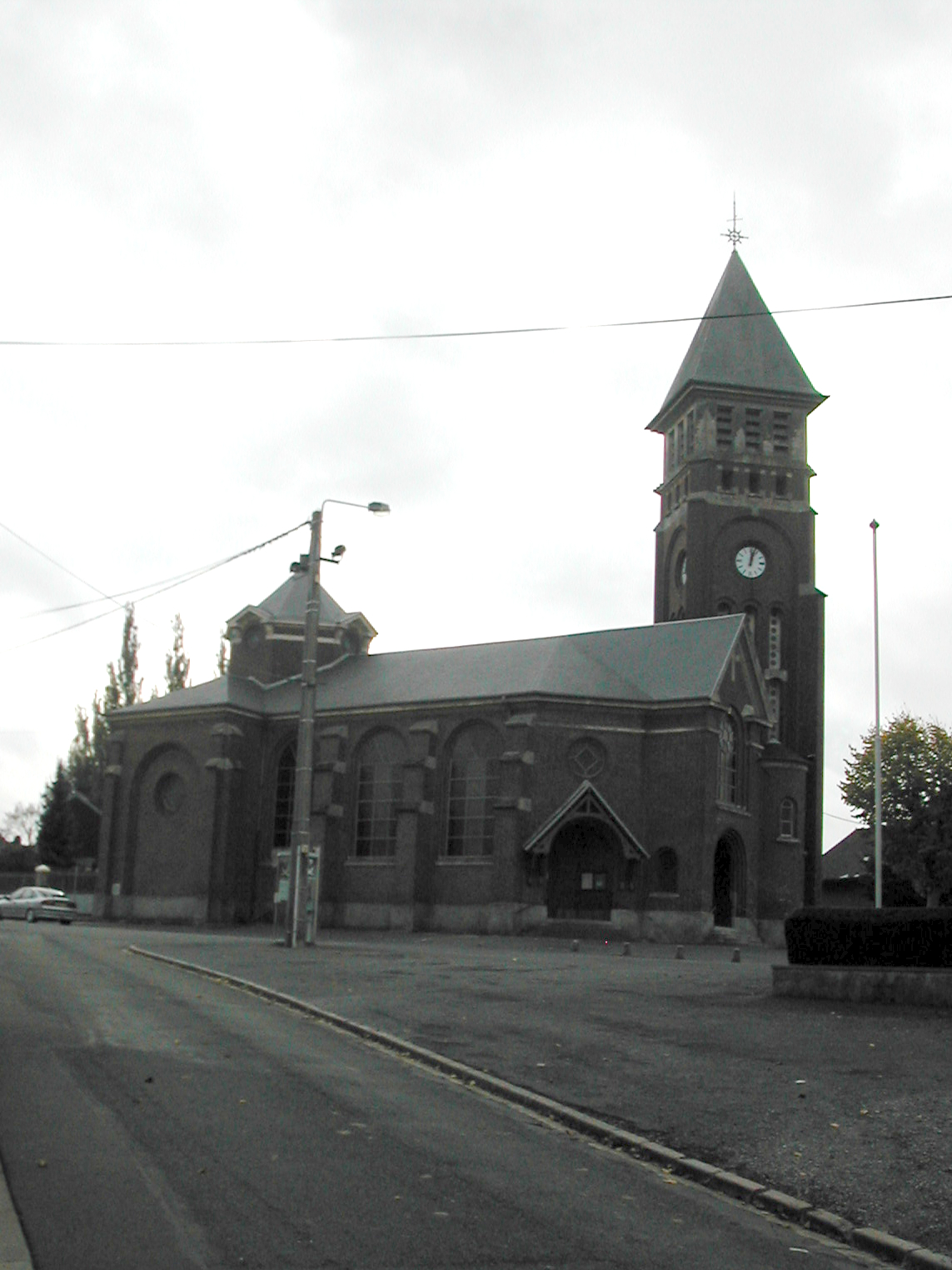
- The church of Achiet-le-Grand

- Coat of arms
- Location of Achiet-le-Grand
- Location within France Location within Hauts-de-France
- Coordinates: 50°07′53″N 2°47′00″E
- Country: France
- Region: Hauts-de-France
- Department: Pas-de-Calais
- Arrondissement: Arras
- Canton: Bapaume
- Intercommunality: Sud-Artois

Government
  - Mayor (2020–2026): Patricia Copin
- Area^{1}: 5.08 km^{2} (1.96 sq mi)
- Elevation: 117 m (384 ft)
- Highest elevation: 136 m (446 ft)
- Lowest elevation: 104 m (341 ft)
- Population (2023): 974
  - Density: 192/km^{2} (497/sq mi)
- Time zone: UTC+01:00 (CET)
  - Summer (DST): UTC+02:00 (CEST)
- INSEE/Postal code: 62005 /62121
- ^{1} French Land Register data, which excludes lakes, ponds, glaciers > 1 km^{2} (0.386 sq mi or 247 acres) and river estuaries.

Achiet-le-Grand (French pronunciation: [aʃjɛ lə ɡʁɑ̃]) is a commune in the Pas-de-Calais department in northern France.

== Geography ==
A farming village located 12 miles (19 km) south of Arras, at the D7 and D9 road junction. The SNCF railway has a station here.

== History ==
Achiet-le-Grand is on the Paris–Lille railway. In 1871 it got a secondary rail connection to Bapaume, later extended to form the Achiet–Marcoing railway.

The commune was involved in the theatre of operations of the Battle of Bapaume (1871), during the Franco-Prussian War.

The village was twinned with Kings Langley in Hertfordshire, England in November 2009, in honour of Christopher Cox VC from that village who won a Victoria Cross in fighting near Achiet-le-Grand in World War I.

== Population ==
Historical population
Year	Pop.	±% p.a.
1968	774	—
1975	787	+0.24%
1982	890	+1.77%
1990	948	+0.79%
1999	1,016	+0.77%
2007	1,053	+0.45%
2012	1,036	−0.32%
2017	988	−0.94%
2023	974	−0.24%
Source: INSEE

== Sights ==
- The church of St.John, dating from the twentieth century.
- A World War I cemetery.

== See also ==
Communes of the Pas-de-Calais department
