= Margaret Cross =

Margaret Cross (22 December 1866 – 14 March 1962) was a British educator and school principal, a pioneer of Co-education and of Steiner Waldorf education in Britain as well as of Biodynamic agriculture. Together with Hannah Clark she founded the Kings Langley Priory School, later the Rudolf Steiner School Kings Langley, which was closed in March 2019.

== Biography ==
Margaret Frances Cross was born on 22 December 1866 in Preston, Lancashire. Her mother died when she was two years old and she was raised by her maternal grandmother until she, in her turn, died. She then moved to her father’s family who were farming in Cambridgeshire, completed her schooling and studied at the University of Cambridge. While at the university, she met Miss Hannah Clark, one of the pioneers of co-educational boarding schools in Britain and began to work at her school as assistant teacher. The two became partners until Hannah Clark’s death in 1934, though at some point she left England to further her studies in Vienna.

With Hannah Clark, Margaret Cross moved first of all to Overstrand in Norfolk as teacher of music and mathematics, then in 1899 to Coombe Hill House, East Grinstead in Sussex, where apparently, her father, now retired from farming, lived as a border. Here the two women developed their educational methods and values of mixed-sex education close to nature, with the practical tasks farming and animal husbandry, cooking, cleaning and washing forming an integral part of the lessons.

In 1909 the Priory in Kings Langley, London was acquired, with Margaret Cross listed as co-principal and responsible for much of the development work. The intention was to integrate into the education the principles of Maria Montessori, as particularly Margaret Cross was interested in modern methods of education and made it her business to attend conferences and keep abreast of developments. Then Margaret Cross was invited by Prof Millicent Mackenzie to join her with a group of other teachers from Britain, in attending a course of lectures on education by Rudolf Steiner in Dornach, Switzerland in December 1921. This was followed in April 1922 by two lectures by Steiner at Stratford-upon-Avon, England, during which period he visited the school in Kings Langley. It was this visit that prompted the two women to offer their school as the first to implement the ideas of Steiner’s education in Britain, a conversion that was to take place over many years. Shortly after the Stratford lectures, Margaret Cross attended Rudolf Steiner's conference on Waldorf educational practices at Oxford in August 1922.

Margaret Cross began to concern herself with Anthroposophy and was present at the Christmas Foundation Meeting of the re-constituted Anthroposophical Society in 1923. It is not clear when she began to study and practice Biodynamic agriculture but in 1927 she joined the Agricultural Research circle of the Anthroposophical Society. Her initiative and research together with Ehrenfried Pfeiffer led to the founding of the Biodynamic Agricultural Foundation of Great Britain, today called the Biodynamic Agriculture Association. She was the editor of Stars and Furrows, the newsletter of the Biodynamic Foundation from 1935 until 1951.

Her friend and lifelong co-worker, Hannah Clark, died in 1934, and tombstone is in the churchyard of the parish church of All Saints'. Miss Cross continued to run the school management together with a Miss Burton, who had joined them in 1915. Vera Compton-Burnett and her sister Juliet, sisters of the writer Ivy Compton-Burnett and daughters of the well-known homeopathic physician Dr James Compton-Burnett, were amongst the teachers at the school. The full conversion to Steiner education achieved its final step when the Rudolf Steiner New School moved into the Priory House site next door, gradually incorporating the old Priory and becoming the Rudolf Steiner School Kings Langley. Margaret Cross died in 1962 under the care of her friend and colleague Miss Burton.
