= Roundwood Halt railway station =

Disused railway station in Hertfordshire, England

Roundwood Halt
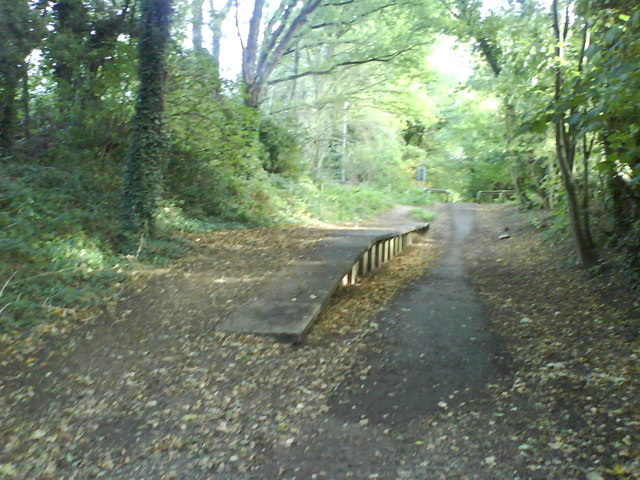
- The remains of the platform in 2008

General information
- Location: Harpenden, Hertfordshire; England
- Coordinates: 51.8197°N 0.3706°W
- Grid reference: TL124147
- Platforms: 1

Other information
- Status: Disused

History
- Original company: London, Midland and Scottish Railway
- Post-grouping: London, Midland and Scottish Railway

Key dates
- 8 August 1927: Opened
- 16 June 1947: Closed
Location

Roundwood Halt railway station co-served the town of Harpenden, in Hertfordshire, England; between 1927 and 1949, it was a stop on the Nickey Line that linked Hemel Hempstead and Harpenden.

== History ==
The station was opened on 8 August 1927 by the Midland Railway. It was situated south of the junction on Roundwood Road and was planned to serve a housing development in Harpenden, given its expansion as a London dormitory town.

The halt had one concrete platform in the cutting on the west side of the line, with a timber waiting shelter. A timber footbridge was built over the line in 1926, which was replaced by a tubular metal bridge in 1957.

The station was closed on 16 June 1947.

Preceding station	Disused railways	Following station
Harpenden; Line closed, station open	London, Midland and Scottish Railway; Nickey Line	Redbourn; Line and station closed

== The site today ==
The track was taken up in 1982 and the trackbed became part of a shared-use path in the mid-1980s. The platform and the yellow single arm lower quadrant type signal are extant.
