= Heath Park Halt railway station =

Former railway station in Hertfordshire, England

Heath Park Halt
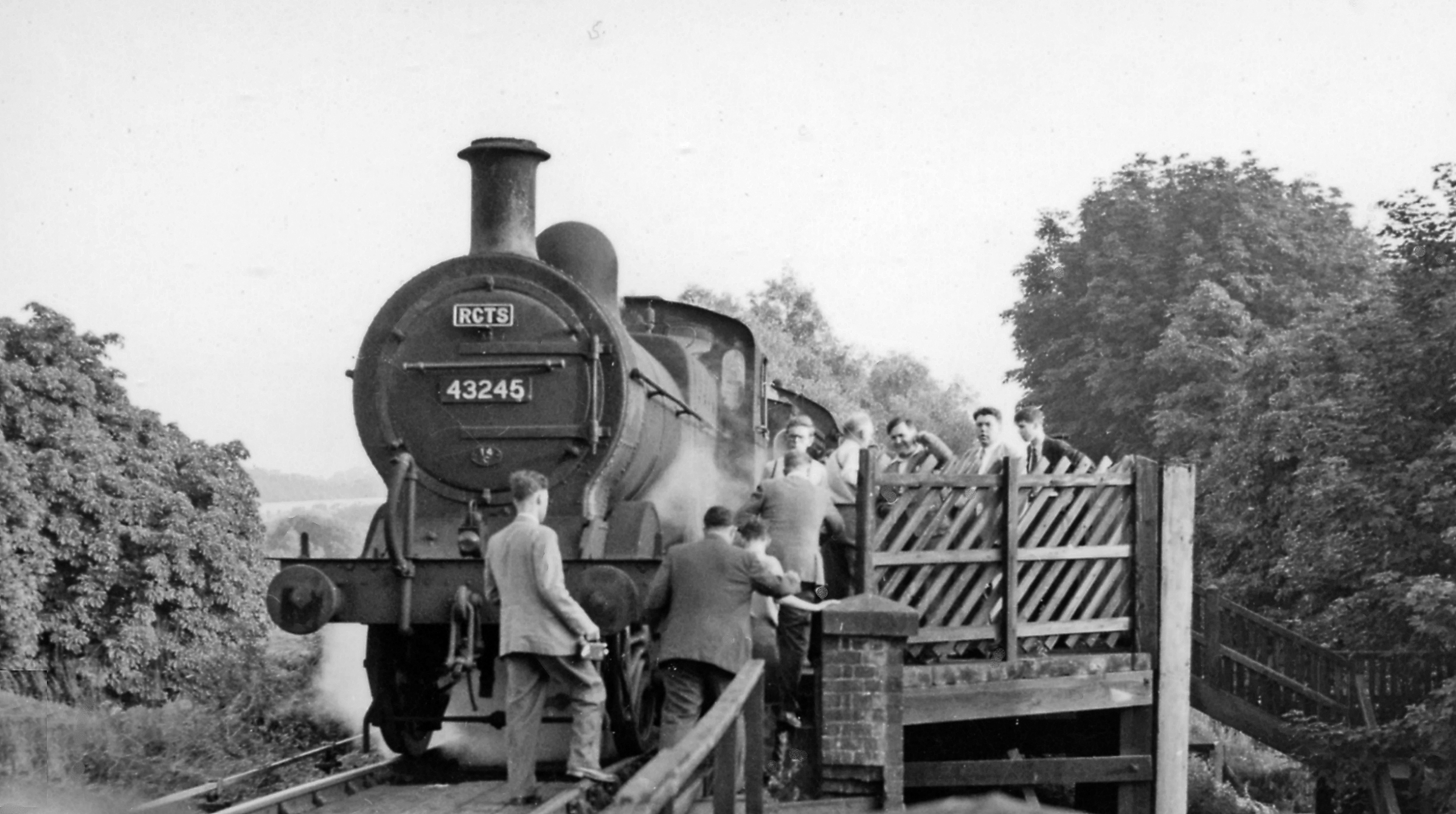
- A Midland Railway Class 3F at Heath Park Halt on an RCTS Rail Tour in 1958

General information
- Location: Hemel Hempstead, Dacorum; England
- Coordinates: 51.7445°N 0.4752°W
- Grid reference: TL053062
- Platforms: 1

Other information
- Status: Disused

History
- Original company: Midland Railway
- Pre-grouping: Midland Railway
- Post-grouping: London Midland and Scottish Railway

Key dates
- 9 August 1905: Opened
- 16 June 1947: Closed
- 1960: station demolished
Location

Heath Park Halt was a railway station in Hemel Hempstead, Hertfordshire in England, UK. It was the terminus for passenger services on the Nickey line, a 9-mile (14 km) branch line which ran from Harpenden into Hemel Hempstead town centre. Passenger services were withdrawn in 1947, and the line through the station was closed completely in 1959.

The station was located on an embankment above the junction of Station Road and Corner Hall Road. Today, nothing of the station or the embankment remains; the site it occupied lies directly opposite the former Kodak headquarters building.

== History ==
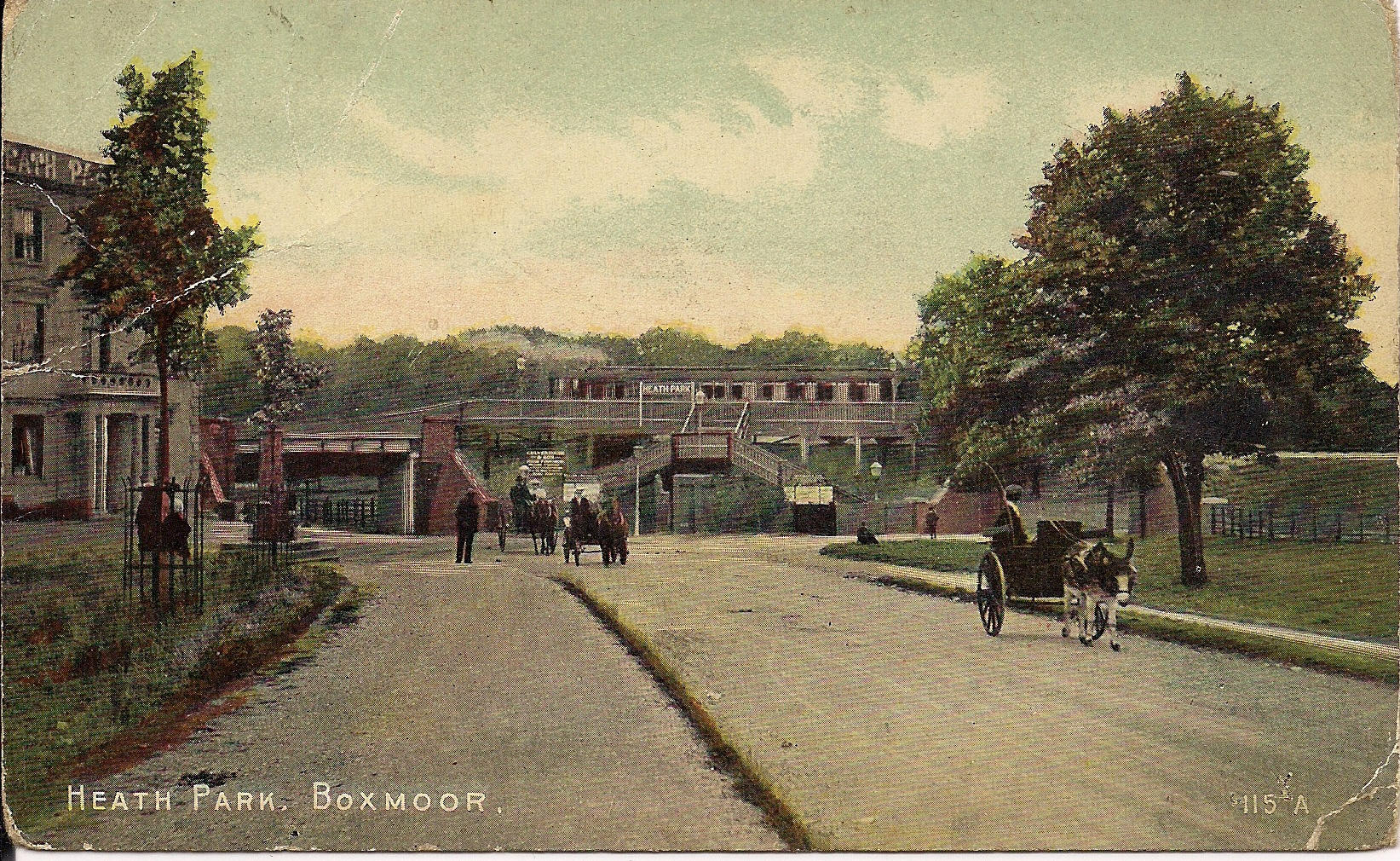
A 1908 postcard of Heath Park Halt railway station, seen from the corner of St John's Road & Station Road

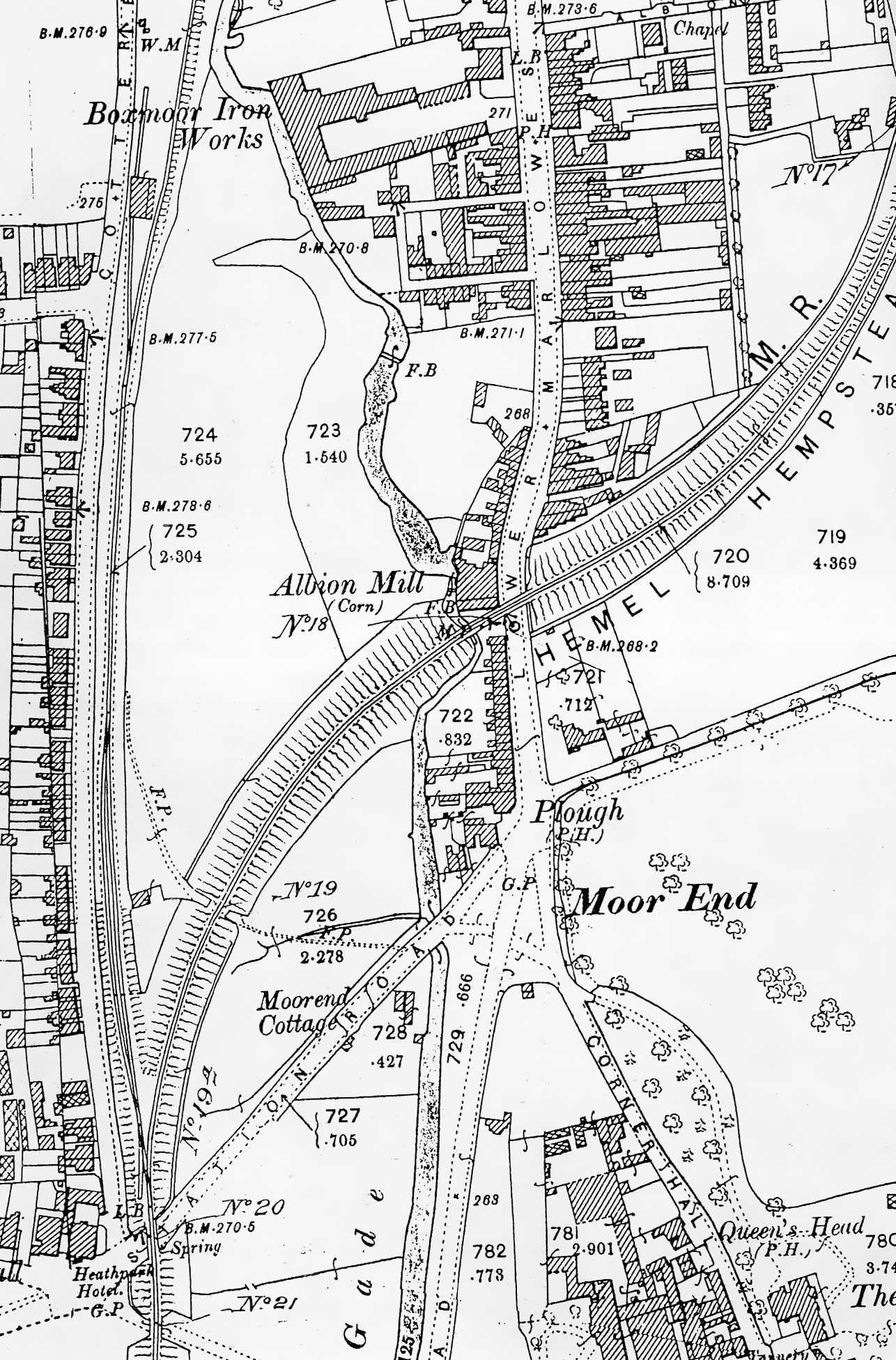
An 1898 map of Boxmoor; Heath Park Halt was built 7 years after this map was drawn, at the bottom left

The Nicky Line was opened in 1877 to provide a town-centre railway link from Hemel Hempstead to the Midland Main Line. Hemel Hempstead's closest station, Boxmoor station, was located a mile outside the town centre. The London and Birmingham Railway (L&BR) line which opened in 1838 had been forced to follow a route which bypassed the town by a mile after resistance to the railway by influential local landowners, and the town council sought to provide a more convenient station for the municipality. After several years of failed proposals, the Hemel Hempstead and London and Birmingham Railway company failed financially and in the end the project to build a line into the town centre was rescued by the Midland Railway company who agreed to fund the project.

Originally the line terminated at Hemel Hempsted (Midland) but demand for coal supplies to Duckhall Gasworks meant that a goods service was able to run almost as far as the main line at Boxmoor. Passenger services were extended, but not as far as Boxmoor, and Heath Park Halt opened in 1905, becoming the new passenger terminus.

The station consisted of a single 100-metre (330 ft) timber platform on an embankment, on the west side of the line between two rail bridges over Station Road and Corner Hall Road. A goods yard, Cotrerells Siding, veered north from the halt to Boxmoor Iron Works. An iron gas lamp stood opposite the station, outside the Heath Park Hotel, which still stands today.

South of Heath Park Halt, the Nicky Line crossed the moor along an embankment, crossing the Grand Junction Canal and the London Road (today's A41 road) to the gasworks. A connection was not with the West Coast Main Line at Boxmoor due to rivalry between the Midland Railway and the LNWR (who took over the L&BR in 1846), who competed for passengers for many years. The LNWR operated a competing bus from Hemel town centre to Boxmoor to "poach" passengers for its main line service to London Euston. After the two competitors were merged into the London, Midland and Scottish Railway (LMS), Nickey Line passenger services were reduced and more investment was put into the bus service which was extended to Harpenden.

In 1920, the townspeople of Hemel Hempstead were presented with a battlefield tank by the National War Savings Committee in recognition of their contribution to the war effort during World War I. The tank was delivered to Heath Park railway depot and placed on a plinth outside the Heath Park Hotel. It remained on public display until the outbreak of World War II, when it was removed and broken up for scrap metal.

=== Decline and closure ===
Eventually the road bus service prevailed; Nickey Line passenger trains were "temporarily" suspended during the national coal shortage of 1947 and were never resumed, and the last passenger service on the Nickey Line ran on 16 June 1947. The Nickey Line, now a part of British Railways, was a declining goods branch line.

Hemel Hempstead was designated as a New Town and underwent major redevelopment in the 1950s and 1960s. The Marlowes railway viaduct over the town centre was demolished on 2 July 1960 along with Heath Park Halt. Cuttings were filled in, embankments flattened and commercial buildings and housing estates were built on the former railway land.

Only the northernmost stretch of track between Cupid Green (north of Godwin's Halt) and Harpenden remained in goods operation, having been leased by BR to the Hemelite concrete company in 1968. The Midland Main Line junction at Harpenden was finally severed in 1979 and the last part of the Nickey Line was lifted up in 1982.

Preceding station	Disused railways	Following station
Terminus	Midland Railway; Nickey Line	Hemel Hempsted station Line and station closed

== See also ==
- List of closed railway stations in Britain
