= Hemel Hempsted railway station =

Former railway station in England

Hemel Hempsted
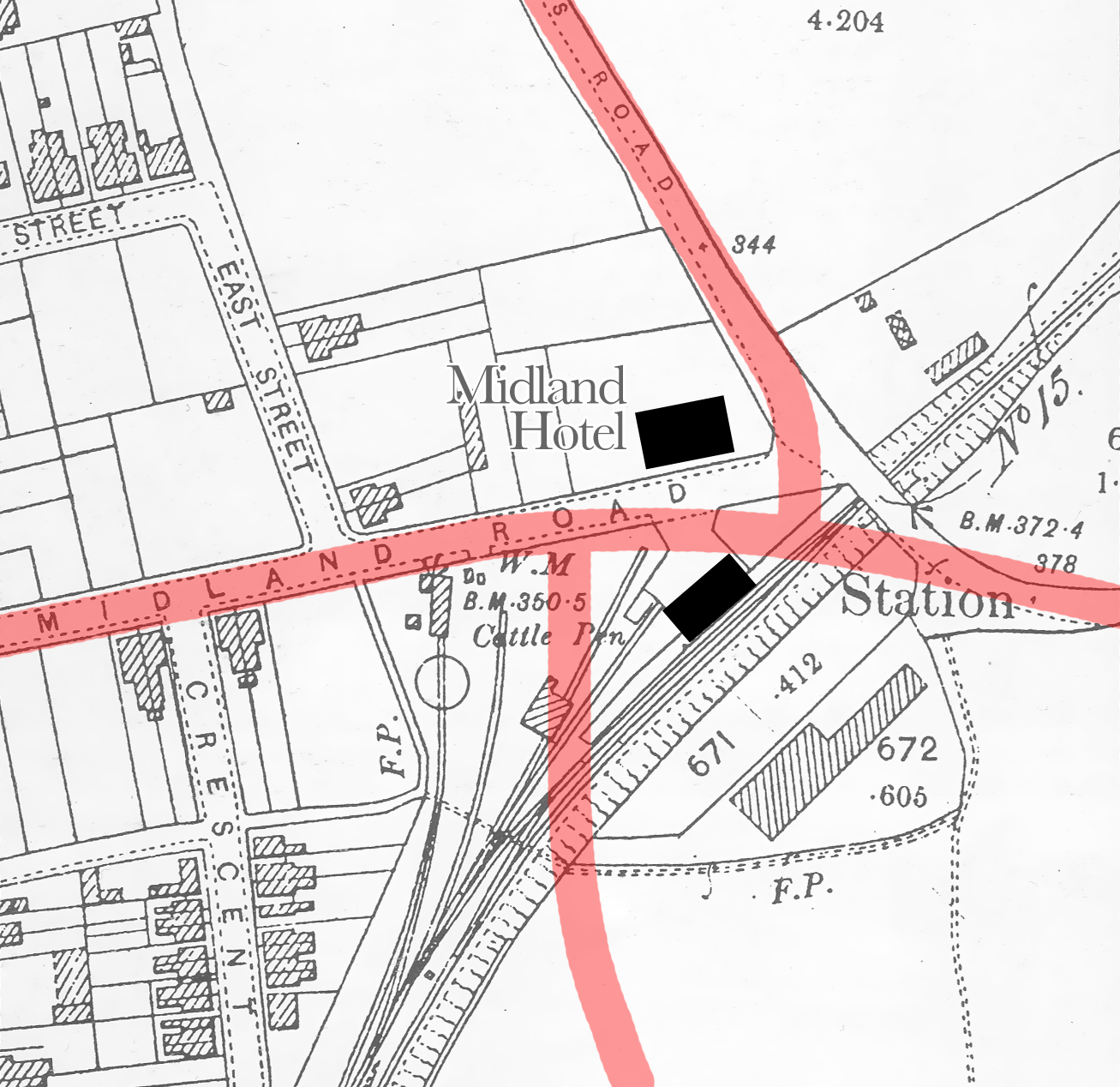
- 1898 OS map showing the location of Hemel Hempsted station (modern road layout is overlaid in red with station and the Midland Hotel marked)

General information
- Location: Hemel Hempstead, Borough of Dacorum; England
- Coordinates: 51.755666°N 0.466481°W
- Grid reference: TL059074
- Line: Nickey Line
- Platforms: 1

Other information
- Status: Disused

History
- Original company: Midland Railway
- Pre-grouping: Midland Railway
- Post-grouping: London Midland and Scottish Railway

Key dates
- 16 June 1877: Opened
- 16 June 1947: Closed to passengers
- 1963: Fully closed
- c.1969: Demolished
Location

Hemel Hempsted station was a railway station in the town of Hemel Hempstead in Hertfordshire, England. UK. It was opened in 1877 by the Midland Railway and was originally the terminus of the Nickey Line, a now-defunct branch line which provided railway services to Chiltern Green and Luton and later to Harpenden.

The station was located next to an embankment by the junction of Midland Road and Adeyfield Road, opposite the Midland Hotel. The hotel still stands today and the segment of Midland Road that ran in front of it is now a parking area. Midland Road crossed the railway via a bridge. It had a single platform and a booking office, waiting room and a passing loop. A goods yard was located to the west of the station.

Passenger traffic on the line ceased in 1947 and the station closed fully in 1963. The siding remained in use for some goods trains until 1969 when the track was lifted and the station was demolished. The Midland Road bridge was filled in and a block of flats was built on the site of the station. The parapet on the north side has survived where the present-day Nickey Line cycle path begins its route to Harpenden.

On platform signs and on tickets, the Midland Railway always spelled the station name as Hemel Hempsted without the 'a'.

== History ==
The Nickey Line was originally proposed in 1862 to provide a town-centre railway link from Hemel Hempstead. The London and Birmingham Railway line which opened in 1838 had been forced to follow a route which bypassed the town by a mile after resistance to the railway by influential local landowners, and the town council sought to provide a more convenient station for the municipality. After several years of failed proposals, the Hemel Hempstead and London and Birmingham Railway company failed financially and in the end the project was rescued by the Midland Railway company who agreed to fund the project.

=== Opening ===
The Nickey Line was opened on 16 July 1877 to great fanfare with celebrations led by the Berkhamsted Rifle Corps Band. A special train was laid on from Hemel Hempsted station to Luton and champagne receptions were held in Luton and Hemel town halls. Church bells were rung and a banner hung across Alexandra Road in Hemel proclaimed "Success to the Hemel Hemptead and Midland Railway Company".

The line's development was chiefly driven by the transportation of goods and coal, and the thriving hat making industry in Luton created demand for a transport link with the straw plait trade that existed in Hemel. As a result, the line was joined to the Midland Main Line north of Harpenden and initially rail services ran to Luton, requiring London-bound passengers to change trains at Chiltern Green. After some years Luton's hat trade had declined and passenger demand caused the junction to be re-aligned south to provide a more convenient interchange at Harpenden station.

=== Bus and rail ===
Rivalry between the Midland Railway and the LNWR (which had absorbed the London and Birmingham Railway in 1846) prevented the line from being extended to join up with the West Coast Main Line. For most of its existence, the Nickey Line's southern terminus was a goods siding at Duckhall gasworks, only 0.5 miles (0.80 km) away from Boxmoor station (today's Hemel Hempstead railway station). Passenger services terminated at Hemel Hempsted until 1905 when a new station was opened at Heath Park Halt, just north of Boxmoor.

The LNWR operated a competing bus from Hemel town centre to Boxmoor to "poach" passengers for its main line service to London Euston. After the two competitors were merged into the London, Midland and Scottish Railway (LMS), Nickey Line passenger services were reduced and more investment was put into the bus service which was extended to Harpenden.

The LMS experimented briefly with new transport technology, the "Ro-Railer", which was a bus/train hybrid that could travel on both roads and railways. By operating a bus service through Hemel Hempstead town which could then run at high speed along railway tracks, the LMS hoped to run a more efficient combined road and rail service. On a demonstration run in 1931, the Ro-Railer was driven along the Nickey Line from Redbourn to Hemel Hempsted, where it entered the siding and was driven up a specially constructed ramp of sleepers laid between the tracks. This provided a level surface for mechanically changing the vehicle from rail to road wheels. It then drove off the railway track and up Crescent Road to tour the locale before returning onto the railway. After the trials, the Ro-Railer vehicle was put into service at Stratford-upon-Avon but the service was not continued on the Nickey Line.

=== Decline & closure ===
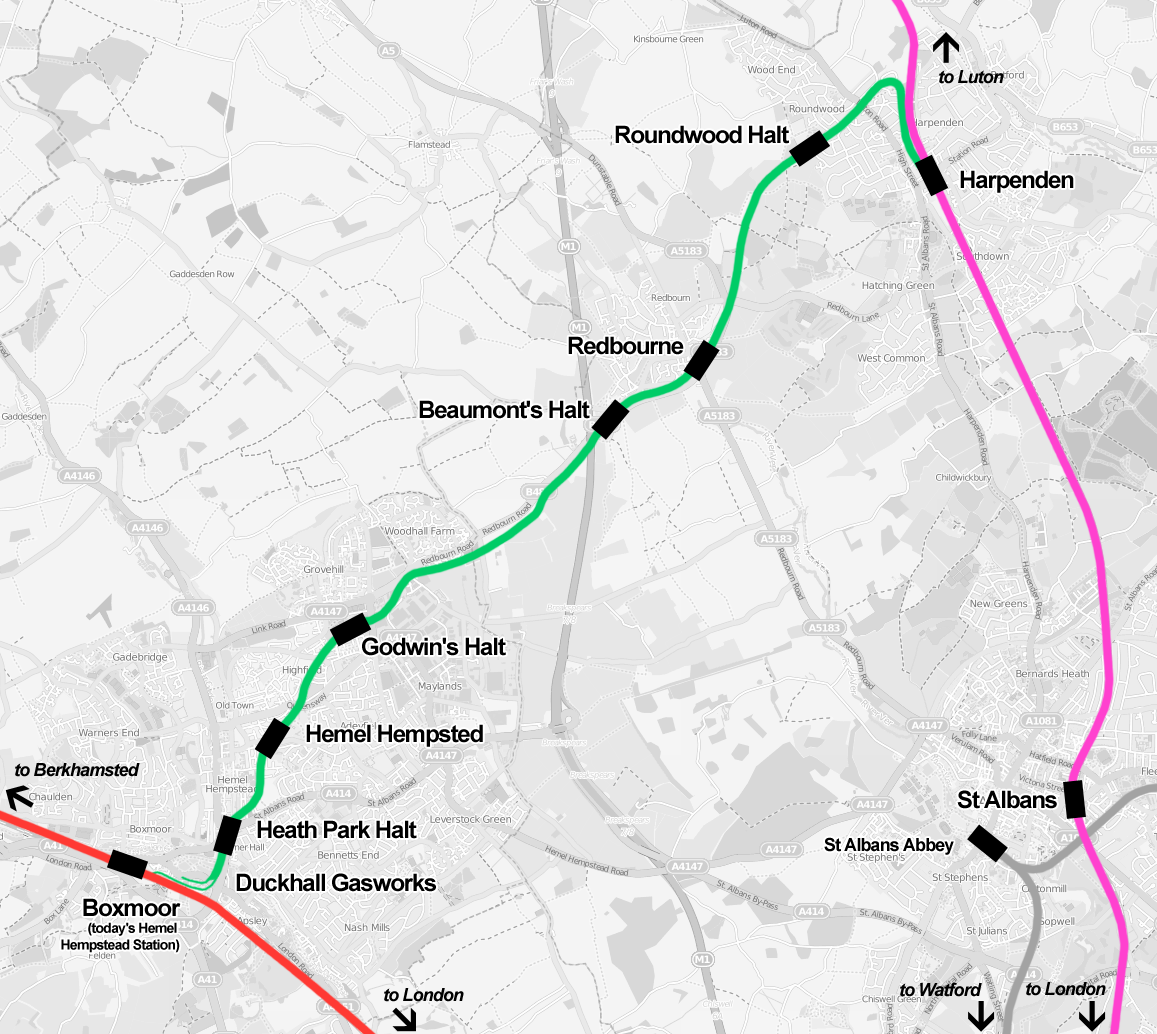
Map of the Nickey Line through Hemel Hempstead, now closed

Eventually the road bus service prevailed; Nickey Line passenger trains were "temporarily" suspended during the national coal shortage of 1947 and were never resumed, and the last passenger service on the Nickey Line ran on 16 June 1947.

Hemel Hempstead, now a designated New Town, underwent major redevelopment in the 1950s and 1960s and the Marlowes railway viaduct over the town centre was demolished on 2 July 1960. The Nickey Line, now a part of British Railways, was a declining goods branch line. The closure of the remaining parts of the line continued in stages and Hemel Hempsted station closed in 1963. Cuttings were filled in, embankments flattened and commercial buildings and housing estates were built on the former railway land.

Only the northernmost stretch of track between Cupid Green (north of Godwin's Halt) and Harpenden remained in goods operation, having been leased by BR to the Hemelite concrete company in 1968. The Midland Main Line junction at Harpenden was finally severed in 1979 and the last part of the Nickey Line was lifted up in 1982.

Preceding station	Disused railways	Following station
Heath Park Halt; Line and station closed	Midland Railway; Nickey Line	Godwin's Halt; Line and station closed

== The site today ==
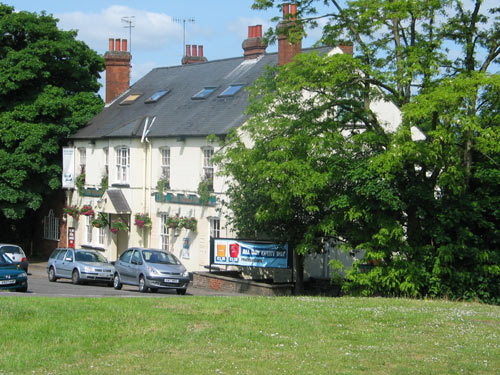
The Midland Hotel, opposite the former site of Hemel Hempsted station; the grass area in front of the hotel covers the original bridge over the former line

Nothing remains today of Hemel Hempsted station; the station site has been filled in and is now occupied by a block of flats, while the road layout has been altered. Part of the former station site lies under a grassed area in front of the Midland Hotel, crossed by the realigned Adeyfield Road, and Mayflower Avenue crosses the former goods yard.

Today the route of the Nickey Line is in use as a public footpath and cycle track, and forms part of Route 57 on the National Cycle Network which begins at the northern side of the former Midland Road bridge.
