= Nickey line =

Former railway line in Hertfordshire, England

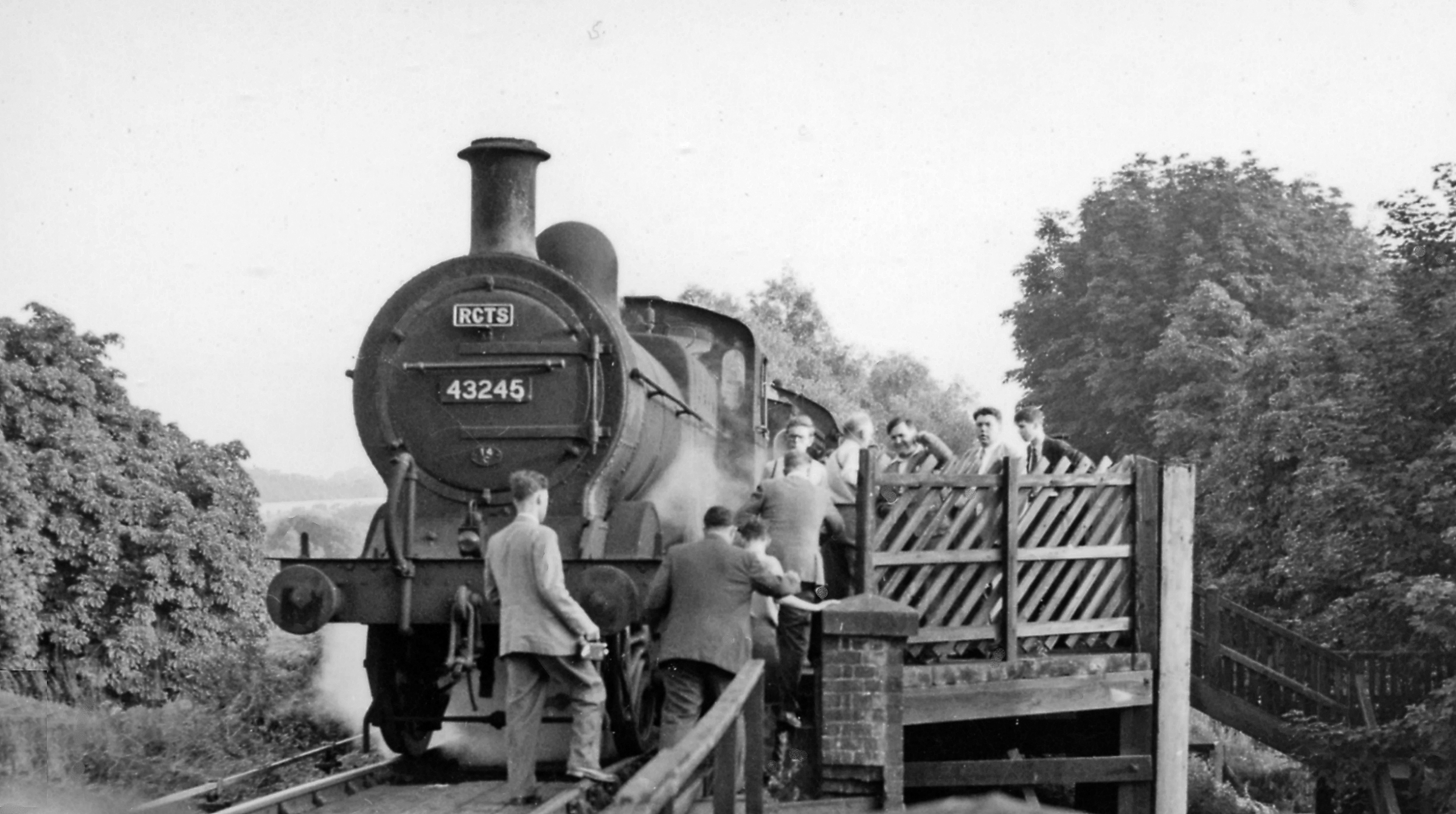
- Heath Park Halt in 1958

Overview
- Status: Dismantled, partly repurposed as a rail trail
- Owner: Midland Railway; British Rail
- Locale: Hertfordshire, England
- Termini: Boxmoor; Harpenden
- Stations: 9

Service
- Type: Local rail
- System: National Rail
- Rolling stock: Midland Railway Johnson 0-6-0, LMS Fowler 2-6-2T, LMS Ivatt Class 4

History
- Opened: 1877
- Closed: 1979

Technical
- Line length: 9 miles (14 km)
- Track gauge: 4 ft 8 1/2 in (1,435 mm) standard gauge
Route map
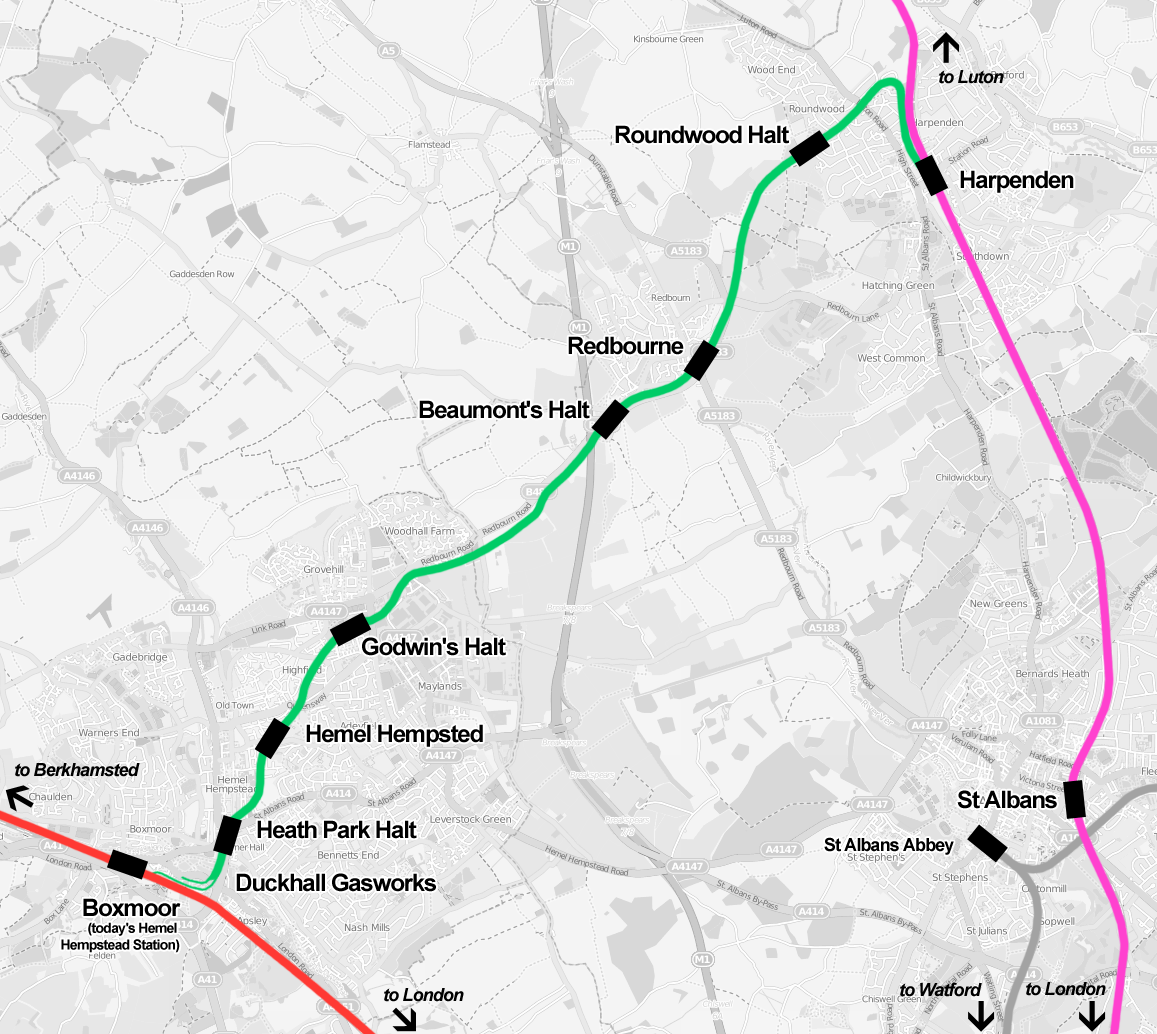

The Nickey line (also known as the Harpenden to Hemel Hempstead branch railway) is a disused railway that once linked the towns of Hemel Hempstead (Note: The exact location of Hemel Hempstead station is: 51.742°N 0.491°W) and Harpenden (Note: The exact location of Harpenden station is: 51.815°N 0.352°W) (initially Luton), via Redbourn, in Hertfordshire, England. The former trackbed has been redeveloped as a rail trail and is part of the Oxford to Welwyn Garden City route of the National Cycle Network. It is approximately 9 miles (14 km) long.

== Toponymy ==
The origin of the nickname "Nickey line" is shrouded in obscurity. Suggestions include being named after the parish of St Nicholas in Harpenden, through which it runs; Hemel's connection with Nicholas Breakspear; the knickerbockers worn by the navvies who constructed the line; or "down the nick", a slang term of engine drivers which meant "to run out of steam" and may have been applicable on the line's difficult inclines.

The spelling of the line's name is recorded as appearing as "Nickey" on signs and tickets for special trains and in the local press; when the line was converted to a shared-use path, the signs which were erected omitted the "e" in the legend "Nicky Line Footpath and Cycleway". The line is commemorated in the modern Marlowes pedestrianisation scheme by a children's playground train and a sign labelled Nicky Line Halt, though no such named station ever existed.

Another possible origin for the name is that the navvies who constructed the line gave it the nickname as the steep climb from the old A6 road (now the A1081) in Harpenden up to the Roundwood Halt is a 1 in 37 gradient, the same as the 3.2 km (2 mi) railway incline called the Lickey Incline south of Birmingham.

The local paper notes that the engines themselves were referred to as "Puffing Annies" by locals, as the climb from the town centre up through Highfield was steep; the engines created much steam and smoke ascending this incline. Older generations in Hemel still refer to the line as the "Puffing Annie", rather than the Nickey line.

== Early proposals ==
In 1837, the London and Birmingham Railway opened the first stretch of the main line from London Euston to Birmingham Curzon Street as far as Hemel Hempstead (today's West Coast Main Line), with the line fully opened as far as Birmingham in 1838. The L&BR's construction had been delayed for several years by vigorous lobbying by a number of powerful and well-connected local landowners, including the eminent surgeon Sir Astley Cooper of Gadebridge House, who were all keen to protect their estates from invasion by the "iron horse". Their campaign was successful and the main line was routed along the River Bulbourne instead of the River Gade, skirting around the edge of Hemel Hempstead. As a result, the railway station serving Hemel Hempstead was built one mile outside the town centre at Boxmoor; Boxmoor and Hemel Hempstead railway station (today's Hemel Hempstead railway station) opened in 1837.

Hemel Hempsted and London and North Western Railway Act 1863
- Act of Parliament
- Parliament of the United Kingdom
- Long title: An Act for making a Railway from the London and North-western Railway at Boxmoor to Hemel Hempsted, in the County of Hertford; and for other Purposes.
- Citation: 26 & 27 Vict. c. clii

Dates
- Royal assent: 13 July 1863

Text of statute as originally enacted

The first proposal for a more convenient rail link for the townspeople of Hemel Hempstead was presented in 1862 by John Grover. His proposal was for a short spur from the main line at Boxmoor, following the route of the River Gade to the lower end of the (old) town at Bury Mill End. At the same meeting, another (more ambitious) proposal was put forward by a Mr Stocken and a Mr Stallon, extending the line to Redbourn to link to the Great Northern Railway at Harpenden. However, Grover's design found a sponsor and, following an act of Parliament, the Hemel Hempsted and London and North Western Railway Act 1863 (26 & 27 Vict. c. clii), the Hemel Hempsted (Note: Hemel Hempsted [sic] was the spelling used widely by the railway companies at the time on ticketing and signage.) and London and North Western Railway Company (HH&L&NWR) was formed to construct and operate the line. However, no construction work was undertaken due to difficulties with local landowners and problems agreeing the connection to the main line at Boxmoor; after a number of years of stagnation the earlier proposals were re-examined.

Hemel Hempsted and London and North-western Railway Extension Act 1866
- Act of Parliament
- Parliament of the United Kingdom
- Long title: An Act to confer further Powers upon the Hemel Hempsted and London and North-western Railway Company; and for other Purposes.
- Citation: 29 & 30 Vict. c. ccxv

Dates
- Royal assent: 16 July 1866

Text of statute as originally enacted

By 1865, the Midland Railway was developing its route out of London St Pancras, opening up new interchange possibilities to the north of Hemel Hempstead. A new railway scheme was put forward by engineers G. W. Hemans and A. Ormsby, which followed the original HH&L&NWR plan as far as Hemel but involved tunnelling under Highfield to connect to the MR at Harpenden, with an option to extend (via another tunnel) to Harpenden East on the GNR's Hertford, Luton & Dunstable branch. The tunnelling proposals proved to be prohibitively expensive, and further opposition from landowners resulted in the scheme being rejected by Parliament in 1865. With the assistance of Grover, the plans were revised and resubmitted for parliamentary approval which was obtained with the Hemel Hempsted and London and North-western Railway Extension Act 1866 (29 & 30 Vict. c. ccxv) being passed. The railway company had meanwhile already commenced construction work in anticipation of approval. The new line was to follow the route authorised in 1863 through Hemel Hempstead and Redbourn, before curving north around Harpenden, crossing the turnpike road (A1081) and passing under the Midland line to connect with the GNR at Harpenden East, with provision for a spur to connect to the MR line north of Harpenden Central.

== Construction and opening ==
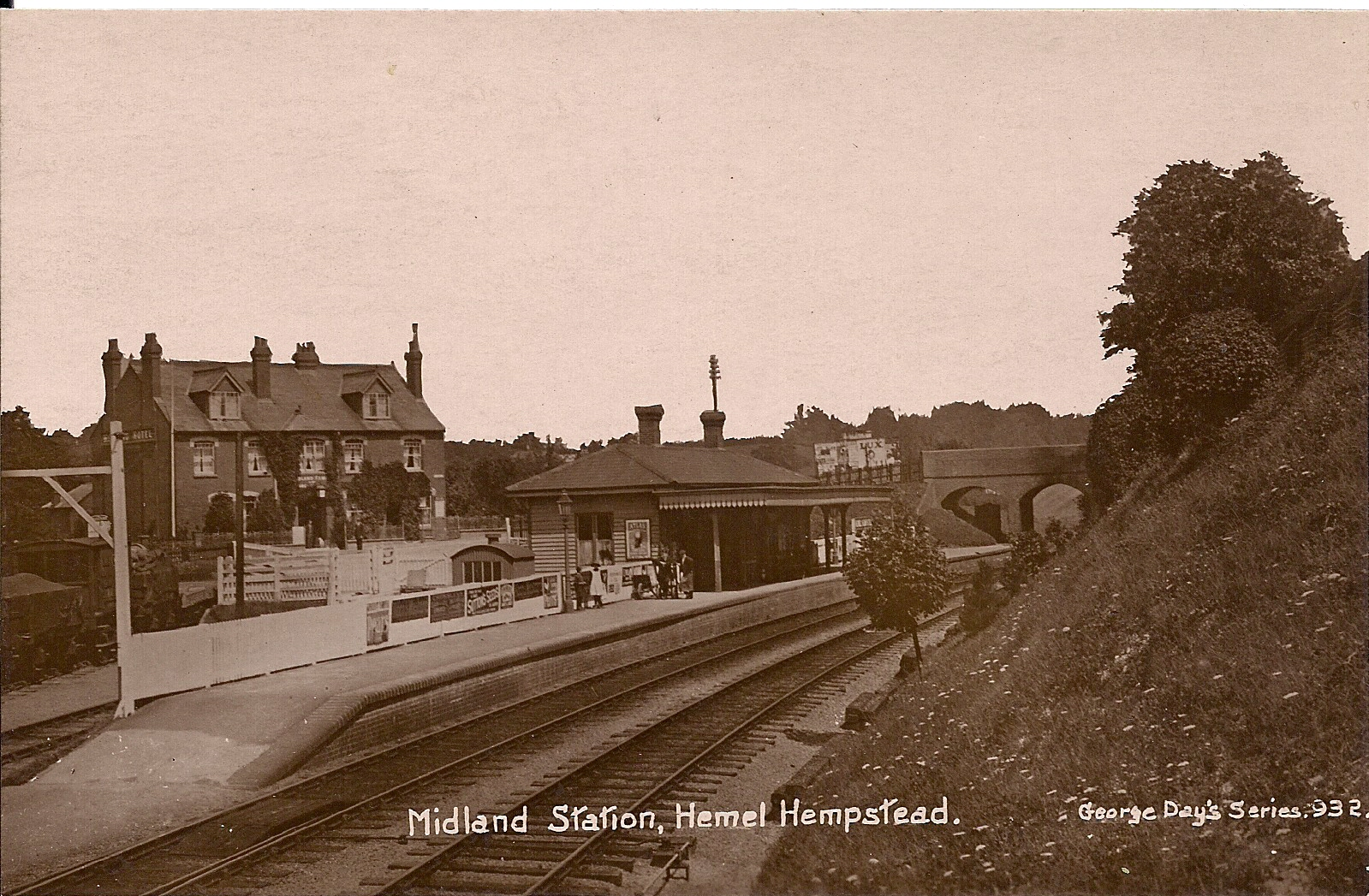
Hemel Hempsted (Midland) railway station, with the Midland Hotel in the background

Construction proceeded extremely slowly, the lower spur from Boxmoor to Hemel Hempstead only being completed by 1871, though the connection to Boxmoor was via an awkward turntable arrangement. Eventually, the HH&L&NWR company ran into financial difficulties and it was the Midland Railway that came to the rescue, financing completion of the line and agreeing to operate it once it was built. At this time, the transporting of goods and coal was the primary driving factor in the development of railways rather than commuter rail. The thriving hat making industry in Luton created demand for a transport link with the straw plait trade that existed in Hemel and, as a result, the initial connection with the MR at Harpenden headed north towards Luton rather than south towards London. Passengers travelling on this route changed trains at Chiltern Green to reach London. The connection to the GNR's line at Harpenden East was never achieved.

The line was finally opened on 16 July 1877 to great fanfare with celebrations led by the Berkhamsted Rifle Corps Band. A special train was laid on from Hemel to Luton and champagne receptions were held in Luton and Hemel town halls. Church bells were rung and a banner hung across Alexandra Road in Hemel proclaimed "Success to the Hemel Hemptead and Midland Railway Company."

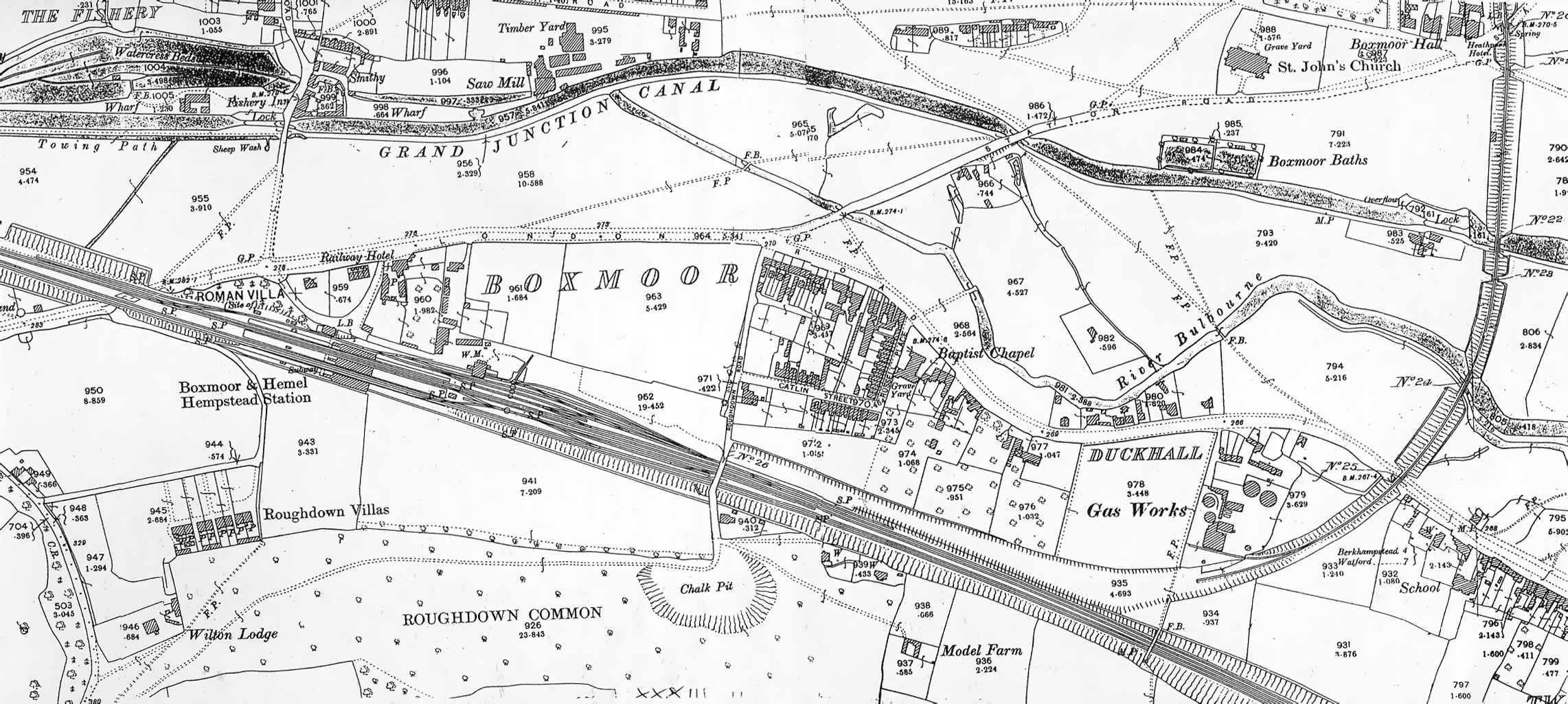
A 1898 map of Boxmoor railway station and goods yard; the Nickey line and gasworks can be seen on the right

When it opened, the new line did not extend as far as Boxmoor, but terminated in Hemel Hempstead. Relations between the Hemel Hempstead Company and the LNWR (which had absorbed the London and Birmingham Railway in 1846) were difficult. The LNWR regarded the Hemel Hemptead and Midland Railway route to St Pancras as a threat to their service into Euston. The two companies could not reach an agreement to connect the Nickey line to the LNWR main line because of this intense rivalry. Instead, the southern terminus for the Hemel line was originally Hemel Hempsted (known locally as the Midland Station), and this served as the main passenger facility within the town. This railway station stood at the junction of Midland Road and Adeyfield Road, opposite the Midland Hotel; today, the site is occupied by a modern housing development, although the hotel still exists.

The section of line south of this remained disused until 1880, when the Midland Railway opened the line to provide coal trains to the Duckhall gasworks near to Boxmoor. A connection was constructed as far as the LNWR sidings at Boxmoor; the Nickey line ran along a cutting, rising up to the main line level and under the northernmost arch of the Roughdown Road bridge. A Midland Railway trespass notice was affixed to this bridge, indicating the limit of extent of the company's property. For a few years, the Nickey Line was connected to the Boxmoor goods yard via a turntable, but the LNWR removed it in 1897, severing the connection with the main line.

Rivalry between the LNWR and the Midland Railway grew intense in the 1880s. On one occasion, when a Midland Railway locomotive entered the LNWR siding at Boxmoor, the track was lifted by angry LNWR workers to prevent it from completing it journey. The LNWR began to operate a regular horse-drawn omnibus service to transport passengers from the town centre to the main line station at Boxmoor, where they could take trains to London Euston. These passengers were able to reach London St Pancras more quickly via the Hemel Hempstead Company's line. Competition increased further when the Hemel Hempstead Motor Car Company started to run a motor bus service to Boxmoor, and this was later taken on by the LNWR in place of its equestrian service. In 1906 the Midland Railway extended passenger services along the Nickey line as far as Heath Park Halt, a high-level railway station which was located on a viaduct extending across Marlowes, close to the present-day site of the former Kodak headquarters building. Additional halts were built on the line at Beaumont's Halt and Godwin's Halt.

Eventually, the straw plait trade declined and the need for goods trains gave way to passenger demand; local businessmen wanted a fast route into London without having to go via Luton. In order to help the line pay its way, the junction at Harpenden was realigned in 1888 so that it headed south instead of north; passengers now changed trains at Harpenden Junction.

=== Stations ===
The full list of stations on the route is:

Station	Location	Opened	Closed to passengers	Fully closed
Harpenden	51.814852°N 0.351577°W	1868	-	-
Roundwood Halt	51.820066°N 0.369909°W	1927	1947	1979
Redbourn	51.796457°N 0.390966°W	1877	1947	1979
Beaumont's Halt	51.789181°N 0.409038°W	1905	1947	1979
Godwin's Halt	51.767723°N 0.451897°W	1905	1947	1964
Hemel Hempsted (Midland Railway)	51.755748°N 0.466565°W	1877	1947	1963
Heath Park Halt	51.74458°N 0.475351°W	1905	1947	1959
Gasworks Siding	51.740468°N 0.478261°W	1880	-	1959
Boxmoor (goods)	51.741936°N 0.488508°W	1959†	-	-

† Nickey line goods service for 6 months only

Heath Park Halt was the terminus for passenger services, which opened on 9 August 1905. Passenger services were withdrawn 16 June 1947 and the railway station closed with the line in 1959. Nothing of the station now remains, although its site may be seen at the junction of St. John's Road and Corner Hall Road with Station Road. A combined iron drinking fountain and gas lamp still stands near the site of the now demolished Heath Park Hotel, which had stood directly opposite the railway station.

== Grouping ==
After the First World War, Britain's railway companies were failing commercially and making losses. In 1923, the railways were merged into the "Big Four" in the Grouping of the British railway companies. Former competitors, Midland and LNWR, were absorbed into the London, Midland and Scottish Railway (LMS); the Nickey line and the neighbouring main lines at Boxmoor and Harpenden all became part of the same organisation. A new railway station was opened at Roundwood Halt in 1927.

== Ro-Railer trials ==
The LMS also inherited the bus service which the LNWR had been running from into Hemel town centre; rather than transfer passenger traffic to the Nickey line, the LMS decided to extend the bus service to run from Boxmoor to Harpenden instead, duplicating the railway route which it then reduced to two trains per day.

In 1930, the LMS experimented with new transport technology in an attempt to reduce costs and to rationalise its bus and rail operation through Hemel Hempstead. The Nickey line was used to trial a hybrid road–rail vehicle system called the "Ro-Railer", a bus that could travel on both roads and railways. The experiment was short-lived and did not catch on.

== Decline and closure ==
Passenger demand was never high and further declined during the inter-war years. The rivalry between the Midland and LNWR railway companies had ensured that the line ultimately failed to serve the people of Hemel Hempstead in the most useful way possible; the bus service continued under the LMS had shifted passenger demand away from the railway and onto the road. By the end of 1946, the only regular rail passengers on the Harpenden service were six schoolchildren. The LMS also moved its main goods operation from Hemel Hempstead to Boxmoor; it was only the demand for coal supplies to the Duckhall gasworks that kept the Nickey line operational. During the harsh winter of 1946–47, a national coal shortage hit the British economy and passenger trains were "temporarily" suspended. As it turned out, the service was never to be reinstated and the last passenger service on the Nickey line ran on 16 June 1947.

In 1948, the nationalisation of the railways was enacted; the LMS and other railway companies were absorbed into the new state-owned corporation British Railways. Goods traffic continued to decline on the Nickey line and, in 1959, the stretch of track between Hemel Hempsted railway station and the Duckhall gasworks was taken over by the Hemel Hempstead New Town Development Corporation. Hemel had been designated for redevelopment as a New Town in post-Second World War regeneration; plans were in place to demolish the viaduct crossing the lower end of Marlowes, severing the Nickey line link with the Midland Main Line. In order to maintain the supply of coal to the gasworks, new track was laid at Boxmoor joining the Nickey line to the West Coast Main Line, via a siding. The connection of the Nickey line to the former LNWR line, which had so long been a bone of contention among competing railway companies, was finally achieved. It was not to last long; this service ran for all of six months in 1959 before the gasworks shut down and the link was closed. A year later, on 2 July 1960, the Marlowes railway viaduct was demolished and the removal of the Nickey Line had begun. Many people turned out to witness the demolition of this local landmark and the event was well recorded in photographs.

The closure of the remaining parts of the line continued in stages; Hemel Hempsted railway station closed in 1963, followed by Godwin's Halt in 1964; cuttings were filled in and commercial buildings and housing estates were built on the former railway land. The line between Cupid Green (north of Godwin's Halt) and Harpenden survived for some more years, however, having been leased by British Rail in 1968 to the Hemelite concrete company who continued to use the line privately to transport raw materials for manufacturing building blocks via Harpenden to their works at Claydale. Hemelite's goods operations continued on this line until British Rail decided that the branch line should close. The junction with the Midland Main Line at Harpenden Junction was severed on 1 July 1979. The last journey on the line was made by a Hemelite Drewry locomotive, which was taken off the tracks at Redbourn and transported by lorry to work on the Yorkshire Dales Railway. Track lifting was undertaken in 1982, with the trackbed being converted into a public footpath in the following year.

It is notable that, prior to Hemel Hempstead being chosen as the site for a new town, Redbourn was also considered. Had this occurred, then the Nickey line would have been significantly upgraded to provide a link between the West Coast Main Line at Hemel Hempstead and a new railway station at Redbourn.

== Preservation ==
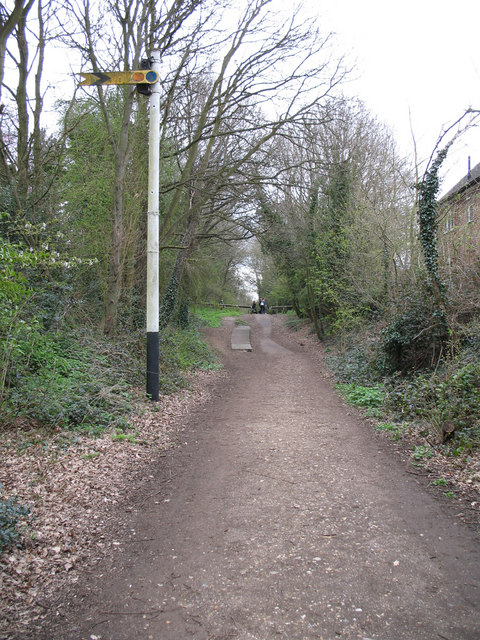
The Nickey Line path, looking north-east at Roundwood Halt

The course of most of the railway has been redeveloped as a shared-use path by St Albans District Council and Dacorum Borough Council. It was opened in 1985, as the Nicky Line, though later corrected to the Nickey Line. It is part of Route 57 of the National Cycle Network (the Oxford to Welwyn Garden City route) and is approximately 8 miles (13 km) long.

Since much redevelopment of the town took place subsequent to its closure, the course of the lower part of the line is hard to follow nowadays. The course of the connection from Boxmoor is discernible in places; the gasholders at Duckhall are still present and the boundaries delineate the curve of the original trackbed. The abutment of the bridge that crossed the A41 is still present on the northern side, followed by a few hundred yards of heavily wooded embankment which still have one or two remaining sleepers. Remains of the brick-built bridges crossing the Bulbourne and Grand Union Canal are indistinct but discernible, but the remainder of the embankment to Heath Park has been levelled and landscaped as a public park and cricket pitches.

From Heath Park, the line went roughly to the site of the present day "Magic Roundabout", where it crossed the lower end of Marlowes over a viaduct. From there, it followed a course roughly where the modern day Maynard Road runs (an unsurfaced car park locates a 200m section of the former railway), through the site of Hemel Hempstead Hospital (the hospital existed when the railway was active, but was far smaller; the line passed to its east), through the housing developments of Concorde Drive (the former Hemel Hempstead (Midland) Station), to cross under Midland Road next to the Midland Hotel.

From this point, the course of the line is easier to follow, as much of it still exists as footpaths. The Midland Road bridge is still extant, though now largely buried. The line can be traced easily across Keen's Fields, to cross Queensway on a high-level brick arch bridge which is still complete. From there, the line tracks through Highfield and the course follows a well-maintained path all the way up to Cupid Green. This part of the line once again becomes obscured by modern developments, such as a car dealership and a modern industrial estate. Here once stood Godwin's Halt, a very minor railway station named for a former landowner of the area. The original bridge at Godwins Halt remains, though again largely filled in. It carries a footpath between Highfield and Pennine Way, which is a lane predating the redevelopment of Hemel Hempstead new town.

The line becomes easier to follow a few hundred yards further on, since this part of the line was open until 1979. From here, the line crosses largely open country, roughly parallel with the main Redbourn road. Most bridges are still intact and have been maintained as part of the cycle route. The modern Redbourn by-pass, built in the 1980s, cuts across the route several times and there are no separate bridges. The wrought iron bridge carrying the line across the A5 at Redbourn remains intact. This bridge is of a type identical to those originally crossing the Bulbourne and the canal at Boxmoor. There was once a railway station at Redbourn, just beyond this point, but very little evidence of this remains; the site is marked with an information board today. The route then crosses more open countryside, including fields belonging to the Rothamsted Experimental Station, to Harpenden, where it crosses over the main London road on a brick arch bridge, to connect with the Midland Main Line. The course of the original connection towards Luton is also discernible.

== See also ==
- List of closed railway stations in Britain
- List of rail trails
- Stanmore branch line, a closed line that ran from Harrow and Wealdstone, about 12.25 miles (19.71 km) further down the line from Boxmoor
