= Berkhamsted railway station =

Railway station in Hertfordshire, England

Coordinates: 51.763°N 0.562°W

Berkhamsted
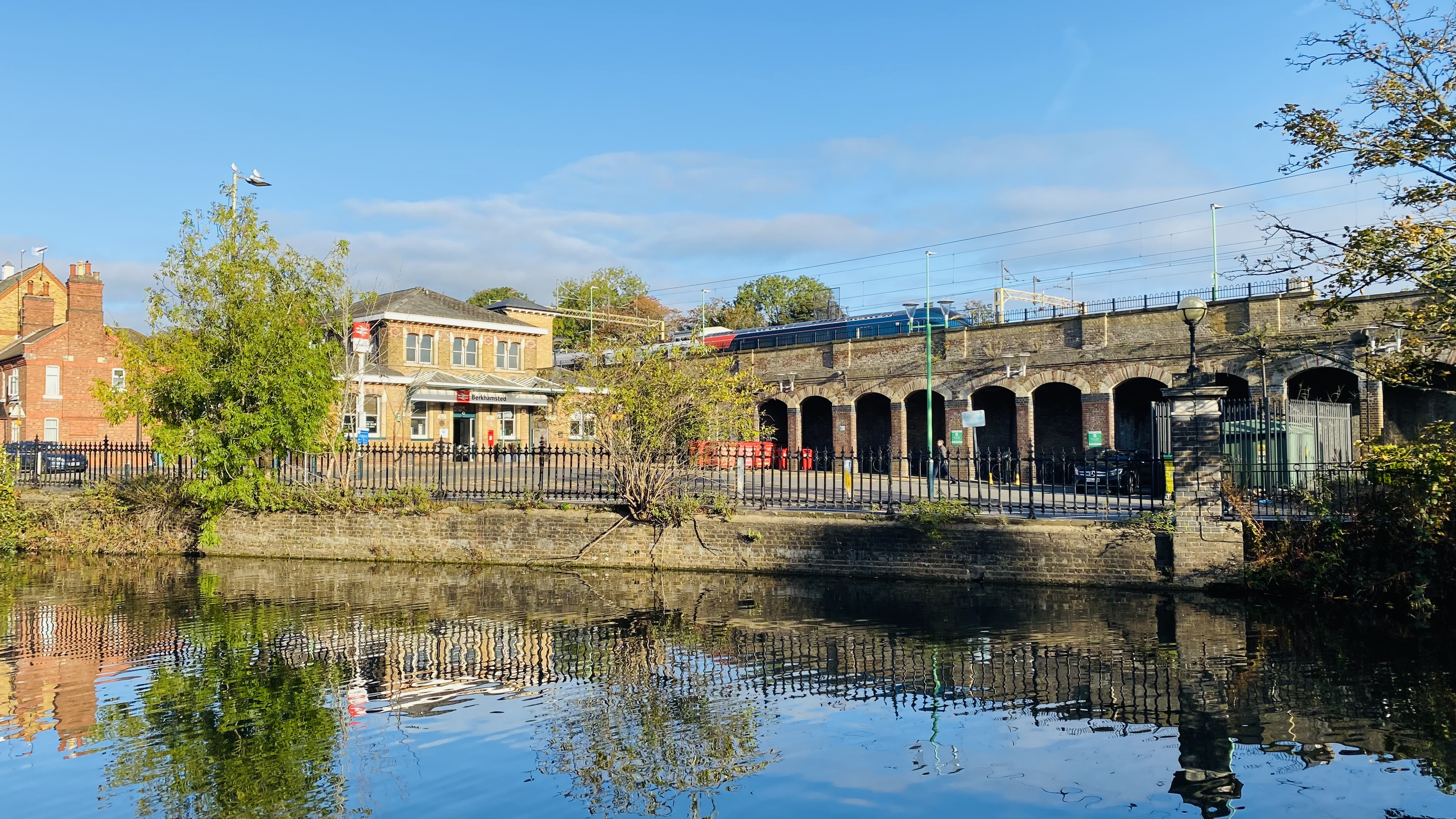
- Main entrance, with Grand Union canal in foreground

General information
- Location: Berkhamsted, Borough of Dacorum; England
- Grid reference: SP993081
- Manager: London Northwestern Railway
- Platforms: 4

Other information
- Station code: BKM
- Classification: DfT category C2

History
- Opened: 1838

Key dates
- 1875: relocated to present site

Passengers
- 2021/22: ▲0.784 million
- 2022/23: ▲1.023 million
- 2023/24: ▲1.170 million
- 2024/25: ▲1.323 million
- 2025/26: ▲1.454 million
Location
Notes
- Passenger statistics from the Office of Rail and Road

Berkhamsted railway station is in the historic market town of Berkhamsted, Hertfordshire, England. It is located just beside Berkhamsted Castle, overlooking the Grand Junction Canal. The station is 28 miles (45 km) north west of London Euston on the West Coast Main Line. London Northwestern Railway operates services to London, Northampton and many other destinations.

There are four platforms of 12-car length on both the fast and slow lines. The platforms are arranged around a central island and two side platforms, although in practice, only two of these are in common use, which are platforms 3 and 4 facing the slow lines. The station is relatively unusual on the route in that most of the original buildings have been retained.

== History ==
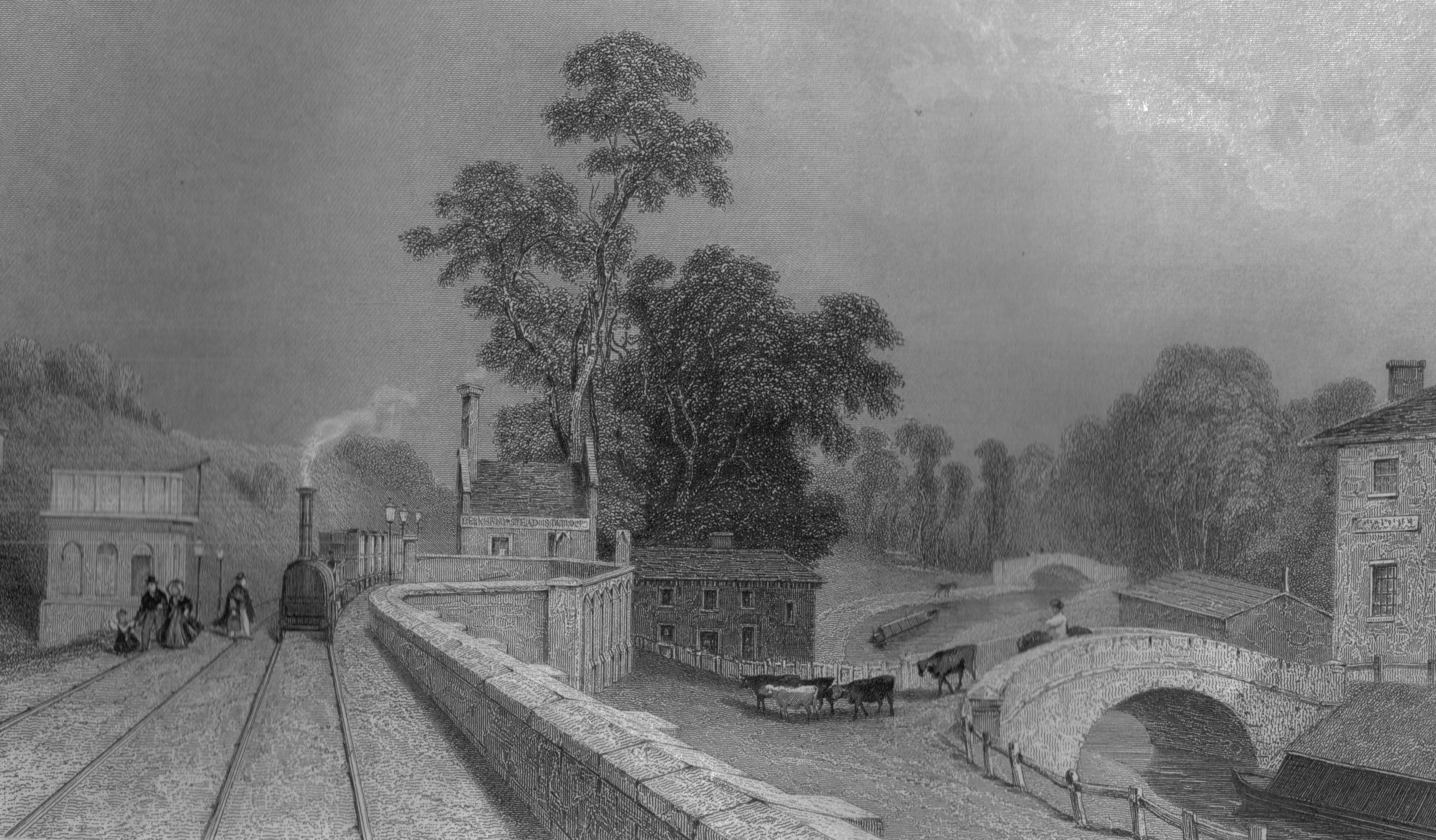
The original Berkhampstead (sic) railway station as seen in 1838

The present Berkhamsted station dates from 1875, and is located on the Lower King's road on the junction with Brownlow Road. The original station building, opened in 1838, was located approximately 330 feet (100 m) south-east of the present structure, near the bridge onto Castle Street. It was designed in an Elizabethan style of architecture with a brick gabled booking hall. The building was replaced by a new station with additional sidings in 1875 when the railway was widened, the sidings replacing an earlier goods yard near Gravel Path. In 1887, the fastest train would depart at 08:54 and arrive at London Euston at 09:35, with one stop at Willesden Junction, a 41-minute journey.

During the building of the London and Birmingham Railway (the L&BR, today's West Coast Main Line) in the 1830s, Berkhamsted was for a few years a centre of railway construction. The armies of navvies, bricklayers and miners brought in from the English Midlands, Ireland, London and the North of England led to overcrowding in Berkhamsted and the rowdy behaviour of the labourers was said to have offended the genteel townsfolk. Seven young men aged 18–26 were killed while working on the Berkhamsted section of the railway.

Before construction work on the Berkhamsted section of the L&BR began, the project was subject to public protest. Many landowners and turnpike trustees in Hertfordshire were opposed to the new railway line, and protest meetings were held at the King's Arms Hotel in Berkhamsted. Although local opposition to the iron horse was led by noblemen such as the Earls of Essex, Clarendon and Brownlow, the railway line received Royal Assent in 1833.

Led by chief engineer Robert Stephenson, works commenced in 1834 to build a high railway embankment on top of the ruined barbican and moat of Berkhamsted Castle. The brick embankment was built on deep foundations using earth taken from the Sunnyside cutting a mile further south. Once railway tracks were laid, it was possible to use a steam locomotive to move earth and bricks: the Harvey Coombe (or Harvey Combe) was brought up from London by barge on the Grand Junction Canal to assist construction work, and was assembled at Pix Farm in Bourne End.

The L&BR line opened in 1837, with trains running between London and Boxmoor in July, with service extended to Tring in October of that year. The first passenger train passed through Berkhamsted on 16 October 1837, 59 minutes after leaving London.

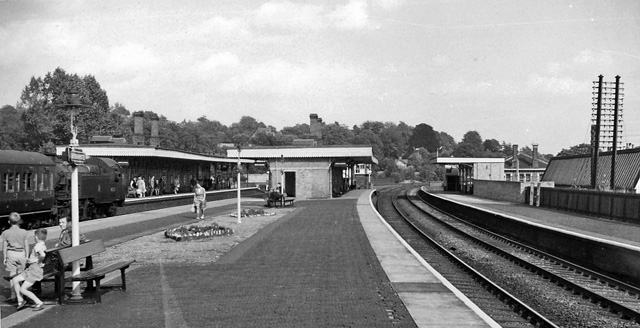
Berkhamsted Station in 1961

=== Extension plans ===
Various plans were put forward in the 1880s by the LNWR (successor to the L&BR) to build a branch line from Berkhamsted to Chesham, but these were not realised. The Great Central Railway also considered a proposal to extend the branch from Chalfont Road to Chesham further north to Berkhamsted and Tring. This proposal was abandoned.

In 1887 there was a proposal to build a narrow-gauge steam tramway along the main road from Hemel Hempstead to Bourne End, and then along the Bourne Gutter Valley to Chesham. Campaigners sought to extend this route via Berkhamsted, but the project also came to nothing.

=== Development ===
In 2013, as part of its "Access for All" programme, Network Rail and London Midland began construction work to install lifts to provide access for disabled passengers to platforms, as required by the Disability Discrimination Act 1995. Three lifts were completed and eventually opened for public use on Friday 13 March 2015, serving platforms 1, 2/3 and 4.

An electrical substation was installed outside the front of the station in April 2014 to improve the electricity supply to overhead wires on the West Coast Main Line. The installation, which is enclosed by metal railings, was criticised for its appearance and prominent position in front of a Victorian railway station and in close proximity to the 11th-century Berkhamsted Castle.

== Services ==
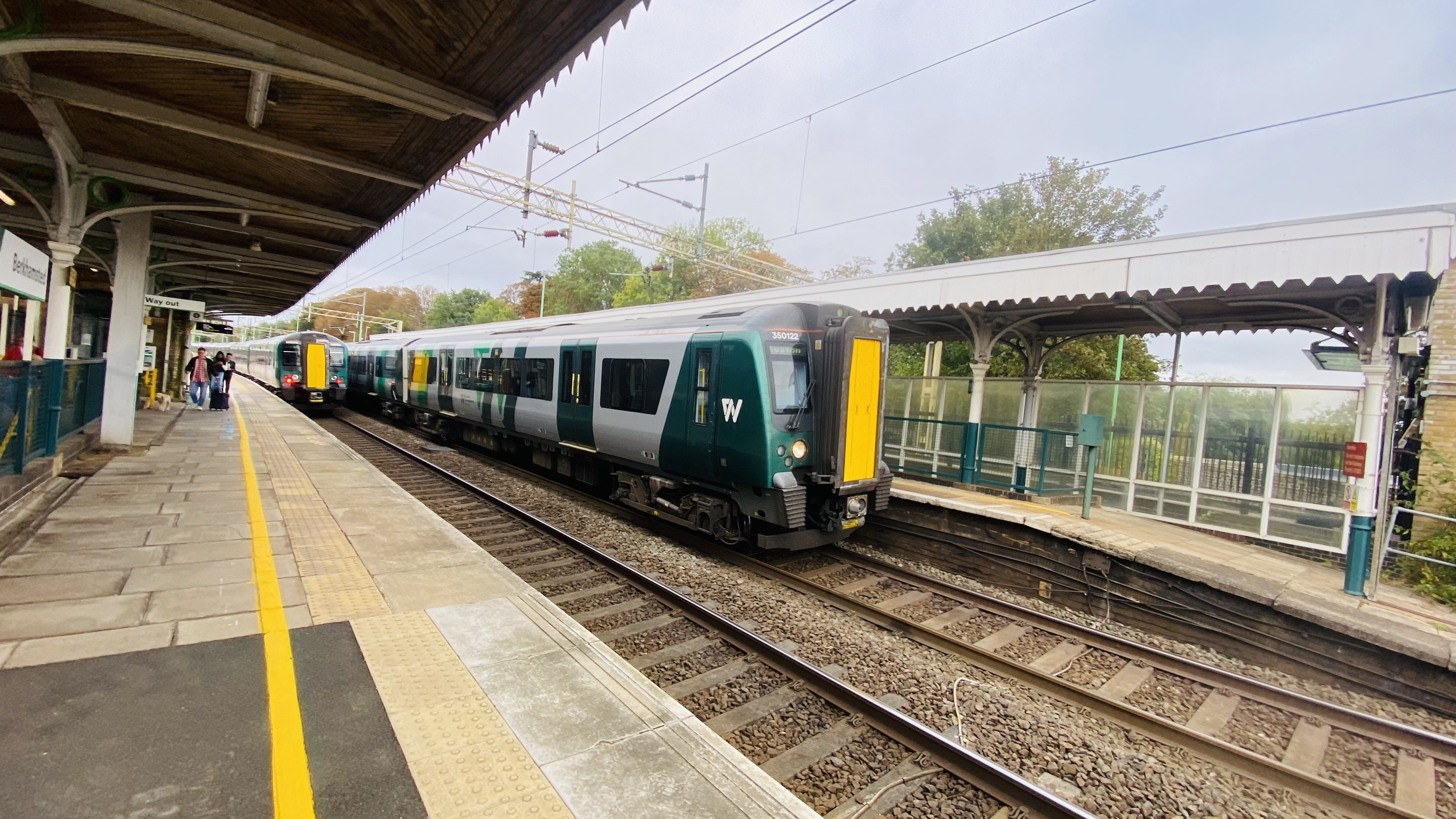
Berkhamsted is served by London Northwestern Railway

=== Current Services ===
All services at Berkhamsted are operated by London Northwestern Railway.

The typical off-peak service in trains per hour is: The typical off-peak service in trains per hour is:

- 4 tph to London Euston
- 2 tph to Tring
- 2 tph to Milton Keynes Central

During the peak hours, a number of additional services between London Euston, Tring and Bletchley call at the station.

A number of early morning and late evening services are extended beyond Milton Keynes Central to and from Northampton and Birmingham New Street.

On Sundays, the station is served by a half-hourly service between London Euston and Milton Keynes Central.

=== Former Services ===
==== Connex South Central ====
In June 1997, Connex South Central began operating services between Gatwick Airport and Rugby via the Brighton and West London Lines that called at Berkhamsted with Class 319s. The company lost its franchise in October 2000.

==== Southern ====
Southern reintroduced the service in February 2009 with Class 377s operating initially operating from Brighton to Milton Keynes before being curtailed at its southern end at South Croydon and later Clapham Junction. In May 2022, Southern cut the service back to terminate at Watford Junction and thus ceased to serve Berkhamsted.

Preceding station	National Rail	Following station
Tring towards Milton Keynes Central	London Northwestern Railway London–Milton Keynes	Hemel Hempstead towards London Euston
Tring Terminus	London Northwestern Railway London–Milton Keynes	Hemel Hempstead towards London Euston
Former services
Tring	Southern West London Line	Hemel Hempstead

==== Crossrail ====
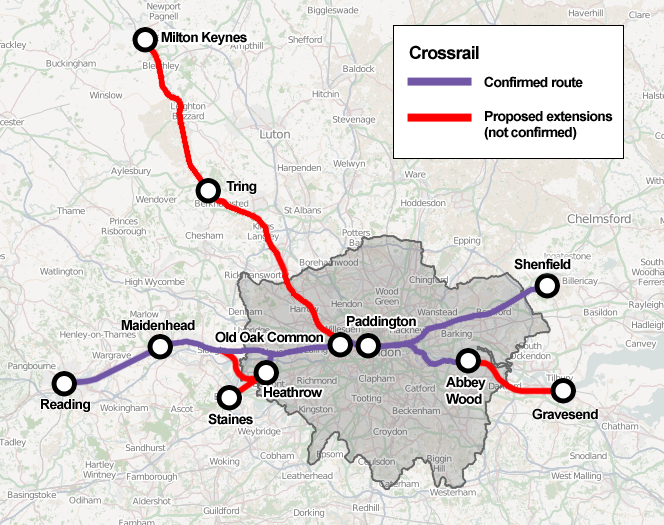
Outline map of an abandoned proposal to extend the Elizabeth Line into Hertfordshire

The London and South East Route Utilisation Strategy document published by Network Rail in July 2011 made recommendations for the Crossrail lines which were then under construction in central London. It proposed an extension of what is now the Elizabeth line northwards into Hertfordshire via a new tunnel near Old Oak Common and Watford Junction, connecting the Crossrail route to the West Coast Main Line. Services would have run from stations in the West End of London via Berkhamsted, and would have terminated at Tring and Milton Keynes. The new alignment would have alleviated congestion at Euston and resolved capacity constraints on the Elizabeth Line, allowing trains that terminate at Paddington to continue east via the Hertfordshire branch. This proposal was abandoned in 2016.
