= Redbourn railway station =

Former railway station in Hertfordshire, England

Redbourn

General information
- Location: Redbourn, Hertfordshire; England
- Coordinates: 51.7963°N 0.3912°W
- Grid reference: TL110120
- Platforms: 1

Other information
- Status: Disused

History
- Original company: Midland Railway
- Pre-grouping: Midland Railway
- Post-grouping: London, Midland and Scottish Railway

Key dates
- 16 June 1887: Opened
- 16 June 1947: Closed to passengers
- 6 July 1964: Closed to goods
Location

Redbourn railway station was a stop on the Nickey Line, which linked Hemel Hempstead with Harpenden; it served the village of Redbourn, in Hertfordshire, England, from 1887 to 1964.

== History ==
The station was opened on 16 June 1887 by the Midland Railway. A goods yard, which had three sidings, was sited opposite to the station; two of these served the goods shed. The platform was raised by two and a half inches in 1913.

It was closed to passengers on 16 June 1947 and closed to goods on 6 July 1964. The track was lifted in 1982 and the platform was demolished shortly after.

Preceding station	Disused railways	Following station
Roundwood Halt; Line and station closed	London, Midland and Scottish Railway; Nickey Line	Beaumont's Halt; Line and station closed

== The site today ==
No evidence of the station exists today, although a wrought iron railway bridge over Redbourn High Street remains extant. A shared-use path passes through the old station site, which occupies most of the line's former trackbed.
