= Hemel Hempstead railway station =

Railway station in Hertfordshire, England

Hemel Hempstead
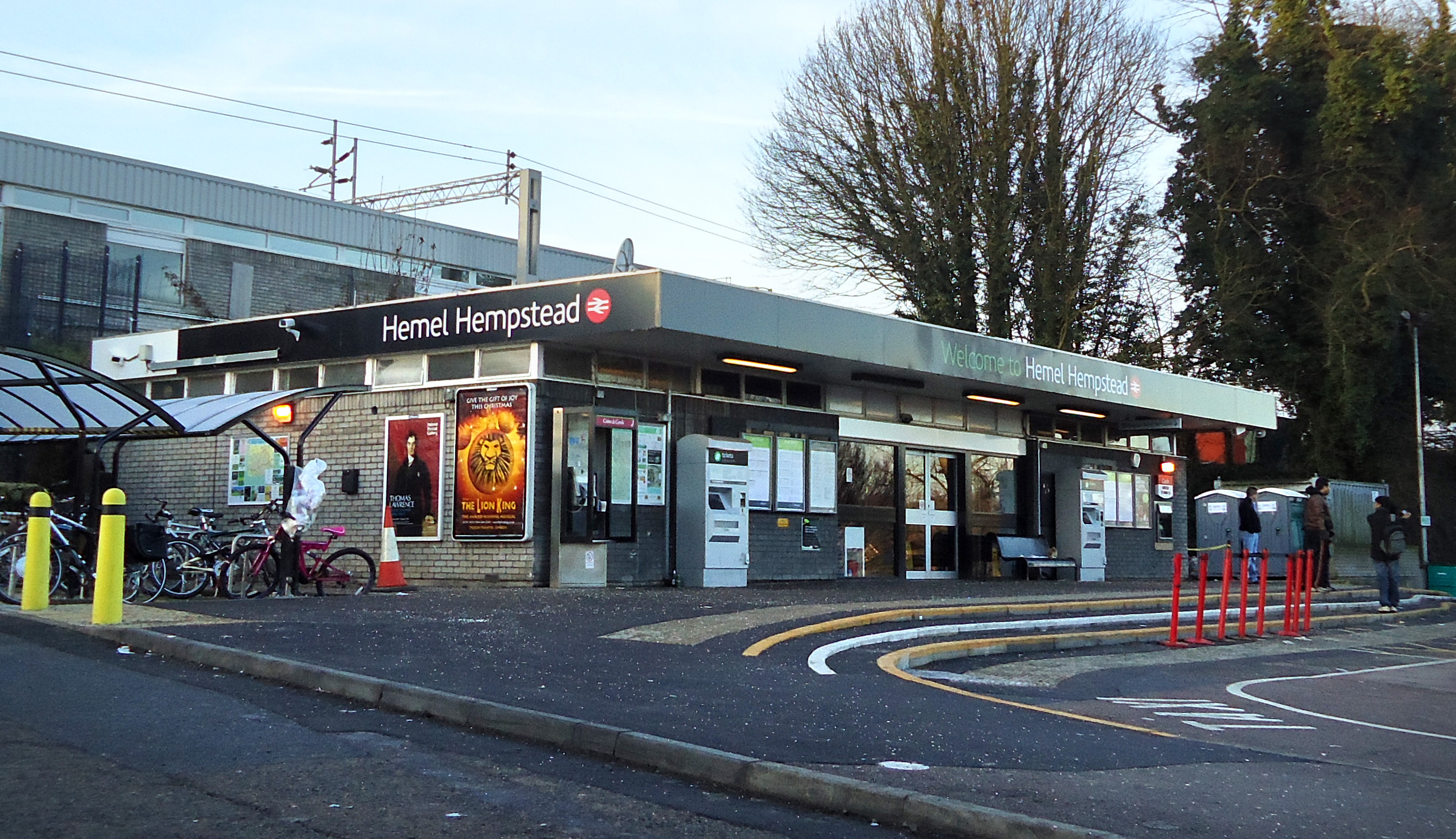

General information
- Location: Hemel Hempstead, Borough of Dacorum, England
- Coordinates: 51.742°N 0.491°W
- Grid reference: TL042059
- Manager: London Northwestern Railway
- Platforms: 4

Other information
- Station code: HML
- Classification: DfT category C2

History
- Original company: London and Birmingham Railway
- Pre-grouping: London and North Western Railway
- Post-grouping: London, Midland and Scottish Railway

Key dates
- 20 July 1837: Opened as Boxmoor
- 17 December 1912: Renamed Boxmoor and Hemel Hempstead
- 2 June 1924: Renamed Boxmoor
- 1 September 1924: Renamed Boxmoor and Hemel Hempstead
- 1 July 1930: Renamed Hemel Hempstead and Boxmoor
- 20 December 1963: Renamed Hemel Hempstead

Passengers
- 2021/22: ▲1.035 million
- 2022/23: ▲1.307 million
- 2023/24: ▲1.437 million
- 2024/25: ▲1.611 million
- 2025/26: ▲1.863 million
Location
Notes
- Passenger statistics from the Office of Rail and Road

Hemel Hempstead railway station lies in Boxmoor, on the western edge of the town of Hemel Hempstead, in Hertfordshire, England. It is located 24 1/2 miles (39 km) north-west of London Euston on the West Coast Main Line. The station is managed by London Northwestern Railway, which also operates all services from the station. There are four full-length (12-car) through platforms and one disused south-facing bay on the slow lines.

Hemel Hempstead is one of two stations that now serve the town, the other being Apsley. Both were built when the town was relatively small, before it was designated a New Town in 1946 and grew rapidly in size. Bus services run to the town centre. There are two pubs and the Grand Union Canal, sited 110 yd (100 m) away.

== History ==
Hemel Hempstead station was opened by the London and Birmingham Railway on 20 July 1837. Originally called Boxmoor station, it was the first terminus of the new line from the south, engineered by Robert Stephenson, which was subsequently extended to Tring in October of the same year and then to Birmingham in 1838.

The decision to locate the station 1 mile (1.6 km) outside Hemel Hempstead town centre was a result of the opposition faced by the L&BR during construction of the line. There were vociferous protests from local landowners who sought to protect their estates from invasion by the "iron horse", including influential figures such as the Earl of Essex (Cassiobury Estate), the Earl of Clarendon (The Grove Estate) and the eminent anatomist Sir Astley Cooper (Gadebridge Estate). Turbulent public meetings were held in Berkhamsted and Watford. In the House of Lords on 22 June 1832, Lord Brownlow of Ashridge voiced his opposition to "the forcing of the proposed railway through the land and property of so great a proportion of dissentient landowners." In order to obtain Parliamentary approval, the L&BR was forced to choose an alternative route which was less favourable to Hemel Hempstead, but satisfied Hertfordshire landowners.

In 1846, the L&BR was taken over by the London and North Western Railway (LNWR). As competition with the rival Midland Railway's new line through Hemel town centre increased, the LNWR operated a horse-drawn omnibus into the town, later replaced by a motor bus service, to poach passengers onto their own, less conveniently placed railway line.

In 1912, the LNWR renamed the station Boxmoor and Hemel Hempstead. The LNWR was absorbed into the new London, Midland and Scottish Railway (LMS) in 1923, as part of the Grouping of British railway companies. In 1930, the name was changed again to Hemel Hempstead and Boxmoor.

Following nationalisation in 1948, the station was under the ownership of the London Midland Region of British Railways. The line was electrified and the Boxmoor name was dropped in 1963; the station became known simply as Hemel Hempstead.

=== The Nickey Line ===
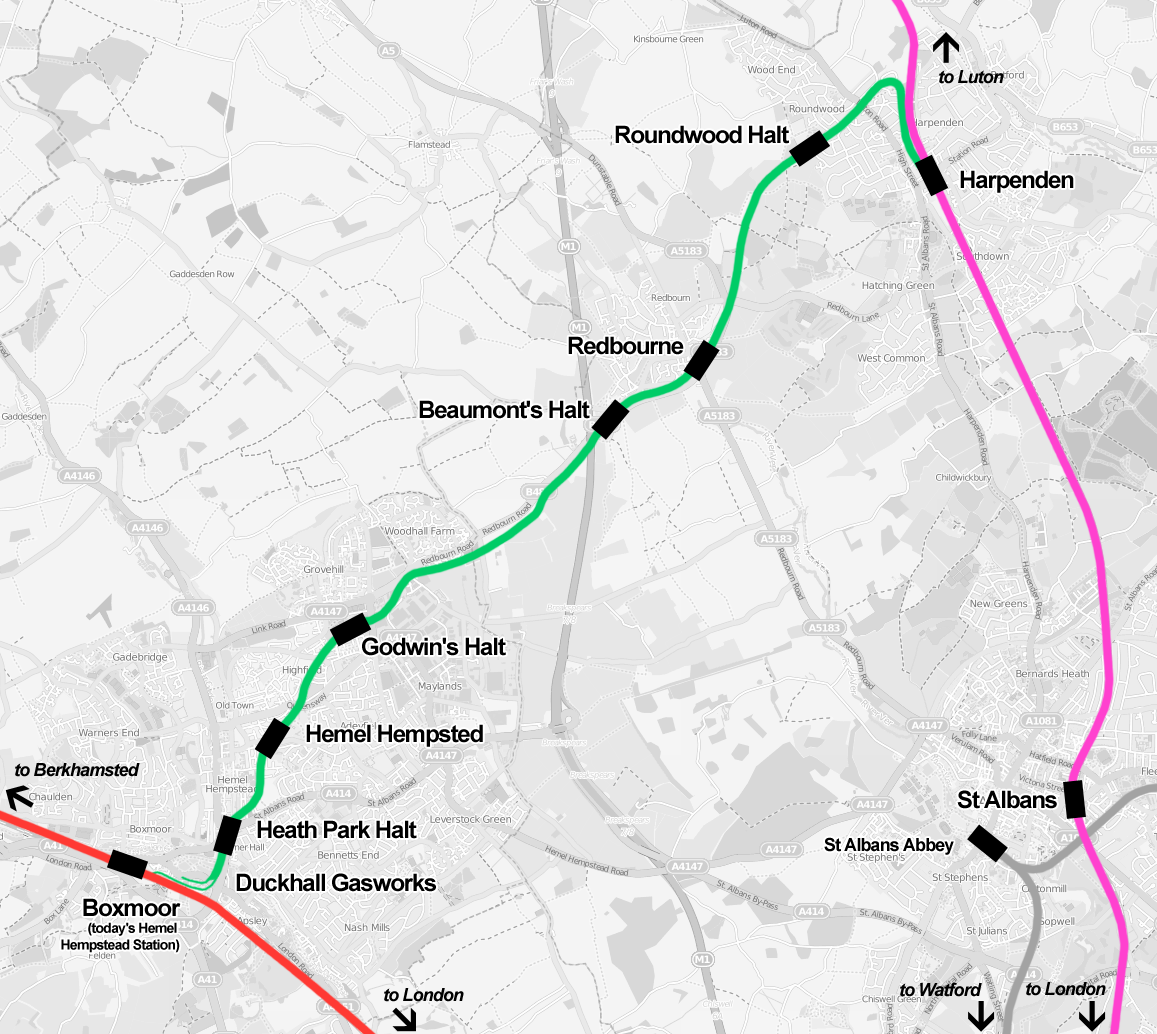
A map of the Nickey Line through Hemel Hempstead, now closed

For many years, Hemel Hempstead station was almost a junction; a railway embankment on the south (down) side of the station led to the end of the Nickey line, a branch that ran through the town centre to Harpenden. The line was opened in 1877 by the Midland Railway and extended to transport coal to Duckhall gasworks, close to Boxmoor. However, due to rivalry between the Midland Railway and the LNWR, no direct connection was made between the two lines – the Nickey Line terminated approximately 1/2 mile (0.80 km) away from Boxmoor station at the gasworks terminus. Only occasional freight trains ran this far; passenger trains terminated in the town centre at Heath Park Halt and there was also a town centre station on the line called Hemel Hempsted. (Note: Hemel Hempsted [sic] was the spelling used widely by the Midland Railway company at the time on ticketing and signage.) Passenger services ceased on the Nickey Line in 1947, although it remained in use as a goods line.

It was only in the last months of the Nickey Line's operations that a railway link was built at Boxmoor. Hemel Hempstead had been designated as a New Town and the town centre redevelopment plans included the demolition of the Nickey Line. In order to maintain a coal service to the gasworks, a link was built in 1959 connecting the Nickey Line to the West Coast Main Line, via sidings at Boxmoor. This link was for goods trains only and no passenger service was ever provided, but it only remained in operation for six months; the gasworks shut down and the link was closed. The following year, the railway viaduct over Marlowe's in the town centre was demolished, removing Hemel Hempstead's last town centre railway link.

The nearby crossover at Bourne End was the site of a serious accident on 30 September 1945, when a Scottish express derailed after passing over the junction at excessive speed. The coaches rolled down a high embankment and forty-three people died.

The Nickey Line at Boxmoor

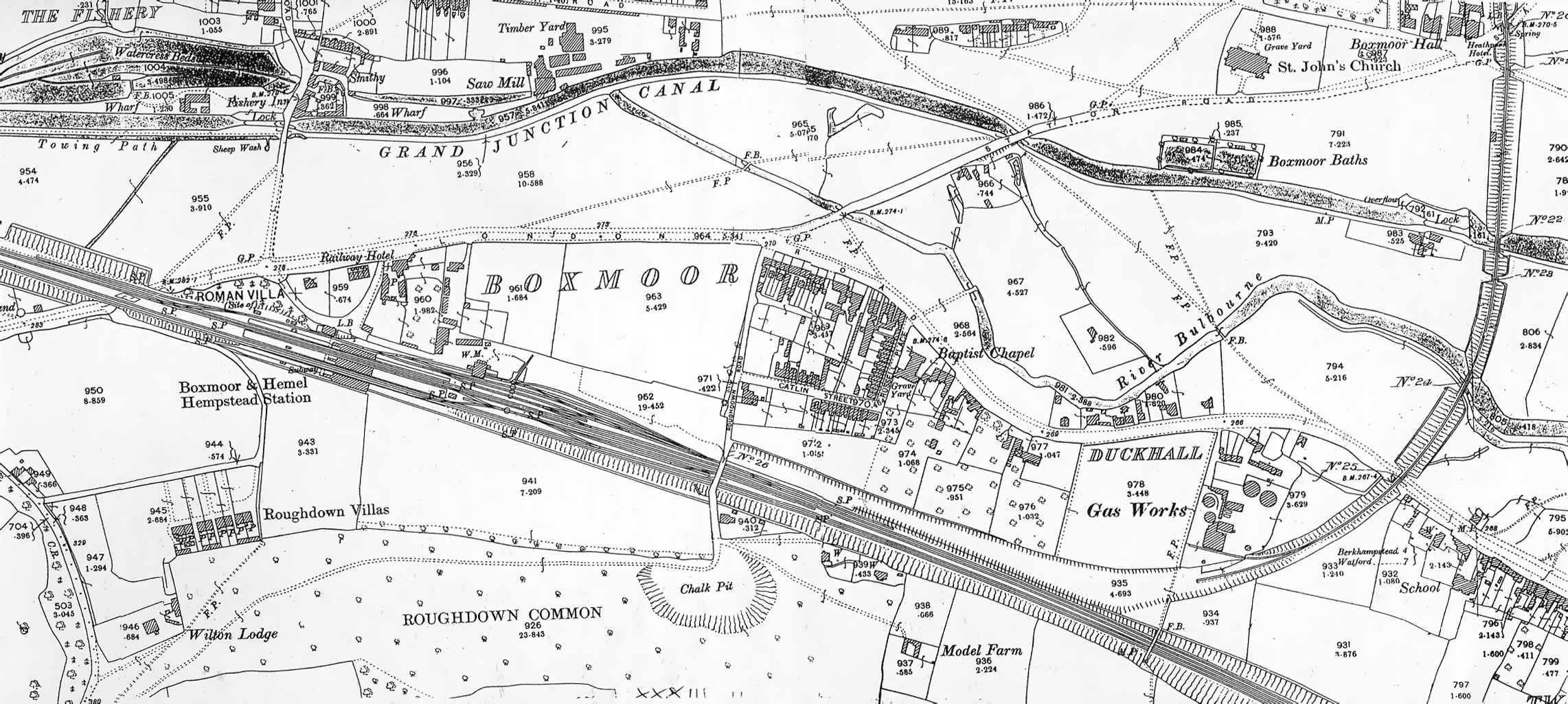
An 1898 OS map shows the southern extend of the Nickey Line, which terminated 1/2 mile (0.80 km) away from Boxmoor station; a main line link opened in 1959, which only lasted for six months

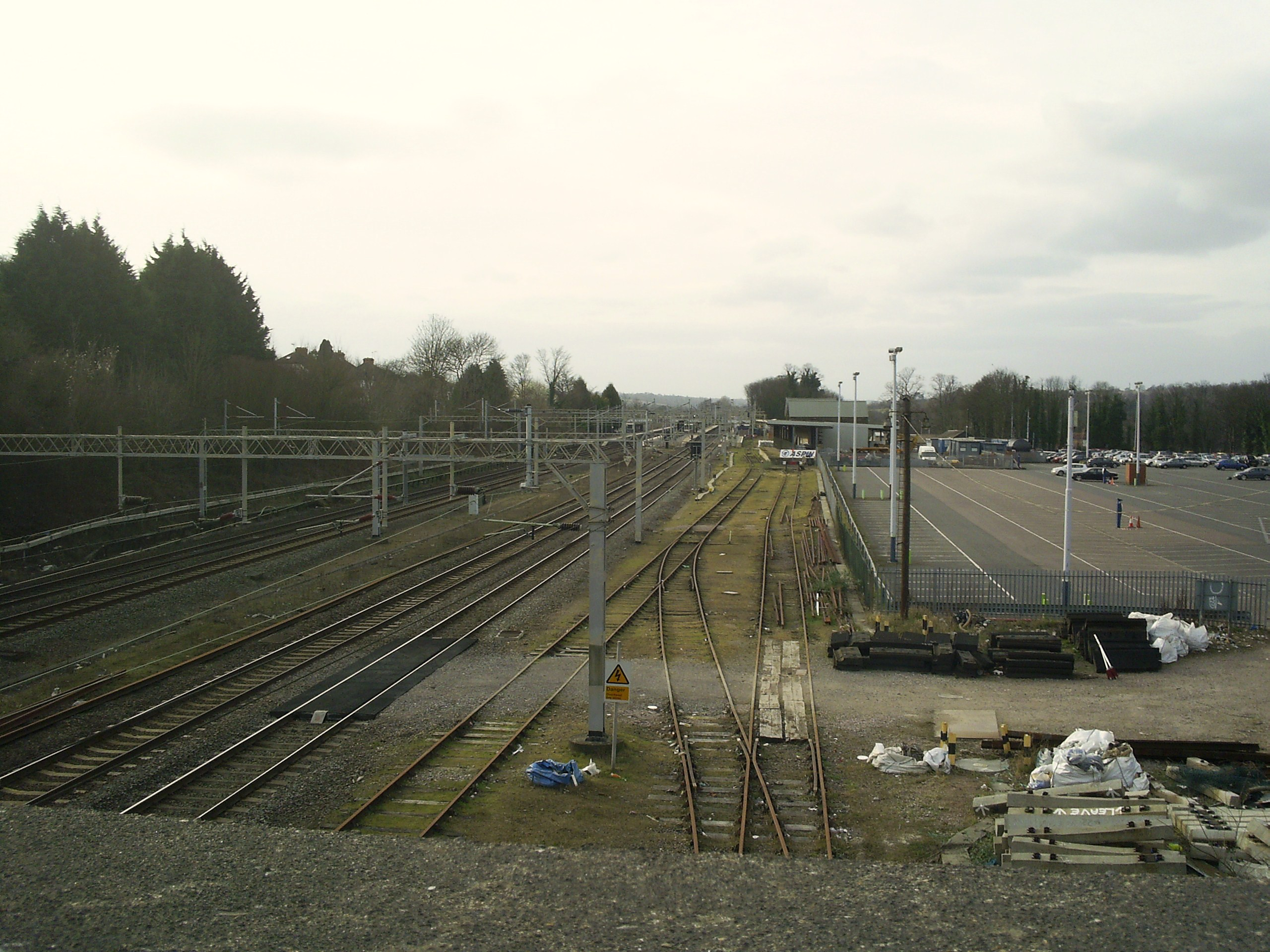
The sidings at Boxmoor, looking north

== Services ==
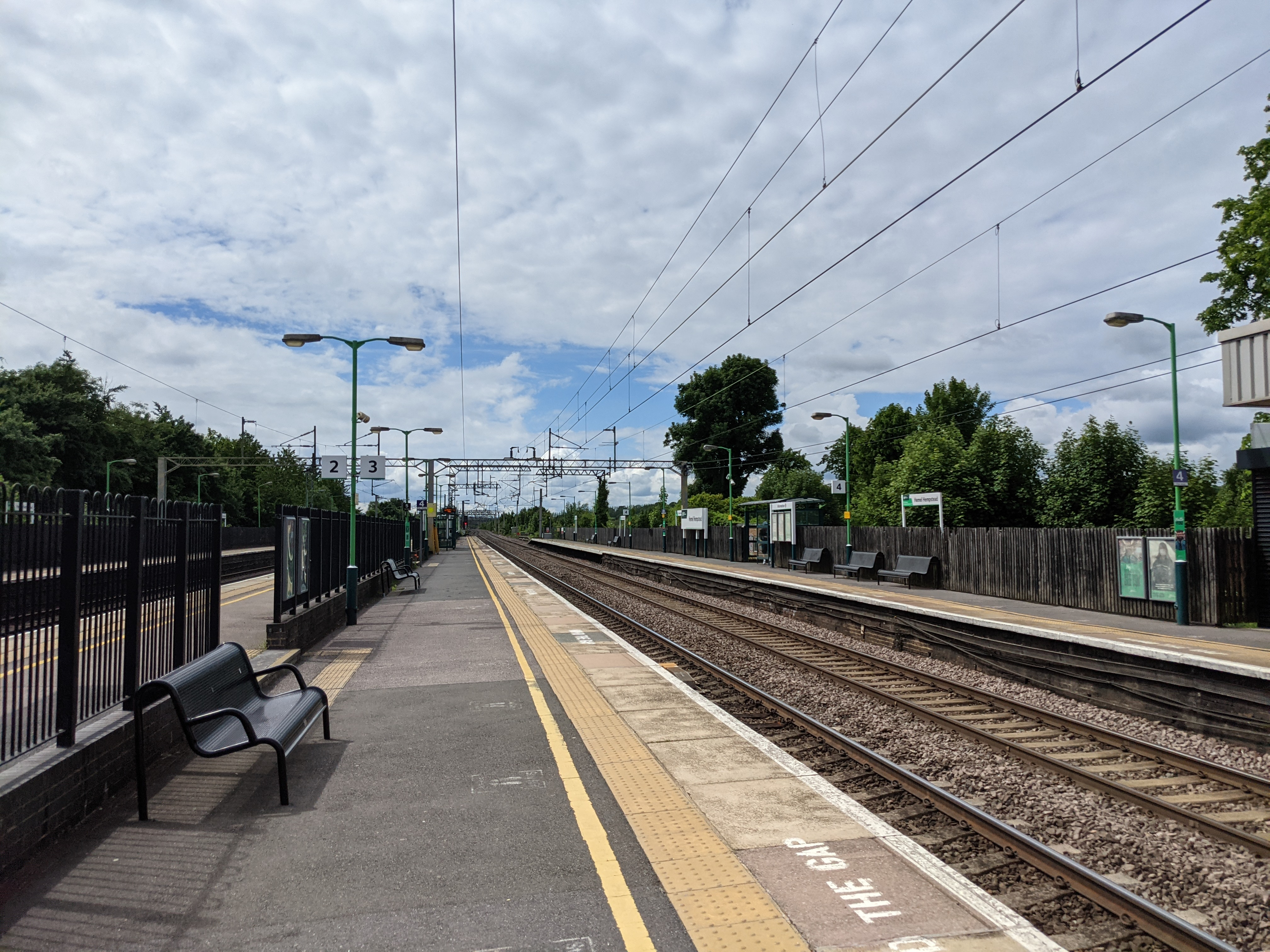
Platforms 2, 3 and 4

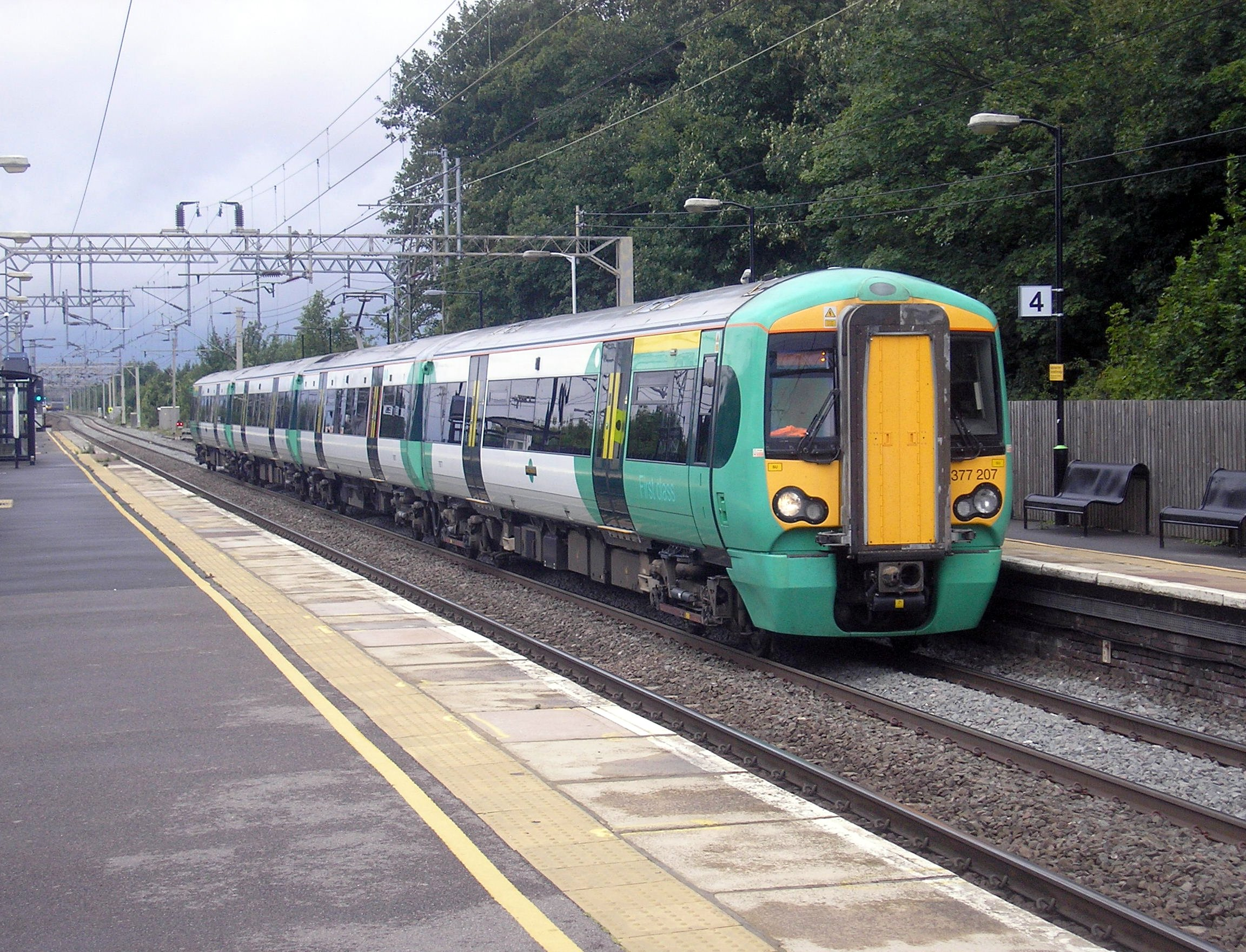
A Southern Class 377 arrives at the station, August 2010.

Services at Hemel Hempstead are operated by London Northwestern Railway; the typical off-peak service in trains per hour (tph) is:

- 4 tph to London Euston
- 2 tph to Tring
- 2 tph to Milton Keynes Central.

A number of early morning and late evening services are extended beyond Milton Keynes Central to and from Northampton and Birmingham New Street.

On Sundays, the station is served by a half-hourly service between London Euston and Milton Keynes Central.

Preceding station	National Rail	Following station
Berkhamsted towards	London Northwestern Railway London-Milton Keynes	Apsley towards
Berkhamsted towards	London Northwestern Railway London-Milton Keynes	Watford Junction towards
