= Midland Railway Johnson 0-6-0 =

Class of steam locomotives

The Midland Railway Johnson 0-6-0s were an array of locomotive classes serving Britain's Midland Railway system in the late 19th and early 20th centuries. Between 1875 and 1908 the Midland Railway, under the control of locomotive superintendents Samuel Waite Johnson and Richard Deeley, ordered 935 goods tender engines of 0-6-0 type, both from the railway's own shops at Derby and various external suppliers. Although there were many (mostly small) variations between different batches both as delivered and as successively rebuilt, all 935 can be regarded as a single series, one of the largest classes of engine on Britain's railways. The locomotives served as late as 1964, but none of them were preserved.

== Builders ==
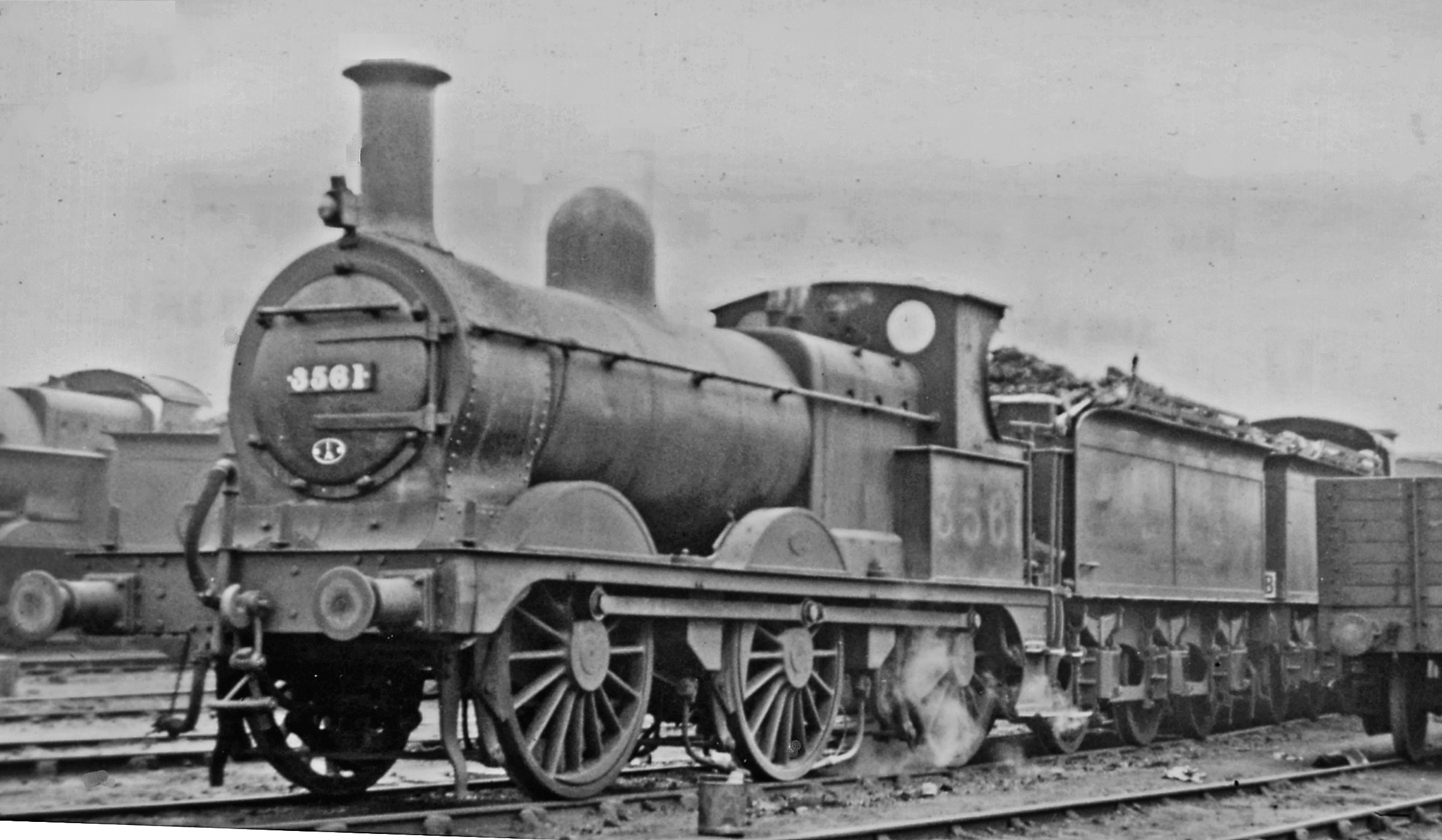
Ex-Midland 2F No. 3561 at Willesden Locomotive Depot 27 April 1946

They were built at the following plants:

Derby Works	160
Beyer, Peacock and Company	80
Dübs and Company	150
Kitson and Company	120
Neilson and Company	290
Robert Stephenson and Company	30
Sharp, Stewart and Company	85
Vulcan Foundry	20

== Boilers ==
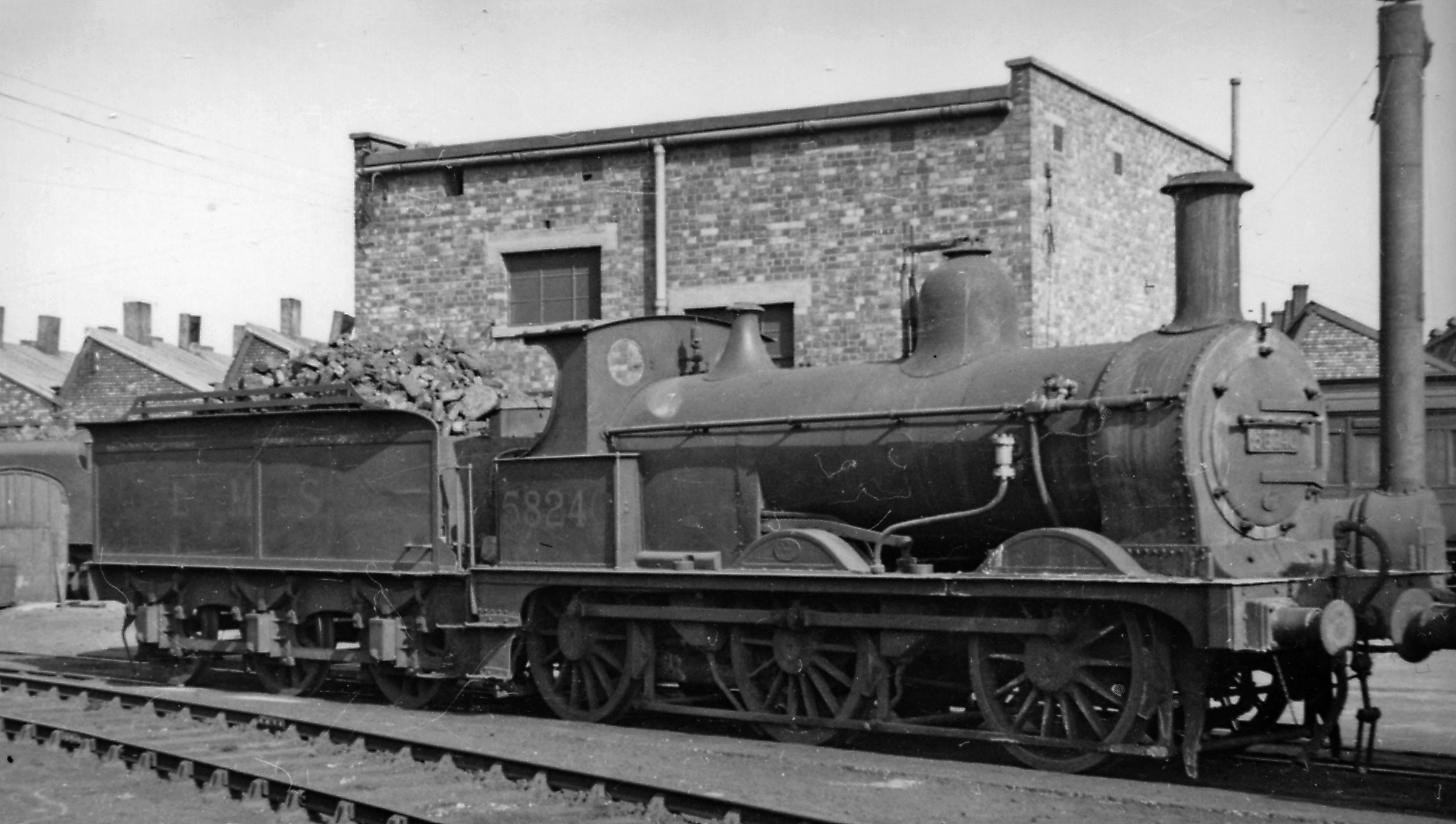
Ex-Midland 2F No. 58240 (formerly 3161) with original pre-Belpaire round-top boiler

The H and H1 boilers fitted to the "2736" and "3815" classes were larger, having a diameter of 4 ft 8 in (1,420 mm) rather than 4 ft 1 in (1,240 mm), and a longer firebox, which made the engines more powerful. While these were being built there started a program of rebuilding many of the earlier engines (but not the first 2 classes) with the "H" boiler to increase their power. By 1915, 380 engines had been so upgraded, giving 450 with "H" and 485 with "B".

Beginning in 1916 engines were rebuilt with Belpaire boilers. Those from the first two classes ("1142" & "1357"), (none of which had received an "H") received the smaller "G6" type boiler (similar size to the "B"), the remainder the larger "G7" size (similar size to the "H"). The "H" & "G7" boilered engines were classed "3" (later "3F") and those with "B" & "G6" boilers were classed "2" (later "2F").

By 1925, production of the new superheated 4F 0-6-0s meant there was no shortage of goods engines of this power class, and from that point only "G6" boilers were installed on rebuilding, sometimes on engines which had previously had "H" boilers, reducing them back to class 2. Three of the later examples were experimentally fitted with superheaters from 1923 to 1928, but generally the class remained saturated throughout. One hundred and thirteen engines remained with their original "B" boilers until scrapped, 22 had "H" boilers, 432 had "G7" and 368 had "G6".

== Dimensions ==
=== As built ===
Class	Pre-1907 numbers	Post-1907 numbers	Manufacturer	Date	Quantity built	Driving Wheels	Cylinders	Boiler	Notes
1142	1142–1251; 381–385, 400–404	2900–3019	Kitson & Co. (30); Dübs & Co. (30); Beyer, Peacock & Co. (30); Neilson & Co. (30)	1875–1876	120	4′ 10½″	17½″ × 26″	B – 140 psi	later had 18″ × 26″ cylinders; BR 58114–58187
1357	1357–1376; 1432–1471; 1582–1631	3020–3129	Dübs & Co. (20); R. Stephenson & Co. (30); Beyer, Peacock & Co. (50); Derby Works (10)	1878–1884	110	5′ 2½″	17½″ × 26″	B – 140 psi	later had 18″ × 26″ cylinders; BR 58188–58228
1698	1698–1717; 1758–1797	3130–3189	Derby Works	1885–1888	60	4′ 10½″	18″ × 26″	B – 140 psi	
1798	1798–1807	3190–3199	Derby Works	1888	10	5′ 2½″	18″ × 26″	B – 140 psi	
Neilson Goods	1873–1972	3200–3299	Neilson & Co.	1890–1891	100	5′ 2½″	18″ × 26″	B – 150 psi	Collectively, the "1873" class.
J	2023–2092	3300–3369	Kitson & Co. (40); Dübs & Co. (30)	1890–1892	70	5′ 2½″	18″ × 26″	B – 150 psi	Collectively, the "1873" class.
J2	2133–2182	3410–3459	Dübs & Co.	1892–1894	50	5′ 2½″	18″ × 26″	B – 150 psi	Collectively, the "1873" class.
M	2093–2132; 361–370; 2259–2358; 2391–2420; 2461–2500; 2541–2570; 2641–2735	3370–3409; 3460–3764	Sharp, Stewart & Co. (85); Derby Works (10); Neilson & Co. (75); Kitson & Co. (50); Neilson, Reid & Co. (85); Dübs & Co. (20); Vulcan Foundry (20)	1892–1902	345	5′ 2½″	18″ × 26″	B – 160 psi	Collectively, the "1873" class.
2736	2736–2740; 240–244	3765–3774	Derby Works	1903	10	5′ 2½″	18″ × 26″	H – 175 psi	
2736	245–284	3775–3814	Derby Works	1903–1906	40	5′ 2½″	18½″ × 26″	H – 175 psi	
3815	—	3815–3834	Derby Works	1908	20	5′ 2½″	18½″ × 26″	H1 – 175 psi	

The smaller driving wheels gave an enhanced tractive effort at the expense of reduced speed, which was useful on coal (and other mineral) trains.

=== Later dimensions ===
Numbers	Class	Weight	Boiler pressure	Driving wheels	Cylinders	Tractive effort
2900–3019	2F	40 tons	160 psi	4′ 10½″	18″ × 26″	19,420 lbf
3020–3129	2F	40 tons	160 psi	5′ 2½″	18″ × 26″	18,185 lbf
3130–3189	2F	40 tons	160 psi	4′ 10½″	18″ × 26″	19,420 lbf
3130–3189	3F	43 tons 17 cwt	175 psi	4′ 10½″	18″ × 26″	21,240 lbf
3190–3774	2F	40 tons	160 psi	5′ 2½″	18″ × 26″	18,185 lbf
3190–3774	3F	43 tons 17 cwt	175 psi	5′ 2½″	18″ × 26″	19,890 lbf
3775–3834	3F	46 tons 3 cwt	175 psi	5′ 2½″	18½″ × 26″	21,010 lbf

== Use on joint lines ==
Sixteen engines of the "M" class were bought by the Midland and Great Northern Joint Railway, eight in 1896 and eight in 1899, which were numbered 58–73. All were built with Class "B" boilers (4 ft 3 in (1,300 mm) diameter over the largest ring, round-top firebox), and replacement boilers were normally of the same type; but two (nos. 62 and 69) were rebuilt in 1906 and 1909 with the larger Class "H" boiler (4 ft 9 1/8 in (1,451 mm) diameter over the largest ring, round-top). In 1921, two others (nos. 68 and 71) were rebuilt with the Belpaire Class "G7" boiler (4 ft 9 1/8 in (1,451 mm) diameter, Belpaire firebox) together with longer smokeboxes, which required the main frames to be extended at both front and rear. The two already fitted with Class "H" boilers received "G7" boilers and frame extensions in 1923 and 1928.

All 16 were acquired by the London and North Eastern Railway (LNER) on 1 October 1936 and new numbers 058–073 were allocated, but five (nos. 63, 66, 67, 68, 72) were considered to be worn out and withdrawn in 1936–37, and three of these (nos. 66, 67, 72) did not receive their LNER numbers. The remaining eleven were added to LNER book stock in 1937 and classified J40 if fitted with the Class "B" boiler, or J41 if fitted with the Class "G7" boiler. Withdrawal of these 11 began in 1938, and by the time that the LNER renumbering scheme was prepared in June 1943, there were five left, nos. 059, 064, 065, 070 and 071. These were allotted numbers 4100–4, but none lasted long enough to be renumbered: the last, no. 059, was withdrawn in June 1944.

Ten engines of "M" class were bought by the Somerset and Dorset Joint Railway in 1896 and 1902, numbered 62–66 and 72–76. All ended up with "G7" boilers and were taken into LMS stock as class 3F in 1930. The 10 locos were assigned odd numbers between 3194 and 3260 in other batches of the locos, which had become vacant due to withdrawals.

== Numbering ==
=== LMS ===
The class all retained their numbers when they passed to the London, Midland and Scottish Railway (LMS) at the 1923 grouping, but in 1934 2900–2984 (all class 2F) had 20000 added to their numbers to make way for newer locomotives. The same happened to 3000–3019 in 1947.

=== British Railways ===
At nationalisation those that were class 3F, along with other LMS locomotives, had 40000 added to their numbers by British Railways, but the class 2Fs were reorganised into a new series 58114–58310.

== Accidents and incidents ==
- On 1 December 1900, locomotive No. 1433 was hauling a freight train when it was derailed at Peckwash, Derbyshire, possibly after the driver lost control and the train ran away.
- On 14 August 1949, locomotive No. 3260 was hauling a passenger train when it collided with a peat train at Ashcott, Somerset and was derailed. The locomotive was subsequently scrapped.

== Withdrawal ==
Withdrawal of the engines from service began in 1925, starting with unrebuilt engines, and continued until 1964. The final three to be withdrawn were locomotives 43620, 43637 and 43669, based at Derby. Despite the class's large size and long service life, none were preserved.

== SM&JR farewell tour ==
No. 43222 hauled the Stephenson Locomotive Society's SM&JR railtour on 29 April 1956. It carried the reporting number M500.

== Model railways ==
Tri-ang Railways began producing a basic OO gauge model of the 2736 class, specifically No. 3775, in 1958. Bachmann Industries released several models of the M Class in LMS and BR liveries starting in 2010. Both companies referred to their models as 3F instead of the proper class titles.

In 2012, OO gauge models of the 1698 Class 2F 0-6-0 were produced by OO Works. These were of No. 3175 in LMS black or MR livery, LMS No. 22964/2964 and BR No. 58246.

== Gallery ==
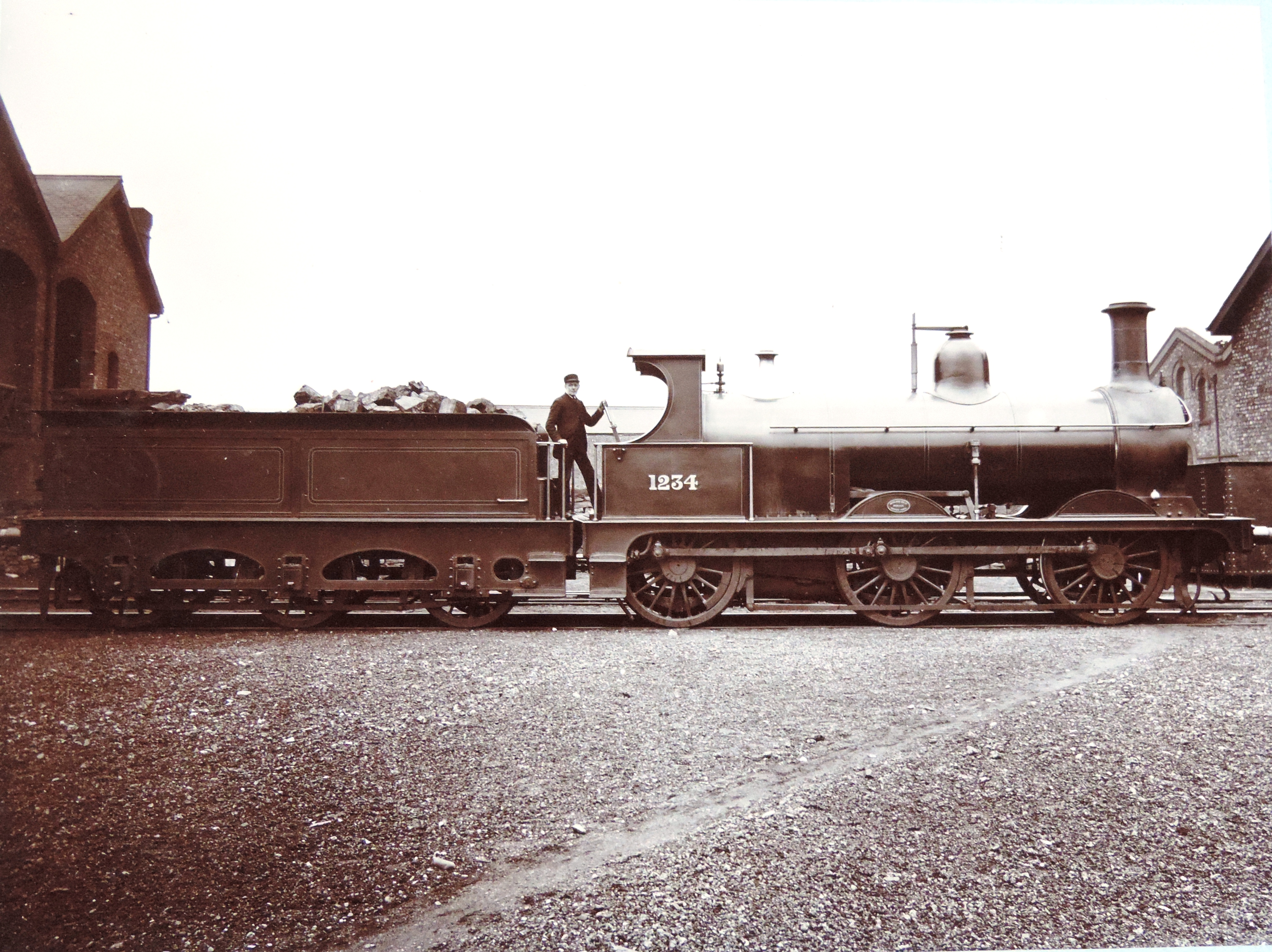
1142 Class No 1234.
Built by Neilson and Company in 1876; renumbered 3002 in 1907; rebuilt with a Belpaire boiler in 1918; renumbered 23002 in 1947; renumbered 58175 by British Railways; withdrawn December 1960.

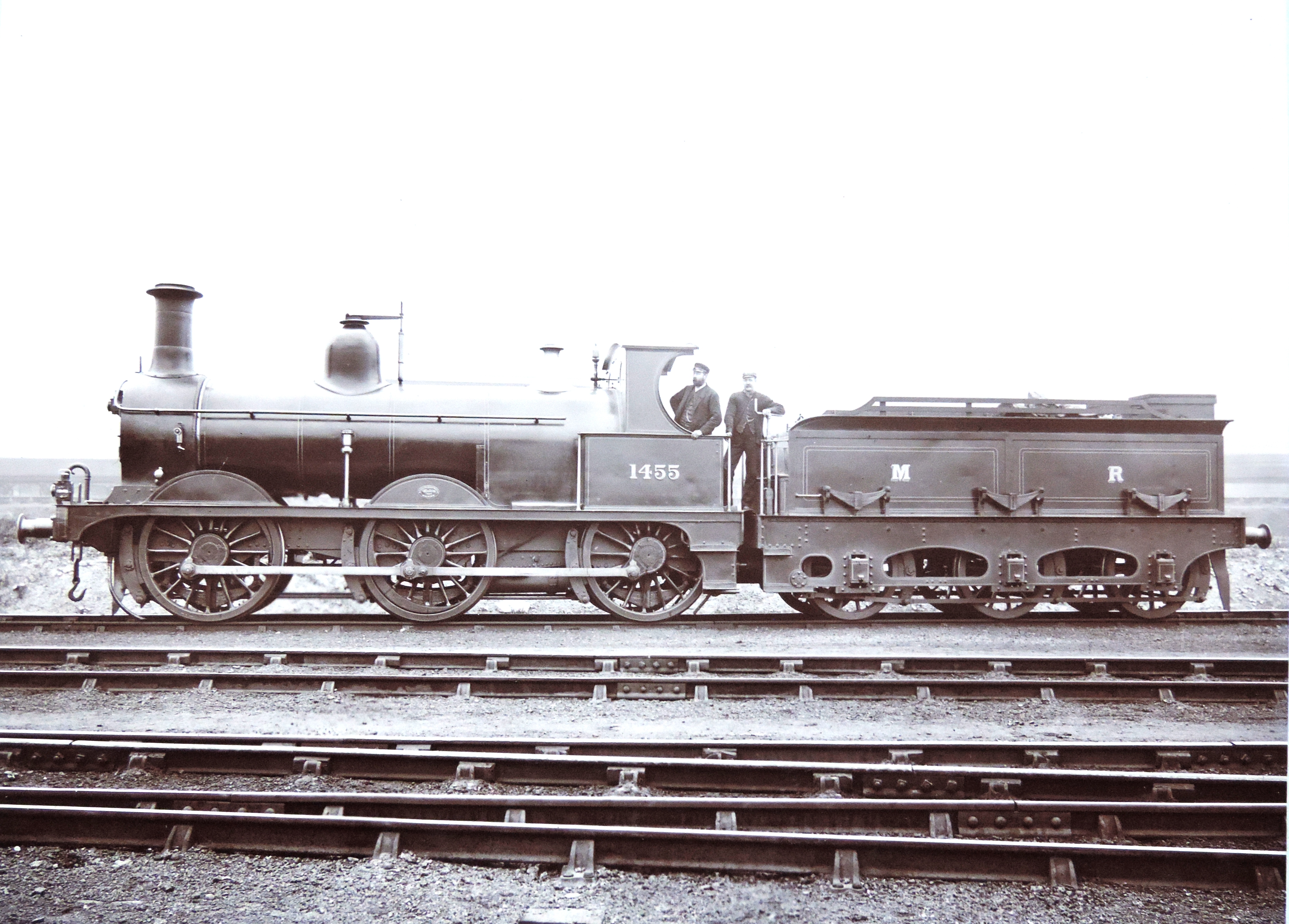
1357 Class No 1455.
Built at the railway's Derby Works in 1880; rebuilt in 1898; renumbered 3043 in 1907; rebuilt in 1909; became London Midland and Scottish Railway 3043 in 1923; rebuilt with G6-type Belpaire boiler in 1926; withdrawn June 1934.

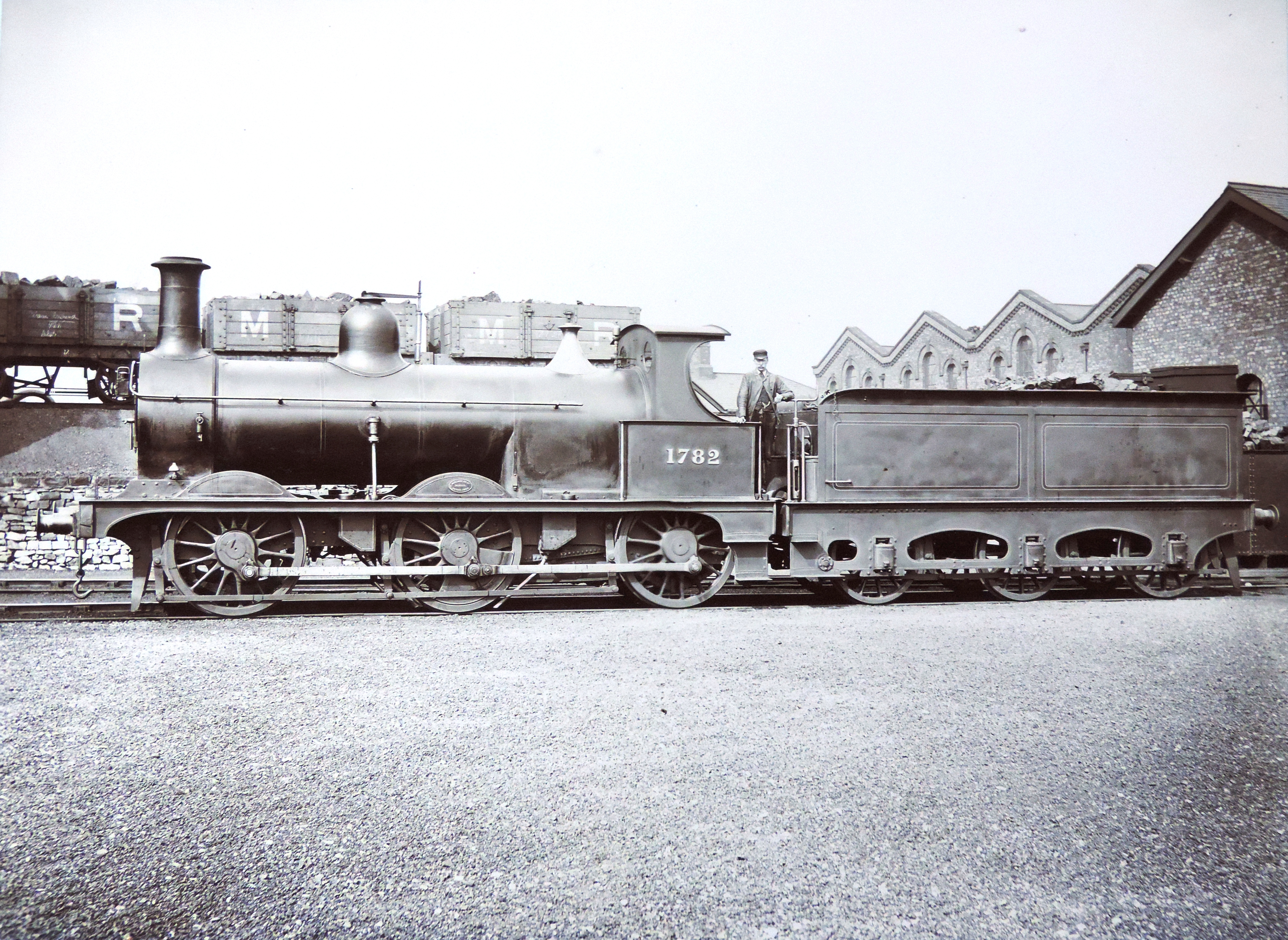
1698 Class No 1782.
Built at the railway's Derby Works in 1887; rebuilt with an H-type boiler in 1904; renumbered 3174 in 1907; rebuilt with a G7-type Belpaire boiler in 1923; became London, Midland and Scottish Railway 3174 in 1923; became British Railways 43174 in 1948; withdrawn February 1960.

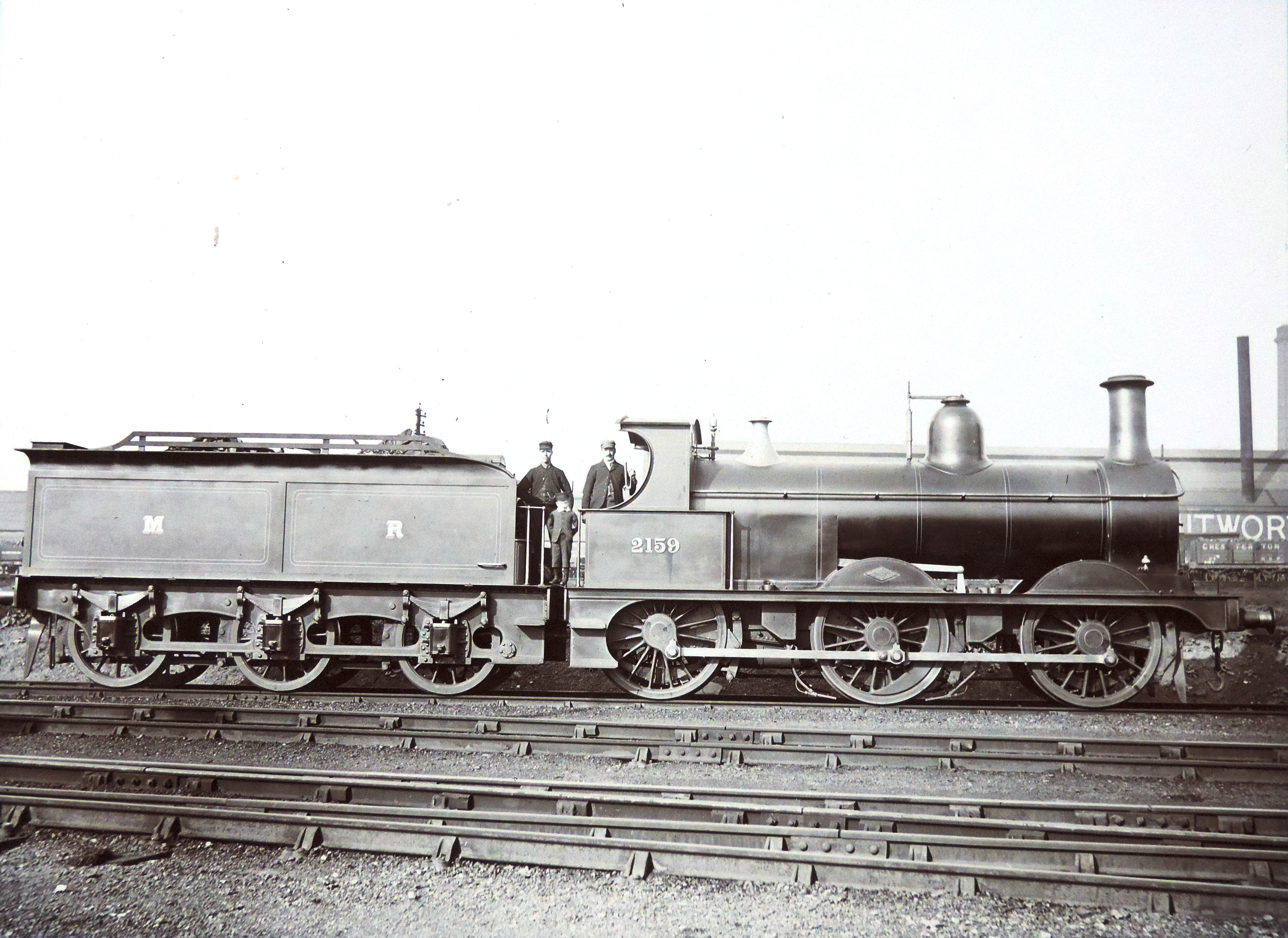
1873 Class/J2 No 2159.
Built by Dübs ad Companyin 1893; rebuilt with H-type boiler in 1906; renumbered 3436 in 1907; became London Midland and Scottish Railway 3436 in 1923; rebuilt with G7-type Belpaire boiler in 1924; became British Railways 43436 in 1948; withdrawn June 1962.

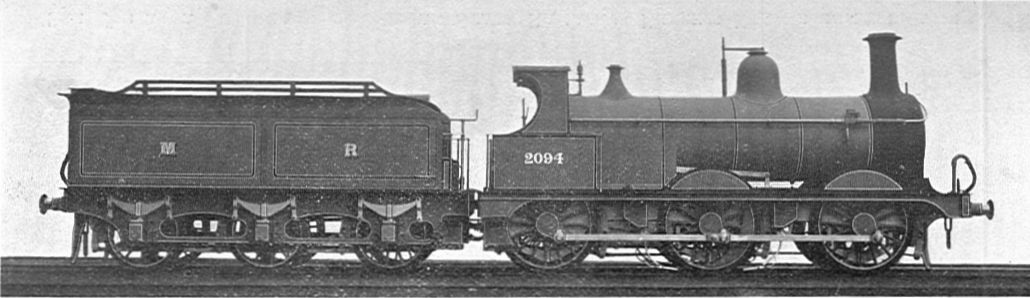
1873 Class/M No 2094,
presumably built around 1892/93.

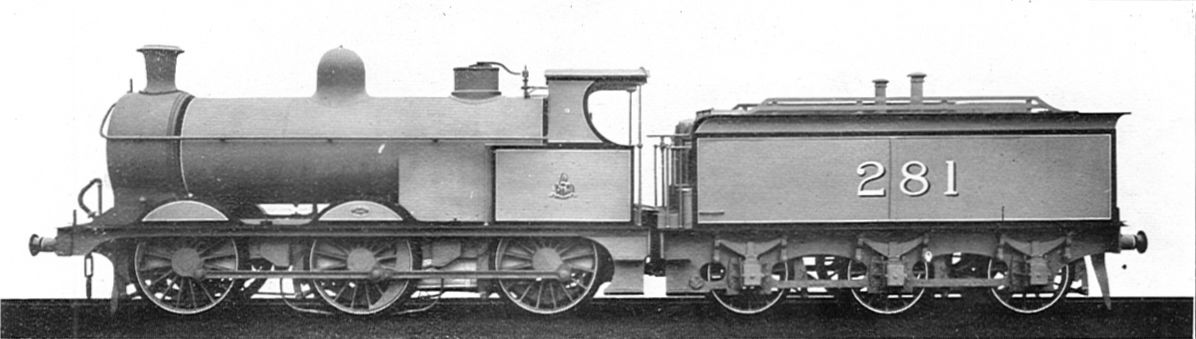
2736 Class No 281
in photographic grey, presumably built around 1905/06.
- See also Media related to Midland Railway Johnson 0-6-0 locomotives at Wikimedia Commons
