= Iron horse =

Term for steam locomotives and railways

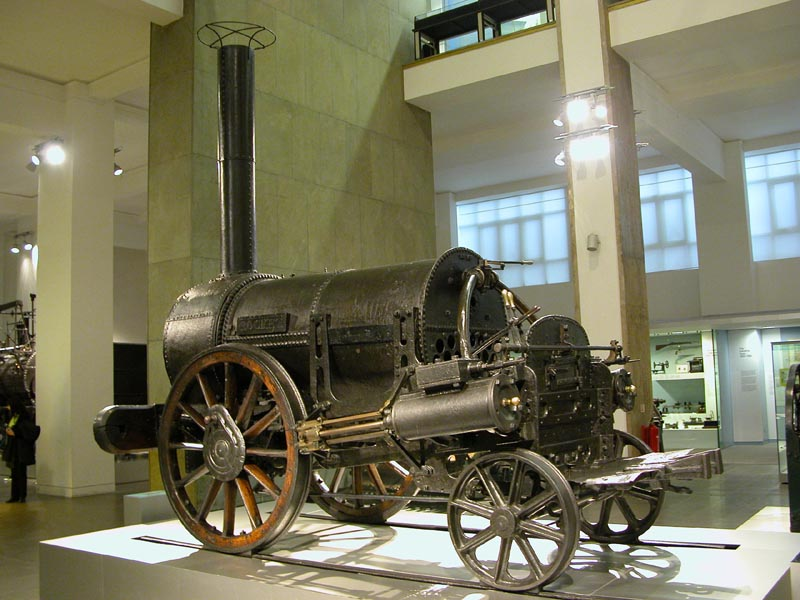
Rocket as preserved in the Science Museum, London

Iron horse is a pervasive term (considered by the early twenty-first century to be transitioning into an archaic reference) for a steam locomotive and the railway on which it travels, originating in the early 1800s, when horses still powered most machinery.

The term was common and popular in both British and North American literary articles.

== Use of the term ==
Iron horse was used admiringly when comparing early road and railway traction engine performance to slower, less powerful horse-powered tramways. The usage of the word 'Iron' reflecting the material required for functioning railways is found as early as 1825.

The iron horse term became widely popularized and found frequent use in the century-and-a-half following the competition won by Stephenson's Rocket, in innumerable newspaper articles as well as in various novels.

In understanding the role of railways in political terms, the idea of the railway and locomotives as extending countries power over others is found in historical studies, and colonialism studies. In academic and popular renditions of railway history, the term was used frequently.

The term's historical context, and its use in films and other media, is extensive. The understanding of the development of railways was not confined to America or Australia, the term was across cultural boundaries such as the Huenemann book about railways in China 'The Dragon and the Iron Horse'.

In Australia the film Iron Horse was well noted as an indicator of the usage of the term to do with expansion of railways across the continent. In the United States the 'Iron Horse' was a component of national, state histories, of the Civil War, even as a component of constitutional history.

It began to decline in use, at least in North American colloquial expression, with the decline in rail transport as the primary mode of transport.

The more recent usages of the term show a continuity in titles of films and places - such as the Iron Horse (TV series), and in California, the Iron Horse Regional Trail.
