= Robert Taylor (architect) =

English architect and sculptor (1714–1788)

Sir Robert Taylor JP
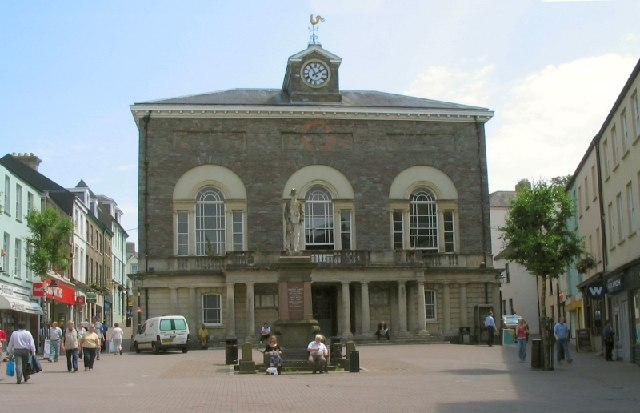
- Carmarthen Guildhall by Sir Robert Taylor 1767–77
- Born: 1714; Woodford, Essex, England
- Died: 27 September 1788 (aged 73–74); London, England
- Occupation: Architect
- Buildings: Bank of England; Heveningham Hall; Gorhambury House

Sir Robert Taylor JP (1714 – 27 September 1788) was an English architect and sculptor who worked in London and the south of England.

== Early life ==
Born at Woodford, Essex, Taylor followed in his father's footsteps and started working as a stonemason and sculptor, spending time as a pupil of Sir Henry Cheere. Despite some important commissions, including a bust of London merchant Christopher Emmott (died 1745) today held in the church of St Bartholomew, Colne, Lancashire, and another of William Phipps (died 1748), now in the parish church of Westbury, Wiltshire, he enjoyed little success and turned instead to architecture.

== Career ==
Among Taylor's earliest projects was Asgill House (known then as Richmond Place), built for a wealthy banker, Sir Charles Asgill, in Richmond upon Thames (c. 1760), and nearby Oak House. Through such connections, he came to be appointed as architect to the Bank of England until his death, when he was succeeded by Sir John Soane. In 1769 he succeeded Sir William Chambers as Architect of the King's Works. His pupils included John Nash, Samuel Pepys Cockerell, George Byfield and William Pilkington.

He served as a magistrate, and in 1783 served as a Sheriff of London and was knighted the same year.

Sir Robert served as a vice president on the board of the Foundling Hospital, a prominent charity dedicated to the welfare of London's abandoned children.

== Personal life ==
Taylor and his wife Elizabeth (d. 1803) had a son, Michael Angelo Taylor (1757–1834), who, as MP for Poole, became a Whig politician during the 1830s. His death was caused by catching a chill at his friend Asgill's funeral in September 1788. Father and son were buried in the church of St Martin-in-the-Fields in Trafalgar Square, London. Taylor is commemorated, with a marble plaque dedicated to him, on the wall of the south transept of Westminster Abbey.

== Legacy ==
The Taylor Institution, Oxford University's centre for the study of medieval and modern European languages and literature, takes its name from a bequest from Taylor for the purpose of "establishing a foundation for the teaching and improving the European languages". The money was initially invested and interest left to accrue to cover building costs.

The Sir Robert Taylor Society is an organisation which seeks to bring together modern language teachers in schools and university lecturers from the Faculty of Medieval and Modern Languages, University of Oxford. A meeting is held once a year, shortly before the start of the Michaelmas term, at which talks are given on the literature and culture of the language communities represented in the Oxford faculty, and university admissions trends in the various languages are discussed.

== Architectural works ==
From Binney's book:

- 14 St James's Square, London, alterations (1748–50)
- 112 Bishopsgate, City of London (c. 1750); demolished
- Braxted Lodge, Essex, extension (1752–56)
- Bishop's Palace, Chester, remodelled (1754–57); demolished 1874
- 35 & 36 Lincoln's Inn Fields, London (1754–57); 36 rebuilt 1859, 35 bombed in the Blitz 1941
- Mausoleum, Chilham Church (1754); demolished 1862
- Harleyford Manor, near Marlow, Buckinghamshire (1755)
- Coptford Hall, near Margaretting, Essex (1755); demolished 1850
- Comarques, Thorpe-le-Soken, Essex, later the home of the novelist Arnold Bennett
- London Bridge, removal of houses on the bridge and replacement of the central two arches by a single arch (1756–66); demolished 1831
- Barlaston Hall, Staffordshire (1756–57)
- The Grove, Watford, Hertfordshire remodelling (1780)
- 70 Lombard Street, London (c. 1756); demolished c. 1920
- Pond House, Village Way, Dulwich (1759) for John Tinkler as a hunting lodge; exceptional original features include gold cornicing in the drawing room and exquisite mouldings in the dining room depicting Roman and Greek themes
- Grafton House, Piccadilly (c. 1760); demolished 1966
- Longford Castle, alterations (c. 1760)
- Ottershaw Park, near Chertsey, Surrey (1761); demolished 1908
- Asgill House, Richmond, Surrey (1761–64)
- Danson House, Bexley, Kent (1762–67)
- Trewithan House, Cornwall, dining room and other additions (1763–64)
- Bank Buildings, Threadneedle Street, City of London (1764–66); demolished 1844
- Bank of England, Rotunda & Transfers office (1765–68), Court Room & associated offices (1765–72), Reduced Annuity Office (1787); demolished apart from the Court Room which was incorporated into the current building
- Arnos Grove house in Cannon Hill, Southgate, north London, library and dining room (c. 1765)
- 34 Spring Gardens, Charing Cross, London, Taylor's own house (1767); demolished 1885
- Kevington Hall, enlarged, Kevington, Kent (1767–69)
- Six minor bridges on the Botley Road, Oxford (1767); none survives
- Swinford Bridge, over the River Thames at Eynsham (1767–69)
- 33 Upper Brook Street, Mayfair, London (1769)
- 1 to 14 Grafton Street, London (1769 onwards); only 3 to 6 and the basement of 7 survive
- Chute Lodge, Wiltshire, near Andover (c. 1768)
- Purbrook Park, Portsdown Hill, Hampshire (c. 1770) – the first recreation of a Roman atrium in England; demolished 1829
- Sharpham House, near Totnes, Devon (c. 1770)
- The Oaks, the ballroom, attributed, Carshalton, Surrey (c. 1770)
- The Bishop's Palace, Ely, alterations (1771); little of the work survives
- Althorp, Northamptonshire, repairs to the roof (1772)
- Thorncroft, Leatherhead, Surrey (1772)
- Spencer House, London, decoration of staircase ceiling (1772)
- Mount Clare, Roehampton (1772)
- Maidenhead Bridge, Berkshire (1772–77)
- Ely House, Dover Street, Mayfair, London (1772–1776); interior remodelled 1909
- Porter's Lodge, Shenley, Hertfordshire (1772); altered 1903
- Stone Buildings, Lincoln's Inn, London (1774–80)
- Six Clerk's and Enrolment Offices, Chancery Lane, London for Lincoln's Inn (1775–77)
- Assembly Rooms, Belfast, Northern Ireland (1776); exterior altered 1845, interior altered 1895
- Spire of St Peter's Church, Wallingford (1776–77)
- Heveningham Hall (1777 – c. 1780); interiors by James Wyatt (c. 1780 – 1784)
- Gorhambury Manor, St Albans (1777–90); altered 1816–17, 1826–28 and 1847
- Church Long Ditton, Surrey (1778); demolished 1880
- Bishop's Palace, Salisbury, alterations including gothic porch, doors, windows and chimneypiece (1982)
- Admiralty House, London (1786–88); interiors by Samuel Pepys Cockerell
- Salisbury Guildhall (1788–95), executed after Taylor's death by his pupil William Pilkington
- House in Whitehall Yard, London for his son (1788), built 1793
- 15 Philpot Lane, London, date unknown
- Clumber Park, Nottinghamshire, a room with columned screens at either end, date unknown, demolished 1938

Further works, not listed in Binney's book as by Taylor:

- alterations to Bayley Park, Heathfield, East Sussex (1766)
- Beckenham Place Park, Kent (1773)
- Clermont Hall, Lodge, Norfolk (1769–1775)
- alterations to 10 Downing Street, London SW1 (c. 1780)

== Gallery of architectural work ==
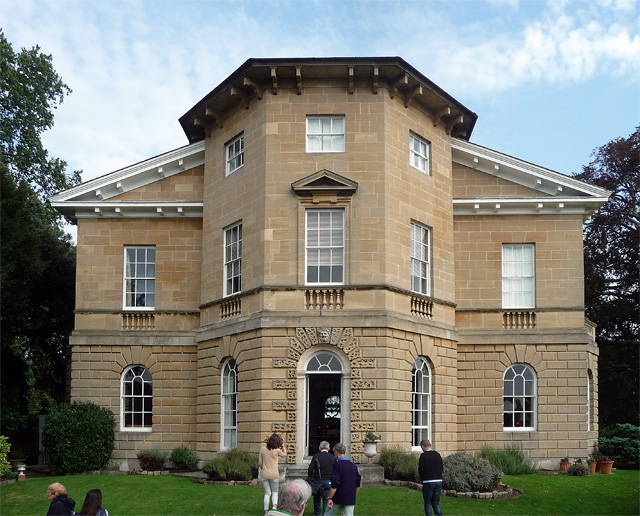
Asgill House, Richmond

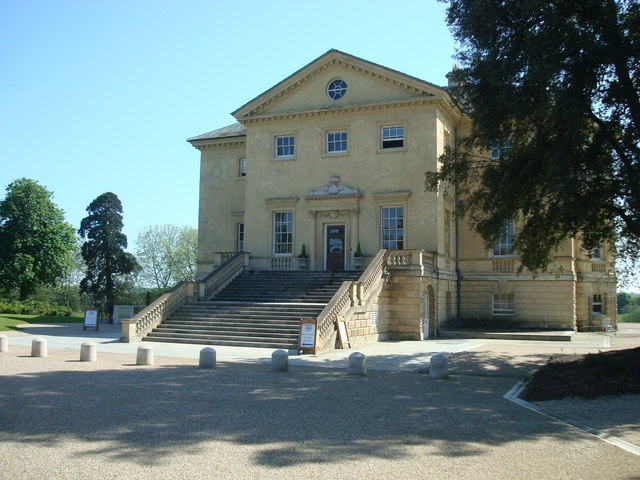
Danson House, Kent

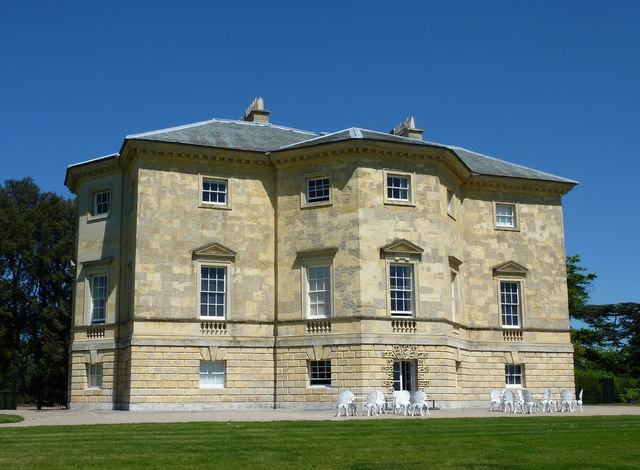
Danson House, Kent

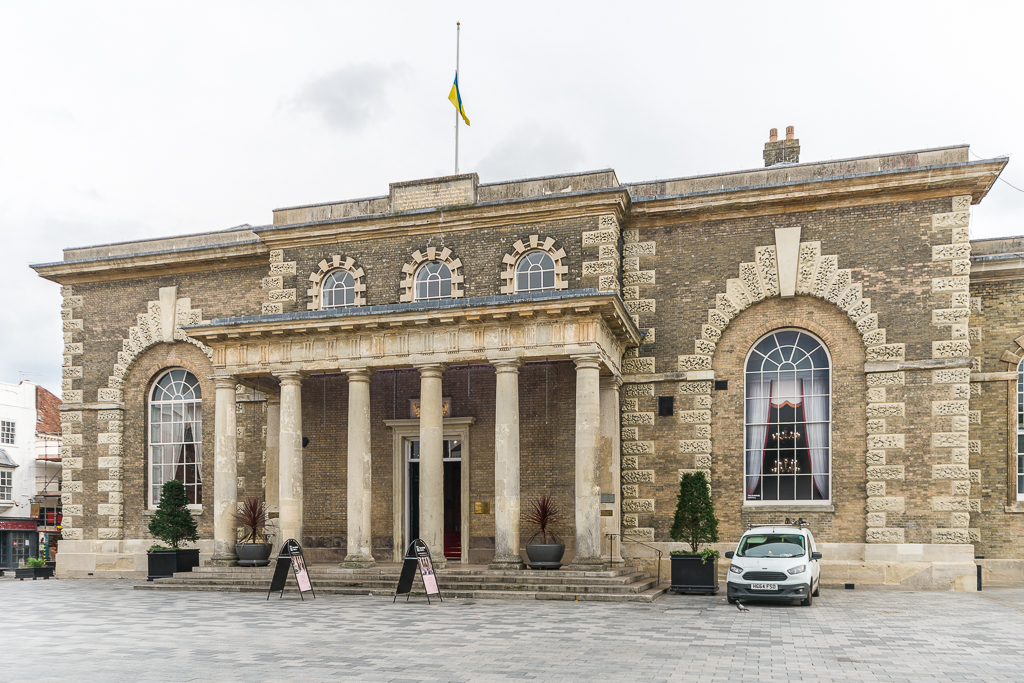
Salisbury Guildhall

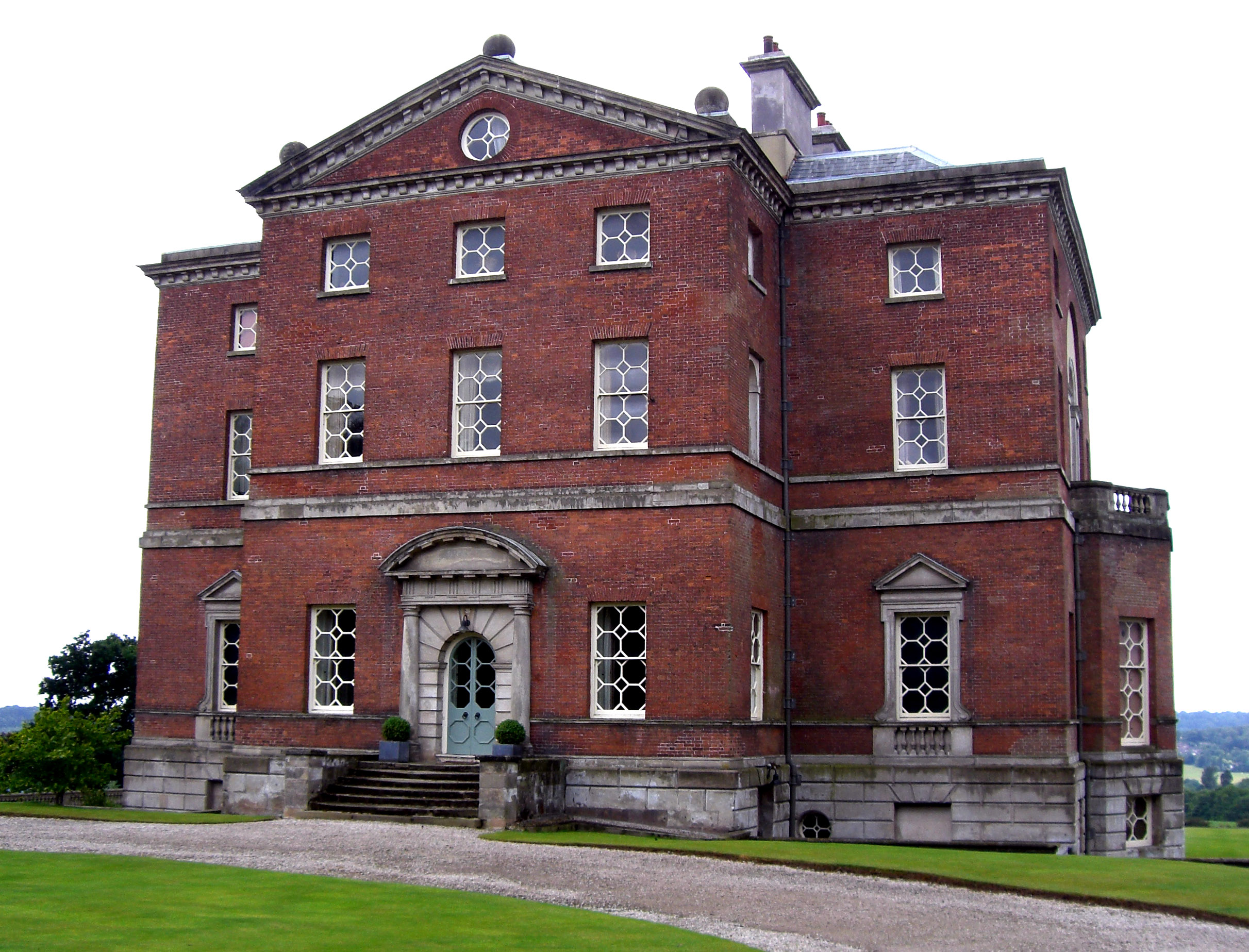
Barlaston Hall, Staffordshire

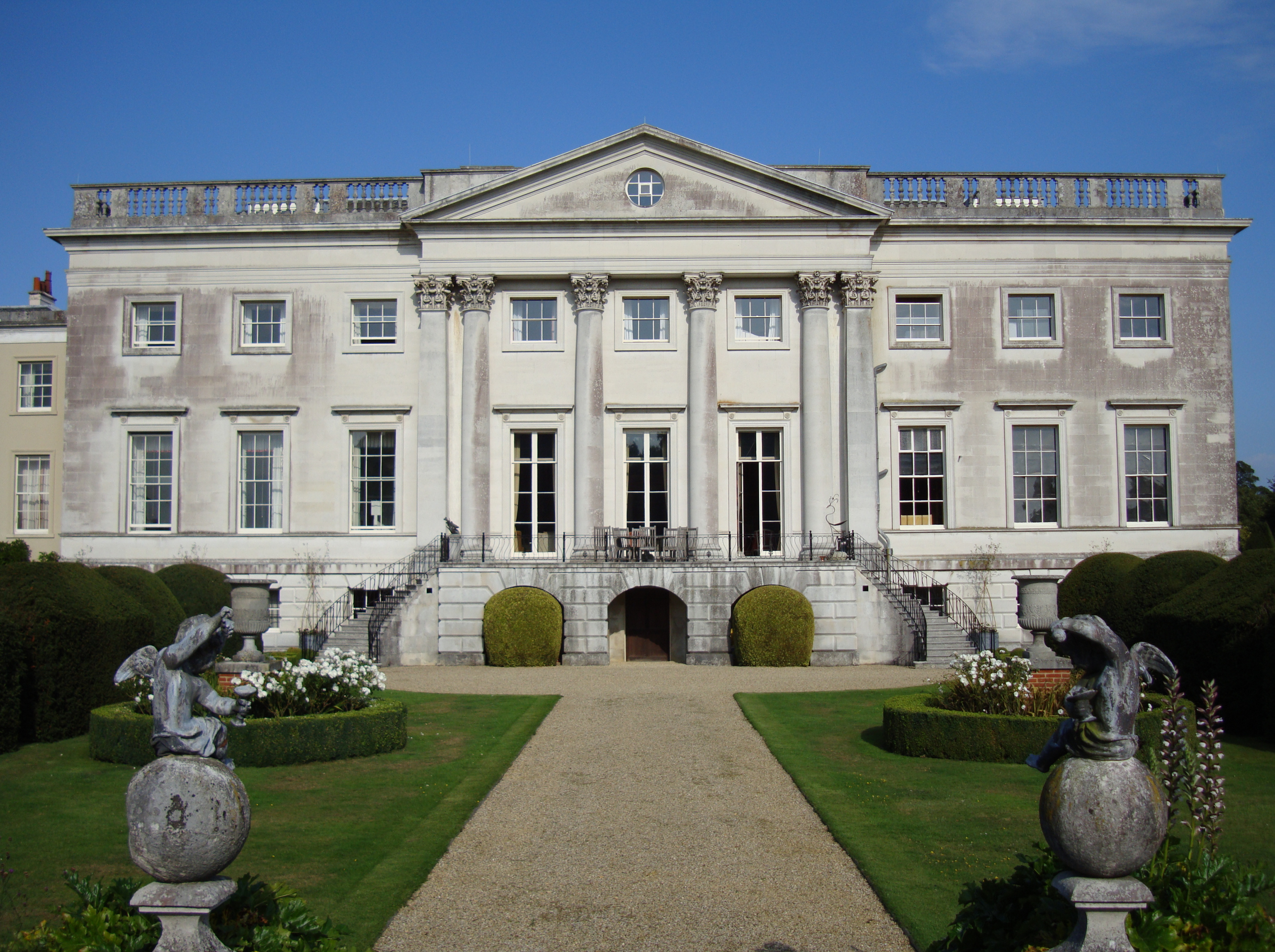
Gorhambury House

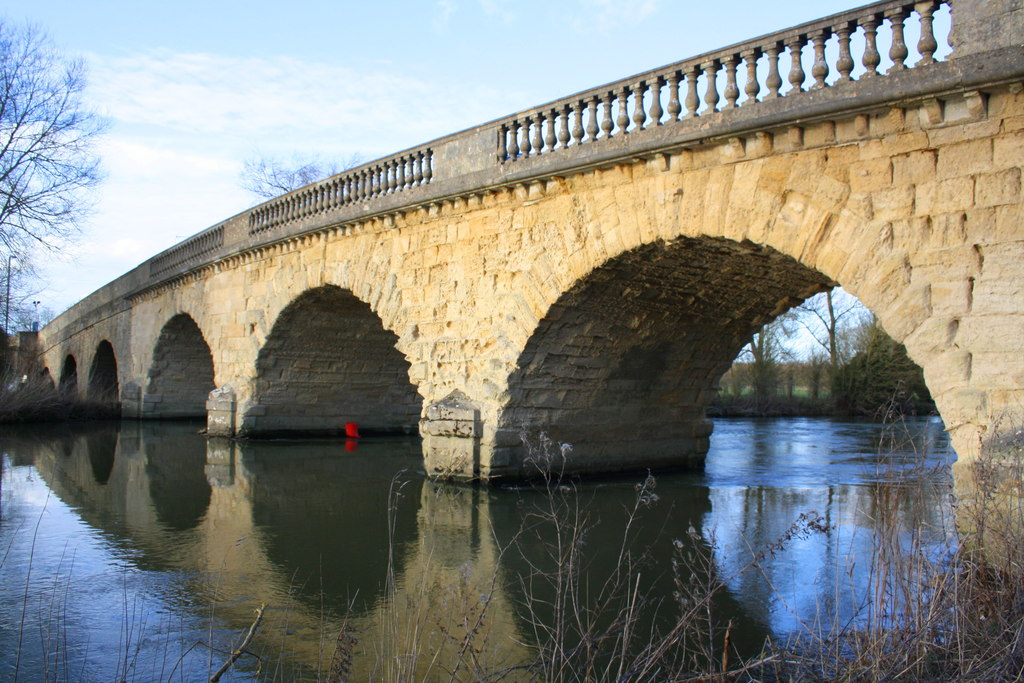
Swinford Bridge

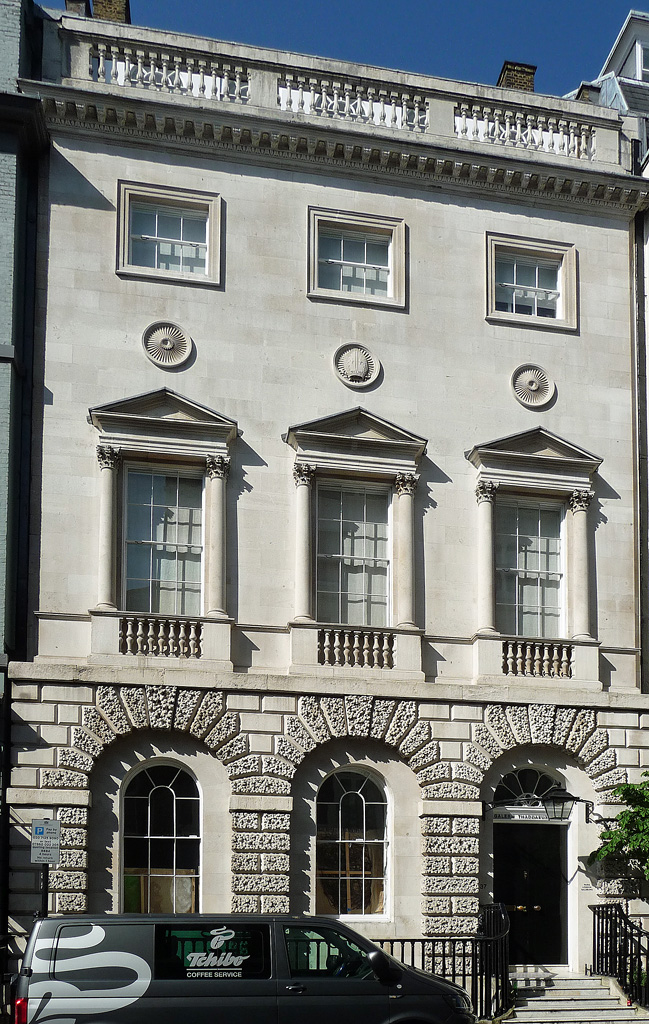
Ely House, Dover Street, Westminster

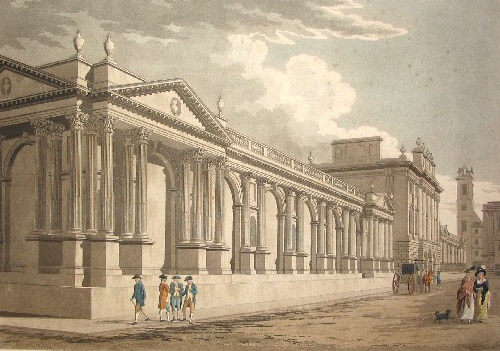
Bank of England, showing one of Taylor's wings, demolished

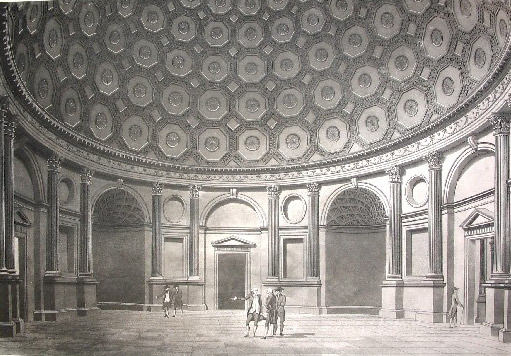
Reduced Annuity Office, Bank of England, demolished

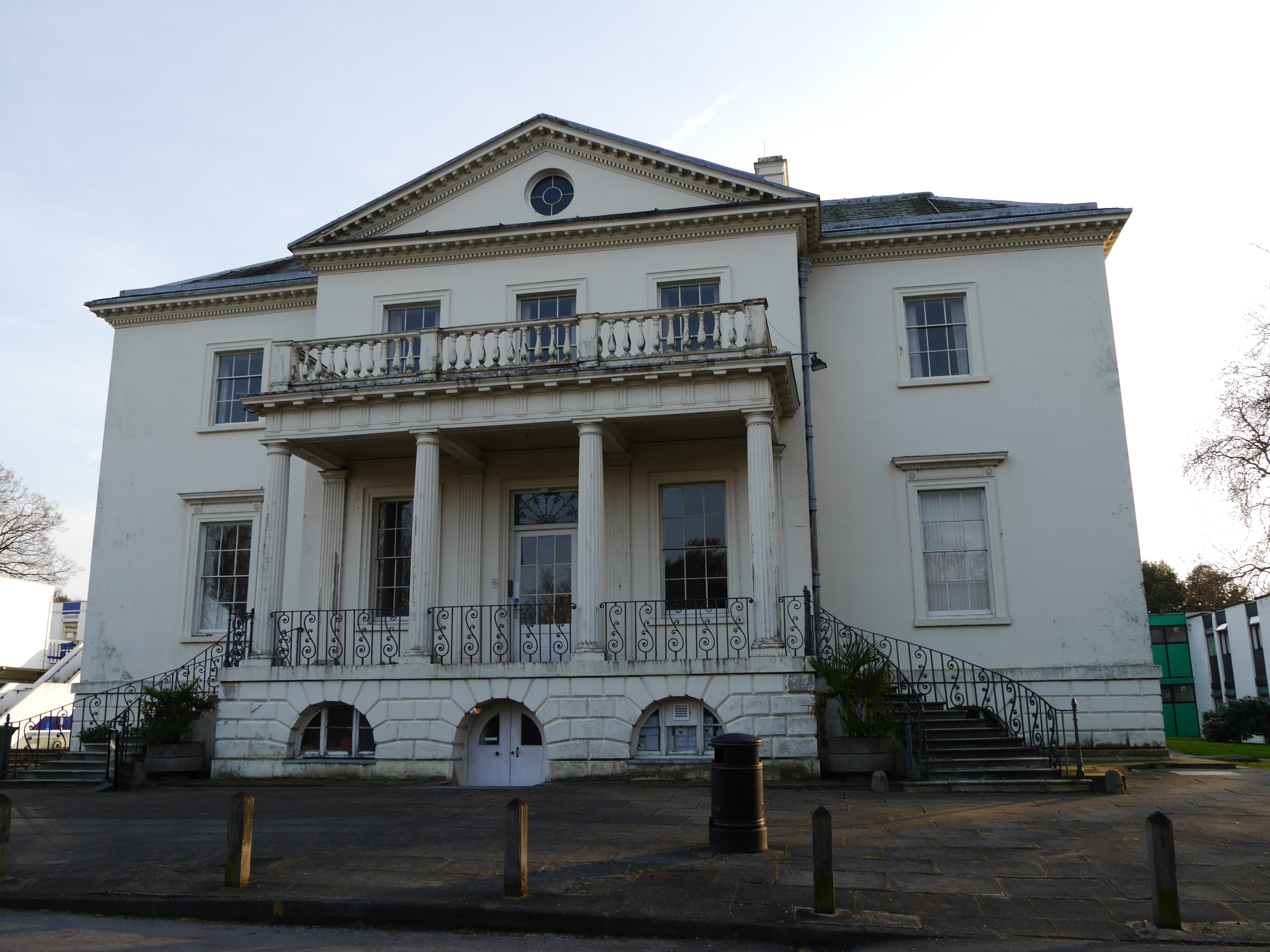
Mount Clare, Roehampton, London

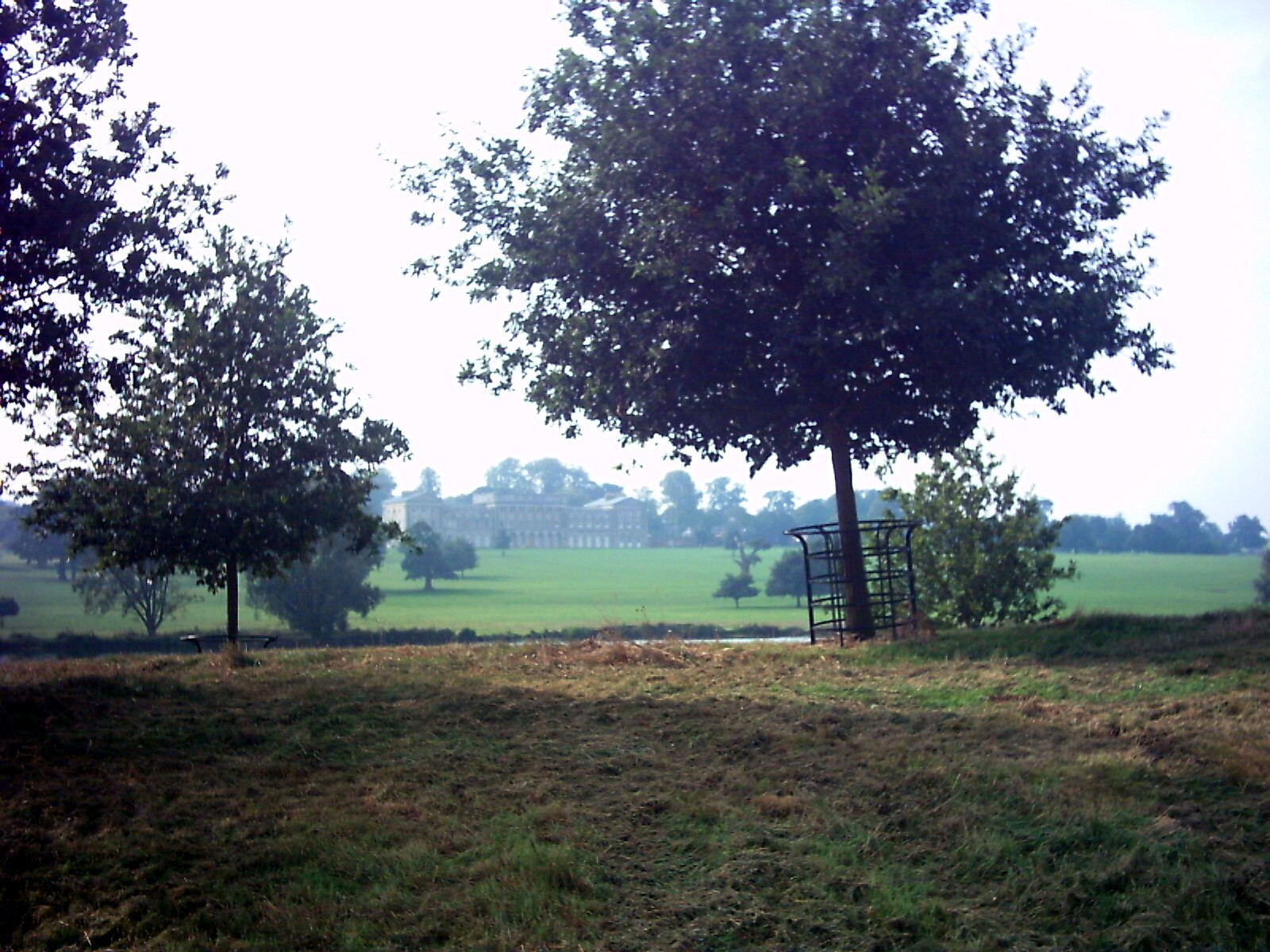
Heveningham Hall
