= Hammer Prints Limited =

Wallpaper and ceramics manufacturer

- Founded: 5 August 1954
- Founder: Nigel Henderson, Eduardo Paolozzi
- Defunct: 1975

Hammer Prints Limited was a company founded in 1954 by Nigel Henderson and Eduardo Paolozzi.

== History ==
Founded on 5 August 1954, Hammer Prints Ltd was established: "To purchase, sell, manufacture, hire or act as agents for the sale of textiles, wallpaper, statuary, ceramics, furniture and photographic equipment and materials". Henderson and Paolozzi were registered as the company directors along with Judith Henderson who acted as secretary. Working from a studio at Henderson's home at Landermere Wharf near Thorpe-le-Soken in Essex, they developed over eleven designs that were screen printed onto wallpapers, textiles and readymade ceramic products.

Hammer Prints coincided with the artists’ involvement in the Independent Group, a contingent of artists, architects and writers who celebrated popular culture and mass production. Paolozzi's notes stated "it is the object of Hammer Prints Ltd that an attack be made on the craft field using the silk-screen as the media to be exploited."

Hammer Prints wallpapers were manufactured by Cole & Son from 1955, and their textile designs were produced by the Lancashire firm Hull Traders from 1958. Coalface, Cowcumber, Hessian and Sgraffito were the first to become available from January 1955. Barkcloth, Big Drawings, Newsprint, Portobello and Townscape followed whilst Sea Beasts and Toys were developed for a range of ceramic tiles, lampstands, bowls, trays and furniture.

A letter from Paolozzi to Peter Hatch at the Council of Industrial Design, (latterly known as the Design Council) introduced their work:

"[The wallpapers] are printed in black on white and white on black. The same screens have been employed in different colours according to customers requirements, we also provide the same designs printed on various fabrics by the Helzarin colour process... The origin of the designs of the wallpapers is the outcome of the application of design ideas employed by Nigel Henderson, Head of Creative Photography at the Central School of Arts and Crafts and Eduardo Paolozzi design instructor at the same school."

Sgraffito is built up round several photo prints of an inked impression of an engraved block of plaster.
Hessian is a demonstration of a monotype principal, pieces of inked canvas arranged and rearranged to form a multi-evocative pattern.
Coalface, lid of a tea chest engraved and worked upon with red-hot wires to form a design which would evoke the world of geological stratifications and form a background to modern living.
Cowcumber, photo-enlargement of a seventeenth century herbal wood-cut with adjustments made to fit scale of screen and repeat."

Some promotional material on their designs described two later patterns:

Newsprint which was originally called 'Paris Walls', has its origin in a large number of photographs of hoardings, wall drawings, and so forth taken during a visit to that city.
Barkcloth has an affinity with the semi-abstract designs of some primitive peoples, in which man's own products are rendered into their simplest forms and incorporated as elements in a geometrical design.

Hammer Prints exhibitions were held at the Studio Club on Swallow Street in December 1955 and from 10 December 1956 to 4 January 1957. The Castle Bookshop on Museum Street in Colchester also held 'an exhibition and sale of bowls, tiles, scarves, textiles and wallpapers from 21 April to 5 May 1956.

The collaboration between the artists lasted only a few years with Henderson working on designs alone until 1962. The artists continued to receive royalties on their design work from Cole & Son and Hull Traders until the company was dissolved in 1975.

== Hammer Prints clients ==
- Jane Drew
- Bristol Old Vic
- Liberty (department store)
- John Dankworth
- Institute of Contemporary Arts
- Terence Conran
- Richard Sheppard (architect)
- Theo Crosby
