= Beaumont-cum-Moze =

- Civil parish
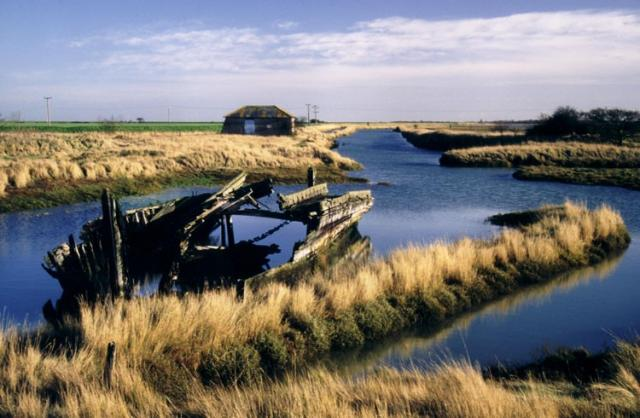
- Interactive map of Beaumont-cum-Moze
- Coordinates: 51.881°N 1.159°E
- Country: United Kingdom
- Primary council: Tendring
- County: Essex
- Region: East of England
- Status: Parish

Population (Parish, 2021)
  - Total: 341
- Postal code: CO16
- Website: Beaumont-cum-Moze Parish Council

Beaumont-cum-Moze (grid reference TM175250) is a civil parish in the Tendring district of Essex, England. The parish includes the hamlets of Beaumont and Moze Cross. At the 2021 census the parish had a population of 341.

The place-name 'Beaumont' was originally Fulanpettæ in a Saxon charter of circa 995, and Fulepet in the Domesday Book of 1086, meaning 'foul pit'. By 1175-80 it had become Bealmont, meaning 'beautiful hill', a very early example of successful rebranding.

The place-name 'Moze' is first attested in the Domesday Book, where it appears as Mosa. This is from the Old English mos meaning 'marsh' or 'moss'.

Julian Byng, 1st Viscount Byng of Vimy lived at Thorpe Hall in Thorpe-le-Soken and is buried at the 11th-century Parish Church of St Leonard in Beaumont-cum-Moze.

Beaumont Cut is a derelict canal in the parish.

== Governance ==
Beaumont-cum-Moze is part of the electoral ward called Beaumont and Thorpe. The population of this ward at the 2011 Census was 2,300.

Location within Essex
