= Landermere Wharf =

Hamlet in Essex, England

Coordinates: 51.8703°N 1.1938°E

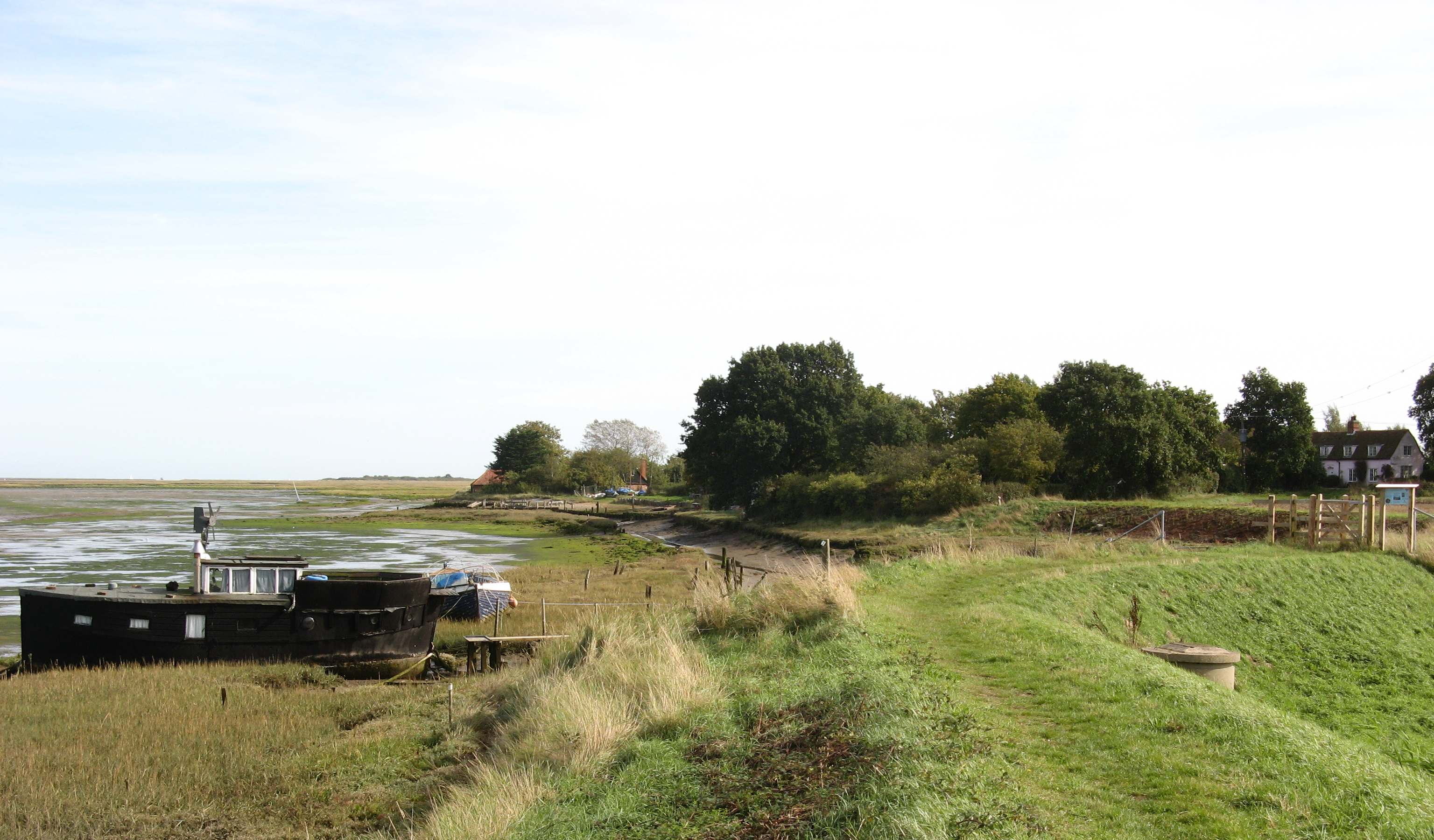
A distant view of Landermere Wharf

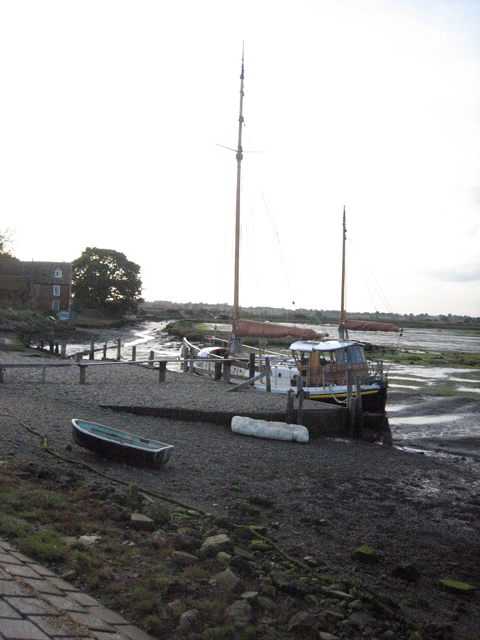
The quay

Landermere Wharf, sometimes called Landermere Quay, is a former dock area suitable for lying at anchor in the Tendring district of Essex, England.

The wharf was first used in the Elizabethan era, and was sold in 1760 to Richard Rigby. The main cargo was coal, corn and Scandinavian wood. The area had a tide mill in 1292, which was rebuilt in 1493, but no trace remains now.

In 1954, resident artists Eduardo Paolozzi and Nigel Henderson (artist) established Hammer Prints Limited, which traded their designs for wallpapers, textiles and ceramics from premises there until 1975.

It is now primarily a small residential hamlet in the administrative area of Thorpe-le-Soken.

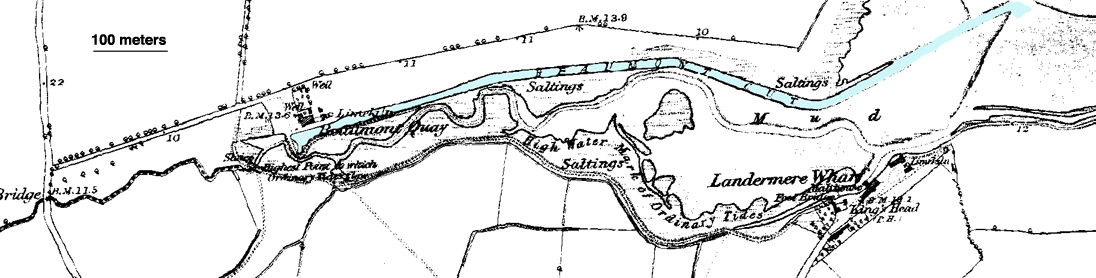
Beaumont Cut, from Beaumont Quay past Landermere Wharf to Hamford Water, 1880
