= Julian Byng, 1st Viscount Byng of Vimy =

British Army officer & 12th Governor-General of Canada (1862-1935)

Field Marshal The Right Honourable The Viscount Byng of Vimy GCB GCMG MVO
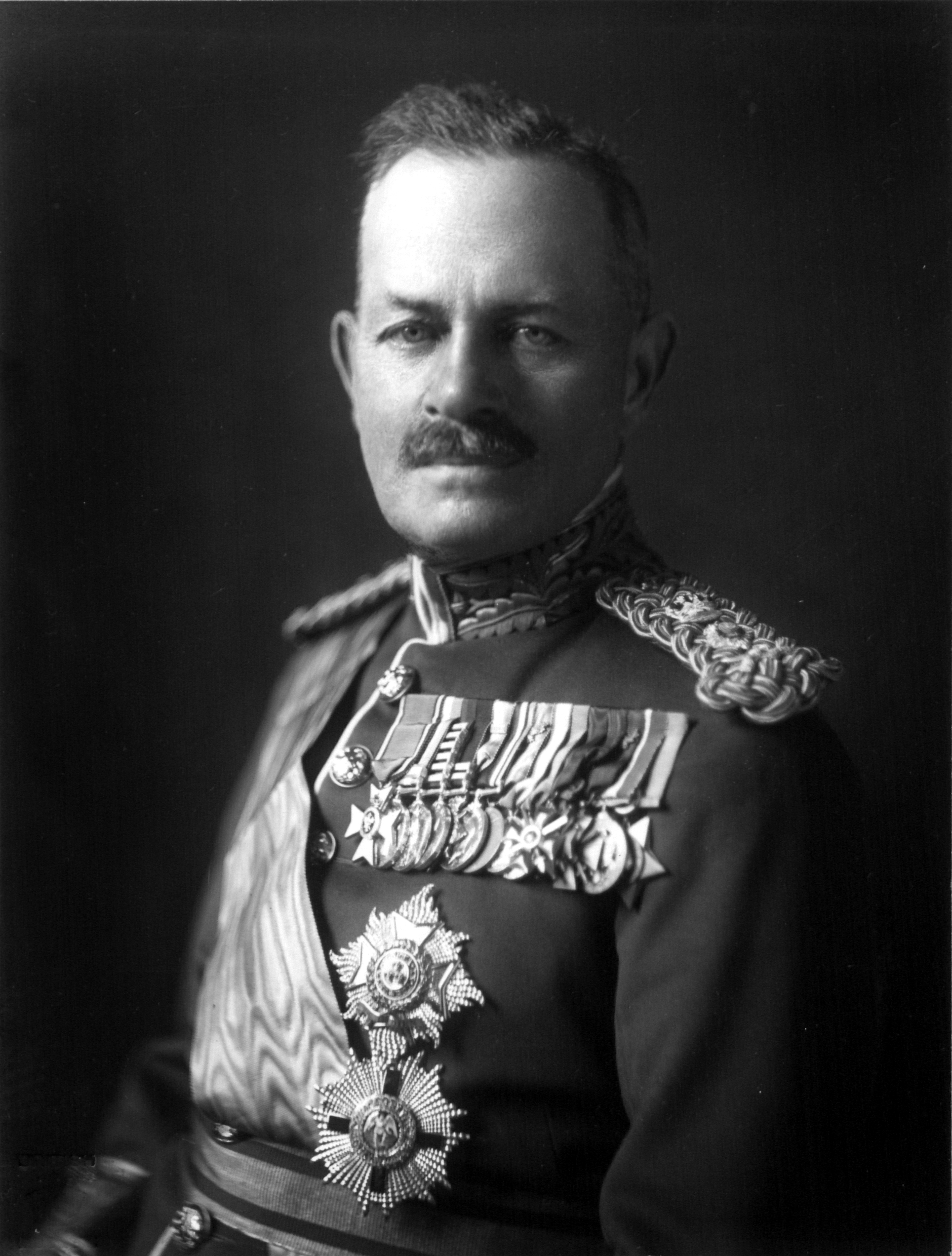
- Byng in 1921

12th Governor General of Canada
- In office 2 August 1921 – 5 August 1926
- Monarch: George V
- Prime Minister: Canadian; • Arthur Meighen • W. L. M. King; British; • David Lloyd George • Bonar Law • Stanley Baldwin • Ramsay MacDonald
- Preceded by: The Duke of Devonshire
- Succeeded by: The Viscount Willingdon

More...

Personal details
- Born: Julian Hedworth George Byng; 11 September 1862 Wrotham Park, Hertfordshire, England
- Died: 6 June 1935 (aged 72) Thorpe Hall, Essex, England
- Spouse: Marie Evelyn Moreton (m. 1902)
- Profession: Officer
- Military career
- Allegiance: United Kingdom
- Branch: British Army
- Service years: 1879–1919
- Rank: Field Marshal
- Nickname: Bungo
- Commands: Third Army; Canadian Corps; XVII Corps; IX Corps; British Troops in Egypt; 1st Cavalry Brigade; 2nd Cavalry Brigade; 10th Royal Hussars; South African Light Horse
- Conflicts: Mahdist War; Battles of El Teb; Battle of Tamai; Second Boer War; First World War; First Battle of Ypres; Gallipoli campaign; Battle of Vimy Ridge; Battle of Cambrai; Hundred Days Offensive
- Awards: Knight Grand Cross of the Order of the Bath; Knight Grand Cross of the Order of St Michael and St George; Member of the Royal Victorian Order; Mentioned in Despatches (8)

Field Marshal Julian Hedworth George Byng, 1st Viscount Byng of Vimy (11 September 1862 – 6 June 1935), was a British Army officer who served as Governor General of Canada, the 12th since the Canadian Confederation.

Known to friends as "Bungo", Byng was born to a noble family at Wrotham Park in Hertfordshire, England and educated at Eton College, along with his brothers. Upon graduation, he received a commission as a militia officer and saw service in Egypt and Sudan before enrolling in the Staff College, Camberley. There, he befriended individuals who would be his contemporaries when he attained senior rank in France. Following distinguished service during the First World War—specifically, with the British Expeditionary Force in France, in the Battle of Gallipoli, as commander of the Canadian Corps at Vimy Ridge, and as commander of the British Third Army—Byng was elevated to the peerage in 1919.

In 1921, King George V, on the recommendation of Prime Minister David Lloyd George, appointed him to replace Victor Cavendish, 9th Duke of Devonshire as Canada's governor general, a post he occupied until Freeman Freeman-Thomas, 1st Viscount Willingdon succeeded him in 1926. Byng proved to be popular with Canadians due to his war leadership, though his stepping directly into political affairs became the catalyst for widespread changes to the role of the Crown in all of the British Dominions.

After his viceregal tenure, Byng returned to the UK to be appointed Commissioner of Police of the Metropolis and was promoted within the peerage to become Viscount Byng of Vimy. Three years after attaining the rank of field marshal, he died at his home, Thorpe Hall, on 6 June 1935.

== Early life ==
Byng was born at the family seat of Wrotham Park, in Hertfordshire, as the seventh son and 13th and youngest child of George Byng, 2nd Earl of Strafford (who, due to the size of his family, ran a relatively frugal household) and Harriet Elizabeth Cavendish, daughter of Charles Cavendish, 1st Baron Chesham. Until the age of 17, Byng was enrolled at Eton College, although he did not enter the sixth form.

At Eton Byng first received the nickname "Bungo"—to distinguish him from his elder brothers "Byngo" and "Bango". His time at the college was undistinguished, and he received poor reports. Indicative of his attitude towards academics, he once traded his Latin grammar book and his brother Lionel's best trousers to a hawker for a pair of ferrets and a pineapple. Byng later claimed that he had been the school's worst "Scug", the colloquial term for an undistinguished boy.

== Early military career ==
Byng was from a military family, his grandfather having served with Wellington at the Battle of Waterloo. With three brothers already in the army and another already put up for the 7th Queen's Own Hussars, Byng's father did not think he could afford a regular army commission for his youngest son. Thus, at the age of 17, Byng was instead sent into the militia and on 12 December 1879 commissioned as a second lieutenant into the 2nd (Edmonton) Royal Middlesex Rifles (later the 7th Battalion, King's Royal Rifle Corps). (Note: In the book Byng of Vimy: General and Governor General by Jeffrey Williams, Byng's date of commissioning is given as 27 August 1879.) He was promoted to lieutenant on 23 April 1881. During this period, Byng also developed a liking for theatre and music halls, and by the age of twenty had taken an interest in the banjo.

At a meeting of the Jockey Club in 1882, Byng's father was asked about his sons by his long-time friend, Albert Edward, Prince of Wales. Upon hearing that Byng had not yet found a permanent career, the Prince offered a place for him in his own regiment, the 10th Royal Hussars. This was the most expensive regiment in the army, and the Earl of Strafford could only afford to give Byng two hundred of the six hundred pounds he would need each year, but the Prince's offer could not be refused. Byng himself was delighted at the opportunity, as both his uncle, William Cavendish, 2nd Baron Chesham, and his cousin, Charles Cavendish, had served in the regiment. By raising money through buying polo ponies cheaply, using his excellent horsemanship to train them, and then selling them on at a profit, Byng was able to transfer to the 10th Royal Hussars on 27 January 1883, and less than three months later he joined the regiment in Lucknow, India.

It was while the regiment was on the way home to Great Britain in 1884 that the Hussars were diverted to the Sudan to join the Suakin Expedition, and on 29 February Byng, along with the rest of his regiment, rode in the first line of the charge at the first Battle of El Teb. The attack, which resulted in the deaths of both of Byng's squadron's other officers, was unsuccessful, and fighting continued, with Byng's horse being killed under him on 13 March at the Battle of Tamai. Most of the rebels were then dispersed shortly after, and on 29 March the regiment re-embarked for Britain, arriving on 22 April, and proceeding to their new base at Shorncliffe Army Camp in Kent. During the summer of 1884, Byng spent much of his time playing polo and training recruits and horses, and in July, for his services in Sudan, he was mentioned in despatches.

In June 1885, the regiment was relocated to the South Cavalry Barracks at Aldershot, where the Prince of Wales' eldest son, Prince Albert Victor, joined the regiment and thereafter the Prince of Wales and his other son, Prince George, became frequent visitors. Byng struck up a friendship with both Albert Victor and George, but did not socialise with them much outside of army circles. Byng was appointed as the regimental adjutant on 20 October 1886, only nine days before the death of his father, who left Byng a watch and £3,500. The regiment then moved again in 1887 to the barracks at Hounslow, where, after suspecting that contractors were selling him inferior meat, Byng spent several early mornings at the Smithfield market to learn the meat trade, eventually proving his case and having the contractors changed. It was also at this time that Byng became acquainted with Montagu Corry, 1st Baron Rowton, who, along with the Guinness Trust, was trying to improve housing for skilled workers in London. Byng accompanied Rowton around the poorest areas of the city and suggested that retired senior soldiers from the rank-and-file be hired to maintain order in the Rowton Houses that Rowton had set up, thus starting a long-lived tradition.

== Further career ==
In 1888, the Hussars again moved, this time to York, where Byng kept his men busy by raising successful cricket and football teams. Byng was promoted to captain on 4 January 1890, around the time he began to consider entering the Staff College, Camberley. He thus, in order to dedicate his time to preparatory studies, which continued when the regiment moved in 1891 to Ireland, resigned his commission as adjutant and turned down an invitation from Prince Albert Victor to join him in India as an equerry. After being detached for a time in order to serve and gain more experience in the infantry and artillery, Byng sat and passed his entrance exams into the Staff College and secured a nomination in September 1892. A year before Byng entered the college, Albert Victor fell victim to the influenza pandemic that raged around the world, and, at the Prince's funeral on 20 January 1892, Byng commanded the pallbearers (all from the 10th Royal Hussars), which was a significant display of trust shown Byng by the Prince of Wales.

Once Byng was enrolled at the Staff College, he found amongst his fellow students men with whom he would be closely associated more than two decades later—Henry Rawlinson, Henry Hughes Wilson, Thomas D'Oyly Snow, and James Aylmer Lowthorpe Haldane—and in 1894, while en route to visit a friend at Aldershot, travelled with a cadet at the nearby Sandhurst, Winston Churchill. Byng also journeyed with his class to see the battlefields of the Franco-Prussian War at Alsace-Lorraine and accompanied to the United States one of his lecturers who was compiling information on a book on Stonewall Jackson. By December 1894, Byng graduated from the Staff College and was immediately appointed to command A Squadron of the hussars. Only three years later, though, the regiment returned to Aldershot and Byng left to become adjutant of the 1st Cavalry Brigade, shortly before becoming the Deputy Assistant Adjutant-General (DAAG) of the Aldershot Command, and was promoted to the rank of major on 4 May 1898. Later that same year, Byng met at a local party Marie Evelyn Moreton, the only daughter of Sir Richard Charles Moreton, who had himself served as comptroller at the Canadian royal and viceroyal residence of Rideau Hall, under the then Governor General of Canada John Campbell, Marquess of Lorne. Evelyn, as she was known, later described her early encounters with Byng:

When we met of a morning out riding, if he was free, the fun began—though it wasn't always fun for me because I was bewildered, as he was never the same two days running. Talk of women being mutable—he could have given points and a beating to any one of them! On Monday he would be in his most enchanting mood; Tuesday he would treat me as a pal and a man; Wednesday he would hardly remember that I existed; Thursday he would be icily polite; Friday he would thaw a little and by Saturday be back in Monday's delightful mood! What could anybody make of such vagaries?

== South Africa and rise to high command ==
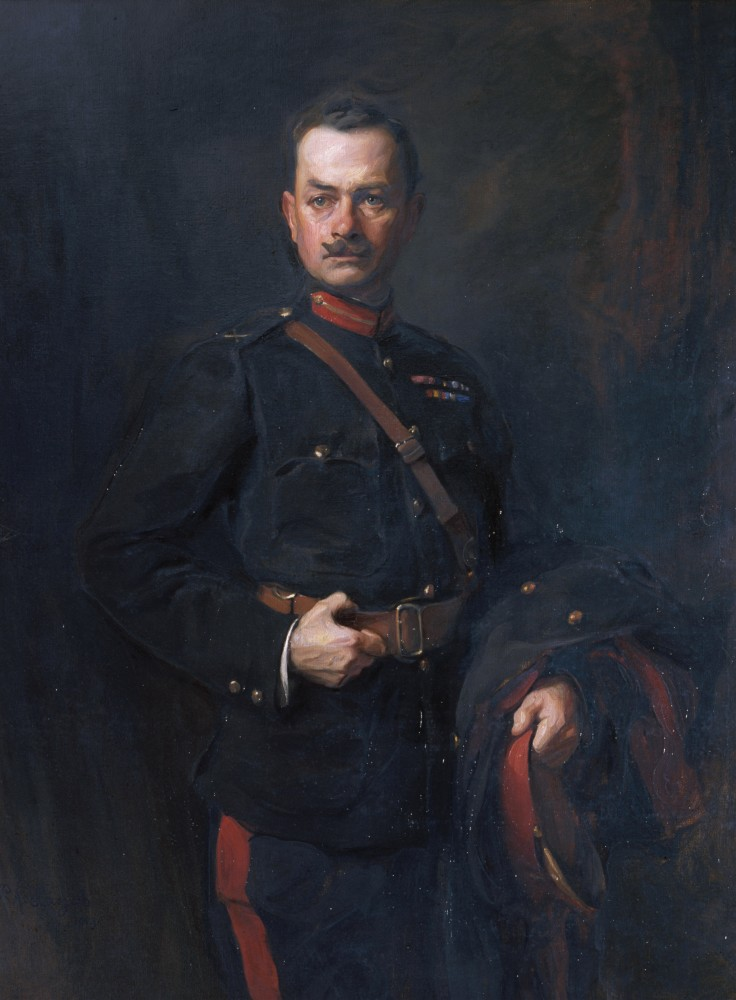
A portrait of Byng by Philip Alexius de Laszlo as GOC 1st Cavalry Brigade, 1907.

Byng was deployed in November 1899 to South Africa, where he was to act as a provost marshal, but was instead immediately given the local rank of lieutenant colonel and tasked with raising and commanding the South African Light Horse during the Second Boer War. Byng thereafter served on the front lines, during which time he ended up in command of a group of columns, was mentioned in despatches five times, including by Lord Kitchener on 23 June 1902.)

In November 1900, he was promoted to brevet lieutenant colonel and in February 1902 to brevet colonel. The beginning of 1902 brought more significant events for Byng, with his return to England in March, an audience with King Edward VII the following month, at which he was appointed to the Royal Victorian Order as a member 4th class (MVO), and his marriage to Moreton at St Paul's Church, Knightsbridge, on 30 April 1902.

Following a second visit to the King in early October, Byng was sent back to India to command the 10th Royal Hussars at Mhow and was appointed to the rank of a substantive lieutenant colonel on 11 October 1902.

In his first two years of marriage, Byng's wife suffered several miscarriages, resulting in the declaration that she would be unable to bear children. By January 1904, Byng had also, while playing polo, broken his right elbow so severely that it was feared he would have to quit the Army. After four months' treatment in England, though, he was pronounced to be again fit for duty and in May became the first commandant of the new cavalry school at Netheravon House.

On 11 May 1905, Byng was made commander of the 2nd Cavalry Brigade at Canterbury, with the simultaneous temporary rank of brigadier general and substantive rank of colonel. After an appointment in the 1906 Birthday Honours as a Companion of the Order of the Bath (CB) in June 1906, he was again back in Aldershot, in command of the 1st Cavalry Brigade.

It was April 1909 when Byng was promoted to major general and, though he was placed on half pay, Byng—with added income from editing the Cavalry Journal and serving as the first North Essex district commissioner for the Boy Scouts—purchased his first house, Newton Hall, in Dunmow, Essex. He would, however, only reside there for two years, as, exactly the same amount of time after taking command of the East Anglian Division of the Territorial Force (TF) in October 1910.

In May 1912 he became colonel of the 3rd (King's Own) Hussars.

== First World War ==
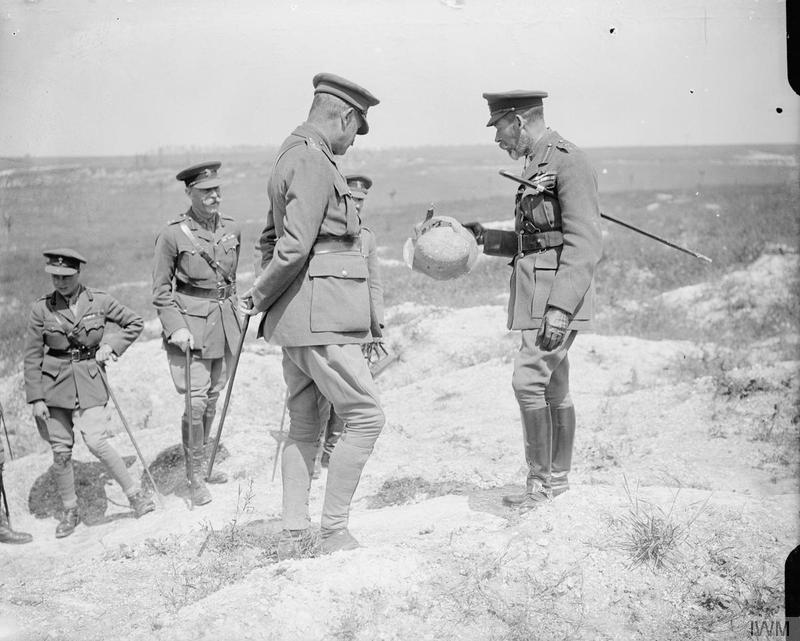
The prince of Wales, the earl of Athlone, General Byng, and King George V with a German helmet on Thiepval Ridge, July 1917.

In October 1912 Byng became GOC British Troops in Egypt, where he remained until the outbreak of the First World War in the summer of 1914. Kitchener, then on leave on England and soon to become secretary of state for war, recalled Byng back to Britain to become GOC of the newly created 3rd Cavalry Division. This he did in late September, and, with his division, soon departed for the Western Front, landing at Ostend on 8 October, to reinforce the British Expeditionary Force (BEF). Both he and his division soon saw action at the First Battle of Ypres towards the end of the month, which lasted over four weeks. His actions there were rewarded in March 1915 with appointment as a Knight Commander of the Order of St. Michael and St. George.

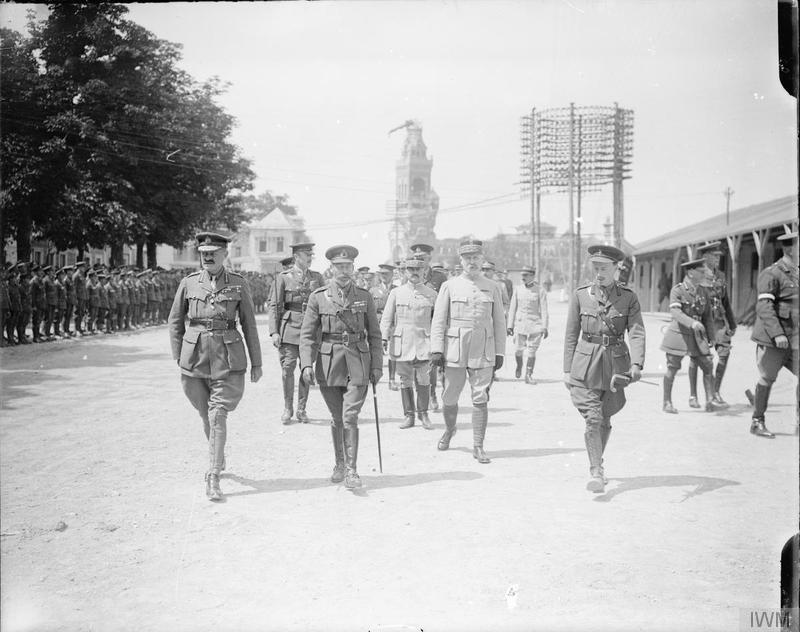
General Byng, commander of the Third Army; King George V; and General Phillipe Petain, the C-in-C of the French Army, in Albert, France, July 1917. Note the Cathedral (Basilica of Notre-Dame de Brebières) with the knocked over statue of the Golden Virgin in the background.

Beginning in May 1915, Byng served as GOC of the Cavalry Corps, at which time he was also made a temporary lieutenant-general, which he led during the Second Battle of Ypres. After this, Byng was sent to Gallipoli to head the IX Corps and supervise the successful withdrawal of the British, Australian, and New Zealand forces from there.

Byng's role in the campaign was significant, particularly during the evacuation phase. He was sent to Gallipoli in August 1915 to command the IX Corps, taking over from Major General Beauvoir De Lisle, who had been commanding the corps temporarily in the absence of Lieutenant General Sir Frederick Stopford. Byng arrived around 12 August and oversaw the withdrawal of British, Australian, and New Zealand forces from Suvla Bay and Anzac Cove.

The evacuation from Gallipoli, which took place between December 1915 and January 1916, was a remarkable success, with minimal losses. Byng implemented innovative tactics, such as dummy troops and silent rifle fire, to deceive the Turks and ensure a safe extraction. He worked closely with other Allied commanders, including Lieutenant General Sir William Birdwood, commanding the Australian and New Zealand Army Corps, to coordinate the evacuation efforts.

For this, he was on 1 January 1916 elevated within the Order of the Bath to the rank of Knight Commander, but was not allowed much rest, as he spent the next month commanding the Suez Canal defences before returning to the Western Front to lead the XVII Corps. He assumed command of the corps on 27 February, when he was re-granted the temporary rank of lieutenant general.

By May, however, he found himself in command of the Canadian Corps–"which was generally regarded, not least by those in it, as one of the crack formations on the Western Front"–and was promoted when, for distinguished service, the king made substantive Byng's rank of lieutenant-general. He led the corps in the Battle of the Somme later in the year.

A good soldier, he swiftly became popular with the Canadian troops, who sometimes referred to themselves as 'The Byng Boys' after a popular music-hall act of the day.

Byng's greatest glory then came when he led the Canadian victory in April 1917 at the Battle of Vimy Ridge, a historic military milestone for the dominion that inspired nationalism at home.

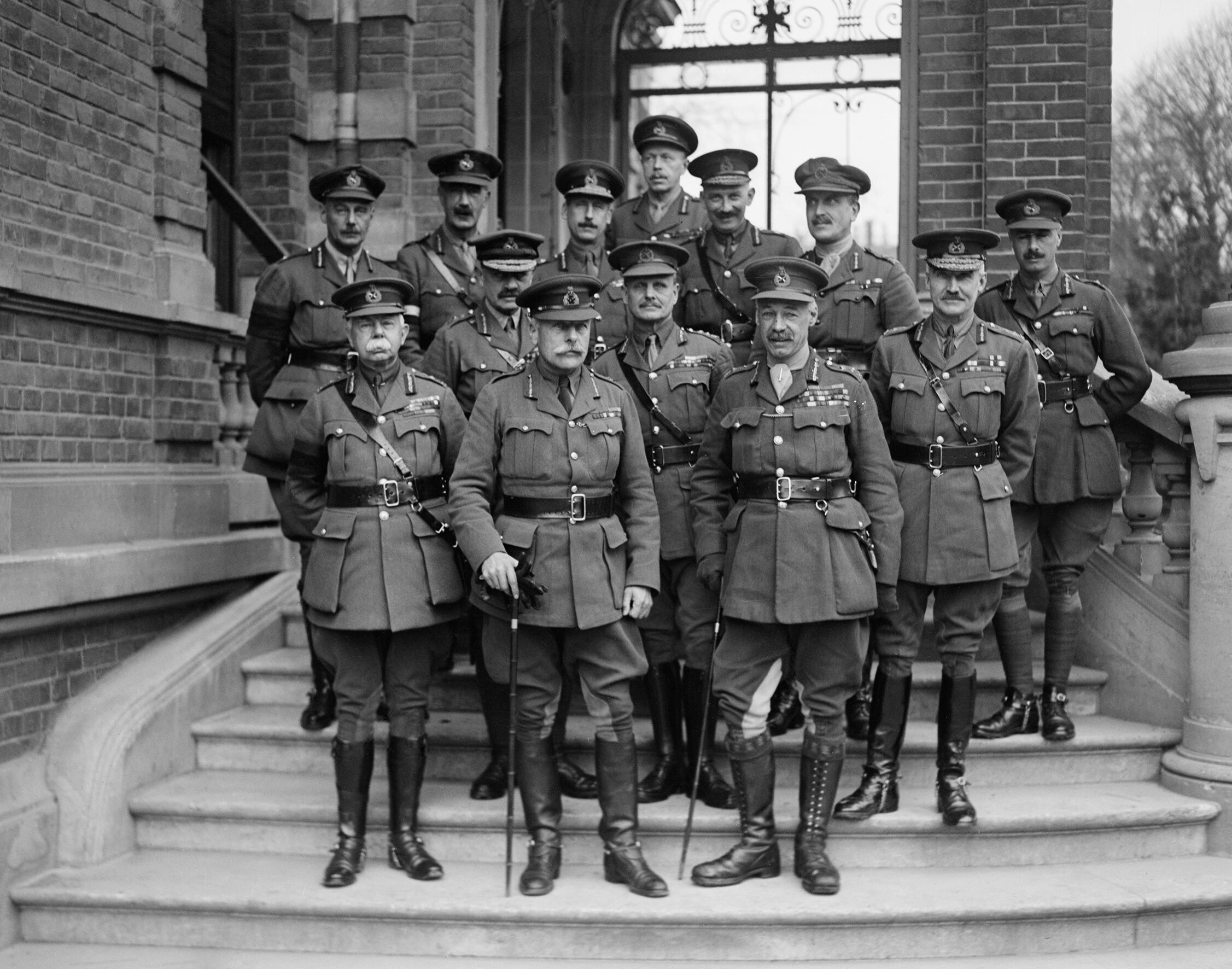
Field Marshal Sir Douglas Haig (centre front) with his senior commanders and staff officers at Cambrai, France, November 1918. Stood in the second row, directly behind Haig, is General Byng, GOC Third Army.

In June 1917, and by now holding the temporary rank of general, Byng was rewarded for his success at Vimy Ridge and succeeded General Sir Edmund Allenby in command of Britain's largest field army, the Third Army, which he was to lead until the cessation of hostilities some seventeen months later. With his Third Army having missed the Battle of Passchendaele, Byng led the Army in the First Battle of Cambrai in November, conducting the first surprise attack using tanks.

The battle–described by historian Robin Neillands as "the great 'might-have-been' of the Great War"–was later considered a turning point in the war and Byng was honoured on 24 November 1917 by having his temporary rank of general made substantive. According to the war memoirs of Arthur S. Bullock, the battle failed to breach the Hindenburg Line, due to a lack of reserves, and it was at General Byng's second attempt to take Cambrai in 1918 that the British triumphed, owing to sufficient troops and supplies being in place "to sustain the attack day and night until the Germans were broken".

The Germans launched their spring offensive on 21 March 1918, which continued over the following weeks and managed to inflict heavy losses on Byng's Third Army, although it was able to retreat without breaking his line.

By the summer of 1918 the tide of the war began to turn in favour of the Allies. Byng's Third Army launched an attack on the Germans on 21 August, where, on 27 September, it managed to break through the Hindenburg Line before continuing on to Maubeuge, which was reached on 10 November, the day before the Armistice with Germany.

== Post-war ==
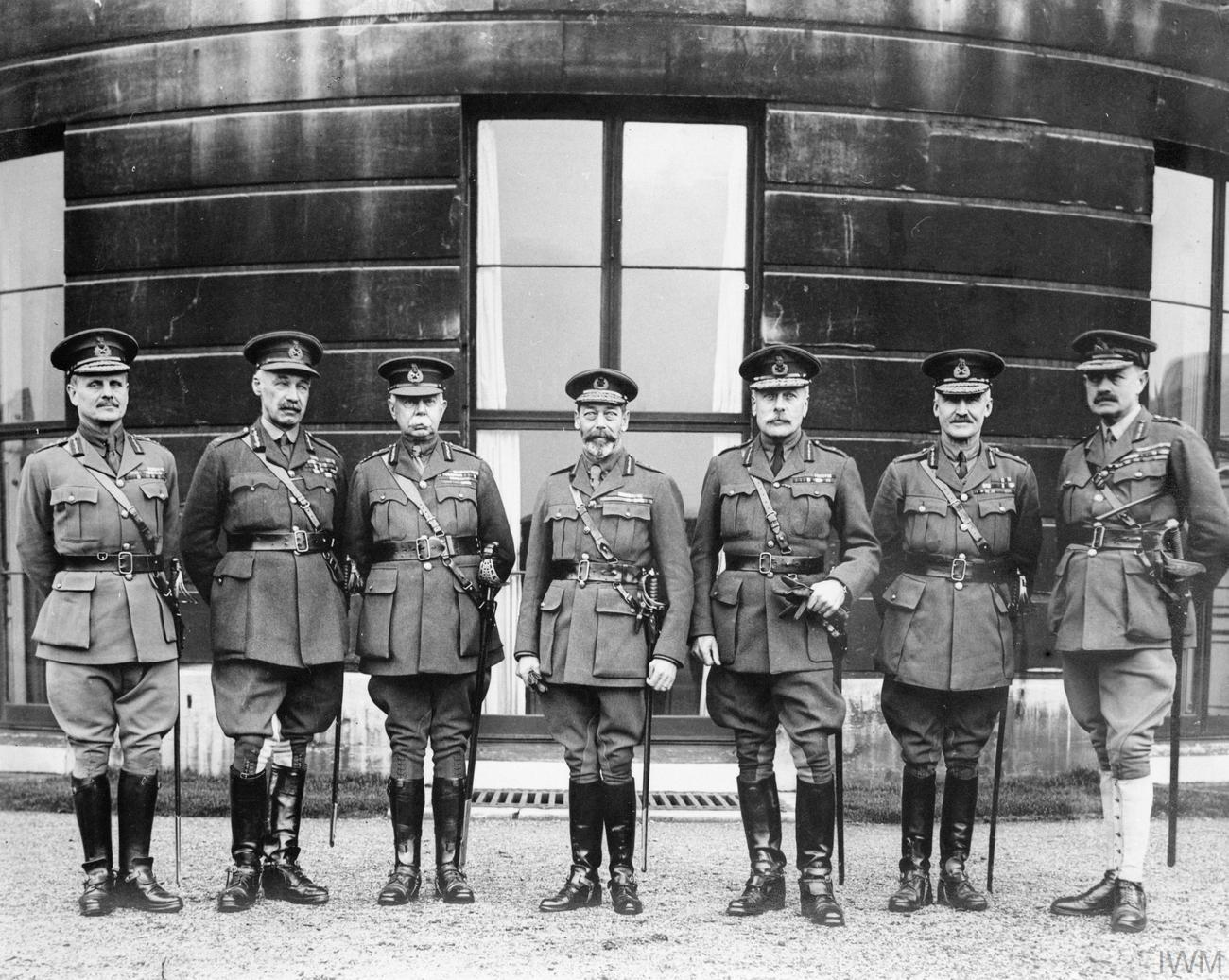
King George V (centre) with his senior commanders at Buckingham Palace, 19 December 1918. From left to right: William Birdwood, Henry Rawlinson, Herbert Plumer, George V, Douglas Haig, Henry Horne, Julian Byng.

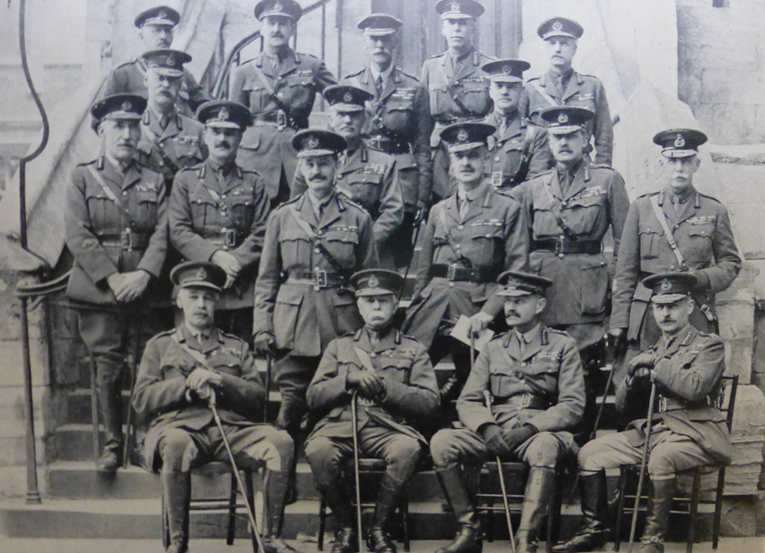
Eighteen Old Etonian generals revisit Eton, May 1919. General Byng is in the front row, second from the right.

As a result of the success at Cambrai, Byng was made a Knight Grand Cross of the Order of the Bath in the 1919 New Year's Honours. In the United States, Byng's exploits during the First World War were commemorated near the town of Ada, Oklahoma, when in 1917 a post office and power plant were named after him, leading to the later emergence of the town of Byng.

Byng was in his own right elevated on 7 October 1919 to the peerage as Baron Byng of Vimy, of Thorpe-le-Soken in the County of Essex. In November, he was offered Southern Command, but turned it down on the grounds that he did not wish to harm the promotion prospects of more junior officers.

Byng therefore retired from the army in November 1919 and moved to Thorpe Hall. In April 1921, he unveiled the Chipping Barnet War Memorial, near to his family seat of Wrotham Park.

== Governor General of Canada ==
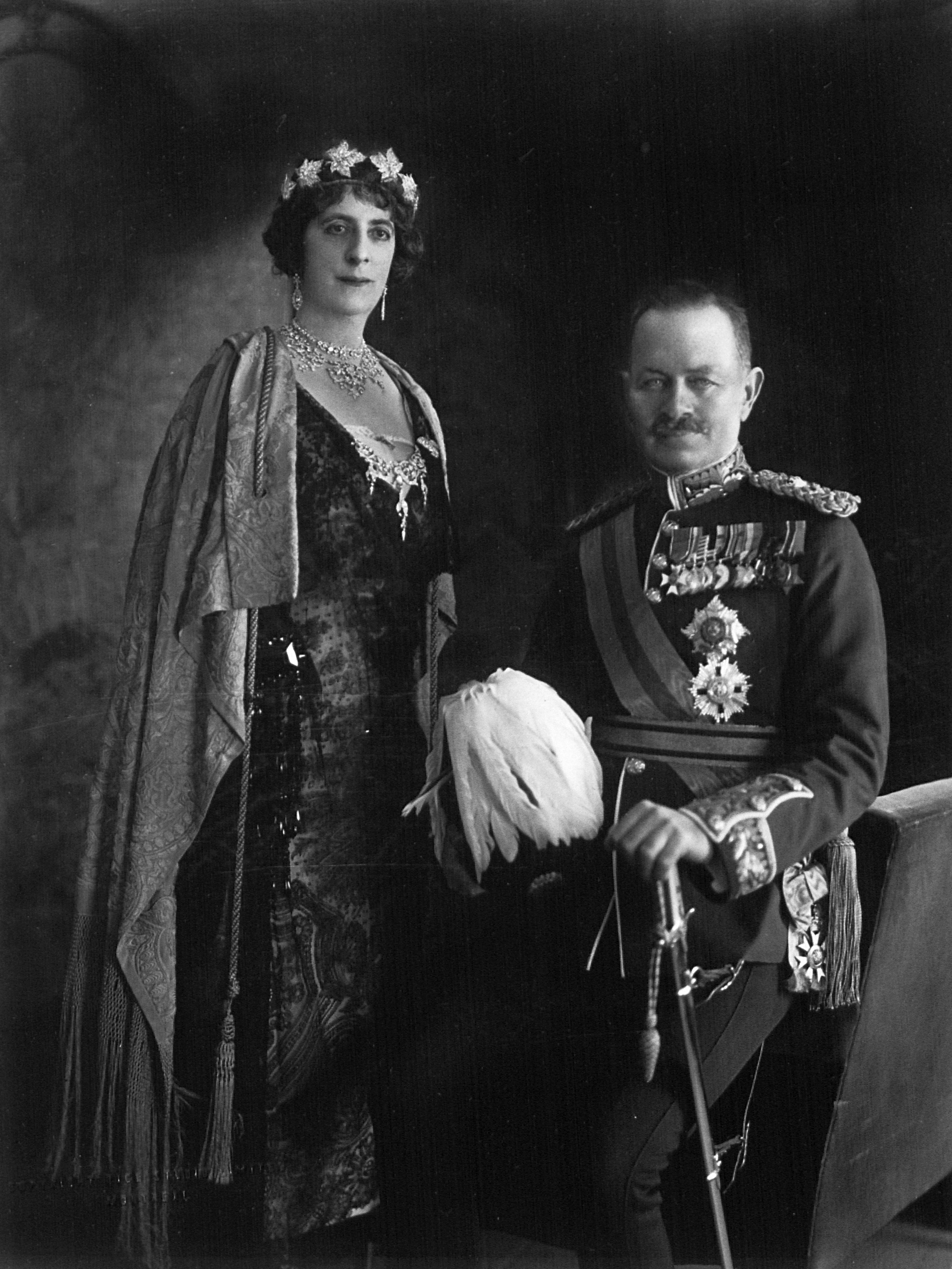
The Baron and Baroness Byng of Vimy as the viceregal couple of Canada.

After Byng was made in July 1921 a Knight Grand Cross of the Order of St. Michael and St. George, it was announced on 2 August that King George V had approved the recommendation of his British prime minister, David Lloyd George, to appoint Byng as his representative in Canada. The designation proved less controversial than his predecessor, Victor Cavendish, 9th Duke of Devonshire, due partly to the General's popularity, but also because the practice of prior consultation with the Canadian prime minister, at that time Arthur Meighen, was revived. Byng had not been Meighen's first choice for presentation to the King, since he preferred someone with more civilian credentials. Nevertheless, Byng was eventually chosen because he was both willing and available.

The Governor General travelled the length and breadth of the country, meeting with Canadians wherever he went. He also immersed himself in Canada's culture and came to particularly love ice hockey, rarely missing a game played by the Ottawa Senators. His wife Lady Byng, also a hockey fan, would donate a trophy to the National Hockey League starting in 1925 to be handed out each year to the player who best exhibited gentlemanly and sportsmanlike conduct on the ice while maintaining a high level of play; the trophy, known as the Lady Byng Memorial Trophy, is still awarded to this day.

He was fond of the Royal Agricultural Winter Fair, held each year in Toronto, and established the Governor General's Cup to be presented at the competition. He was the first Governor General of Canada to appoint Canadians as his aides-de-camp (one of whom was future Governor General Georges Vanier) and approached his vice-regal role with enthusiasm, gaining popularity with Canadians on top of that received from the men he had commanded on the European battlefields. Lord Byng also named and inaugurated the first annual Warriors' Day Parade military parade in Toronto in 1921.

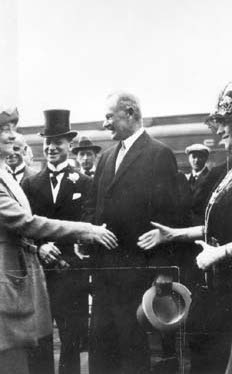
Lord Byng at Calgary, Alberta, 1922

=== King–Byng Affair ===
While it had been acceptable prior to the turn of the 20th century for Canadian governors general to involve themselves in political affairs, being, as they were, representatives of the King in his British Council, Byng's tenure as governor general was notable in that he became the first to step directly into political matters since the country had gained a degree of further autonomy following the First World War. In the summer of 1926 he denied the recommendation of his prime minister, William Lyon Mackenzie King, who sought to have parliament dissolved in order to avoid a vote of non-confidence in his government. The Governor General's course of action in what came to be colloquially known as the King–Byng Affair remains debated, though the consensus amongst constitutional historians is that Byng's moves were appropriate under the circumstances.

Mackenzie King made much of the scenario and its outcome in the election that eventually followed on 14 September, in which King's Liberal Party won a plurality of seats in the House of Commons, while Meighen lost his seat. As a result, King was again appointed prime minister. At the 1926 Imperial Conference, King used Byng and his refusal to follow his prime minister's advice as the impetus for widespread constitutional change throughout the British Commonwealth.

Byng said of the matter: "I have to await the verdict of history to prove my having adopted a wrong course, and this I do with an easy conscience that, right or wrong, I have acted in the interests of Canada and implicated no one else in my decision."

== Post-viceregal life ==
Byng returned to England on 30 September 1926. In January 1928, he was created Viscount Byng of Vimy, of Thorpe-le-Soken in the County of Essex. Later that year, he was appointed as the Commissioner of the Metropolitan Police.

Before his retirement in 1931, he introduced a number of changes to the force, including a system of promotion based on merit rather than length of service, improvement in discipline, retirement of inefficient senior officers, an irregularity to policemen's beats (which had previously allowed criminals to work out the system), police boxes, the extensive use of police cars, and a central radio control room. In July 1932, Byng was once more promoted in the British military to the rank of field marshal—the highest rank an officer can attain. He died suddenly of an abdominal blockage at Thorpe Hall on 6 June 1935.

Lord Byng of Vimy was buried at the 11th-century parish church of St Leonard in Beaumont-cum-Moze.

== Honours ==
Viceregal styles of The Viscount Byng of Vimy (1921–1926)
- Reference style: His Excellency The Right Honourable; Son Excellence le très honourable
- Spoken style: Your Excellency; Votre Excellence

=== Appointments ===

- (United Kingdom) 29 June 1906 – 1 January 1916: Companion of the Most Honourable Order of the Bath (CB)
  - 1 January 1916 – 1 January 1919: Knight Commander of the Most Honourable Order of the Bath (KCB)
  - 1 January 1919 – 6 June 1935: Knight Grand Cross of the Most Honourable Order of the Bath (GCB)
- (United Kingdom) March 1915 – July 1921: Knight Commander of the Most Distinguished Order of Saint Michael and Saint George (KCMG)
  - July 1921 – 6 June 1935: Knight Grand Cross of the Most Distinguished Order of Saint Michael and Saint George (GCMG)
- (United Kingdom) 2 May 1902 – 6 June 1935: Member (fourth class) of the Royal Victorian Order (MVO)
- 2 August 1921 – 5 August 1926: Chief Scout for Canada

=== Medals ===
- (United Kingdom) 1884: Egypt Medal with "El-Teb-Tamaai" clasp
- (United Kingdom) 1899: Queen's South Africa Medal with "Cape Colony", "Tugela Heights", "Orange Free State", "Relief of Ladysmith", "Laing's Nek", and "Belfast" clasps
- (United Kingdom) 1901: King's South Africa Medal with "South Africa 1901" and "South Africa 1902" clasps
- (United Kingdom) 1918: 1914 Star with clasp
- (United Kingdom) 1919: British War Medal
- (United Kingdom) 1919: Victory Medal
- (United Kingdom) 1897: Queen Victoria Diamond Jubilee Medal
- (United Kingdom) 1911: King George V Coronation Medal

=== Awards ===
- (United Kingdom) 6 February 1900: Mentioned in Despatches
- (United Kingdom) 23 June 1902: Mentioned in Despatches
- (United Kingdom) 11 December 1915: Mentioned in Despatches
- (United Kingdom) 11 December 1915: Mentioned in Despatches
- (United Kingdom) 22 December 1915: Mentioned in Despatches
- (United Kingdom) 20 February 1918: Mentioned in Despatches
- (United Kingdom) 20 July 1918: Mentioned in Despatches
- (United Kingdom) 21 December 1918: Mentioned in Despatches

=== Foreign honours ===
- 1884: Khedive's Star
- (Russia) 12 September 1916: Order of St Vladimir, 4th Class (with Swords)
- (Belgium) 8 March 1918: Croix de guerre
- (France) 29 January 1919 – 6 June 1935: Grand officier de Légion d'honneur
- (France) 11 March 1919: Croix de guerre
- (United States) 12 July 1919: Distinguished Service Medal
- (Kingdom of Serbia) 24 October 1919 – 6 June 1935: Grand Cross With Swords of the Order of the White Eagle

=== Arms ===
Coat of arms of Julian Byng, 1st Viscount Byng of Vimy
Crest 1st out of a mural crown a dexter arm embowed grasping the colours of the 31st Regiment and pendent from the wrist by a ribbon the gold cross presented by command for Lord Stafford's gallant achievement all Proper and on a scroll the word "Mouguerre" 2nd a heraldic antelope statant Ermine attired Or. Escutcheon Quarterly Sable and Argent in the first quarter a lion rampant of the second over all in bend sinister a representation of the colours of the 31st Regiment, a crescent Gules for difference. Supporters Dexter a heraldic antelope Ermine attired Or sinister a lion Or each charged on the shoulder with a rose Gules. Orders The Most Honourable Order of the Bath - Knight Grand Cross (GCB); The Most Distinguished Order of St. Michael and St. George - Knight Grand Cross (GCMG); The Royal Victorian Order - Member fourth class (MVO).

=== Honorary military appointments ===
- (Canada) 2 August 1921 – 5 August 1926: Colonel of the Governor General's Horse Guards
- (Canada) 2 August 1921 – 5 August 1926: Colonel of the Governor General's Foot Guards
- (Canada) 2 August 1921 – 5 August 1926: Colonel of the Canadian Grenadier Guards

=== Honorary degrees ===
- (Canada) Ontario 1921: University of Toronto, Doctor of Laws (LL.D)
- (Canada) Alberta 1922: University of Alberta, Doctor of Laws (LL.D)

=== Honorific eponyms ===
==== Geographic locations ====
- Alberta: Mount Byng
- British Columbia: Camp Byng, Roberts Creek
- Manitoba: Byng Place, Winnipeg
- Oklahoma: Byng
- Ontario: Byng Avenue, Toronto
- Saskatchewan: Byng Avenue, Saskatoon

==== Schools ====
- British Columbia: Lord Byng Elementary School, Richmond
- British Columbia: Lord Byng Secondary School, Vancouver
- Manitoba: General Byng School, Winnipeg
- Quebec: Baron Byng High School, Montreal

== See also ==
- List of World War I battles

== Sources ==
- Beckett, Ian F. W.; Corvi, Steven J. (2006). Haig's Generals. Barnsley: Pen & Sword Military. ISBN 978-1-84415-169-1.
- Heathcote, Tony (1999). The British Field Marshals, 1736–1997: A Biographical Dictionary. Barnsley: Leo Cooper. ISBN 0-85052-696-5.
- Hesilrige, Arthur G. M. (1921). Debrett's Peerage and Titles of courtesy. London: London: Dean & son, limited. p. 159.
- Turner, Alexander (2005). Vimy Ridge 1917: Byng's Canadians Triumph at Arras. Osprey Publishing. ISBN 978-1841768717.
- Williams, Jeffery (1983). Byng of Vimy: General and Governor General. Leo Cooper in association with Secker & Warburg. ISBN 978-0850523003.
- Neillands, Robin (1999). The Great War Generals on the Western Front 1914–1918. Robinson, 1999. ISBN 1841190632.

Military offices
Preceded by John Campbell	GOC East Anglian Division; 1910–1912	Succeeded by Charles Townshend
Preceded by Sir John Maxwell	GOC British Troops in Egypt; 1912–1914	Succeeded by Sir John Maxwell
Preceded by Frederick Stopford	GOC IX Corps; 1915–1916	Succeeded by Alexander Hamilton-Gordon
New title New post	GOC XVII Corps; January–May 1916	Succeeded by Sir Charles Fergusson
Preceded by Sir Edwin Alderson	GOC Canadian Corps; 1916–1917	Succeeded by Sir Arthur Currie
Preceded by Sir Edmund Allenby	GOC Third Army; 1917–1919	Post disbanded
Honorary titles
Preceded by Richard Blundell-Hollinshed-Blundell	Colonel of the 3rd (King's Own) Hussars; 1912–1924	Succeeded by Alfred Alexander Kennedy
Preceded by The Viscount Downe	Colonel of the 10th Royal Hussars; 1924–1935	Succeeded by The Viscount Hampden
Government offices
Preceded by The Duke of Devonshire	Governor General of Canada; 1921–1926	Succeeded by The Marquess of Willingdon
Police appointments
Preceded by Sir William Horwood	Commissioner of Police of the Metropolis; 1928–1931	Succeeded by The Lord Trenchard
Peerage of the United Kingdom
New creation	Viscount Byng of Vimy; 1928–1935	Extinct
New creation	Baron Byng of Vimy; 1919–1935	Extinct
