= Comarques, Thorpe-le-Soken =

Comarques
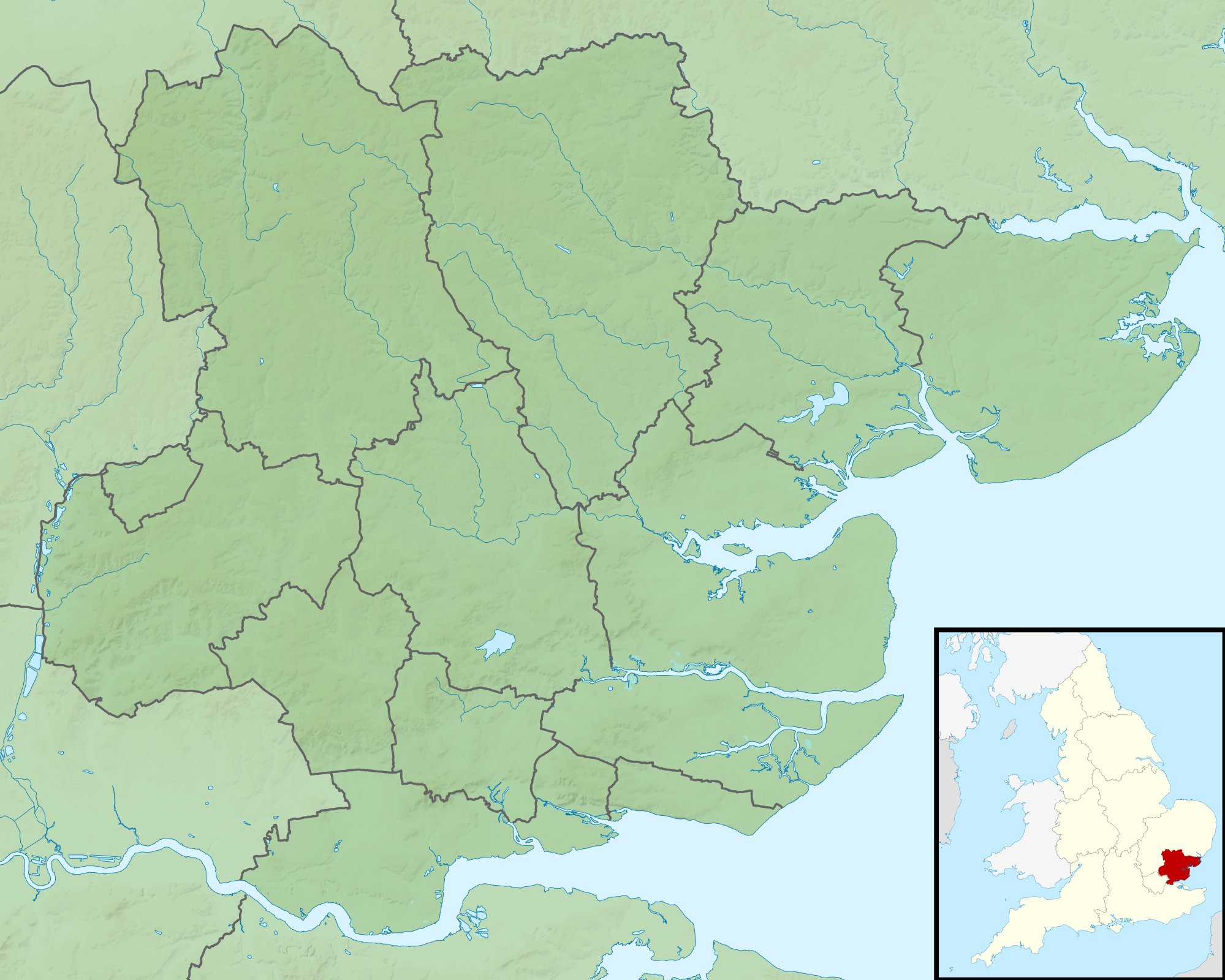
- Location within Essex
- 51.8599°N 1.1571°E
- Type: House
- Location: Thorpe-le-Soken, Essex

History
- Built: mid-18th century

Site notes
- Architect(s): Robert Taylor, attributed
- Architectural style: Queen Anne
- Governing body: Privately owned

Listed Building – Grade II*
- Official name: Comarques
- Designated: 29 April 1952
- Reference no.: 1112108

Comarques is an 18th-century country house in Thorpe-le-Soken, Essex, England. It has been attributed to the architect, Sir Robert Taylor. Named after Captain Comarque, a Huguenot refugee who owned the estate in the early 18th century, the house is in the Queen Anne style. The author Arnold Bennett lived at Comarques between 1913 and 1921. There is a tradition that Clement Attlee lived at the house as a child, but Historic England does not support this claim. Comarques is a Grade II* listed building.

== History ==
Captain Comarque was a French Huguenot refugee who, along with a number of others, settled in Thorpe-le-Soken in the early 18th century. Historic England confirms that he was resident in the area in 1717 but that he did not build the house. Pevsner notes the attribution to Sir Robert Taylor, an architect who worked mainly in London and the South-East of England. The building carries a brick datestone for 1755, with the name W. Whatey, who was probably the main building contractor for the house. Local tradition suggests that the house was the childhood home of Clement Attlee, later prime minister, having been bought by his father, Henry, in the late 19th century. Clement Attlee's most recent biographer, John Bew, records Henry Attlee as buying the estate in 1898, while Roy Jenkins in his biography of Attlee dates the purchase to 1897, and the draft Victoria County History for Essex records Henry Attlee as owner from 1898 to 1906. Historic England notes that Attlee's official biographer, Kenneth Harris, did not support the claim, and suggests that Henry Attlee was involved in the sale of the estate rather than its purchase. Kelly's Directory for Essex records Henry Attlee as occupying the property in 1899 and 1901.

In 1913, Comarques was bought by Arnold Bennett, then one of England's most successful novelists, from his considerable literary earnings. Soon after the purchase, Bennett wrote to an American correspondent; "we now possess an early Queen Anne house near the Essex coast and in February are going to install ourselves there definitely for everlasting". During his tenure, which lasted until his separation from his wife in 1921, Bennett amassed a considerable art collection, which was displayed at the house. (Note: Bennett also modernised the house, including the installation of a number of bathrooms, which was uncommon for the time. The letter to his American correspondent imagines prospective purchasers visiting the house after his death; "[the] landed gentry will wonder why the madman had 3 bathrooms in a home so small; they will not know that it was due solely to a visit to the U.S.A.".)

The estate was later owned by Albert Fairfax, 12th Lord Fairfax of Cameron. In 2010 the house was on the market.

== Architecture and description ==
The house is of two storeys, with attics, in Flemish bond red brick. One brick carries the date 1755. The style is Queen Anne. There are extensions from the 19th and 20th centuries. The house has seven bays and Pevsner notes the distinctive window style, which has been called Chinese Chippendale, and which is the main grounds for the attribution to Taylor. Comarques is a Grade II* listed building.

== Sources ==
- Bettley, James; Pevsner, Nikolaus (2007). Essex. The Buildings of England. New Haven, US and London: Yale University Press. ISBN 978-0-300-11614-4. OCLC 1042848015.
- Bew, John (2017). Citizen Clem: A Biography of Attlee. London: Riverrun. ISBN 978-1-780-87992-5.
- Drabble, Margaret (2012) [1974]. Arnold Bennett: A Biography. New York, US: Faber and Faber. ISBN 978-0-571-28746-8.
- Jenkins, Roy (1948). Mr. Attlee: an interim biography. London: Melbourne. OCLC 1141185790.
