= Nigel Henderson (artist) =

British photographer (1917–1985)

Nigel Graeme Henderson (1 April 1917 – 15 May 1985) was an English documentary artist, and photographer.

== Early life and education ==
He was born on 1 April 1917 to Kenneth Henderson and Winifred Ellen Henderson (née Lester). Henderson's parents divorced when he was young. His mother, Winifred "Wyn", inspired him to pursue a career in art. At the beginning of her career Wyn managed The Hours Press for Nancy Cunard. She left after an argument with Cunard, and returned to London to live in Bloomsbury, in Gordon Square. Nigel chose to live with his mother instead of his father's ordinary family. In 1938, Wyn found a gig managing the Guggenheim Jeune for Peggy Guggenheim; a collector of modern art.

Henderson studied biology at Chelsea Polytechnic in London from 1935 to 1936. He worked as an assistant to Helmut Ruhemann from 1936 to 1939. In the late 1930s Henderson developed paintings inspired by Yves Tanguy. Through his mother's ties, Henderson met artists of the avant-garde such as Max Ernst and Marcel Duchamp. In 1938, Henderson exhibited two collages at the Guggenheim Jeune alongside artists such as Ernst, Braque, Picasso, Schwitters and Gris.

== War and personal life ==
Henderson put his passion for art aside to join the war effort as a pilot in Coastal Command. In 1943 he married (Karin) Judith Stephen (1918 - 1972); an anthropologist who introduced him to life on working class streets (daughter of psychoanalysts Adrian Stephen and Karin Costelloe and niece of writer Virginia Woolf). They had four children. During this period Henderson took various photographs of street life and began to compile documentaries. He also continued to experiment with collages and the physicality of photography.

== Career ==
After the war, he studied at the Slade School of Fine Art in London. At Slade he befriended Eduardo Paolozzi and William Turnbull. He and Paolozzi travelled to Paris and met other artists such as Brancusi, Léger, Giacometti, and Braque. After leaving Slade Henderson fell back in love with photography. While living in Bethnal Green between 1949 and 1952, he took numerous documentary photographs of the area. He achieved abnormal effects by using various techniques such as altering negatives and placing images on light-sensitive paper to create Photograms.

In the early 1950s he was a member of the Independent Group and taught at the Central School of Art with Anthony Froshaug, Edward Wright and Eduardo Paolozzi. With Paolozzi and others he participated in the Parallel of Life and Art exhibition at the ICA in London. He took part in the exhibition This is Tomorrow at the Whitechapel Gallery in 1956. At This is Tomorrow, Henderson exhibited a large and disturbing image entitled "Head of Man." After performing his first major solo show at the ICA, he began colouring in some of his photographs with paint. One of his most famous coloured photographs is "Plant Tantrums."

From 1965 to 1968 and from 1972 to 1982 he headed the photography department at Norwich School of Art while working on independent projects. Henderson produced most of his work in series connected by a single visceral image. One of his series named "Face at the Window" focused on the image of a bandaged face which Henderson found on a cigarette card. He followed with two other series entitled Head in Blocks, and Single Heads, in which he created various versions of self-portraits.

In 1954 he moved with his family to the village of Thorpe-le-Soken in Essex. The Hendersons were joined by the Paolozzis, who owned joint cottages that neighboured theirs. With Paolozzi, Henderson established Hammer Prints Limited, a design company producing wallpapers, textiles and ceramics that were initially manufactured at Landermere Wharf. Henderson's company did not hinder his collaboration with others from the Independent Group. Colin St John Wilson, a long-time member of the Independent Group, invited Henderson to form a solo exhibition at the School of Architecture in Cambridge. Wilson also donated a collage screen started by Henderson in 1949 to the Pallant House Gallery in 2004. Nigel Henderson's work was included in the 1990 Institute of Contemporary Arts exhibition, The Independent Group: Postwar Britain and the Aesthetics of Plenty.

From 6 August to 4 September 1983, the exhibition 'Heads eye Wyn' of Dada-influenced photomontage images of his own head, an obsessive theme in his later work was presented in The Minories, Colchester. In 2013, A tour of Firstsite exhibition 'Nigel Henderson and Eduardo Paolozzi: Hammer Prints Ltd 1954–1975' was held and followed by tea and cakes at The Minories Cafe. In addition, The Eastern Pavilions Print Portfolio which can currently be viewed at The Minories, Colchester includes Nigel Henderson's photograph 'Wall Painting. Stopping Out. Grove Road. Bethnal Green' (1949–53).

== Release of images in 2015 ==
In June 2012 the Nigel Henderson Estate appointed Tate Images as the copyright agent for all permissions clearance and in April 2015 the Tate made available over 3,000 photographs by Nigel Henderson. The photographs were taken during 1949-1956 and cover two aspects of his life, his time in the East End, especially around Bethnal Green, and his interest in the 1950s London Soho jazz scene. The photographs of the East End are of a documentary nature showing life on the street; children playing, street vendors, market stalls, high streets, buildings and the street parties around the 1953 Coronation of Queen Elizabeth II. The photographs of Soho's jazz scene include candid images of Tony Crombie, Ronnie Scott, Lennie Bush and Jack Parnell.
