= Chipping Barnet War Memorial =

War memorial in London

Coordinates: 51°39′12″N 0°12′05″W

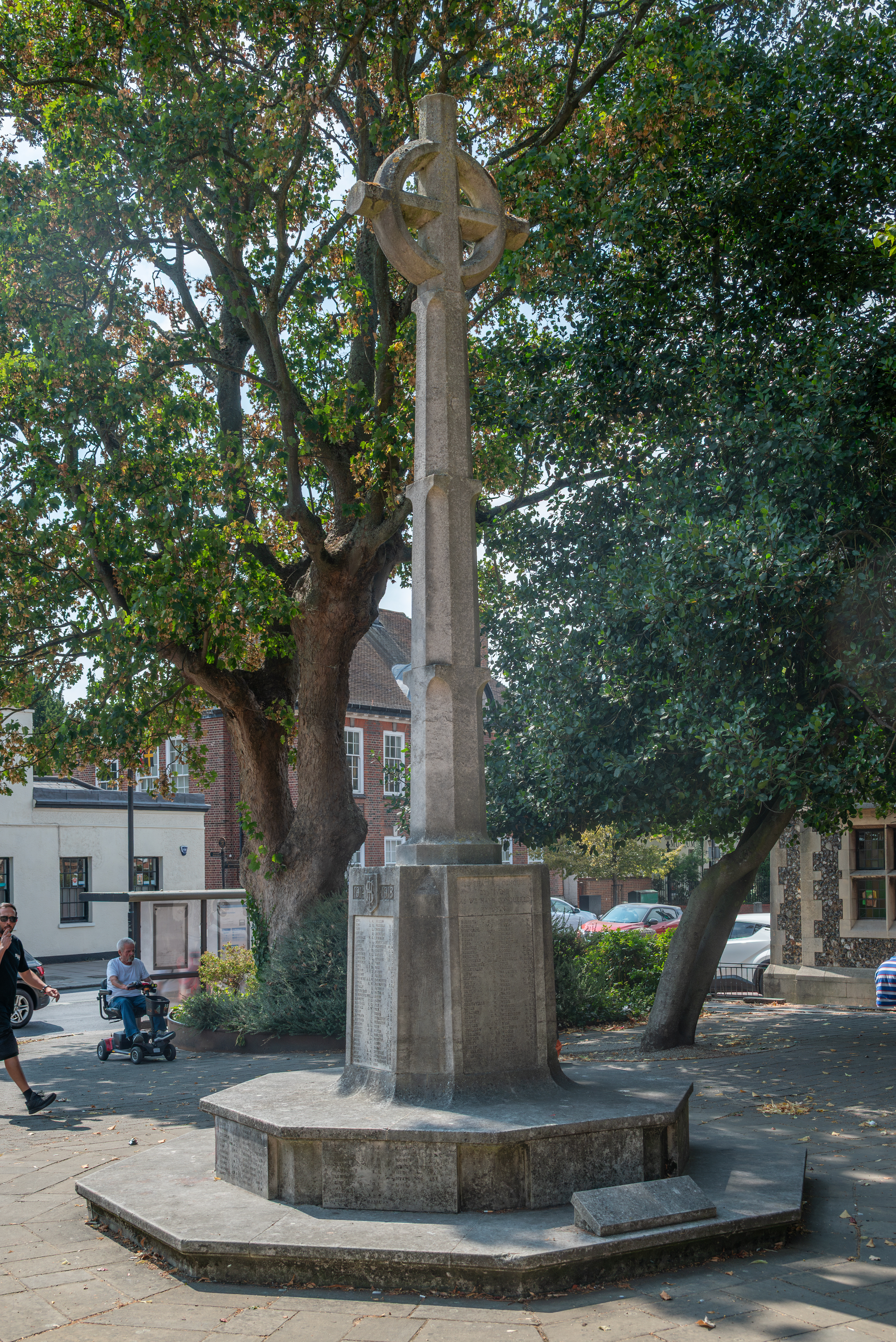
Chipping Barnet War Memorial

The Chipping Barnet War Memorial is located immediately west of St John the Baptist Church in Wood Street, Chipping Barnet, Greater London. It commemorates the men and women of the district who died in the first and second World Wars and is in the form of an octagonal base below a pedestal surmounted by a tapering column with a Celtic cross head. The cross is intersected by a corona in a flattened octagonal section. It was unveiled by Lord Byng of Vimy in April 1921. Byng was born at nearby Wrotham Park in Hertfordshire.
