= Beaumont Cut =

Coordinates: 51°52′17″N 1°10′46″E

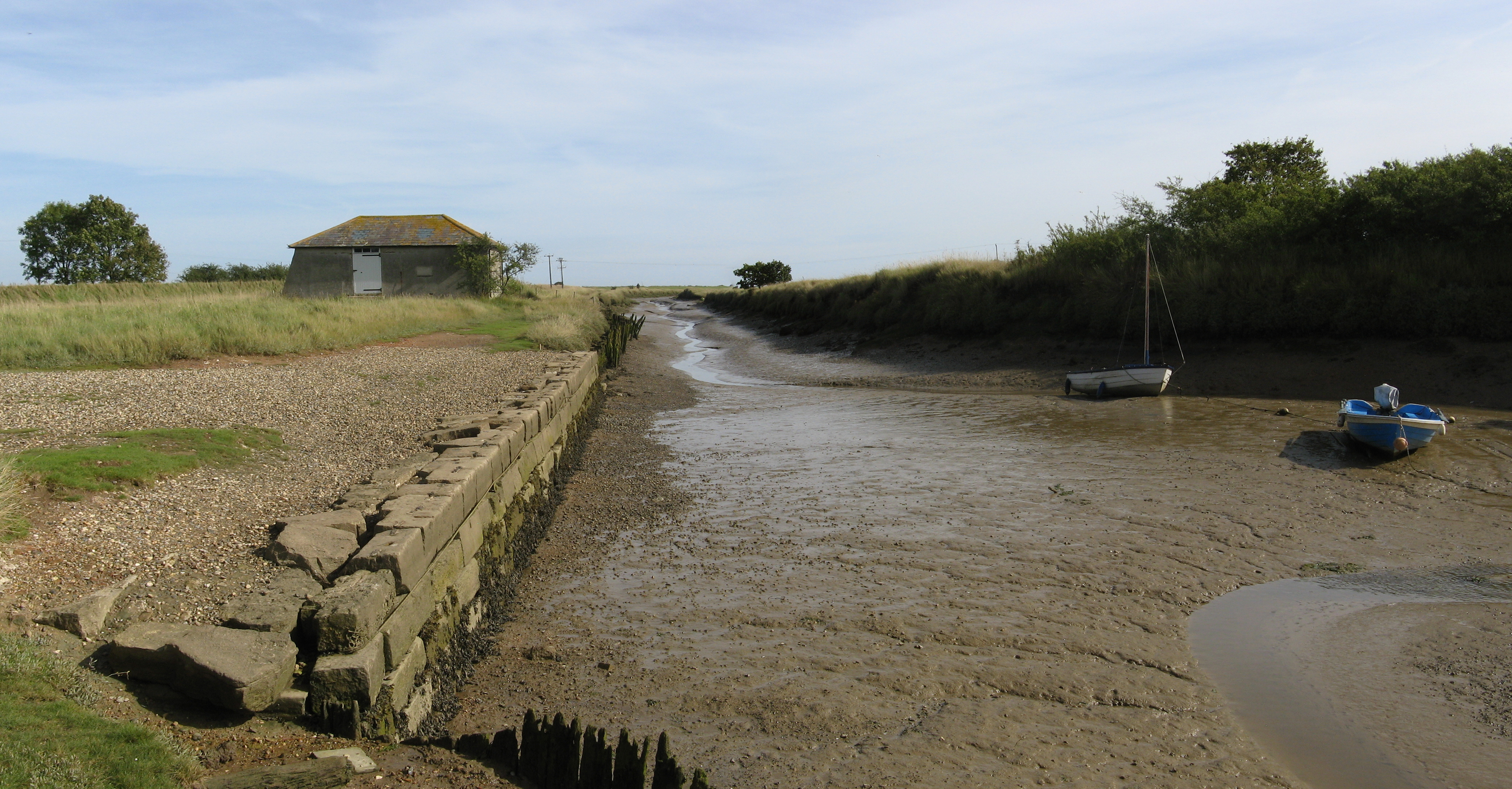
Beaumont Quay and Cut at low tide

Beaumont Cut was a 1-kilometre-long (1,090 yd) canal linking Beaumont Quay, in the parish of Beaumont-cum-Moze, Tendring, Essex, England, with Hamford Water and the North Sea. It was opened in 1832 but fell into disuse and was closed at some time in the 1930s.

== History ==
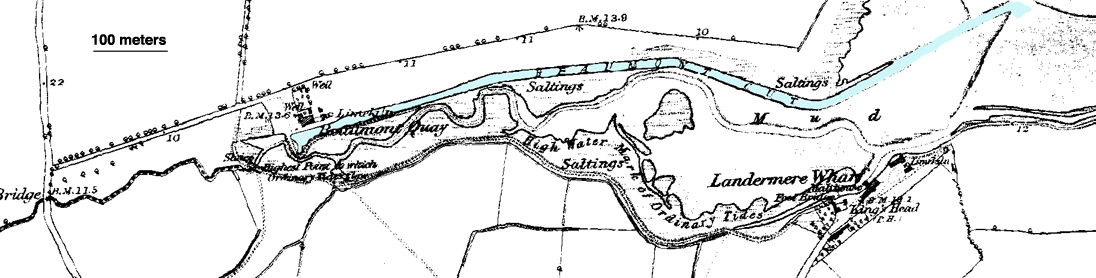
Beaumont Cut, from Beaumont Quay past Landermere Wharf to Hamford Water, in 1880

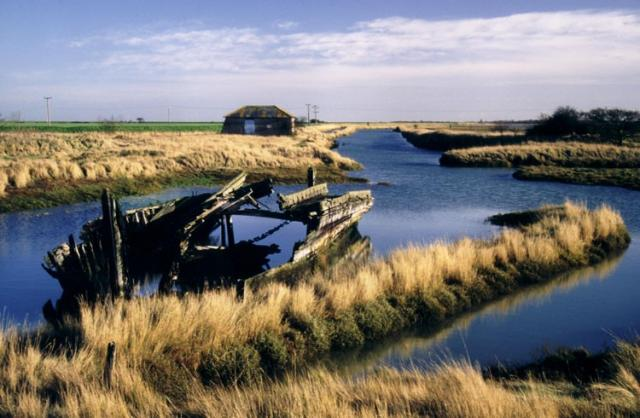
The quay and warehouse at the inland end of the canal in 2002, before restoration. The wreck is the Rose, a 42-ton coastal barge of 1880

Archaeological studies suggest that the first canal on the site was built by the Romans, possibly in connection with salt extraction in the area; Roman-era pottery sherds have been found and sites of salterns identified. The nineteenth-century canal was constructed to serve the extensive coastal traffic between the agricultural hinterland of Essex and London, with produce and animal fodder being carried into the capital and manure for the fields as cargo for the return trip. The proprietors of the venture were the governors of Guy’s Hospital, who owned agricultural estates in the area. They were granted supplies of stone from Old London Bridge (demolished in 1831) for the purpose. Two vessels, the Thames barges Beaumont Belle and The Gleaner, both owned by the tenant of one of the estates, were initially based on the canal, but general trade was accepted.

Beaumont Quay features in the 1939 novel Secret Water by Arthur Ransome.

== Surviving structures ==
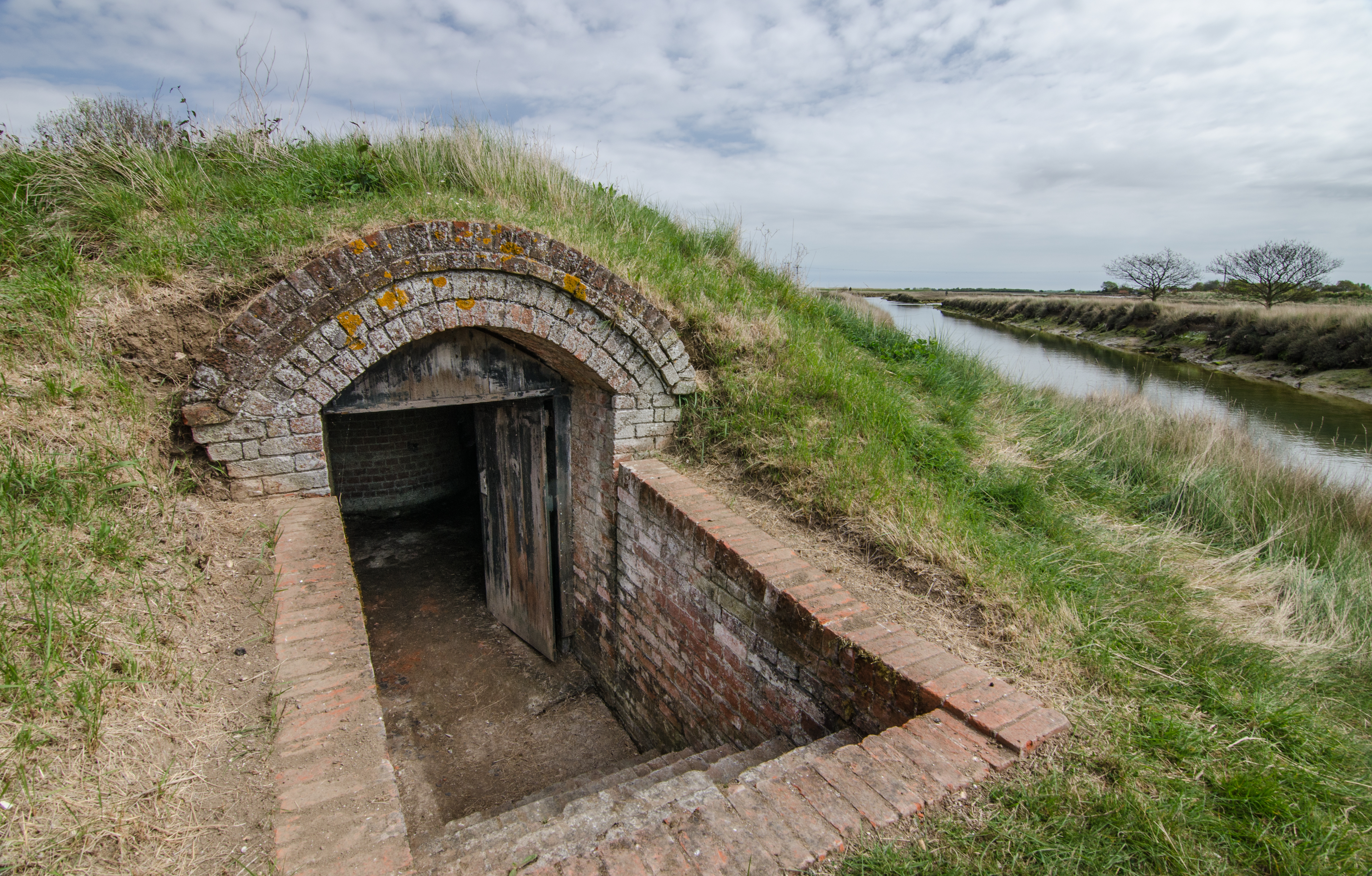
19th century lime kiln

The line of the canal remains watered and is easily traceable. The quay at the western end of the canal – together with a disused barn and a lime kiln – was made a scheduled ancient monument and is now under the care of the parks department of Essex County Council.
