= György Beifeld =

Hungarian writer

György Beifeld (later George Byfield) (ca. 1902–1982) was a Hungarian Jew best known for writing a richly illustrated memoir while spending more than a year at the eastern front in 1942–1943 as a member of a forced-labor battalion.

György Beifeld was a 40-year-old Hungarian Jew in 1942. He lived in Budapest, where he was trained as a lawyer, but earned his living as a stockbroker. He was also a talented artist who loved to draw and paint in his spare time. In the spring of 1942, Beifeld was one of 50,000 Jewish men who were deployed in the Hungarian Labor Service (Munkaszolgálat) in the Soviet Union to support Hungarian troops sent to the eastern front to help the Axis to conquer the Soviet Union.

== In the labor service ==
Living conditions were abysmal in the labor service, and the Jewish conscripts were often brutally mistreated by their officers and guards. The abuses against them included withholding or stealing their meager rations, denying them adequate clothing or footwear to perform their duties, quartering them for long periods outside without shelter, and dousing them with water and leaving them to freeze in the bitter cold of the Russian winter. During the retreat of the Hungarian army and its auxiliary labor units in the winter of 1943 after their defeat by the Soviets, Hungarian soldiers often plundered and even killed many of the Jewish labor servicemen. In all, more than 40,000 Jewish labor servicemen lost their lives.

Beifeld was inducted into the 109/13 labor company in April 1942. The Jewish conscript took with him an ample supply of paper, paint, and pencils to keep him occupied in whatever spare time he could find. As it turned out, not only did these art supplies give him something to do in that spare time, they actually helped to spare his life during his year in the Soviet Union.

Beifeld began painting immediately after his induction, creating watercolors of the base camp in Hungary where the company was initially stationed. On 20 April 1942, Beifeld's company departed by train for the Russian front. Just before their departure the members of the company received a superficial medical checkup and readiness review. As Beifeld writes in his memoir,

On April 19, Lieutenant Colonel Domonkos, Commander of the Replacement Center, reviewed the Company's readiness to march. The only things he was concerned about were the yellow armbands [the Jewish labor serviceman's only uniform] and the dog tags. Were the yellow armbands properly sewn to the jackets and overcoats, and did we have dog tags around our necks? Apart from that, he was concerned only with the horses. He looked at us with deep disgust. Later it came to our attention that he said goodbye to Banovich [the company commander] with the hope that not a single Jew would be among those whom he would bring back home

Beifeld's company arrived at Orel in Russia on 26 April. He describes the countryside as seen from the train, noting not only the absence of young men, but also the absence of dogs, which increasingly had been used as a source of food in this time of privation.

From Orel members of the company marched on foot for several days to their first destination, a construction site on the Orel-Kursk highway. Their task was to do maintenance work on the roadway. Beifeld describes the work as arduous and unproductive, and no sooner had they completed one task, they would receive another order to do just the opposite. Fortunately for Beifeld, after only 4–5 days of this hard labor his commander issued an order for the creation of a company diary, and Beifeld was asked to provide the illustrations. As a result, he was exempt for a time from construction work.

Drawing and painting turned out to be a lucrative business for Beifeld. His portraits, landscapes, and caricatures became sought-after commodities, and many of the soldiers were ready to barter food or cigarettes for his pictures.

During the summer of 1942, the company was sent on long marches that took them close to the front line. Their duties included building fortifications, transporting ammunition, constructing bridges and roads, laying mines, burying the dead, and carrying away the wounded. As the summer progressed the heat intensified, their rations were cut back, and their treatment deteriorated. The company was repeatedly the target of raids by the military police, who confiscated their meager personal belongings, including soap and cigarettes, which left them with nothing to barter for extra food.

The conscripts hung on in the hopes of being demobilized at the end of the summer. Instead, they were sent back to the front line in September. In the course of their work many labor servicemen, including Beifeld, suffered shrapnel wounds. When his wound became seriously infected Beifeld was sent to a field hospital in Plotawa, 15–20 km behind the front line. There, he became friendly with the chief physician, Dr. Bela Balta.

== Counteroffensive and retreat ==
The entire medical staff in the field hospital treated Beifeld with extraordinary care and respect and allowed him to remain for the full term of his convalescence. As soon as his hand began to improve, Beifeld started to draw and paint pictures of the hospital and its staff. Subsequently, he was entrusted with preparing the architectural drawings for a new field hospital. To forestall being sent back to his unit, Beifeld tried to make himself indispensable by taking up additional duties such as answering the phone, typing, and helping to transport the wounded.

In his spare time, Beifeld wrote about the tough conditions faced by his labor battalion comrades during the Russian winter. Nearly half of his company's original 200 conscripts had either perished or were taken out of action with frostbite, malnutrition, and other ailments.

On 13 January 1943, the new commander of the Soviet Army of the Don, General Georgy Zhukov, began a surprise counteroffensive that resulted in the destruction of the majority of the Second Hungarian Army and the retreat of the remainder to Kiev. Beifeld wrote pages of detailed and graphic descriptions of the chaotic evacuation in the snow under the bombardment of Russian planes. In one poignant description, he writes:

We started our Napoleonic-style retreat [which lasted from January 13 to March 6] in snow that was 70 centimeters deep, in temperatures that reached minus 46°C. Running night after night in deep snow...Stumbling, sneaking, sliding, holding on to the sled with both hands until they became stiff…This is how one imagines a typical picture of retreat. Cars, horse-drawn wagons carrying ammunition, tanks, small engines pulling cannons, yokes of oxen, Russian sleds, total confusion… The wind was blowing icicles into our eyes. Our breath got frozen to the fabric we used to cover our faces. One's legs were in great pain dragging the body…Anyone who got exhausted and sat down for a minute would inevitably freeze to death. That applied equally to men and horses. They lay there next to each other frozen to death, a soldier, a horse, and a Jew.

Despite all their suffering heretofore, the worst period for the Jewish conscripts in the Hungarian labor service came after their arrival in Kiev. There, they met up with the regular forces of the Hungarian army of occupation in the Ukraine, who ruthlessly persecuted them in their attempt to replenish their supply of war booty, which they had lost during the retreat.

Beifeld managed to remain under the protection of Dr. Balta until the first week in April, when he was sent towards the Jewish reception camps dressed in a Hungarian military uniform with well-stocked bread bags and a laissez passer. He narrowly escaped capture by the military police, and looting and beatings at a collection center for Jewish conscripts in Pogoreloye. Eventually Beifeld met up with the remnants of his original company in a village called Vidinye. From here, he and his comrades were taken to another camp, where there was almost no food or water and where they were greeted with blows from the guards. Beifeld managed to maintain his health thanks to the assistance of a Hungarian first lieutenant, who gave him food every day in exchange for a couple of watercolors. This situation lasted for about three weeks, until 23 May, when a Hungarian general, after visiting the labor service personnel, ordered their evacuation. Within days the survivors, including Beifeld, were sent home by train.

Knowing that his pictures had saved his life, Beifeld refused to abandon his artistic oeuvre during the long retreat, even though his comrades jettisoned or bartered everything they had in order to survive.

== Postwar assembling of the Beifeld album ==
Beifeld did not have long to recuperate after his return to Budapest before the situation of Hungarian Jews took a dramatic turn for the worse. In March 1944, Germany occupied Hungary, and within weeks, the ghettoization and deportation of the Jewish community commenced. While a precise chronology of what happened to Beifeld in 1944 is not available, it is known that he was deported to a concentration camp (probably in the fall of that year) and was ultimately liberated in Dachau.

Beifeld most likely assembled this album of original drawings and narrative text in the period between his return to Budapest in 1945 and his emigration to Australia either in 1948 or 1956. All but a few of the 400 images, which are carefully labeled as based on sketches drawn in situ, appear to have been created at the time of his labor service in the Soviet Union, and the text is based on notes he made at the time. Some of the drawings were made on the backs of military postcards that were mailed to friends and retrieved afterwards.

Following his move to Australia, Beifeld changed his name to George Byfield and opened a tobacconist shop. Later he established a studio of interior design, which became quite successful. Beifeld died in Australia in 1982 at the age of 80. Due to a fluke, the album came to the notice and into the possession of an Australian historian, Ann Major, in 1999. Thanks to her tireless efforts (scanning most of the pictures and compiling an English summary of the text), the album was eventually sent to Washington. It was another couple of years before the various beneficiaries of Beifeld's will came together to approve of the album's final home at the United States Holocaust Memorial Museum.

== Humor in the Beifeld Album ==
The uniqueness of the Beifeld album lies not only in its richness of illustration and detail of description, but in the charm of its author's sense of humor, which is displayed on nearly every page. Beifeld found himself caught in the bitterly ironic situation of being a Jewish conscript in one antisemitic army (Hungary) fighting against another antisemitic regime (Stalinist Russia) at the behest of a third, genocidal power (Nazi Germany). To cope with the awful absurdity of his situation, Beifeld resorted to a biting, sardonic form of literary and artistic expression. The humor is expressed through tongue in cheek descriptions, double entendres, sarcastic anecdotes and shocking juxtapositions in his drawings and collages.

== Notes ==
This article incorporates text from the United States Holocaust Memorial Museum, and has been released under the GFDL.
