= Evelyn Byng, Viscountess Byng of Vimy =

Canadian politician (1870–1949)

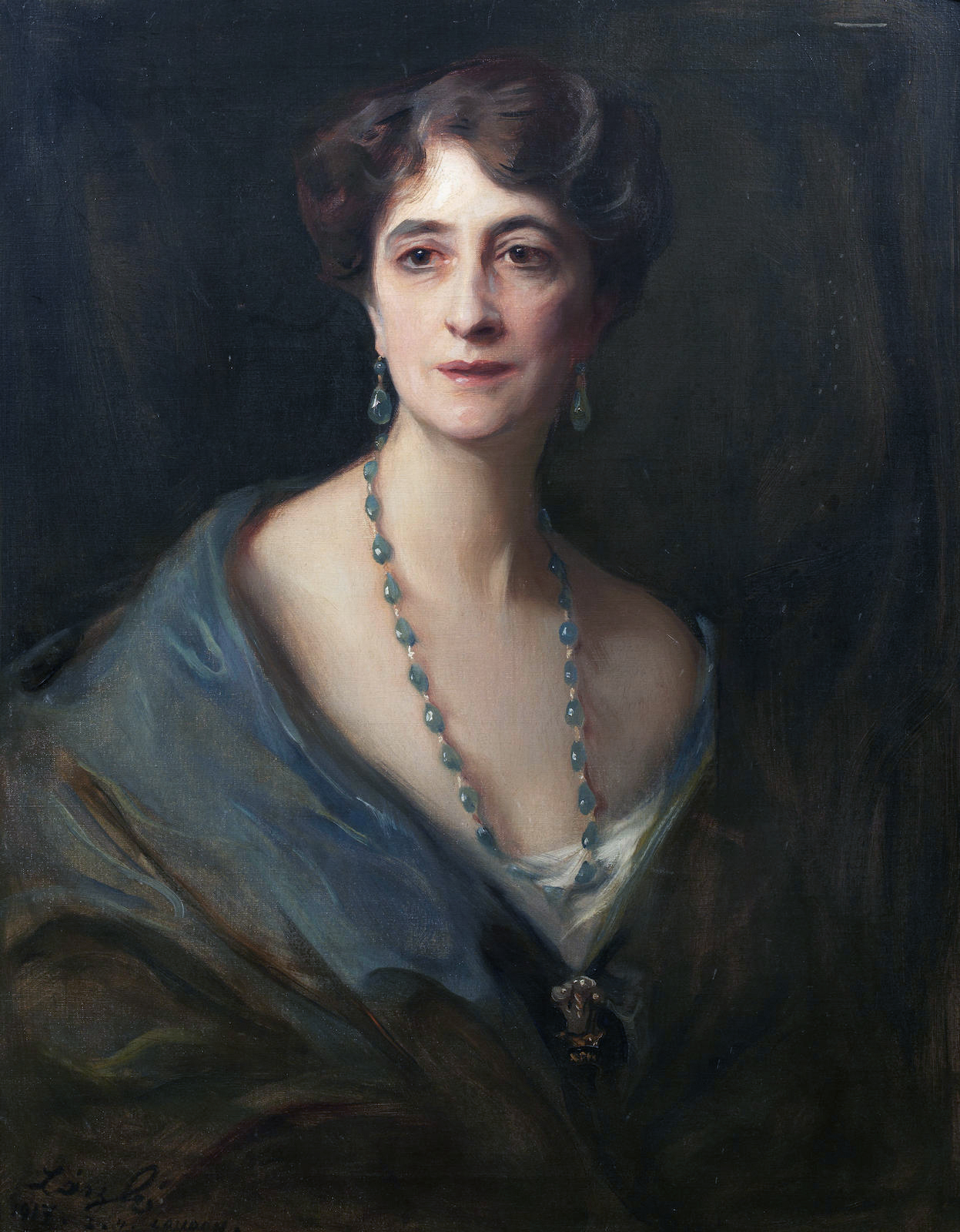
Lady Byng, née Marie Evelyn Moreton (Philip Alexius de László, 1917)

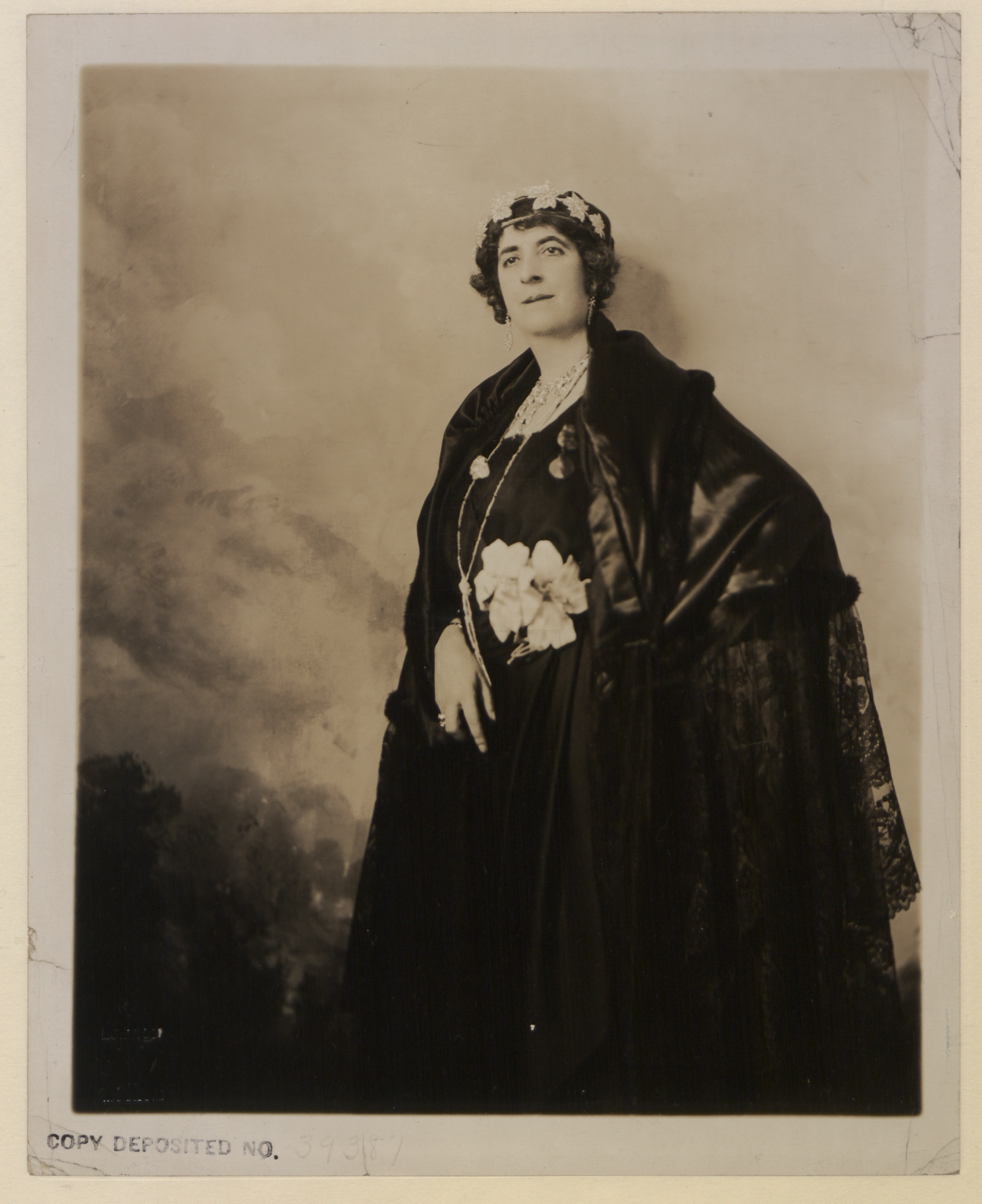
Lady Byng, photographed in 1921

Marie Evelyn Byng, Viscountess Byng of Vimy (née Moreton; 11 January 1870 – 20 June 1949), also known as Lady Byng, was the wife of Lord Byng, the 12th Governor General of Canada (1921–26).

== Biography ==
Born as Marie Evelyn Moreton in London in 1870, she was the daughter of the Hon. Sir Richard Charles Reynolds-Moreton and Janie Ralli. Her father was comptroller at Rideau Hall during the term of Marquess of Lorne.

She married, at St Paul's Church, Knightsbridge, on 30 April 1902, Colonel the Hon. Julian Byng, youngest son of the 2nd Earl of Strafford. They lived in India before the outbreak of WWI, and moved to Canada on his appointment as Governor-General in 1921. He was created Baron Byng of Vimy in 1919, for his service during the war, and Viscount Byng of Vimy in 1928, after his service in Canada. They had no children.

Lady Byng is best known today for donating the Lady Byng Trophy to the NHL in 1925. She and her husband were both keen sports fans, especially of ice hockey, and they attended many Ottawa Senators games. They donated the trophy because Lady Byng appreciated gentlemanly play and good sportsmanship and wanted to encourage and reward it. At the end of his term as Governor General, Lord and Lady Byng returned to Thorpe Hall, their home in Essex, England. They continued to travel together, visiting friends in South Africa, Jamaica, California and Canada, until Lord Byng's death in 1935.

With the outbreak of war in 1939, the area around her home became vulnerable to enemy attacks, and the Home Secretary, Sir John Anderson, urged her to evacuate to Canada for the duration. She remained in Canada from 1940 to the end of the war, visiting western Canada before making her temporary home in Ottawa. While there, she wrote her memoirs, Up The Stream of Time. She also worked at volunteer jobs, including a local thrift shop to raise funds for the Red Cross and The Women's Active Service Club, a haven for non-commissioned women in all three services branches.

Lady Byng died on 20 June 1949, aged 79, at Thorpe Hall, in Essex, England.

== Legacy ==
A 2/4 march for bagpipes was composed in her honour.

Honorary titles
Preceded by The Duchess of Devonshire	Viceregal Consort of Canada; 1921–1926	Succeeded by The Marchioness of Willingdon
