= Thorpe Hall (Thorpe-le-Soken) =

Manor house in Thorpe-le-Soken, Essex, England

Coordinates: 51.8522°N 1.1686°E

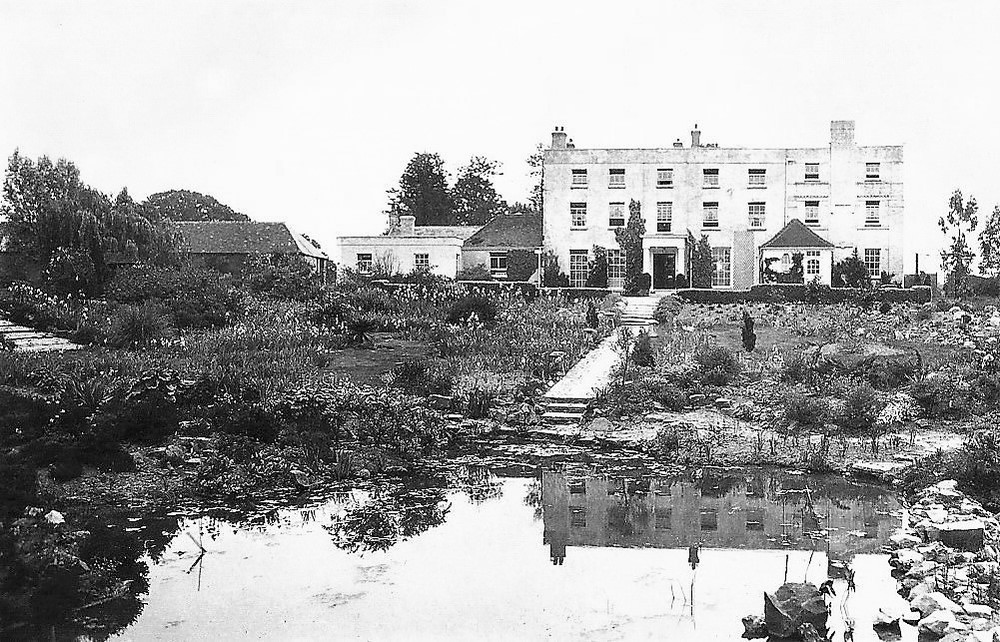
Thorpe Hall and gardens, Thorpe-le-Soken, Essex: the home of Lord and Lady Byng

Thorpe Hall was a manor house built in the Georgian style at Thorpe-le-Soken in Essex, England.

== History ==
The Thorpe Manor estate belonged to the Dean and Chapter of St Paul's until the Dissolution of the Monasteries. In 1723 it was bought by Stephen Martin who assumed the name and arms of Leake upon inheriting an estate from Admiral Sir John Leake; it remained in the Leake family – the most recent manor house was built between 1822 and 1825 for John Martin Leake – until 1913 when it was bought by Julian Byng, 1st Viscount Byng of Vimy whose wife, Evelyn Byng, Viscountess Byng of Vimy, laid out the gardens. Viscount Byng died at Thorpe Hall in 1935.

It was acquired by the Ministry of Defence at the start of World War II and then became the Lady Nelson Convalescent Home for employees of English Electric in 1951.

It was sold to the Ryan Group in 1988 and to Tangram Leisure in 2000. Tangram Leisure demolished the manor and replaced it with a residential spa which was completed in December 2010. Tangram Leisure went into administration in 2012.
