= Thorpe-le-Soken =

Village in Essex, England

Coordinates: 51.857°N 1.164°E

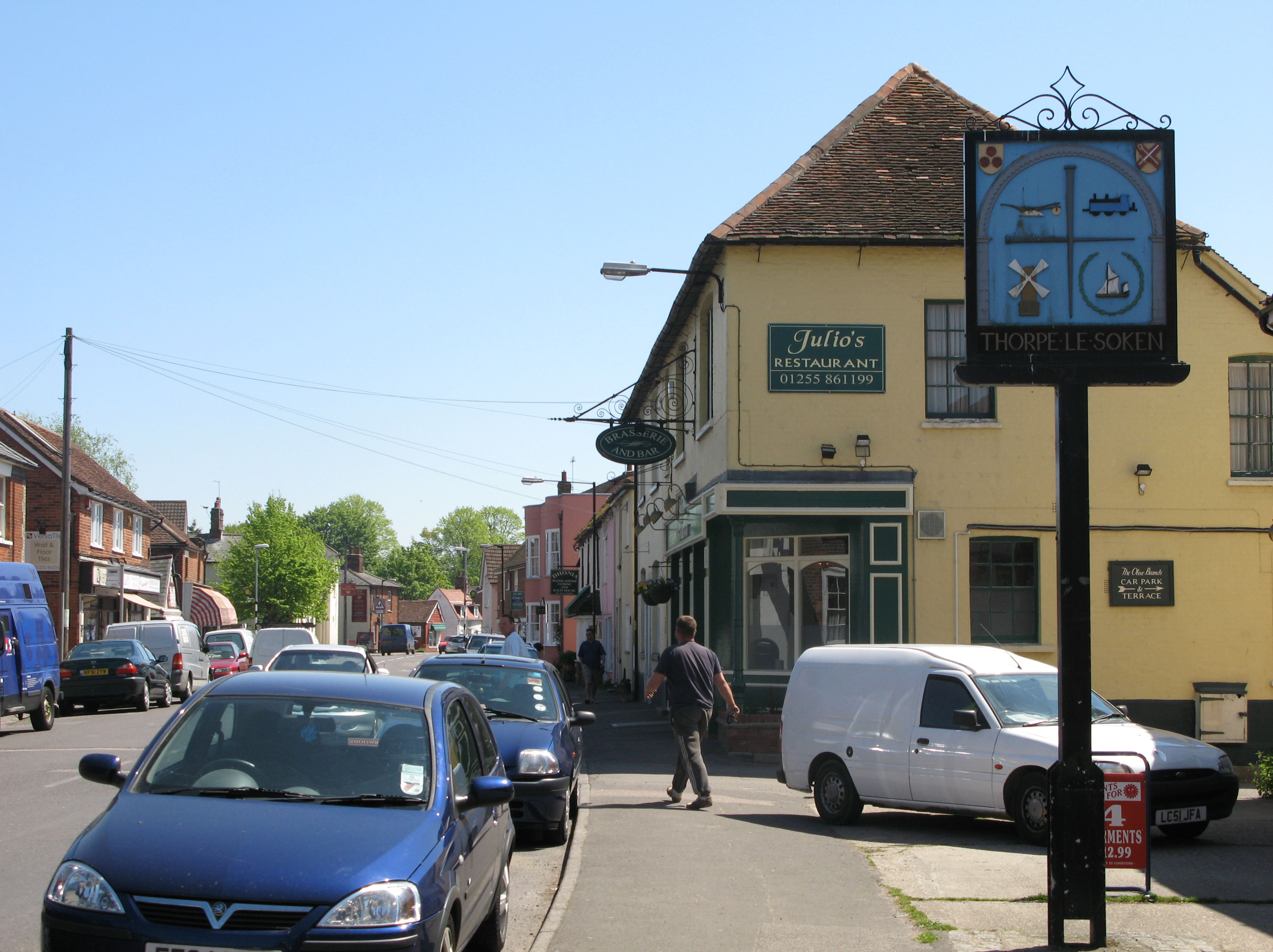

- Location within Essex
- Population: 2,273 (Parish, 2021)
- OS grid reference: TM178223
- District: Tendring
- Shire county: Essex
- Region: East
- Country: England
- Sovereign state: United Kingdom
- Post town: CLACTON-ON-SEA
- Postcode district: CO16
- Dialling code: 01255
- Police: Essex
- Fire: Essex
- Ambulance: East of England
- UK Parliament: Clacton

Thorpe-le-Soken is a village and civil parish in the Tendring district of Essex, England. It is located east of Colchester, west of Walton-on-the-Naze and Frinton-on-Sea, and north of Clacton-on-Sea. At the 2021 census the parish had a population of 2,273.

== History ==
Since 2002, archaeological investigations ahead of construction work have uncovered traces of Palaeolithic (early Clactonian 424,000-400,000 BC), Mesolithic, early Neolithic and Roman rural settlements. Thorpe-le-Soken's contiguous history can be traced back to Saxon times. In c. 970, King Æthelstan confirmed the grant of Eduluesnaesa – combined estate of Kirby, Thorpe and Walton – to St Paul’s. Soken meaning a jurisdiction with separate taxation and managerial responsibilities.

There has been a manor house at Thorpe since about 1150. The old manor house, Thorpe Hall, was owned by the Leake family, and rebuilt in the 1820s by the wealthy lawyer J.M. Leake (d. 1862). It was later leased by Frederic Foaker, owner of Sneating Hall at Kirby-le-Soken. Thorpe Hall was the home of Viscount Byng of Vimy (Governor General of Canada 1921–6), and his wife Evelyn Byng, Viscountess Byng of Vimy, who relandscaped the gardens.

Between 1690 and 1720 Thorpe housed a community of several dozen Huguenot refugees fleeing persecution in France, who are thought to have stayed at the large house still called Comarques. The house is now home to the Adams family. (Source: Huguenot Society records.) This was also the home of the famous Midlands author Arnold Bennett just before and during the First World War. (Source: contemporary issues of Essex County Standard, Arnold Bennett's Correspondence.)

The local church, St Michael's, was shown in series 2 episode 4 of the BBC's Who Do You Think You Are?, where comedian Julian Clary traced a family member to the church.

== Facilities ==
Thorpe-le-Soken has Rolph CofE Primary School in the High Street, and the Thorpe Campus of Tendring Technology College (Years 7, 8 and 9) in Landermere Road. The village is served by Thorpe-le-Soken railway station. The village had a post office at 29 High Street, but this closed c. 2008 and was converted into a house. The village hosts several shops, pubs and eateries.

== Notable residents ==
- Field Marshal Lord Byng of Vimy GCB GCMG MVO (1862–1935), an officer who served with distinction during World War I and as Governor General of Canada, lived in Thorpe-le-Soken during his retirement and died at the now demolished Thorpe Hall. He is buried at the 11th-century parish church of St. Leonard's in Beaumont-cum-Moze.
- Sir William Gull (1816 – 1890), Royal physician, and suggested as a suspect in the Jack the Ripper murders, is buried in St Michael's churchyard.
- Arnold Bennett (1867 – 1931), novelist and playwright
- Nigel Henderson (artist) (1 April 1917 – 15 May 1985), artist and photographer.
- Sir Eduardo Luigi Paolozzi (7 March 1924 – 22 April 2005), sculptor and artist
