= Beaumont =

Beaumont may refer to:

== People ==
- Beaumont (surname), including a list of people with the name
- Beaumont (given name), including a list of people with the name
- House of Beaumont, an Anglo-Norman baronial family in England
- Duc de Beaumont, an extinct French title
- Viscount Beaumont of Swords, an extinct title in the Peerage of Ireland
- Baron Beaumont, a title in the Peerage of England
- Beaumont baronets, titles in the Baronetage of England

== Places ==
=== Australia ===
- Beaumont, New South Wales
- Beaumont, South Australia, a suburb of Adelaide
- Beaumont, Western Australia

=== Canada ===
- Beaumont, Alberta
- Beaumont, Quebec

=== France ===
- Beaumont, Ardèche
- Beaumont, Corrèze
- Beaumont, Gers
- Beaumont, Haute-Loire
- Beaumont, Meurthe-et-Moselle
- Beaumont, Puy-de-Dôme
- Beaumont, Haute-Savoie
- Beaumont, Vienne
- Beaumont, Yonne
- Beaumont-en-Diois

=== United Kingdom ===
- Beaumont, Cumbria, England
- Beaumont-cum-Moze, Essex
  - Beaumont Cut, a closed canal

=== United States ===
- Beaumont, California
- Beaumont, Kansas
- Beaumont, Kentucky
- Beaumont, Mississippi
- Beaumont, Ohio
- Beaumont, Texas
  - Beaumont station
  - Beaumont Commercial District
- Beaumont, Virginia
- Beaumont, Wisconsin

=== Elsewhere ===
- Beaumont, Belgium
- Beaumont, Haiti
  - Beaumont City
- Beaumont, Dublin, Ireland
- Beaumont, New Zealand
- Beaumont Island, Antarctica
- Beaumont Island (Greenland)
- Beaumont River, New Zealand
- Beaumont (crater), a lunar crater

== Schools ==
- Beaumont College, a former Catholic school in Old Windsor, Berkshire, England
- Beaumont School, St Albans, Hertfordshire, England
- Beaumont School (Ohio), U.S.
- Beaumont High School (disambiguation), several uses

== Other uses ==
- Beaumont (automobile), by General Motors of Canada 1964–1969
- Beaumont (Michaux, Virginia), U.S., a historic house
- Beaumont, a British band of Keith Girdler and Paul Stewart from Blueboy
- "Beaumont", a song by 3OH!3 from the 2010 album Streets of Gold

== See also ==
- Beaumont Hospital (disambiguation)
- Beaumont Hotel (disambiguation)
- Beaumont House, Beaumont, Australia
- Beaumont House, Sydney, Australia
- Beaumont Palace, Oxford, England
- Beaumont Park (disambiguation)
- Beaumont Scout Reservation, High Ridge, Missouri, U.S.
- Beaumont Street, Oxford, England
- Beaumont Tower, East Lansing, Michigan, U.S., on the campus of Michigan State University
- Beaumonts (disambiguation)
- Beaumont's Halt railway station, Hertfordshire, England 1905–1963
- Beaumont-de-Lomagne, Tarn-et-Garonne, France
- Beaumont-du-Ventoux, Vaucluse, France
- Beaumont-en-Auge, Calvados, France
- Beaumont-en-Cambrésis, Nord, France
- Beaumont-Hague, in Manche, France
- Beaumont-Hamel, Somme, France
- Beaumont-le-Roger, Eure, France
- Beaumont-sur-Oise, Val-d'Oise, France
- Beaumont-sur-Sarthe, Sarthe, France
- Bomont, West Virginia, U.S.
- Battle of Beaumont (1870), Franco-Prussian War
- Battle of Beaumont (1794), French Revolutionary War
