= Bois d'Arc, Kansas =

Unincorporated community in Butler County, Kansas

- Unincorporated community
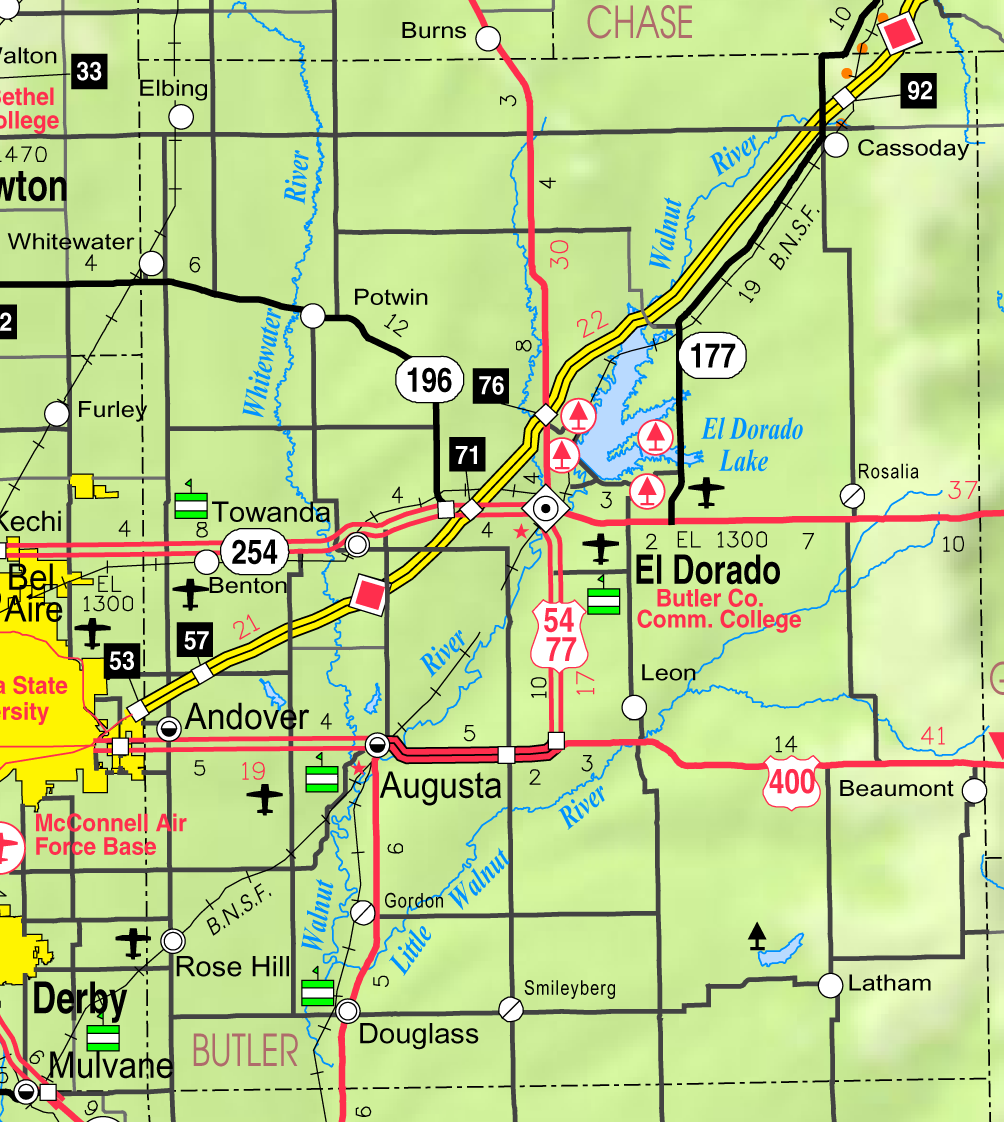
- KDOT map of Butler County (legend)

- Location within Kansas Location within the United States
- Coordinates: 37°35′47″N 96°55′31″W
- Country: United States
- State: Kansas
- County: Butler
- Township: Bloomington
- Elevation: 1,224 ft (373 m)
- Time zone: UTC-6 (CST)
  - Summer (DST): UTC-5 (CDT)
- Area code: 316
- FIPS code: 20-07860
- GNIS ID: 484710

Bois d'Arc /ˈboʊ.dɑːrk/ BOH-dark is an unincorporated community in Butler County, Kansas, United States. It is located about six miles southeast of Augusta in Bloomington Township.

== History ==
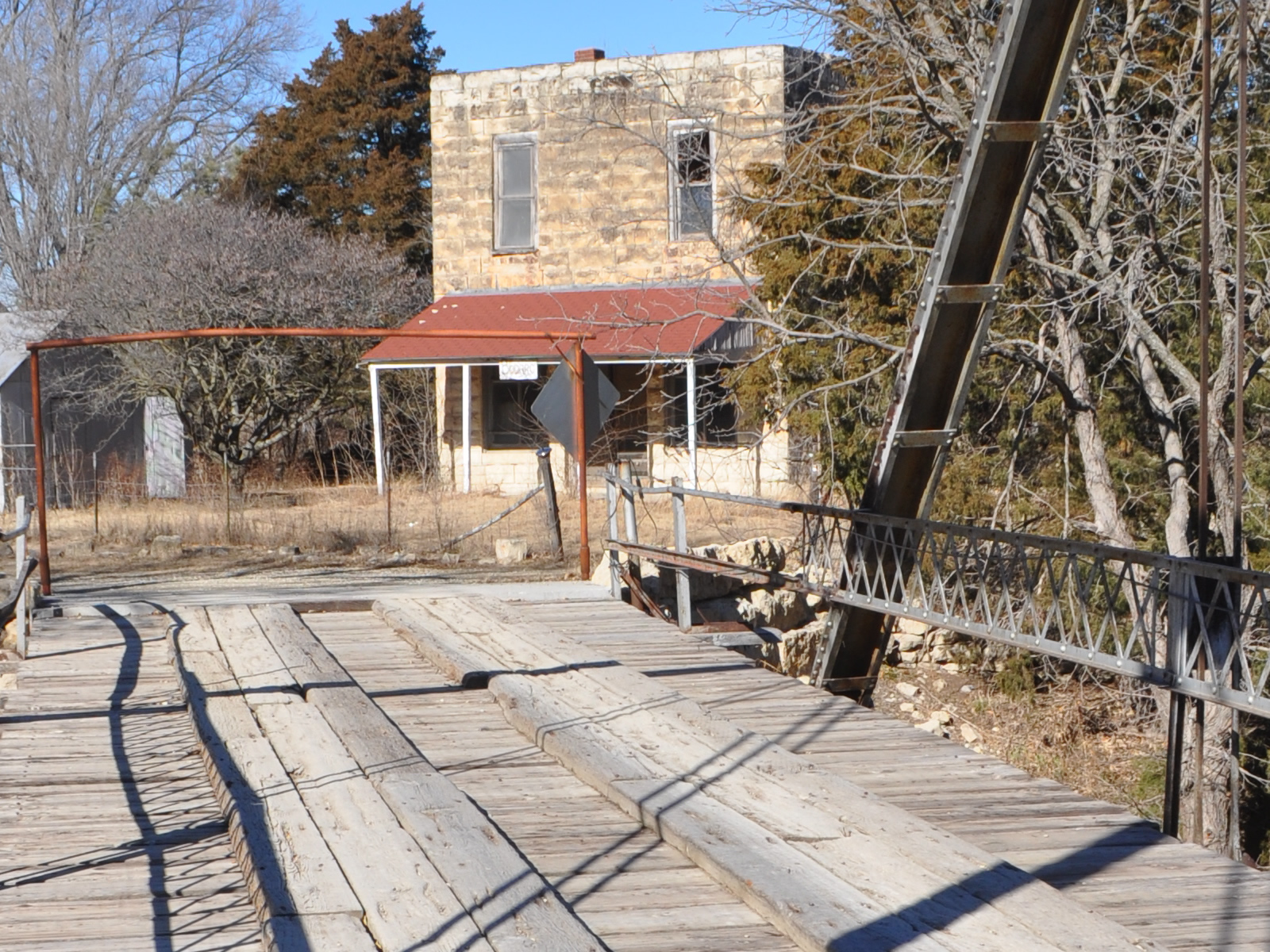
Former post office viewed from bridge (2013)

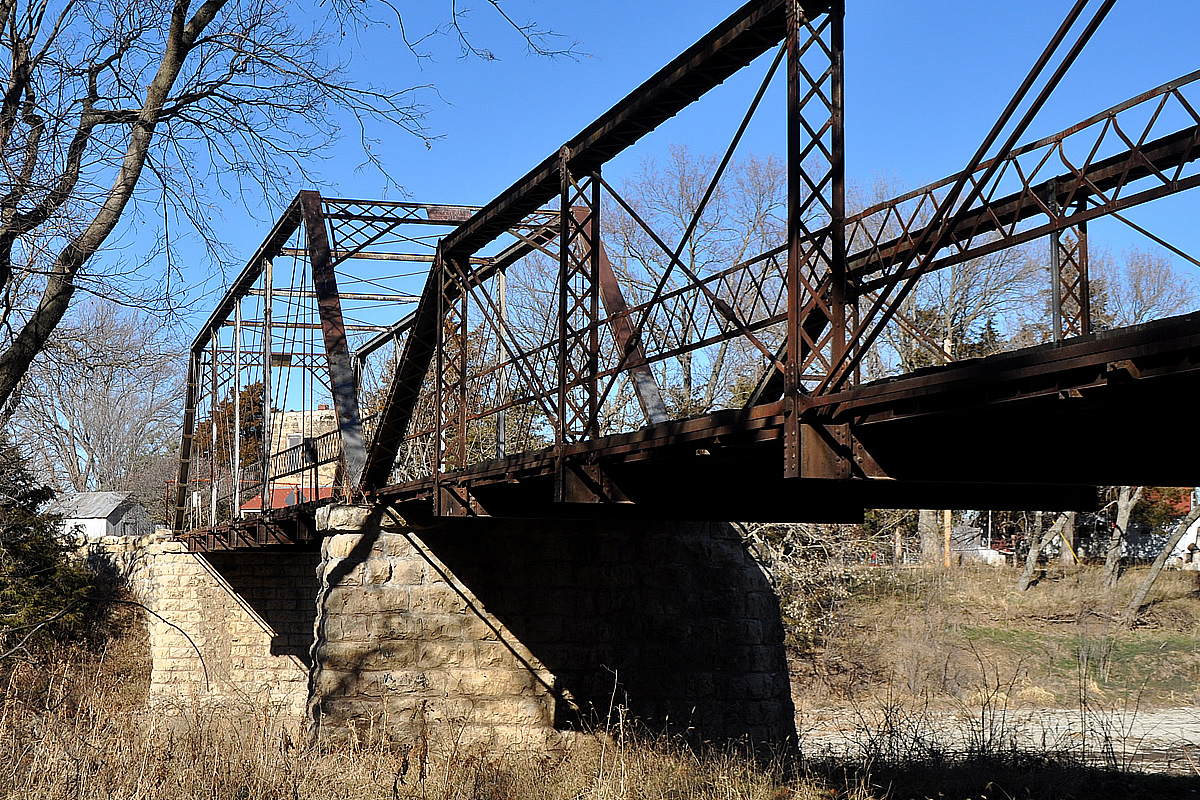
Bridge viewed from a dry Little Hickory Creek (2013)

The name Bois d'Arc is taken from one of the names for a common tree in the area, the Osage Orange tree. The Osage Indians used these trees to make their bows.

The post office was established December 21, 1892, and was discontinued March 31, 1904.

The nearby Little Walnut River Pratt Truss Bridge is on the National Register of Historic Places. According to the National Register of Historic Places registration form, the bridge crosses Little Walnut Creek, one mile below where Hickory Creek flows into it. This is on SW 157th Terrace between SW Commanche Road and SW Purity Springs Road. The remains of a grist mill can be found upstream.

The name and spelling of the town was eventually corrupted to Boder. Later, the spelling of the town name changed to "Bodarc" reflecting its present-day pronunciation.

Remaining structures in Bois d'Arc comprise the former post office, a farmhouse, the bridge, and the ruins of the grist mill.

== Education ==
The community is served by Bluestem USD 205 public school district.

== See also ==
- National Register of Historic Places listings in Butler County, Kansas
  - Little Walnut River Pratt Truss Bridge
