= National Register of Historic Places listings in Butler County, Kansas =

Location of Butler County in Kansas

This is a list of the National Register of Historic Places listings in Butler County, Kansas.

This is intended to be a complete list of the properties on the National Register of Historic Places in Butler County, Kansas, United States. The locations of National Register properties for which the latitude and longitude coordinates are included below, may be seen in a map.

There are 27 properties listed on the National Register in the county.

This National Park Service list is complete through NPS recent listings posted November 13, 2026.

== Current listings ==
	Name on the Register	Image	Date listed	Location	City or town	Description
1	Augusta Theater	Augusta Theater	October 31, 1990 (#90001577)	525 State St. 37°40′37″N 96°59′22″W	Augusta	
2	Beaumont Hotel	Beaumont Hotel	February 3, 2012 (#11001078)	11651 SE Main St. 37°39′21″N 96°31′58″W	Beaumont	
3	Beaumont St. Louis and San Francisco Railroad Retention Pond	Beaumont St. Louis and San Francisco Railroad Retention Pond	October 6, 2011 (#11000724)	SE 116th St. & SE Beaumont Rd. 37°39′19″N 96°32′06″W	Beaumont	
4	Beaumont St. Louis and San Francisco Railroad Water Tank	Beaumont St. Louis and San Francisco Railroad Water Tank	August 19, 1993 (#93000843)	Junction of 3rd and D Sts. 37°39′18″N 96°31′51″W	Beaumont	Built in 1875, in Beaumont, Kansas, serving steam locomotives on the St. Louis, Wichita & Western Railway.
5	Butler County Courthouse	Butler County Courthouse	April 26, 2002 (#02000390)	205 W. Central Ave. 37°49′01″N 96°51′06″W	El Dorado	On December 3, 1908, the corner stone was laid; construction was completed the following year. Architects, George P. Washburn & Sons of Ottawa.
6	Creed-Mills House		June 25, 2013 (#13000430)	219 North Maple Street; 37°31′17″N 97°01′05″W	Douglass	
7	Douglass Township Community Building	Douglass Township Community Building	April 27, 1995 (#95000512)	206 S. Forest; 37°31′05″N 97°00′56″W	Douglass	
8	El Dorado Carnegie Library	El Dorado Carnegie Library	June 25, 1987 (#87000931)	101 S. Star; 37°49′00″N 96°51′17″W	El Dorado	
9	El Dorado Historic District	El Dorado Historic District	October 30, 2013 (#13000855)	Roughly 1 blk. E. & W. of N. & S. Main Sts. from E. 3rd to E. Locust Aves. 37°49′03″N 96°50′59″W	El Dorado	
10	El Dorado Missouri Pacific Depot	El Dorado Missouri Pacific Depot	May 6, 1994 (#94000429)	430 N. Main St. 37°49′18″N 96°50′57″W	El Dorado	A one-story red-brick building with a red-tile roof and wide, overhanging eaves, designed by E. M. Tucker, Chief Engineer of the Missouri Pacific, in the Mission architectural style. Built in 1918.
11	First Presbyterian Church of De Graff		June 27, 2014 (#14000346)	1145 NW. 108th St, Burns, KS (mailing address); 37°58′51″N 96°51′44″W	De Graff	
12	Amos H. Gish Building	Amos H. Gish Building	July 3, 2012 (#12000383)	317 S. Main; 37°48′54″N 96°51′01″W	El Dorado	In 1917, Amos Gish commissioned T.R. Reed to build the Amos H. Gish Building. Amos Gish operated his veterinary practice and lived with his family on the second-story and leased the first-story front to retail and the rear as garage space to auto and storage businesses.
13	C. N. James Cabin	C. N. James Cabin	April 13, 1973 (#73000745)	305 State St. 37°39′53″N 96°58′46″W	Augusta	
14	Little Walnut River Pratt Truss Bridge	Little Walnut River Pratt Truss Bridge	May 9, 2003 (#03000377)	SW. 160th Rd., ½ mile west of its intersection with Purity Springs Rd. 37°35′46″N 96°55′24″W	Bois D'Arc	
15	Loomis-Parry Residence	Loomis-Parry Residence	July 8, 2009 (#09000495)	1003 State St. 37°40′56″N 96°58′44″W	Augusta	
16	John Moyle Building	John Moyle Building	June 27, 2014 (#14000347)	605 & 607 N. State St. 37°40′40″N 96°58′45″W	Augusta	
17	Muddy Creek Bridge		July 2, 1985 (#85001425)	Off U.S. Route 77; 37°32′03″N 96°57′04″W	Douglass	
18	Oak Lawn Farm Dairy Barn		November 5, 2005 (#05001202)	12464 NW. Meadowlark; 38°00′24″N 97°05′46″W	Whitewater	
19	James T. Oldham House	James T. Oldham House	November 21, 2006 (#06001054)	321 S. Denver St. 37°48′53″N 96°51′23″W	El Dorado	
20	Polecat Creek Bridge	Polecat Creek Bridge	July 2, 1985 (#85001438)	5 miles west and 2 miles south of Douglass; 37°29′23″N 97°06′33″W	Douglass	
21	Ray L. Smith House	Ray L. Smith House	January 7, 2015 (#14001117)	812 W. Central Ave. 37°49′03″N 96°51′37″W	El Dorado	
22	Towanda Masonic Lodge No. 30 A.F. and A.M.	Towanda Masonic Lodge No. 30 A.F. and A.M.	January 14, 2004 (#03001392)	401 Main St. 37°47′44″N 97°00′09″W	Towanda	
23	US Post Office-Augusta	US Post Office-Augusta	October 17, 1989 (#89001632)	119 E. 5th St. 37°40′33″N 96°58′38″W	Augusta	
24	Viets Block	Viets Block	April 16, 2012 (#12000202)	427, 429, & 431 State St. 37°40′34″N 96°58′45″W	Augusta	
25	Walnut River Crossing of the Cherokee/Fayetteville Oregon-California Trail		September 30, 2019 (#100004457)	Address Restricted	El Dorado	
26	Whitewater Falls Stock Farm	Whitewater Falls Stock Farm	October 8, 2014 (#14000828)	433 Falls Rd. 37°49′53″N 97°02′20″W	Towanda	
27	Yingling Brothers Auto Company	Yingling Brothers Auto Company	July 5, 2011 (#11000409)	411 S. Main St. 37°48′51″N 96°51′01″W	El Dorado	Roadside Kansas MPS

== See also ==
- List of National Historic Landmarks in Kansas
- National Register of Historic Places listings in Kansas
