= Francis Beaumont (disambiguation) =

Francis Beaumont (1584–1616) was an English dramatist.

Francis Beaumont may also refer to:

- Francis Beaumont (MP) (died 1598), English MP for Aldeburgh
- Francis William Beaumont (1903–1941), British film producer
- Francis Beaumont, a character of White Squall (film), 1996
  - Frank Beaumont, a character's son from the film

== See also ==
- Beaumont (disambiguation)
