= Monty Beisel =

American football player (born 1978)

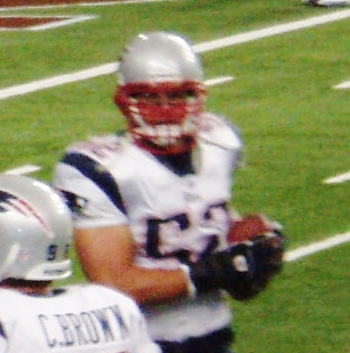
- Beisel with the New England Patriots in 2005

No. 96, 56, 52, 50
- Position: Linebacker

Personal information
- Born: August 20, 1978 (age 48); Victoria, Kansas, U.S.
- Listed height: 6 ft 3 in (1.91 m)
- Listed weight: 244 lb (111 kg)

Career information
- High school: Douglass (Douglass, Kansas)
- College: Kansas State
- NFL draft: 2001: 4th round, 107th overall pick

Career history
- Kansas City Chiefs (2001–2004); New England Patriots (2005); Arizona Cardinals (2006–2008); Kansas City Chiefs (2009); Arizona Cardinals (2009)

Awards and highlights
- Second-team All-Big 12 (2000)

Career NFL statistics
- Total tackles: 252
- Sacks: 4.5
- Forced fumbles: 2
- Fumble recoveries: 1
- Interceptions: 2
- Defensive touchdowns: 1
- Stats at Pro Football Reference

Monty Gene Beisel (/ˈbaɪzəl/; born August 20, 1978) is an American former professional football player who was a linebacker in the National Football League (NFL). He was selected by the Kansas City Chiefs in the fourth round of the 2001 NFL draft. He played college football for the Kansas State Wildcats.

Beisel also played for the New England Patriots and Arizona Cardinals.

== Early life ==
Born in Victoria, Kansas, Beisel graduated from Douglass High School in Douglass, Kansas, in 1997. Beisel was a Parade All-America selection and honorable mention All-USA pick by USA Today in 1996.

== College career ==
Beisel attended college at Kansas State University as a Social Sciences/Mass Communications major. Beisel also played in 44 games accumulating 192 tackles (110 solo), 22.0 sacks, 45.0 stops for loss and 18 passes defended. He was a two-time first-team Academic All-Big 12 selection. He also received All-Big 12 Conference honorable mention and was a second-team Academic All-Big 12 pick.

== Professional career ==
=== Arizona Cardinals (first stint) ===
In Week 6 of the 2008 season, against the Dallas Cowboys, Beisel became the first player in NFL history to score a game-winning touchdown in overtime by returning a blocked punt.

=== Kansas City Chiefs (second stint) ===
He re-signed with the Chiefs during the 2009 off-season. He was released on September 29.

=== Arizona Cardinals (second stint) ===
Beisel was re-signed by Arizona on November 24, 2009. He was released September 3, 2010.

== NFL career statistics ==
Legend
**Bold**	Career high

=== Regular season ===
Year	Team	Games		Tackles					Interceptions					Fumbles			
Year	Team	GP	GS	Cmb	Solo	Ast	Sck	TFL	Int	Yds	TD	Lng	PD	FF	FR	Yds	TD
2001	KAN	**16**	0	22	19	3	0.0	2	0	0	0	0	0	0	0	0	0
2002	KAN	**16**	0	13	10	3	0.0	0	0	0	0	0	0	0	0	0	0
2003	KAN	12	0	24	23	1	1.0	0	0	0	0	0	0	0	0	0	0
2004	KAN	11	**9**	**55**	**44**	11	**2.5**	**3**	**1**	-1	0	-1	**1**	**1**	**1**	**9**	0
2005	NWE	15	6	48	31	**17**	1.0	2	0	0	0	0	**1**	**1**	0	0	0
2006	ARI	8	2	20	18	2	0.0	1	**1**	**11**	0	**11**	**1**	0	0	0	0
2007	ARI	**16**	2	42	32	10	0.0	0	0	0	0	0	0	0	0	0	0
2008	ARI	**16**	0	20	15	5	0.0	1	0	0	0	0	0	0	0	0	0
2009	ARI	6	0	6	6	0	0.0	0	0	0	0	0	0	0	0	0	0
2009	KAN	3	0	2	2	0	0.0	0	0	0	0	0	0	0	0	0	0
Career		119	19	252	200	52	4.5	9	2	10	0	11	3	2	1	9	0

=== Playoffs ===
Year	Team	Games		Tackles					Interceptions					Fumbles			
Year	Team	GP	GS	Cmb	Solo	Ast	Sck	TFL	Int	Yds	TD	Lng	PD	FF	FR	Yds	TD
2003	KAN	1	0	0	0	0	0.0	0	0	0	0	0	0	0	0	0	0
2005	NWE	2	**1**	3	3	0	0.0	**1**	0	0	0	0	0	0	0	0	0
2008	ARI	**4**	**1**	**8**	**4**	**4**	0.0	0	0	0	0	0	0	0	0	0	0
2009	ARI	2	**1**	2	2	0	0.0	0	0	0	0	0	0	0	**2**	0	0
Career		9	3	13	9	4	0.0	1	0	0	0	0	0	0	2	0	0

== Post-football career ==
Since his retirement, Beisel has worked as a real estate agent specializing in luxury homes and condos.
