= Beaumonts =

Beaumonts may refer to:

- J B Beaumont, a British grocery store chain acquired by Sainsbury's Local
- Disappearance of the Beaumont children, in Adelaide, South Australia, in 1966

== See also ==
- Beaumont (disambiguation)
- Beaumont's Halt railway station, Hertfordshire, England 1905–1963
