= Beaumont St. Louis and San Francisco Railroad Retention Pond =

- U.S. National Register of Historic Places
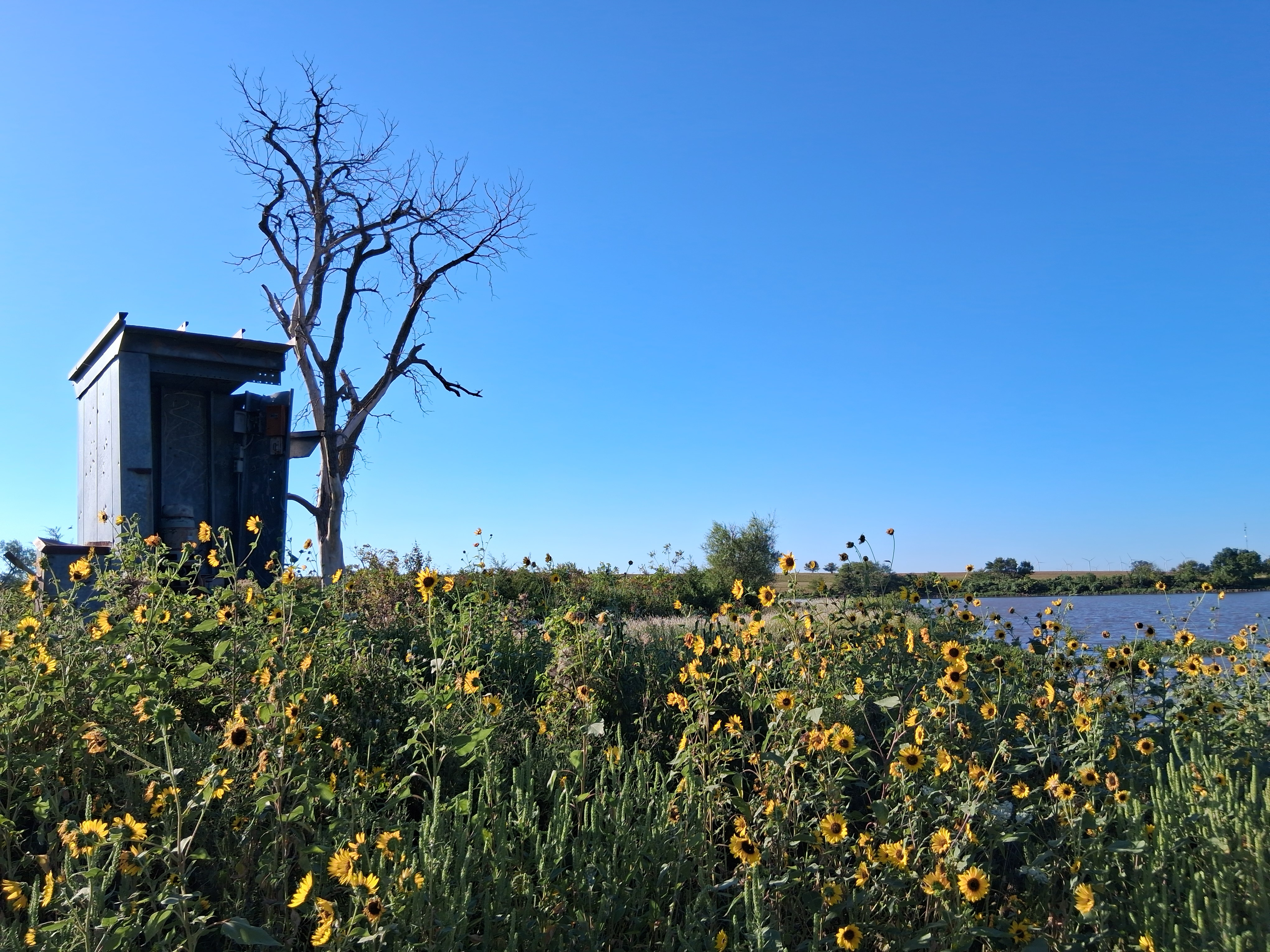
- Old metal pumping station at the southern pond (2026)

- Location within Kansas Location within the United States
- Location: SE 116 Street and SE Beaumont Road, Beaumont, Kansas
- Coordinates: 37°39′18.17″N 96°32′5.584″W
- Built: 1886
- Architect: St. Louis, Wichita, and Western Railway Company
- NRHP reference No.: 11000724
- Added to NRHP: October 6, 2011

The Beaumont St. Louis and San Francisco Railroad Retention Pond is a retention pond originally constructed by the St. Louis, Wichita, and Western Railway Company as a supply pond for the Beaumont St. Louis and San Francisco Railroad Water Tank. It served the St. Louis, Wichita, and Western Railway, and supplied the water tank, which was used to refill the boilers of steam locomotives on that line. It was added to the National Register of Historic Places in 2011. From the year of construction until about 1955, when the railroad switched to diesel locomotives, this watering station was essential to railroad transportation.

The pond is constructed of concrete and metal, and contains a pumphouse with a pump. As the tower was made redundant by the switch to diesel locomotives, the pond and water tank remained vital to the Beaumont community. The pump station was kept active and pipe was laid throughout the town for potable water supply. The tower continued to hold water and was in limited use until 1988.

== See also ==
- National Register of Historic Places listings in Butler County, Kansas
