= Beaumont Hotel (Beaumont, Kansas) =

- U.S. National Register of Historic Places
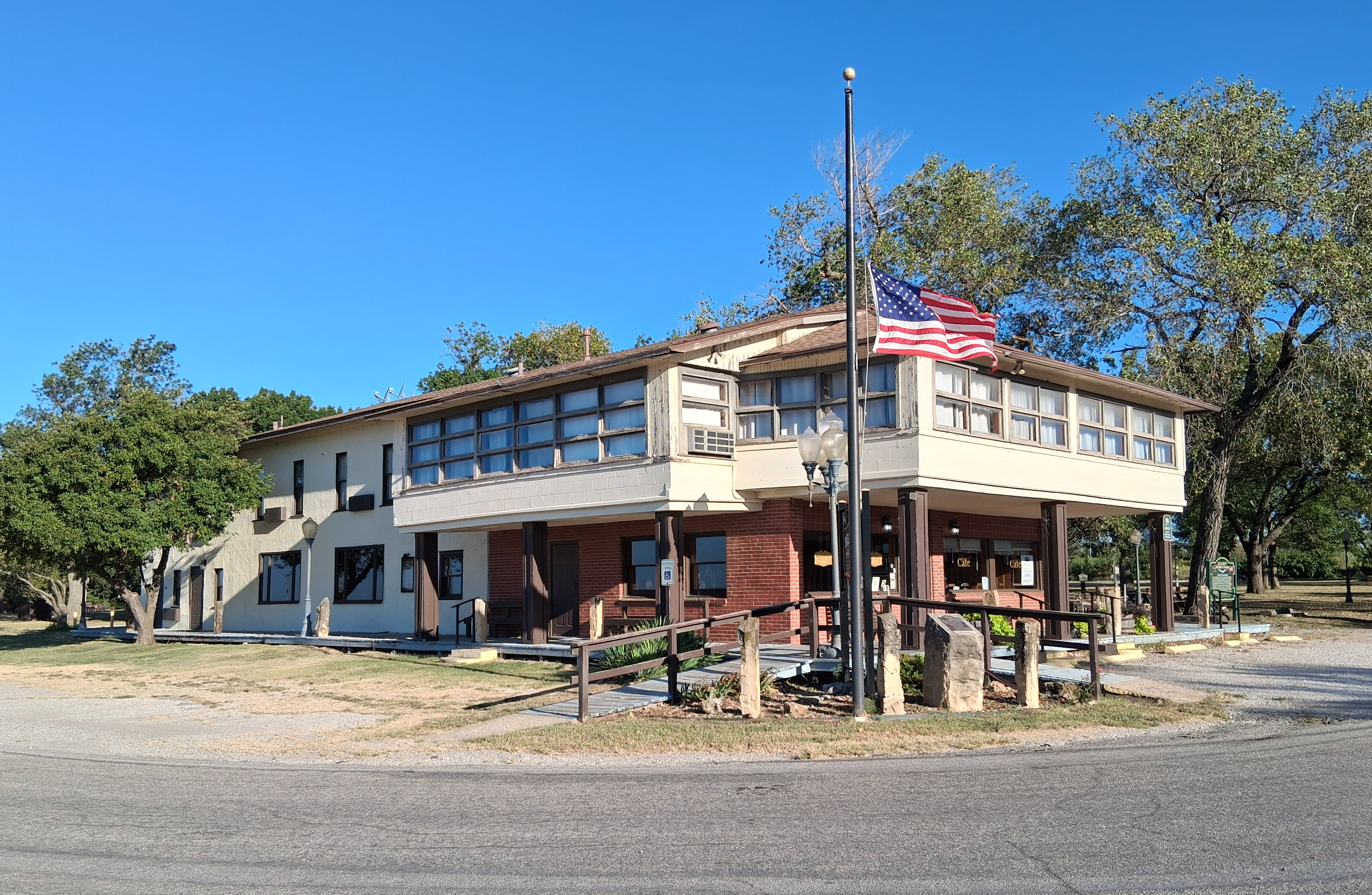
- Beaumont Hotel in 2026

- Location within Kansas Location within the United States
- Location: 11651 SE. Main St., Beaumont, Kansas
- Coordinates: 37°39′20.132″N 96°31′58.323″W
- Built: 1879
- NRHP reference No.: 11001078
- Added to NRHP: February 3, 2012

Logo

The Beaumont Hotel is a former railroad hotel constructed in 1879 in Beaumont, Kansas. It originally opened and operated as the "Summit Hotel". It currently operates as a bed and breakfast, RV Park and restaurant.

Beginning in the 1940s, local ranchers began using Main Street (also known historically as Third Street) as a landing strip for their planes while checking on cattle herds. In 1953, the hotel underwent a major renovation and acquired 70 acres of adjoining property, which was converted into a dedicated landing strip to serve the new clientele. The hotel is a popular destination for small aircraft pilots and motorcycle rallies.

The oldest wooden water tower in the United States, the Beaumont St. Louis and San Francisco Railroad Water Tank, is located near the hotel.

== See also ==
- National Register of Historic Places listings in Butler County, Kansas
