= Augusta High School =

Augusta High School may refer to:

== In the United States ==
- Augusta High School (Arkansas), Augusta, Arkansas
- Augusta High School (Kansas), Augusta, Kansas
- Augusta High School (Kentucky), Augusta, Kentucky
- Augusta High School (Montana), Augusta, Montana
- North Augusta High School, North Augusta, South Carolina
- Augusta High School (Wisconsin), Augusta, Wisconsin
