= Yingling (disambiguation) =

Yingling is a variant of the surname Jüngling.

Yingling may also refer to:

- Yingling Brothers Auto Company, a former company and historic building in El Dorado, Kansas, U.S.
- Yingling Nunatak, in Antarctica
- Qiu Yingling (born 1980), Chinese field hockey player

== See also ==
- Yuengling
