= Keighley, Kansas =

Unincorporated community in Butler County, Kansas

Coordinates: 37°40′21″N 96°38′34″W

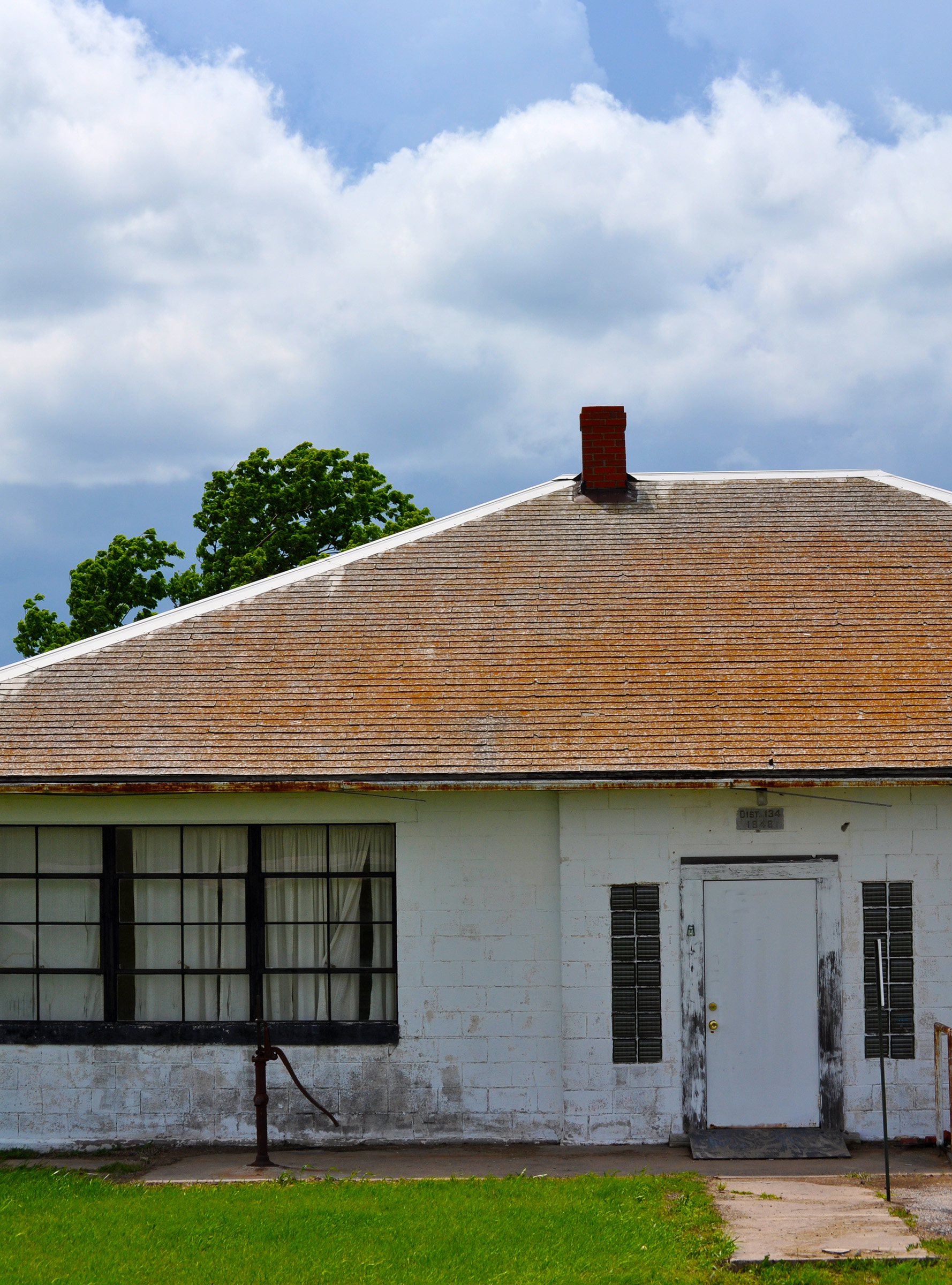
Former schoolhouse in Keighley (2015)

Keighley is an unincorporated community in Butler County, Kansas, United States.

== History ==
A post office was opened in Keighley in 1880, and remained in operation until being discontinued in 1943.

Until 1925, Keighley was a stop on the St. Louis–San Francisco Railway, east of Augusta, though that changed after the first oil strike. The small trading post became a community of 500 people and included a grain elevator, a hardware store, hotel, lumber yard, café, post office and general store. In 1927, Keighley District completed at a cost of $15,000 a brick school building. In 1926, a fire destroyed the lumber yard and hotel. The brick school house burned down and was replaced in 1948 by a school house of cinder block, which still stands. By 1934, the once busy roads of Keighley were again simply highways. Today, it is on U.S. Route 400, east of Leon and west of Beaumont.

== Education ==
The community is served by Bluestem USD 205 public school district.
