= Mr. Beat =

American internet personality (born 1981)

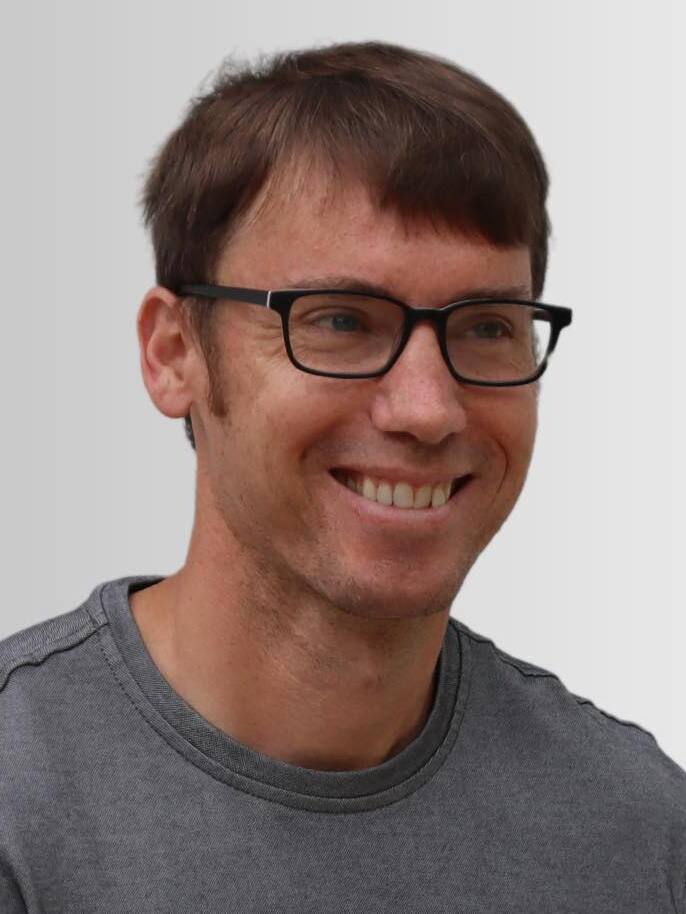
- Beat c. 2023
- Born: Matthew Alan Beat; November 6, 1981 (age 45); Topeka, Kansas, U.S.
- Education: University of Kansas; University of Nebraska Omaha; Emporia State University (MA)
- Occupations: Social studies teacher, YouTuber
- Spouse: Shannon Beat (m. 2005)
- Children: 2

YouTube information
- Channel: iammrbeat
- Years active: 2006–present
- Genres: Politics, history, geography
- Subscribers: 1.44 million
- Views: 405 million
- Last updated: November 15, 2026
- Website: iammrbeat.com

Matthew Alan Beat (born November 6, 1981), better known online as Mr. Beat, is an American internet personality, educator, and author. Originally a social studies teacher in Kansas, Beat began publishing music videos and live performances of his band Electric Needle Room on YouTube in 2006. He moved to the Mr. Beat account in 2009 and began uploading two years later.

Beat's videos focus on politics, economics, geography, and history, primarily in the United States. Beat is a Fellow at the Dole Institute of Politics, where he is a regular speaker. He has authored two books: The Power of Our Supreme Court (2023) and Mr. Beat Presents... The Ultimate American Presidential Election Book: Every Presidential Election in American History (2020/2024).

== Early life and education ==
Matthew Alan Beat was born on November 6, 1981 in Topeka, Kansas and was raised in the town of Augusta, Kansas, graduating from Augusta High School in 2000. Beat has stated he was raised Catholic. He graduated from the University of Kansas in 2004 and the University of Nebraska Omaha in 2009 with degrees in journalism and education, respectively. He received a Master's Degree in history from Emporia State University in 2017.

== Teaching career ==
Beat was a high school social studies teacher, teaching at Blue Valley High School in Overland Park, Kansas and eventually Tonganoxie High School in Tonganoxie, Kansas. While at Tonganoxie High School, Beat and his students petitioned U.S. President Barack Obama to visit the school in 2015, but the effort was unsuccessful. In 2021, Beat left classroom teaching to pursue a career as a full-time YouTuber.

== YouTube career ==
Beat's first YouTube channel was for Electric Needle Room, an indie pop band which he founded with his brother, Steven. The band is named for a joke in The Simpsons episode "Little Big Mom". He began posting live performances and music videos from the band in 2006, though the band itself formed in 2005. Electric Needle Room continues to perform live and releases music regularly.

Beat's best-known and most popular channel was created in August 2009. Originally named "Mr. Beat's Social Studies Channel", it was later shortened to "Mr. Beat". Beat posts various videos on the channel relating to United States government and history - especially regarding United States presidents. He has created several video series, such as Compared, Social Studies Songs, Supreme Court Briefs, Story Time With Mr. Beat, and Presidential Elections In American History, the latter of which was compiled and published as a book in 2020, with an updated version covering the 2020 and 2024 elections having been released in 2024.

Beat in 2021

Beat is an enthusiast for the history of the U.S. presidency, with songs about all of the former presidents and a series chronicling every presidential election in American history. He also occasionally creates historical parody songs for Electric Needle Room. Additionally, Beat runs a second channel, "The Beat Goes On" where he mainly focuses on videos on other topics such as music, films, and cultural trends. He also co-hosts the podcast "Jobsolete" with Helen Hong, exploring jobs of the past.

Mr. Beat has been critical of conservative YouTube channel PragerU. He has made videos reprehending it, including a 7-hour livestream. When doing another livestream on the two-axis political compass chart, he identified himself as a left-wing libertarian. Beat has publicly acknowledged that his personal views may influence his content, and has expressed concern about what he sees as a tension between widespread access to information and public resistance to critical thinking. In the lead-up to the 2024 United States presidential election, Beat made a YouTube post stating he had voted for Kamala Harris early without mentioning her by name, calling Donald Trump a "danger to our republic." Following Trump's victory in the 2024 election, in several YouTube Shorts, Beat has criticized aspects of Donald Trump’s second presidency. In interviews and videos, he has described Trump as the most authoritarian U.S. president since Woodrow Wilson and criticized specific administration actions, from indirectly seeing members of the Trump administration as reactionaries instead of "conservatives," to what he sees as attempts to erase parts of American history. As a result, Beat has described Donald Trump as the worst president in American history, arguing that Trump is primarily concerned with himself and his own interests rather than caring for the American people. Despite being openly critical of Trump, Beat has stated that he aims to keep a more neutral tone in his longer videos. He collaborated with the highest-subscribed channel MrBeast in 2026, creating a video on the history of YouTube and joking about their names' similarity.

=== Government-related activities ===
In January 2022, Beat livestreamed himself calling the office of every Senator in the United States, an endeavor which took eleven hours. Beat likewise called the office of every United States Representative that October, which took him nine days. The purpose of Beat's calls were to gain support for election reform, with his October livestream focusing on the Election Day Holiday Act (HR222), a bill introduced in the 117th Congress by Rep. Anna Eshoo to make Election Day a federal holiday in the United States. Though Beat received responses from several members of the House and Senate, specifically Senator Cory Booker, who sent Beat a personal video response, Beat ultimately stated "this experience has been a total letdown and has made me question our representative democracy".

Mr. Beat leading an "Uncap the House" meeting in Lawrence, Kansas

On January 1, 2026, Beat posted a video on his social media channels stating he would be emailing U.S. representative Tracey Mann every day until he received a reply; he specifically requested Mann's stance on expanding the size of the House of Representatives. Beat has encouraged his followers to write to Mann or their own lawmakers regarding House expansion, stating "I want to make a difference ...because I am worried about the future of our country." In March 2026, Mann responded to Beat, but disagreed with his request.

Beat has interviewed multiple government officials, such as California Governor Gavin Newsom, Senators Jeff Merkley and Cory Booker, as well as Congressmen Adam Smith and Sean Casten, the latter of which he called his "new favorite congressman". In his interview with Newsom, the governor noted Beat's attempts to contact his congressmen, and supported his goal.

== Other activities ==
Mr. Beat at a rally for 2026 Kansas gubernatorial candidate Cindy Holscher

In September 2026, Mr. Beat began co-hosting an American Civil Liberties Union podcast called Let the Record Show with Shereen Marisol Meraji. The podcast is focused on American history, with each episode focusing on a major court case from US history.

Mr. Beat was the keynote speaker at an anti-data center rally in Tonganoxie, Kansas, in October 2026.

== Personal life ==
He has a wife, Shannon, and two children, a brother, with whom he maintains the music-oriented channel Electric Needle Room, as well as a sister. As of 2026, Beat was based in Lawrence, Kansas.

== Bibliography ==
- Beat, Matt (2024) [2020]. Mr. Beat presents...The Ultimate American Presidential Election Book: Every Presidential Election in American History (1788-2024). ISBN 979-8309998395.
- Beat, Matt (2023). The Power of Our Supreme Court: How Supreme Court Cases Shape Democracy. TMA Press. ISBN 978-1684810673.
