= Lincoln Township, Butler County, Kansas =

Lincoln Township Butler County, Kansas
- Township
- Location within Butler County

- Location within Kansas
- Coordinates: 37°59′05″N 096°52′06″W
- Country: United States
- State: Kansas
- County: Butler

Area
  - Total: 99.97 sq mi (258.92 km^{2})
  - Land: 99.33 sq mi (257.26 km^{2})
  - Water: 0.64 sq mi (1.66 km^{2}) 0.64%
- Elevation: 1,434 ft (437 m)

Population (2000)
  - Total: 317
  - Density: 3.19/sq mi (1.23/km^{2})
- Time zone: UTC-6 (CST)
  - Summer (DST): UTC-5 (CDT)
- FIPS code: 20-40500
- GNIS ID: 474387
- Website: County website

Lincoln Township is a township in Butler County, Kansas, United States. As of the 2000 census, its population was 317.

== History ==
Lincoln Township was organized in 1879.

== Geography ==
Lincoln Township covers an area of 99.97 square miles (258.9 km^{2}) and contains no incorporated settlements.

== Communities ==
The township contains the following settlements:

- Unincorporated community of De Graff.

== Education ==
- Eden Christian School, Private Mennonite Grade School, approximately three miles south of Burns, located at 38.040139°N 96.896199°W

== Cemeteries ==
The township contains the following cemeteries:

- Eden Mennonite Church Cemetery, located in Section 20 T23S R5E.
- According to the USGS, it contains two cemeteries: Baker and Ridgeway.
