= Loomis–Parry Residence =

Historic house in Kansas, United States

- Loomis–Parry House
- U.S. National Register of Historic Places
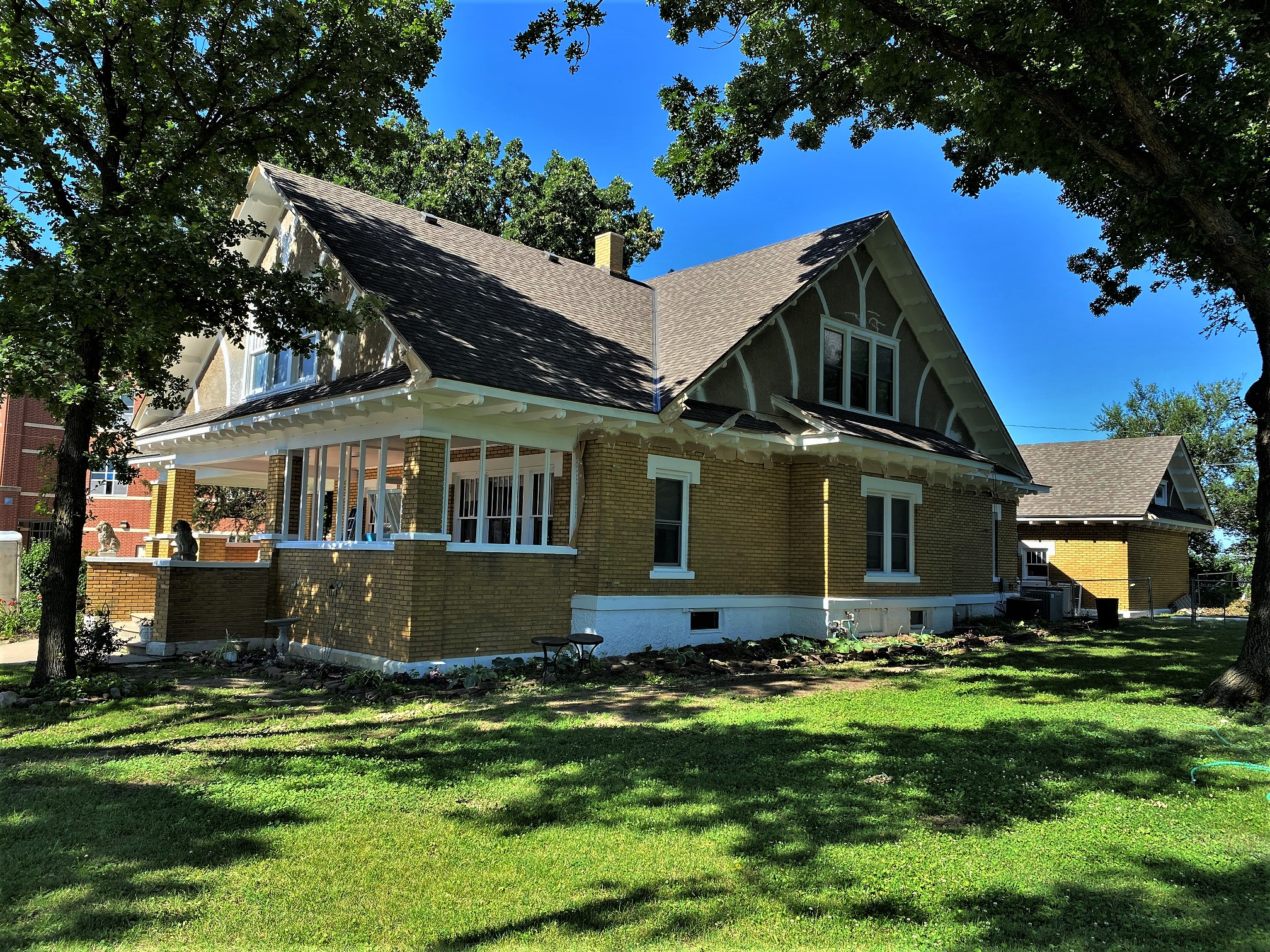

- Location within Kansas Location within the United States
- Location: 1003 State Street, Augusta, Kansas
- Coordinates: 37°40′56.4″N 96°58′44.35″W
- Built: 1917
- Architectural style: Craftsman, Tudor Revival
- NRHP reference No.: 09000495
- Added to NRHP: July 8, 2009

The Loomis–Parry Residence is a mixed-style residential house, constructed in 1917, in Augusta, Kansas. It is a 2-story structure, with an irregular floor plan, that retains nearly all of its original materials, including exterior brick walls and double-hung wooden windows. It has been continuously owned by the same family who originally constructed it. A widow named Henrietta Loomis commissioned the house as a residence for herself and her daughter. Her husband's family, who had been farmers, owned land in Butler County where oil was discovered in the early 1900s. The oil revenue financed the construction. The Loomis–Parry Residence was added to the National Register of Historic Places in 2009.

== See also ==
- National Register of Historic Places listings in Butler County, Kansas
