= Godwin's Halt railway station =

Disused railway station in Highfield, Hertfordshire

Godwin's Halt

General information
- Location: Highfield, Hertfordshire; England
- Coordinates: 51.7677°N 0.4522°W
- Grid reference: TL069088
- Platforms: 1

Other information
- Status: Disused

History
- Original company: Midland Railway
- Pre-grouping: Midland Railway
- Post-grouping: London, Midland and Scottish Railway

Key dates
- 9 August 1905: Opened
- 16 June 1947: Closed to passengers
- 2 March 1964: Closed to goods
Location

Godwin's Halt railway station served the area of Highfield, Hertfordshire, England from 1905 to 1964 on the Nickey Line.

== History ==
The station opened on 9 August 1905 by the Midland Railway. It was situated west of a footpath that linked Pennine and Saturn Way. A siding was added in 1884 with a second one being added shortly after. A shelter was added in 1907 after a petition was raised. The station closed to passengers on 16 June 1947 and closed to goods traffic on 2 March 1964.

Preceding station	Disused railways	Following station
Beaumont's Halt; Line and station closed	Midland Railway; Nickey Line	Hemel Hempstead; Line and station closed
