= Augusta High School (Kansas) =

Public high school in Augusta, Kansas

Coordinates: 37.6968°N 96.9699°W

Location
- 2020 Ohio Street; Augusta, Kansas 67010; United States

Information
- Type: Public high school
- Principal: Corey Gabbert
- Staff: 42.40 (FTE)
- Enrollment: 627 (2023-24)
- Student to teacher ratio: 14.79
- Colors: Black and orange
- Nickname: Orioles
- Website: Augusta High School

Augusta High School is a public secondary school in Augusta, Kansas, United States, operated by Augusta USD 402 school district, and located at 2020 Ohio Street. The school mascot is the oriole and the school's colors are black and orange. The school competes in the Ark Valley Chisholm Trail League.

== Notable alumni ==
- Matthew Beat, internet personality, educator, and author.
- Madelyn Dunham, maternal grandmother of U.S. President Barack Obama, graduated from the school in 1940.

== See also ==
- List of high schools in Kansas
- List of unified school districts in Kansas
