= C. N. James Cabin =

Historic house in Kansas, United States

- U.S. National Register of Historic Places
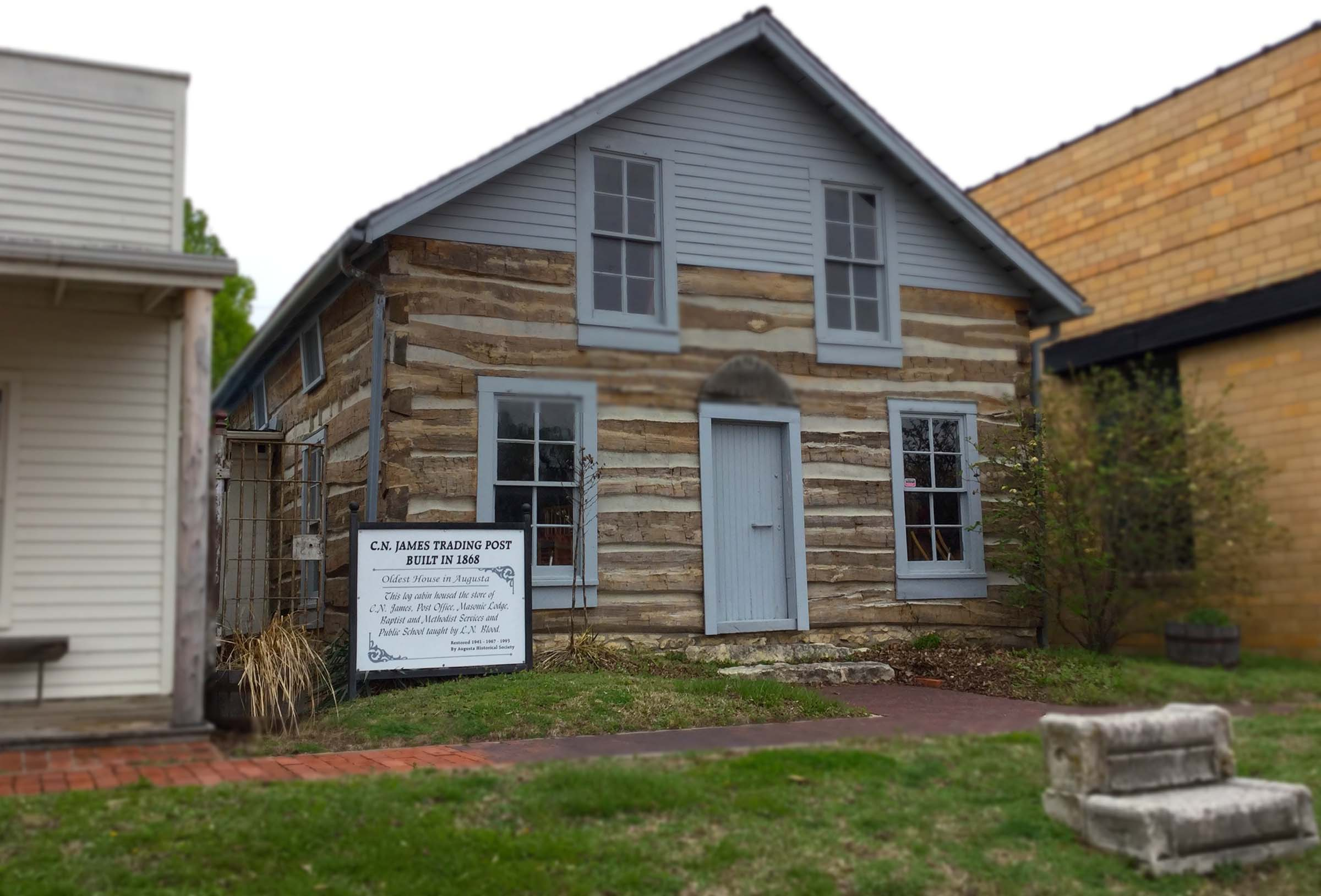

- Location within Kansas Location within the United States
- Location: 305 State St. Augusta, Kansas
- Coordinates: 37°39′53″N 96°58′46″W
- Built: 1868
- Architectural style: American frontier
- NRHP reference No.: 73000745
- Added to NRHP: April 13, 1973

The C. N. James Cabin is a frontier-style log cabin, originally used as both a store and home, constructed in 1868. It was later also used as a church. It stands in what is now Augusta, Kansas, United States. The builder and proprietor of the store were Chester N. James, a merchant who moved to the area to establish a trading post. James was a central figure in the organization of Augusta Township and eventually the incorporation of Augusta itself. Augusta is named after James' wife. The C. N. James Cabin was added to the National Register of Historic Places in 1994. It has been restored to its original appearance and is now the part of the Augusta Historical Museum, which is operated by the Augusta Historical Society.

== See also ==
- National Register of Historic Places listings in Butler County, Kansas
