= Little Walnut River Pratt Truss Bridge =

- U.S. National Register of Historic Places
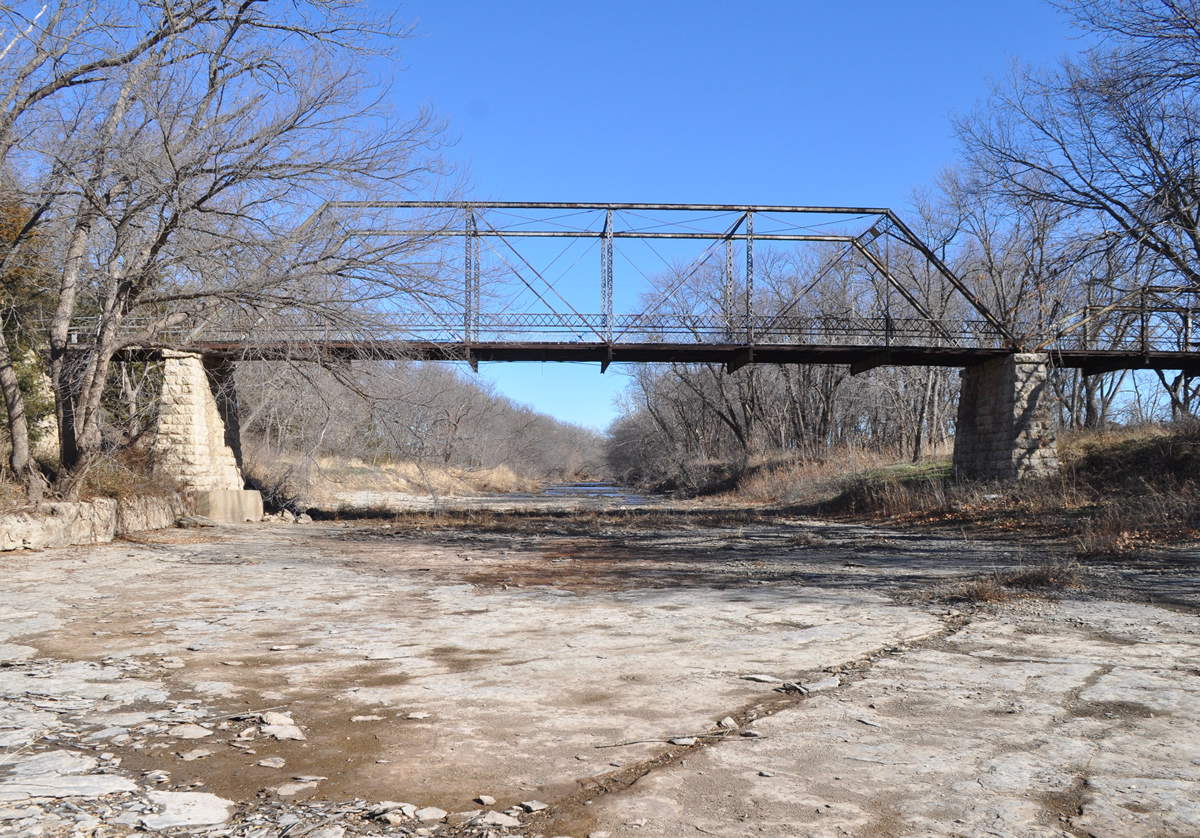
- Side view of the Little Walnut River Pratt Truss Bridge

- Location within Kansas Location within the United States
- Location: SW 160th Road, 0.5 miles (0.80 km) West of intersection with Purity Springs Road, Bois d'Arc, Kansas
- Coordinates: 37°35′46.84″N 96°55′24.02″W
- Built: 1885
- Architect: Kansas City Bridge & Iron Co.
- NRHP reference No.: 03000377
- Added to NRHP: May 9, 2003

The Little Walnut River Pratt Truss Bridge is a Pratt truss bridge constructed shortly after 1885, in Bois d'Arc, Kansas. It was constructed by the Kansas City Bridge and Iron Company as a carriage, horse and pedestrian bridge over the Little Hickory Creek, which joins the Walnut River in southern Butler County. It was added to the National Register of Historic Places in 2003.

== The Bridge ==
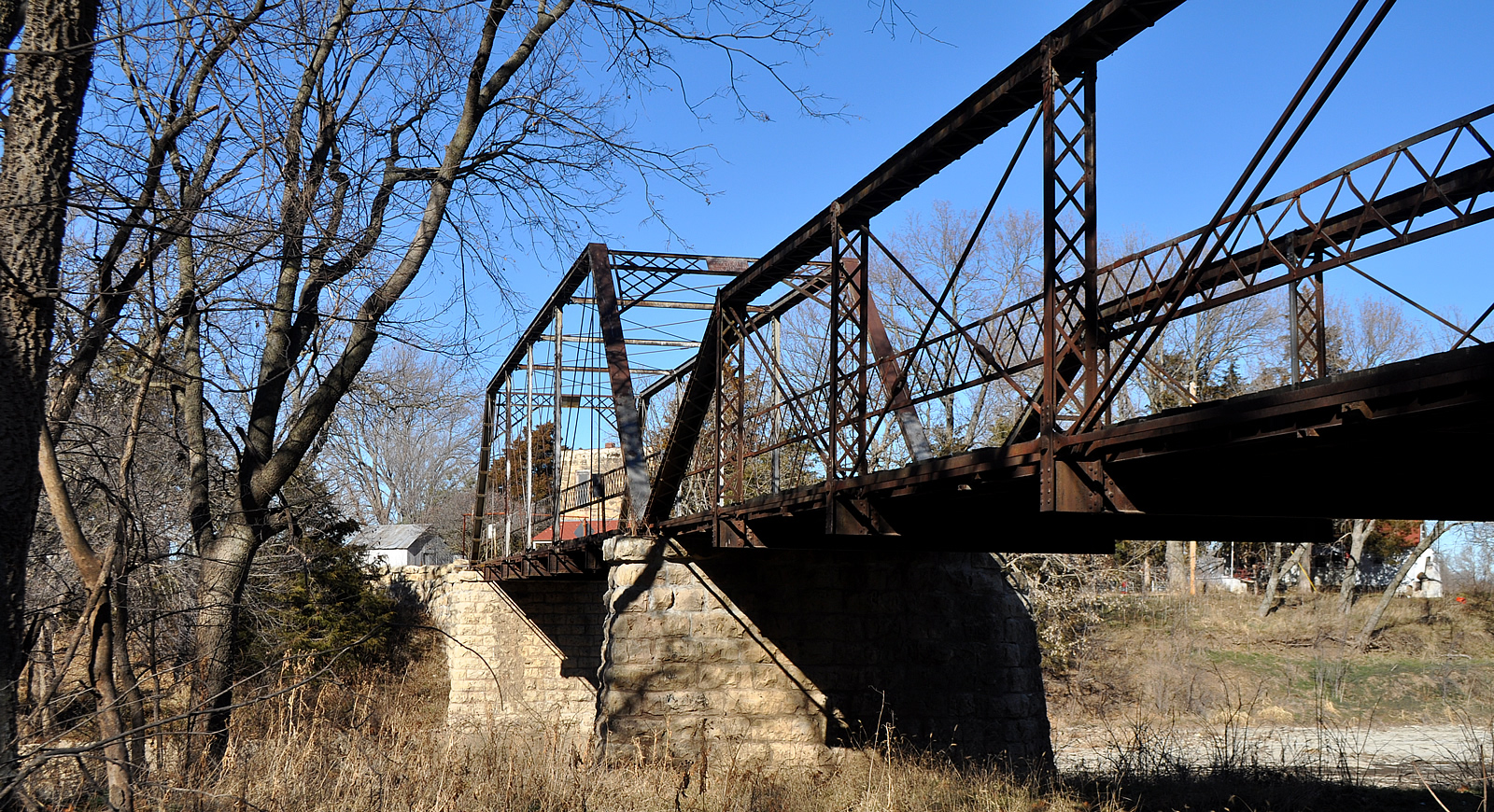
Little Walnut River Pratt Truss Bridge from the river

The one lane bridge is no longer accessible to vehicle traffic. The bridge consists of two distinct spans, one span of 102 feet (31 m) and the other 75 feet (23 m) in length, both of which are of the Pratt Truss bridge design.

The supporting structure is constructed of iron manufactured by the Carnegie Steel Company. The road surface is heavy timber. The total length of the bridge is 196.8 feet (60.0 m) and the width of the deck is 13.4 feet (4.1 m).

== See also ==
- List of bridges on the National Register of Historic Places in Kansas
- National Register of Historic Places listings in Butler County, Kansas
