= Gordon, Kansas =

Unincorporated community in Butler County, Kansas

- Unincorporated community
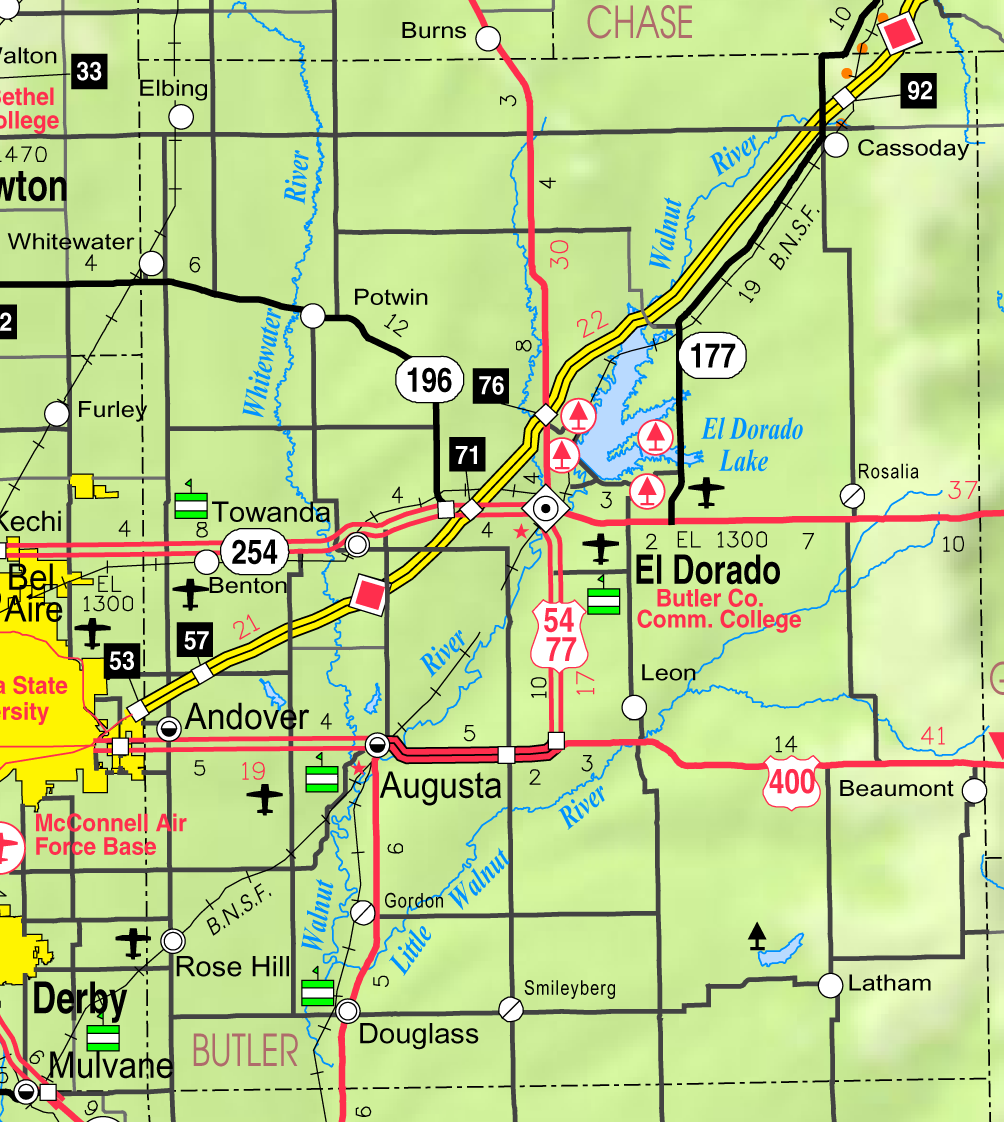
- KDOT map of Butler County (legend)

- Location within Kansas Location within the United States
- Coordinates: 37°35′19″N 96°59′26″W
- Country: United States
- State: Kansas
- County: Butler
- Elevation: 1,217 ft (371 m)
- Time zone: UTC-6 (CST)
  - Summer (DST): UTC-5 (CDT)
- FIPS code: 20-26950
- GNIS ID: 475032

Gordon is an unincorporated community in Butler County, Kansas, United States.

== History ==
A post office existed in Gordon from June 30, 1884, to June 30, 1936.

Gordon was a station on the Atchison, Topeka and Santa Fe Railway.

== Education ==
The community is served by Augusta USD 402 public school district.

== Notable people ==
- Tom Sturdivant, baseball player who pitched for ten seasons on seven different teams.
- Rosalie E. Wahl, Minnesota Supreme Court justice, was born in Gordon.
