= Wingate, Kansas =

Ghost Town in Kansas, Oklahoma

Coordinates: 37°28′55″N 96°41′51″W

Wingate is a ghost town in Butler County, Kansas, United States. No buildings remain at this former community site.

== History ==
Wingate had a short-lived post office in the 1880s.

== Education ==
The modern day rural area around Wingate is served by the Bluestem USD 205 public school district.

== See also ==
- List of ghost towns in Kansas
