= Douglass Township Community Building =

- U.S. National Register of Historic Places
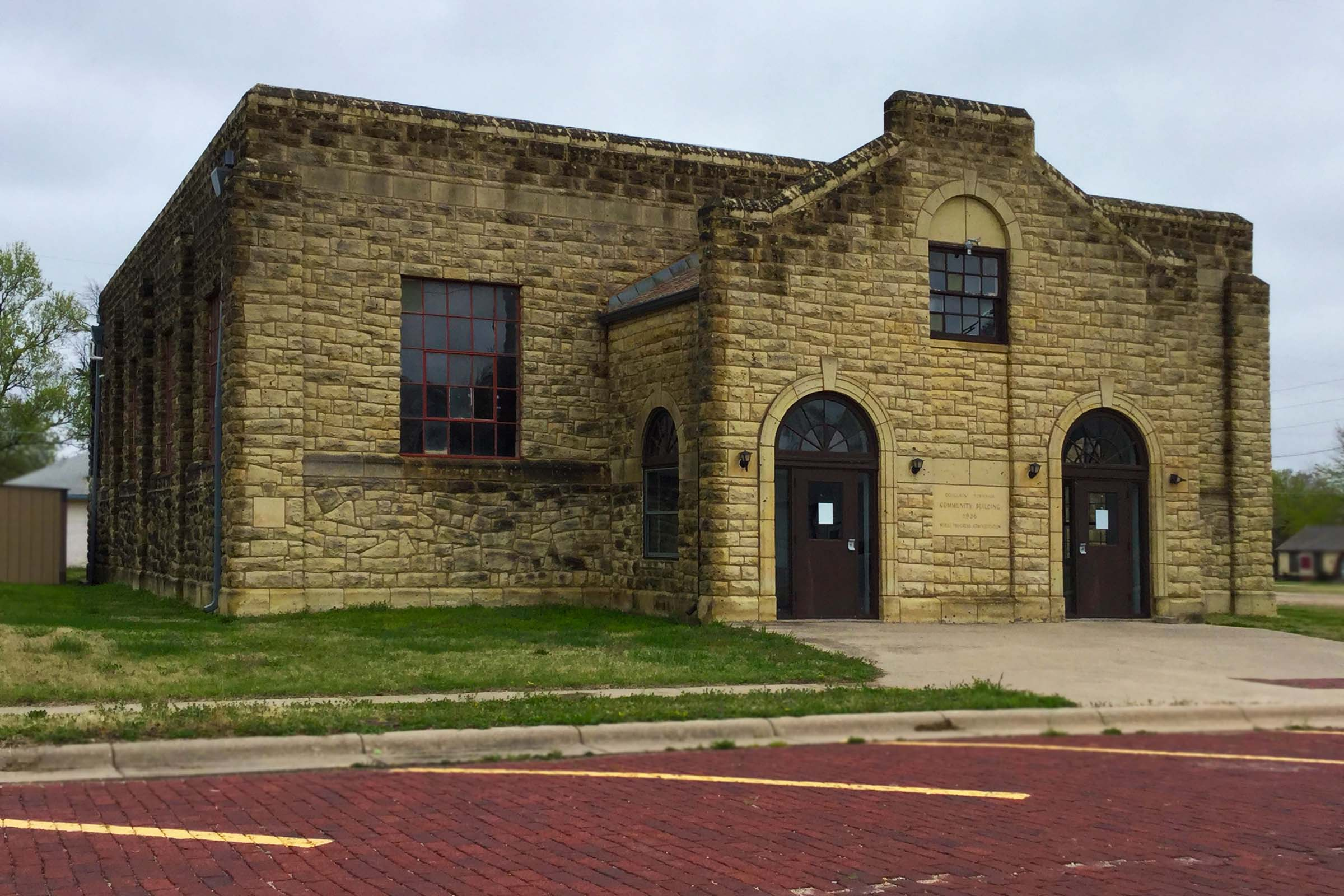
- Douglass township community building (2017)

- Location within Kansas Location within the United States
- Location: 206 S Forest, Douglass, Kansas
- Coordinates: 37°30′55.81″N 97°00′57.08″W
- Built: 1936
- Architect: J. Hamilton
- Architectural style: Rustic
- NRHP reference No.: 95000512
- Added to NRHP: April 27, 1995

The Douglass Township Community Building is a community recreational auditorium and sports facility constructed in 1936, in Douglass, Kansas. It was designed by architect J. Hamilton. It was added to the National Register of Historic Places in 1995.

== See also ==
- National Register of Historic Places listings in Butler County, Kansas
