= Bluestem USD 205 =

Public school district in Leon, Kansas

Address
- 625 S. Mill Rd. Leon, Kansas, 67074; United States
- Coordinates: 37°41′3″N 96°47′13″W

District information
- Type: Public
- Grades: K to 12
- Schools: 2

Other information
- Website: usd205.com

Bluestem USD 205 is a public unified school district headquartered in Leon, Kansas, United States. The district includes the communities of Leon, Latham, Beaumont, Bois d'Arc, Haverhill, Keighley, Wingate, and nearby rural areas.

== History ==
In August 2023, voters approved a bond to add class rooms and storm shelters to the elementary school and high school.

== Schools ==
The school district operates the following schools:

- Bluestem Jr/Sr High School
- Bluestem Elementary School

== See also ==
- Kansas State Department of Education
- Kansas State High School Activities Association
- List of high schools in Kansas
- List of unified school districts in Kansas
