= Augusta USD 402 =

Public school district in Augusta, Kansas

Address
- 2345 Greyhound Dr. Augusta, Kansas, 67010; United States
- Coordinates: 37°42′2″N 96°57′56″W

District information
- Type: Public
- Grades: K to 12
- Schools: 5

Other information
- Website: usd402.com

Augusta USD 402 is a public unified school district headquartered in Augusta, Kansas, United States. The district includes the communities of Augusta, Gordon, and nearby rural areas.

== Schools ==
The school district operates the following schools:

- Augusta High School
- Augusta Middle School
- Ewalt Elementary School
- Garfield Elementary School
- Lincoln Elementary School

== See also ==
- Kansas State Department of Education
- Kansas State High School Activities Association
- List of high schools in Kansas
- List of unified school districts in Kansas
