= Douglass High School (Kansas) =

Location
- 910 East 1st Street; Douglass, Kansas 67039; United States; 37.5206°N 97.0052°W

Information
- School type: Public, High School
- School district: Douglass USD 396
- CEEB code: 170800
- Teaching staff: 17.58 (FTE)
- Enrollment: 214 (2023-2024)
- Student to teacher ratio: 12.17
- Website: www.usd396.net/332119_2

Douglass High School is a public secondary school in Douglass, Kansas, United States. It is located at 910 East 1st Street, and operated by Douglass USD 396 public school district. The Douglass High School mascot is the bulldog and the school's colors are purple and gold.

== See also ==
- List of high schools in Kansas
- List of unified school districts in Kansas
