= Douglass USD 396 =

Public school district in Douglass, Kansas

Address
- 921 E. 1st St. Douglass, Kansas, 67039; United States
- Coordinates: 37°31′9″N 97°0′17″W

District information
- Type: Public
- Grades: K to 12
- Schools: 3

Other information
- Website: usd396.net

Douglass USD 396 is a public unified school district headquartered in Douglass, Kansas, United States. The district includes the community of Douglass and nearby rural areas.

== Schools ==
The school district operates the following schools:

- Douglass High School
- Sisk Middle School
- Seal Elementary School

== See also ==
- Kansas State Department of Education
- Kansas State High School Activities Association
- List of high schools in Kansas
- List of unified school districts in Kansas
