= Beaumont Hotel =

Beaumont Hotel may refer to:

== United Kingdom ==
- Beaumont Hotel, London

== United States ==
- Beaumont Hotel (Ouray, Colorado), listed on the National Register of Historic Places (NRHP) in Ouray County
- Beaumont Hotel (Beaumont, Kansas), listed on the NRHP in Butler County
- Beaumont Hotel (Mayville, Wisconsin), listed on the NRHP in Dodge County
