= Douglass, Kansas =

City in Butler County, Kansas

- City
- Location within Butler County and Kansas

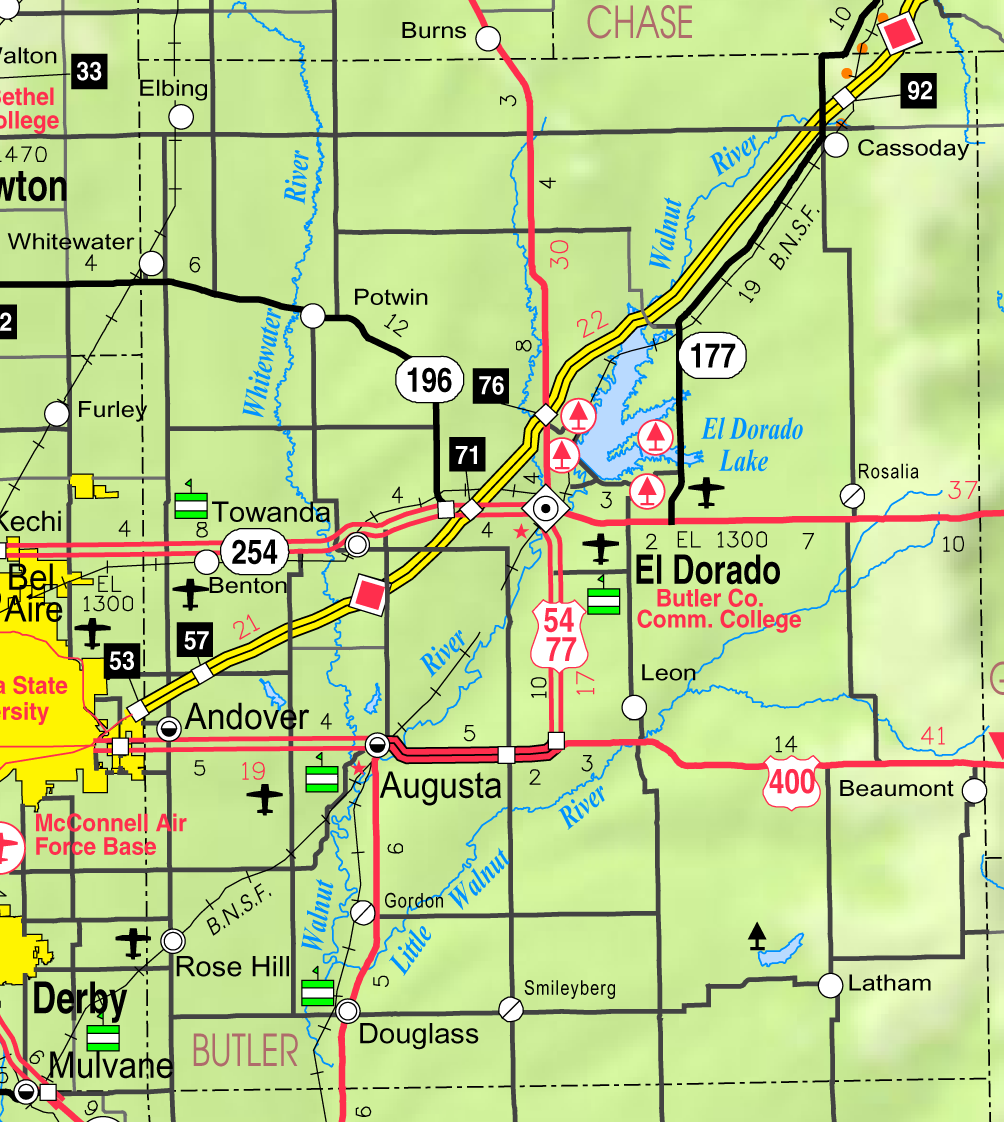
- KDOT map of Butler County (legend)
- Coordinates: 37°31′10″N 97°0′46″W
- Country: United States
- State: Kansas
- County: Butler
- Founded: 1869
- Incorporated: 1879
- Named for: Joseph Douglass

Government
  - Type: Mayor–Council
  - Mayor: Mike Shirley

Area
  - Total: 1.06 sq mi (2.75 km^{2})
  - Land: 1.06 sq mi (2.75 km^{2})
  - Water: 0 sq mi (0.00 km^{2})
- Elevation: 1,204 ft (367 m)

Population (2020)
  - Total: 1,555
  - Density: 1,460/sq mi (565/km^{2})
- Time zone: UTC-6 (CST)
  - Summer (DST): UTC-5 (CDT)
- ZIP Code: 67039
- Area code: 316
- FIPS code: 20-18400
- GNIS ID: 2394553
- Website: cityofdouglassks.com

Douglass is a city in Butler County, Kansas, United States. As of the 2020 census, the population of the city was 1,555.

== History ==
=== 19th century ===
The first settlement was made at Douglass in 1869. Douglass is named for its founder, Joseph W. Douglass, a storeowner who was fatally shot at the town site in 1873 while apprehending a suspected chicken thief. Douglass was incorporated as a city of the third class in 1879.

In 1877, the Florence, El Dorado, and Walnut Valley Railroad Company built a branch line from Florence to El Dorado, in 1881 it was extended to Douglass, and later to Arkansas City. The line was leased and operated by the Atchison, Topeka and Santa Fe Railway. The line from Florence to El Dorado was abandoned in 1942. The original branch line connected Florence, Burns, De Graff, El Dorado, Augusta, Douglass, Rock, Akron, Winfield and Arkansas City.

=== 21st century ===
In 2010, the Keystone-Cushing Pipeline (Phase II) was constructed about 1.8 miles west of Douglass, north to south through Butler County.

== Geography ==
According to the United States Census Bureau, the city has a total area of 1.08 square miles (2.80 km^{2}), all land.

=== Climate ===
The climate in this area is characterized by hot, humid summers and generally mild to cool winters. According to the Köppen Climate Classification system, Douglass has a humid subtropical climate, abbreviated "Cfa" on climate maps.

== Demographics ==
Historical population
Census	Pop.	Note	%±
1880	369		—
1890	737		99.7%
1900	755		2.4%
1910	657		−13.0%
1920	1,010		53.7%
1930	804		−20.4%
1940	760		−5.5%
1950	729		−4.1%
1960	1,058		45.1%
1970	1,126		6.4%
1980	1,450		28.8%
1990	1,722		18.8%
2000	1,813		5.3%
2010	1,700		−6.2%
2020	1,555		−8.5%
U.S. Decennial Census

=== 2020 census ===
As of the 2020 census, Douglass had a population of 1,555 people, including 595 households and 393 families. The median age was 35.4 years. 31.0% of residents were under the age of 18, 7.3% were from 18 to 24, 22.8% were from 25 to 44, 23.1% were from 45 to 64, and 15.8% were 65 years of age or older. For every 100 females, there were 101.4 males, and for every 100 females age 18 and over, there were 96.2 males.

The population density was 1,464.2 per square mile (565.3/km^{2}). There were 680 housing units at an average density of 640.3 per square mile (247.2/km^{2}), of which 12.5% were vacant. The homeowner vacancy rate was 1.8% and the rental vacancy rate was 11.3%. 0.0% of residents lived in urban areas, while 100.0% lived in rural areas.

Of the 595 households, 36.1% had children under the age of 18 living in them. 50.9% were married-couple households, 19.8% were households with a male householder and no spouse or partner present, and 24.5% were households with a female householder and no spouse or partner present. About 29.6% of households consisted of individuals, and 13.4% had someone living alone who was 65 years of age or older.

Non-Hispanic white residents accounted for 88.42% of the population.

Racial composition as of the 2020 census
Race	Number	Percent
White	1,402	90.2%
Black or African American	5	0.3%
American Indian and Alaska Native	24	1.5%
Asian	17	1.1%
Native Hawaiian and Other Pacific Islander	0	0.0%
Some other race	8	0.5%
Two or more races	99	6.4%
Hispanic or Latino (of any race)	57	3.7%

=== Demographic estimates ===
The average household size was 2.7 and the average family size was 3.5. The percent of those with a bachelor's degree or higher was estimated to be 17.8% of the population.

=== Income and poverty ===
The 2016–2020 5-year American Community Survey estimates show that the median household income was $56,125 (with a margin of error of +/- $7,204) and the median family income was $72,069 (+/- $3,629). Males had a median income of $47,583 (+/- $9,242) versus $23,250 (+/- $6,114) for females. The median income for those above 16 years old was $35,850 (+/- $9,894). Approximately, 5.5% of families and 9.3% of the population were below the poverty line, including 10.2% of those under the age of 18 and 4.4% of those ages 65 or over.

=== 2010 census ===
As of the census of 2010, there were 1,700 people, 625 households, and 452 families living in the city. The population density was 1,574.1 inhabitants per square mile (607.8/km^{2}). There were 689 housing units at an average density of 638.0 per square mile (246.3/km^{2}). The racial makeup of the city was 96.6% white, 0.4% African American, 1.1% Native American, 0.5% Asian, and 1.5% from two or more races. Hispanic or Latino of any race were 2.2% of the population.

There were 625 households, of which 40.0% had children under the age of 18 living with them, 52.8% were married couples living together, 13.1% had a female householder with no husband present, 6.4% had a male householder with no wife present, and 27.7% were non-families. 24.5% of all households were made up of individuals, and 11.3% had someone living alone who was 65 years of age or older. The average household size was 2.68 and the average family size was 3.18.

The median age in the city was 33.6 years. 29.9% of residents were under the age of 18; 8.7% were between the ages of 18 and 24; 25.8% were from 25 to 44; 23.1% were from 45 to 64; and 12.3% were 65 years of age or older. The gender makeup of the city was 48.8% male and 51.2% female.

=== 2000 census ===
As of the census of 2000, there were 1,813 people, 658 households, and 492 families living in the city. The population density was 2,198.4 inhabitants per square mile (848.8/km^{2}). There were 733 housing units at an average density of 888.8 per square mile (343.2/km^{2}). The racial makeup of the city was 96.25% white, 0.28% African American, 1.60% Native American, 0.22% Asian, 0.50% from other races, and 1.16% from two or more races. Hispanic or Latino of any race were 1.65% of the population.

There were 658 households, out of which 40.0% had children under the age of 18 living with them, 58.2% were married couples living together, 11.9% had a female householder with no husband present, and 25.1% were non-families. 21.1% of all households were made up of individuals, and 9.3% had someone living alone who was 65 years of age or older. The average household size was 2.67 and the average family size was 3.13.

In the city, the population was spread out, with 30.5% under the age of 18, 9.3% from 18 to 24, 29.1% from 25 to 44, 16.4% from 45 to 64, and 14.7% who were 65 years of age or older. The median age was 33 years. For every 100 females, there were 91.0 males. For every 100 females age 18 and over, there were 90.9 males.

The median income for a household in the city was $40,833, and the median income for a family was $49,875. Males had a median income of $37,000 versus $25,938 for females. The per capita income for the city was $17,965. About 4.5% of families and 6.1% of the population were below the poverty line, including 6.7% of those under age 18 and 7.0% of those age 65 or over.

== Education ==
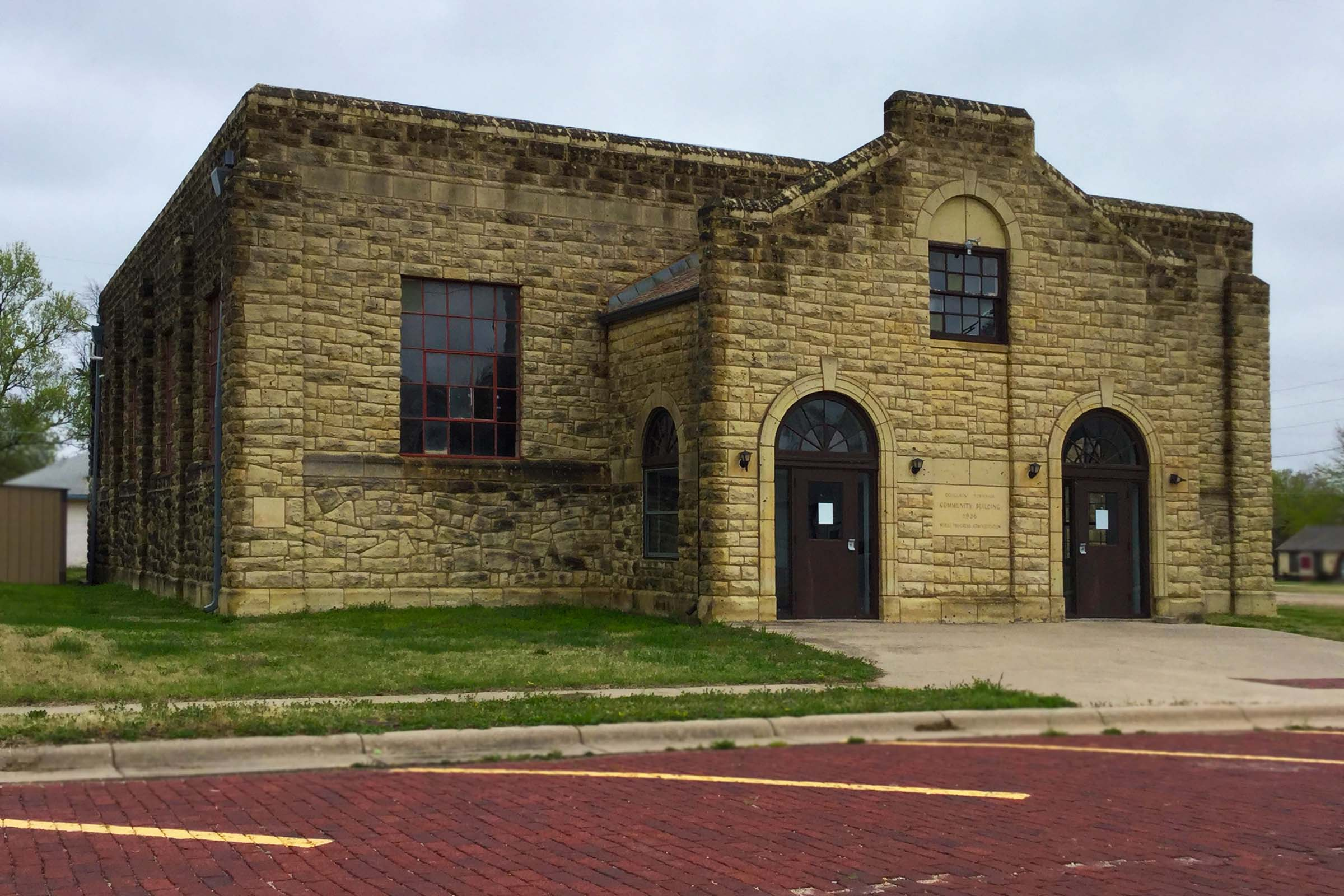
Douglass Township Community Building (2017)

The community is served by Douglass USD 396 public school district.

== Notable people ==
- Monty Beisel (b1978), football linebacker in NFL.
- William Couch (1850–1890), leader of the Oklahoma Boomer Movement and as the first provisional mayor of what became Oklahoma City.
- James Durham (1881–1949), pitcher in Major League Baseball.
- Phyllis Haver (1899–1960), actress during silent film era.
- George Hill (1895–1934), film director and cinematographer during silent film era.

== See also ==
- National Register of Historic Places listings in Butler County, Kansas
  - Douglass Township Community Building
- Extreme Makeover: Home Edition (season 3)
