= Beaumont High School =

Beaumont High School may refer to:

== United States ==
- Beaumont High School (Beaumont, California), a public high school in Beaumont, California
- Beaumont School (Ohio), a Catholic, all-girl high school in Cleveland Heights, Ohio
- Beaumont High School (St. Louis), a public high school in St. Louis, Missouri
- Beaumont High School (Beaumont, Texas) a former high school in Beaumont, Texas

== Canada ==
- Beaumont Composite High School, Beaumont, Alberta

== See also ==
- Beaumont Independent School District, Beaumont, Texas
