= Augusta, Kansas =

City in Butler County, Kansas

- City
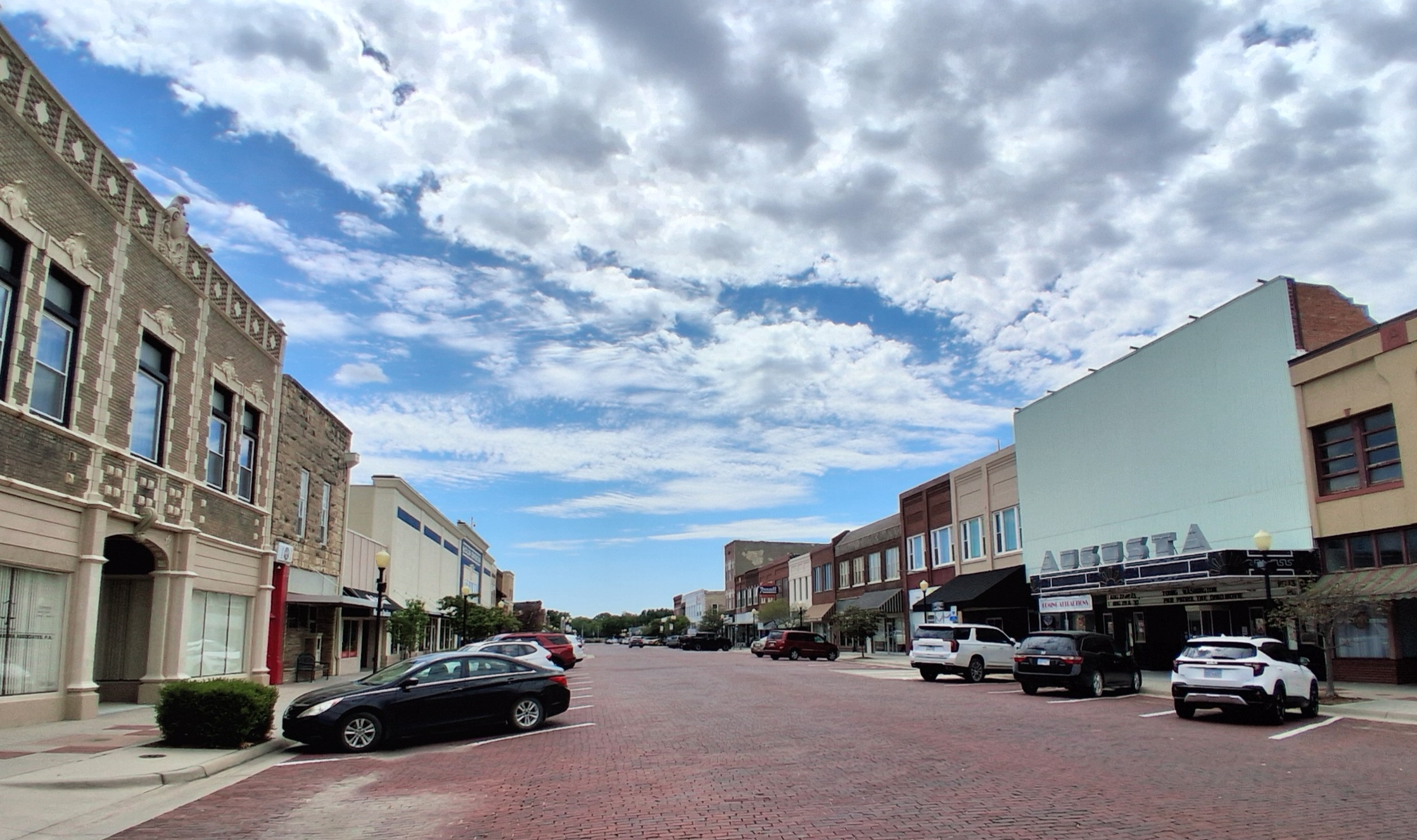
- Downtown Augusta in 2026

- Flag

- Location within Butler County and Kansas

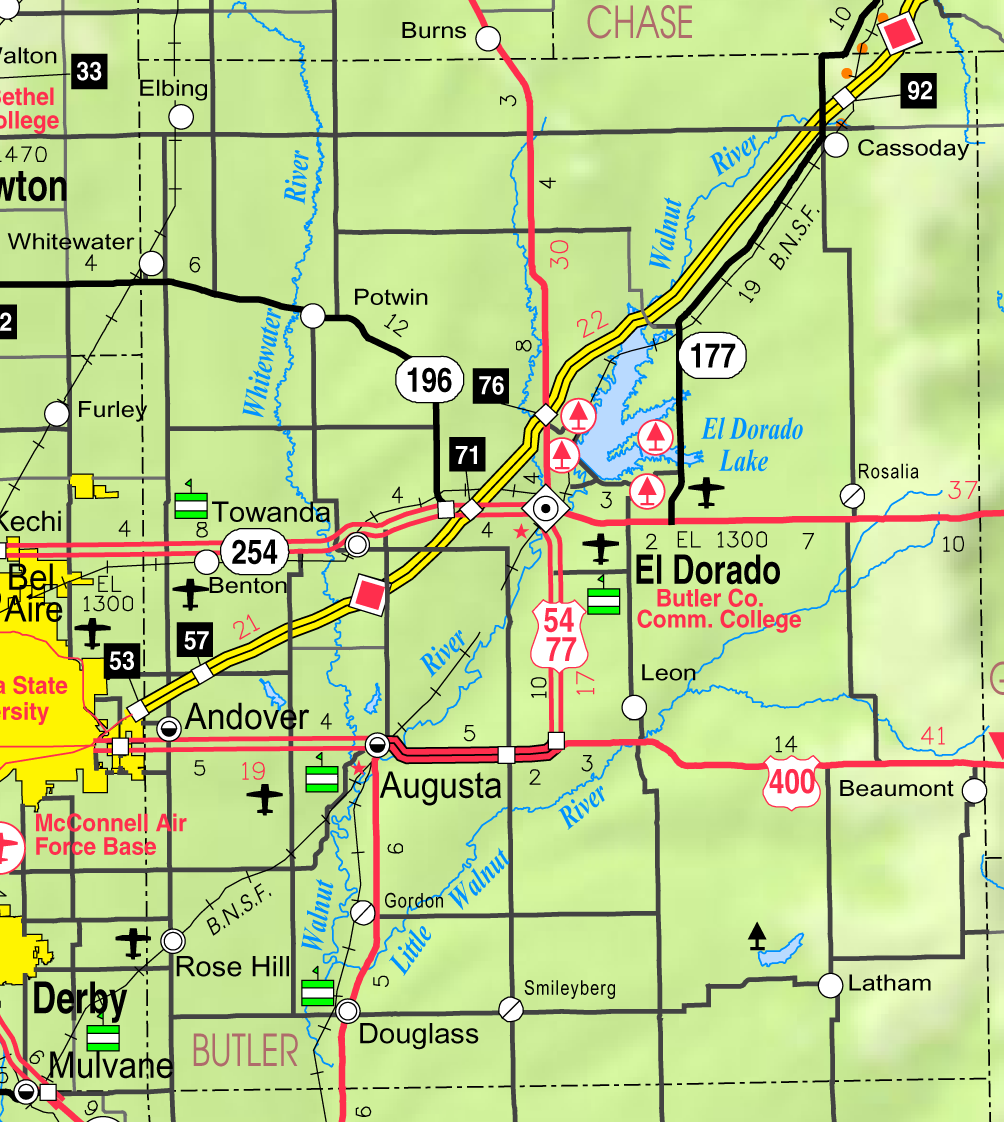
- KDOT map of Butler County (legend)
- Coordinates: 37°41′40″N 96°58′23″W
- Country: United States
- State: Kansas
- County: Butler
- Founded: 1868
- Incorporated: 1871
- Named for: Augusta James

Government
  - Mayor: Mike Rawlings
  - City Manager: Josh Shaw

Area
  - Total: 4.87 sq mi (12.62 km^{2})
  - Land: 4.24 sq mi (10.99 km^{2})
  - Water: 0.63 sq mi (1.64 km^{2})
- Elevation: 1,283 ft (391 m)

Population (2020)
  - Total: 9,256
  - Density: 2,181/sq mi (842.2/km^{2})
- Time zone: UTC-6 (CST)
  - Summer (DST): UTC-5 (CDT)
- ZIP Code: 67010
- Area code: 316
- FIPS code: 20-03300
- GNIS ID: 485543
- Website: augustaks.org

Augusta is a city in Butler County, Kansas, United States. As of the 2020 census, the population of the city was 9,256. It is located east of Wichita along U.S. Route 54 / 400 highway.

== History ==
=== 19th century ===
The confluence of the Whitewater River and the Walnut River was originally inhabited by Osage people, who found the land ideal for hunting and fishing.

In 1868, C. N. James settled in the area and built a log cabin to serve also as a general store and trading post. Around that same time, a post office was established in the settlement, and as the first postmaster, C. N. James named the post office and the town in honor of his wife, Augusta James.

In 1877, the Florence, El Dorado, and Walnut Valley Railroad Company built a branch line from Florence to El Dorado. In 1881 it was extended to Douglass, and later to Arkansas City. The rail line was leased and operated by the Atchison, Topeka and Santa Fe Railway. Service from Florence to El Dorado was abandoned in 1942. The original branch line connected Florence, Burns, De Graff, El Dorado, Augusta, Douglass, Rock, Akron, Winfield, Arkansas City. In 2020, the Santa Fe (now BNSF) still maintains tracks through Augusta at the 301 E. Fifth St. headquarters, a brick depot constructed in 1916–1917. The St. Louis & San Francisco (Frisco) Railroad established a depot in Augusta in 1880, serving both passengers and freight. Passenger service ended in 1960.

=== 20th century ===
The discovery of oil near Augusta in 1914, and soon elsewhere in Butler County, led to the doubling of the population of Augusta between 1910 and 1920. Oil drilling and refining became a major source of employment for many years. In 1916, L. L. Marcell founded the White Eagle Oil Company in Augusta. Other early refineries were the Walnut Refining Company and the Lakeside Refinery. In 1930, White Eagle was purchased by the Standard Oil Company of New York and was known as "Socony-Vacuum" for many years, then renamed Mobil in 1966.

=== 21st century ===
In 2010, the Keystone-Cushing Pipeline (Phase II) was constructed about 1.5 miles west of Augusta, north to south through Butler County, with much controversy over tax exemption and environmental concerns (if a leak ever occurs).

== Geography ==
Augusta is located at the confluence of the Walnut and Whitewater Rivers. It is located along the western edge of Butler County.

According to the United States Census Bureau, the city has a total area of 4.75 square miles (12.30 km^{2}), of which 4.23 square miles (10.96 km^{2}) is land and 0.52 square miles (1.35 km^{2}) is water.

=== Climate ===
The climate in this area is characterized by hot, humid summers and generally mild to cool winters. According to the Köppen Climate Classification system, Augusta has a humid subtropical climate, abbreviated "Cfa" on climate maps.

== Demographics ==
Historical population
Census	Pop.	Note	%±
1880	922		—
1890	1,343		45.7%
1900	1,197		−10.9%
1910	1,235		3.2%
1920	4,219		241.6%
1930	4,033		−4.4%
1940	3,821		−5.3%
1950	4,483		17.3%
1960	6,434		43.5%
1970	5,977		−7.1%
1980	6,968		16.6%
1990	7,876		13.0%
2000	8,423		6.9%
2010	9,274		10.1%
2020	9,256		−0.2%
2023 (est.)	9,245		−0.1%
U.S. Decennial Census; 2010-2020

=== 2020 census ===
As of the 2020 census, Augusta had a population of 9,256, with 3,670 households and 2,423 families. The population density was 2,182.0 inhabitants per square mile (842.5/km^{2}), and there were 4,002 housing units at an average density of 943.4 per square mile (364.3/km^{2}). 99.6% of residents lived in urban areas and 0.4% lived in rural areas.

Of the 3,670 households, 33.1% had children under the age of 18 living in them. Of all households, 48.3% were married-couple households, 18.4% were households with a male householder and no spouse or partner present, and 27.4% were households with a female householder and no spouse or partner present. About 29.6% of all households were made up of individuals and 14.2% had someone living alone who was 65 years of age or older. The average household size was 2.5 and the average family size was 2.9.

The median age was 37.7 years. 26.4% of residents were under the age of 18, 7.8% were from 18 to 24, 25.0% were from 25 to 44, 22.7% were from 45 to 64, and 18.1% were 65 years of age or older. For every 100 females, there were 104.6 males, and for every 100 females age 18 and over, there were 109.5 males.

There were 4,002 housing units, of which 8.3% were vacant. The homeowner vacancy rate was 1.4% and the rental vacancy rate was 7.0%.

Racial composition as of the 2020 census
Race	Number	Percent
White	8,183	88.4%
Black or African American	47	0.5%
American Indian and Alaska Native	85	0.9%
Asian	51	0.6%
Native Hawaiian and Other Pacific Islander	5	0.1%
Some other race	133	1.4%
Two or more races	752	8.1%
Hispanic or Latino (of any race)	514	5.6%

Non-Hispanic white residents accounted for 86.11% of the population.

=== 2010 census ===
As of the census of 2010, there were 9,274 people, 3,669 households, and 2,448 families living in the city. The population density was 2,192.4 inhabitants per square mile (846.5/km^{2}). There were 3,951 housing units at an average density of 934.0 per square mile (360.6/km^{2}). The racial makeup of the city was 94.2% White, 0.4% African American, 1.3% Native American, 0.6% Asian, 0.1% Pacific Islander, 1.1% from other races, and 2.3% from two or more races. Hispanic or Latino of any race were 4% of the population.

There were 3,669 households, of which 35.1% had children under the age of 18 living with them, 50.1% were married couples living together, 12.4% had a female householder with no husband present, 4.2% had a male householder with no wife present, and 33.3% were non-families. 29.3% of all households were made up of individuals, and 14.9% had someone living alone who was 65 years of age or older. The average household size was 2.50 and the average family size was 3.10.

The median age in the city was 35.7 years. 27.9% of residents were under the age of 18; 8.4% were between the ages of 18 and 24; 25% were from 25 to 44; 23.2% were from 45 to 64; and 15.6% were 65 years of age or older. The gender makeup of the city was 47.2% male and 52.8% female.

=== Demographic estimates ===
The percent of residents age 25 and older with a bachelor's degree or higher was estimated at 15.5% in the 2016–2020 American Community Survey 5-year estimates.

=== Income and poverty ===
The 2016–2020 5-year American Community Survey estimates show that the median household income was $52,274 (with a margin of error of +/- $5,044) and the median family income was $64,386 (+/- $7,473). Males had a median income of $40,083 (+/- $9,827) versus $25,148 (+/- $8,132) for females. The median income for those above 16 years old was $30,611 (+/- $3,528). Approximately, 8.4% of families and 8.5% of the population were below the poverty line, including 8.5% of those under the age of 18 and 5.2% of those ages 65 or over.

== Education ==
The community is served by Augusta USD 402 public school district.

== Landmarks ==
The Augusta Theater, now home to the Augusta Arts Council, is a classic example of Art Deco. Augusta is also home to the Kansas Museum of Military History (formerly Augusta Air Museum). The Augusta Historical Museum and the C.N. James Log Cabin are on the National Register of Historic Places. Also Henry's Sculpture Hill is located outside the cities limit. Augusta does offer an airport called the Augusta Municipal Airport.

== Media ==
Augusta is home to the Butler County Times-Gazette (formerly various local newspaper companies including the Augusta Gazette, Andover American, and El Dorado Times), a tri-weekly newspaper covering Augusta and neighboring towns.

== Notable people ==
- Madelyn Dunham — banker, grandmother of Barack Obama
- Edward R. Weidlein (1887–1983) — chemist
- Bob Whittaker — U.S. Representative; resident of Augusta
- Matt Beat — YouTuber

== See also ==
- National Register of Historic Places listings in Butler County, Kansas
  - C. N. James Cabin
  - Loomis–Parry Residence
