= Beaumont Hospital =

Beaumont Hospital may refer to:

- Beaumont Hospital, Dublin an 820-bed public hospital in the Republic of Ireland, founded in 1987
- William Beaumont Army Medical Center a 150+ bed US Army medical center in El Paso, Texas, United States founded in 1921
- Beaumont Health, a not-for-profit operator of hospitals in southeast Michigan
  - Beaumont Hospital, Dearborn a hospital in Dearborn, Michigan, United States
  - Beaumont Hospital, Farmington Hills a hospital in Farmington Hills, Michigan, United States
  - Beaumont Hospital, Grosse Pointe a 280-bed hospital in Grosse Pointe, Michigan, United States
  - Beaumont Hospital, Royal Oak a 1070-bed hospital in Royal Oak, Michigan, United States founded in 1955
  - Beaumont Hospital, Taylor a hospital in Taylor, Michigan, United States
  - Beaumont Hospital, Trenton a hospital in Trenton, Michigan, United States
  - Beaumont Hospital, Troy a 346-bed hospital in Troy, Michigan, United States
  - Beaumont Hospital, Wayne a hospital in Wayne, Michigan, United States
- BMI The Beaumont Hospital in Bolton
