= De Graff, Kansas =

Unincorporated community in Butler County, Kansas

- Unincorporated community
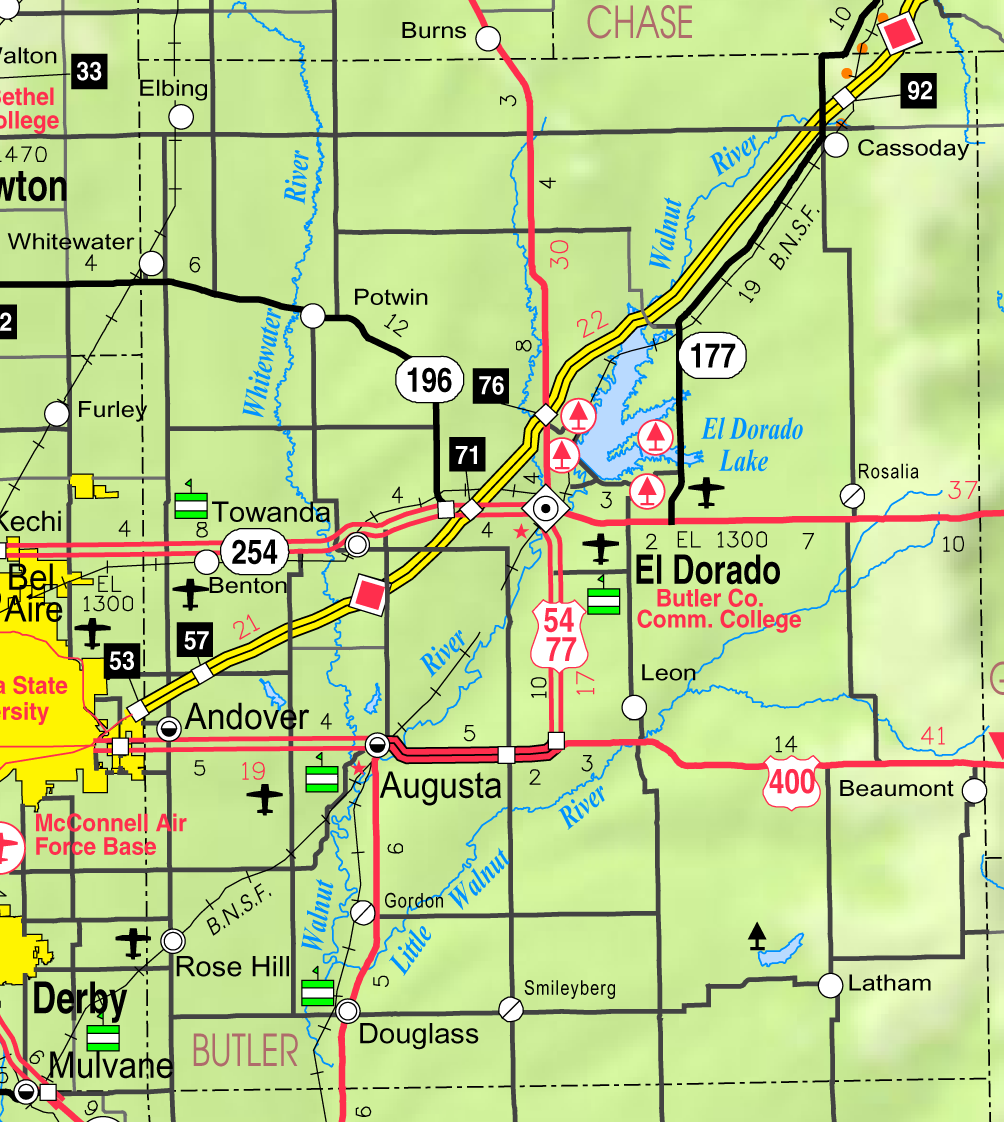
- KDOT map of Butler County (legend)

- Location within Kansas Location within the United States
- Coordinates: 37°58′52″N 96°51′46″W
- Country: United States
- State: Kansas
- County: Butler
- Township: Lincoln
- Elevation: 1,401 ft (427 m)
- Time zone: UTC-6 (CST)
  - Summer (DST): UTC-5 (CDT)
- Area code: 620
- FIPS code: 20-17325
- GNIS ID: 474396

De Graff is an unincorporated community in Butler County, Kansas, United States. It is located on U.S. Route 77, approximately 7.7 miles (12.4 km) north of I-35 (Kansas Turnpike)

== History ==
In 1877, the Florence, El Dorado, and Walnut Valley Railroad Company built a branch line from Florence to El Dorado, and a station called De Graff was built. In 1881, the rail line was extended to Douglass, then later to Arkansas City. The line was leased and operated by the Atchison, Topeka and Santa Fe Railway. The line from Florence] through Burns to El Dorado was abandoned in 1942. The original branch line connected Florence through El Dorado to Arkansas City.

De Graff was founded around a train station in 1877, then stagnated after the railroad was abandoned in 1942. De Graff had a post office from 1887 until 1942.

== Climate ==
The climate in this area is characterized by hot, humid summers and generally mild to cool winters. According to the Köppen Climate Classification system, De Graff has a humid subtropical climate, abbreviated "Cfa" on climate maps.

== Education ==
The community is served by El Dorado USD 490 public school district.

== Infrastructure ==
U.S. Route 77 highway runs north–south on the east side of De Graff, and follows roughly parallel to the old railway.

== See also ==
- National Register of Historic Places listings in Butler County, Kansas
