= Augusta Theater =

- U.S. National Register of Historic Places
- The Augusta Theater in 2021

- Location within Kansas Location within the United States
- Location: 525 State St. Augusta, Kansas
- Coordinates: 37°40′36.97″N 96°59′21.86″W
- Built: c. 1935
- Architects: L. P. Larsen; Lite Craft Neon Co.; Robert Boller; Dietz Lusk
- Architectural style: Art Deco
- NRHP reference No.: 90001577
- Added to NRHP: October 31, 1990

The Augusta Theater is a movie palace theater located in the city of Augusta, Kansas, which was built in about 1935. Designed by architect L. P. Larsen, the walls are decorated with large murals depicting classical scenes. It was the first theater to use neon lighting exclusively. Considered to be a landmark of the Art Deco era, it became home of the Augusta Arts Council.

In 1990, the Augusta Arts Council planned to proceed with renovations including restoration of the building's historic facade.
