= Beaumont (given name) =

Beaumont is a masculine given name that may refer to the following notable people:

- Beaumont Asquith (1910–1977), English football player
- Beaumont Brenan (died 1761), Irish poet and playwright
- Beaumont Cranfield (1872–1909), English professional cricketer
- Beaumont Hannant, British musician, producer and DJ
- Beaumont Jarrett (1855–1905), English football player
- Beaumont Newhall (1908–1993), curator, art historian, writer, and photographer
- Beaumont Smith (1885–1950), Australian film director, producer and exhibitor
