= Bloomington Township, Kansas =

Bloomington Township Butler County, Kansas
- Township
- Location within Butler County

- Location within Kansas
- Coordinates: 37°36′25″N 096°52′51″W
- Country: United States
- State: Kansas
- County: Butler

Area
  - Total: 36.01 sq mi (93.26 km^{2})
  - Land: 36.01 sq mi (93.26 km^{2})
  - Water: 0 sq mi (0 km^{2}) 0%
- Elevation: 1,283 ft (391 m)

Population (2020)
  - Total: 492
  - Density: 13.7/sq mi (5.28/km^{2})
- Time zone: UTC-6 (CST)
  - Summer (DST): UTC-5 (CDT)
- FIPS code: 20-07500
- GNIS ID: 474826
- Website: County website

Bloomington Township is a township in Butler County, Kansas. As of the 2020 census, its population was 492.

== History ==
Bloomington Township was established in 1872.

== Geography ==
Bloomington Township covers an area of 36.01 square miles (93.3 km^{2}) and contains no incorporated settlements. According to the USGS, there is one cemetery: Bogle.

The Hickory Creek stream runs through the township.
