= Beaumont St. Louis and San Francisco Railroad Water Tank =

- U.S. National Register of Historic Places
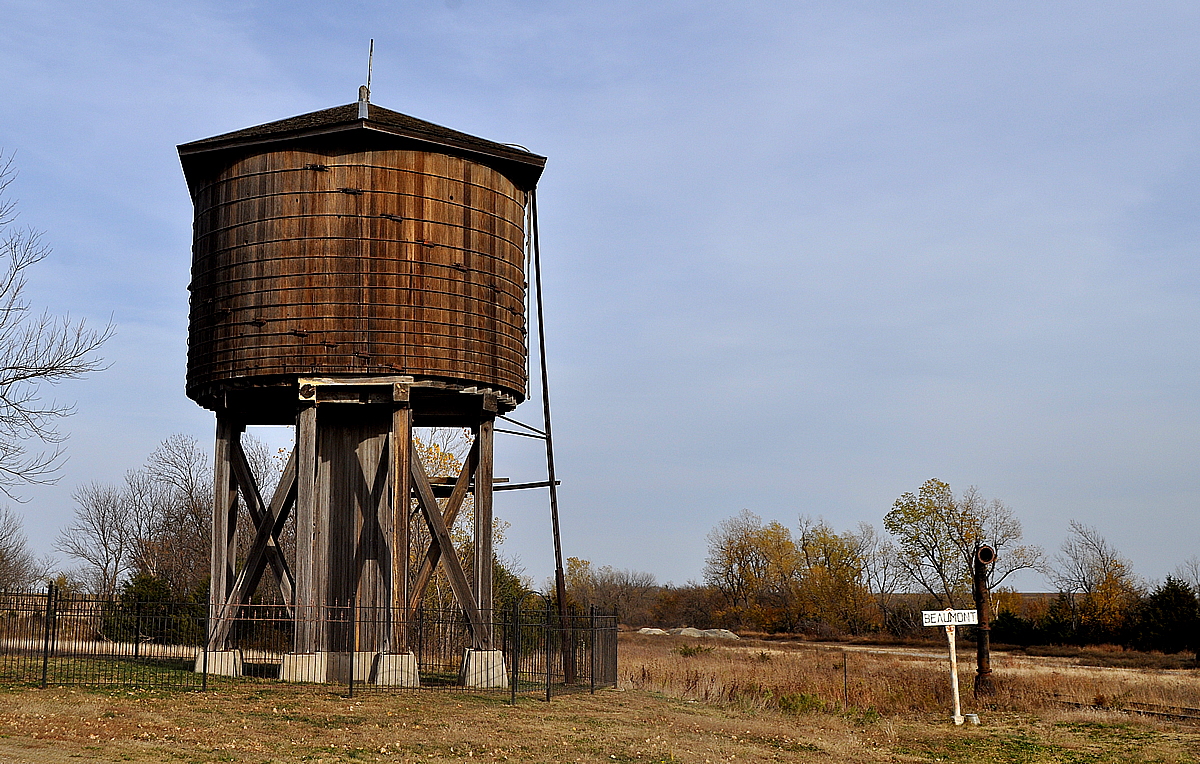
- Beaumont Railroad Water Tank

- Location within Kansas Location within the United States
- Location: Junction of Third and D Streets, Beaumont, Kansas
- Coordinates: 37°39′18.38″N 96°31′56.08″W
- Built: 1875
- Architect: St. Louis, Wichita & Western Railway
- NRHP reference No.: 93000843
- Added to NRHP: August 19, 1993

The Beaumont St. Louis and San Francisco Railroad Water Tank is a railroad water tank or water tower constructed in 1875, in Beaumont, Kansas. It served the St. Louis, Wichita & Western Railway, and was used to refill the boilers of steam locomotives on that line. It was added to the National Register of Historic Places in 1993. A sign at the site claims it was the last water tank used in regular railway operations in the United States.

The Beaumont tower became the place where all passing steam trains took on their water and fuel. The nearby Beaumont St. Louis and San Francisco Railroad Retention Pond held the water supply that was piped to the water tank alongside the tracks where steam engines were re-supplied. In the era of steam-powered locomotives, watering stations like this one were essential to railroad transportation.

The tower is made from sawcut and milled cypress staves bound by steel bands and has a fifty thousand gallon capacity. The tank is covered by a six-sided shingle roof and is elevated forty feet into the air by eight wooden piers on concrete footings.

The eventual adoption of diesel-powered locomotives eliminated the need for large amounts of water. Eventually, the tower fell into disuse by the railroad but it remained vital to the Beaumont community. The pumping station was kept active and pipe was laid throughout the town for potable water supply. The tower continued to hold water and was in limited use until 1988.

In 1989, residents of Beaumont formed the "Friends of the Beaumont Water Tower" organization in efforts to preserve the tower. The group succeeded in acquiring the tower from the Burlington Northern Railroad Company in 1996, made repairs to the wooden structure, and took measures to preserve it from environmental damage. In 1998 the concrete foundations were strengthened. The community now holds a yearly water tower festival to raise funds and awareness for ongoing maintenance and preservation efforts.

== See also ==
- National Register of Historic Places listings in Butler County, Kansas
