= Beaumont Park (disambiguation) =

Beaumont Park may refer to:

- Beaumont Park, a suburb of Huddersfield in West Yorkshire, England.
- Beaumont Park, Tyne and Wear, a section of Whitley Bay, Tyne & Wear, England.
- Beaumont Provincial Park, a provincial park near Fraser Lake, British Columbia, Canada.
- Beaumont-Hamel Newfoundland Memorial Park, a memorial site in France dedicated to Dominion of Newfoundland forces from World War I.
- Beaumont Park, a park in Oakland, California.
- Beaumont Botanical Gardens, also known as Tyrell Park, in Beaumont, Texas.
- Beaumont Park, a park in Greenbank, Plymouth, England.
- Beaumont Park Stadium, a speedway stadium in Leicester, England
