= Yingling Brothers Auto Company =

- U.S. National Register of Historic Places
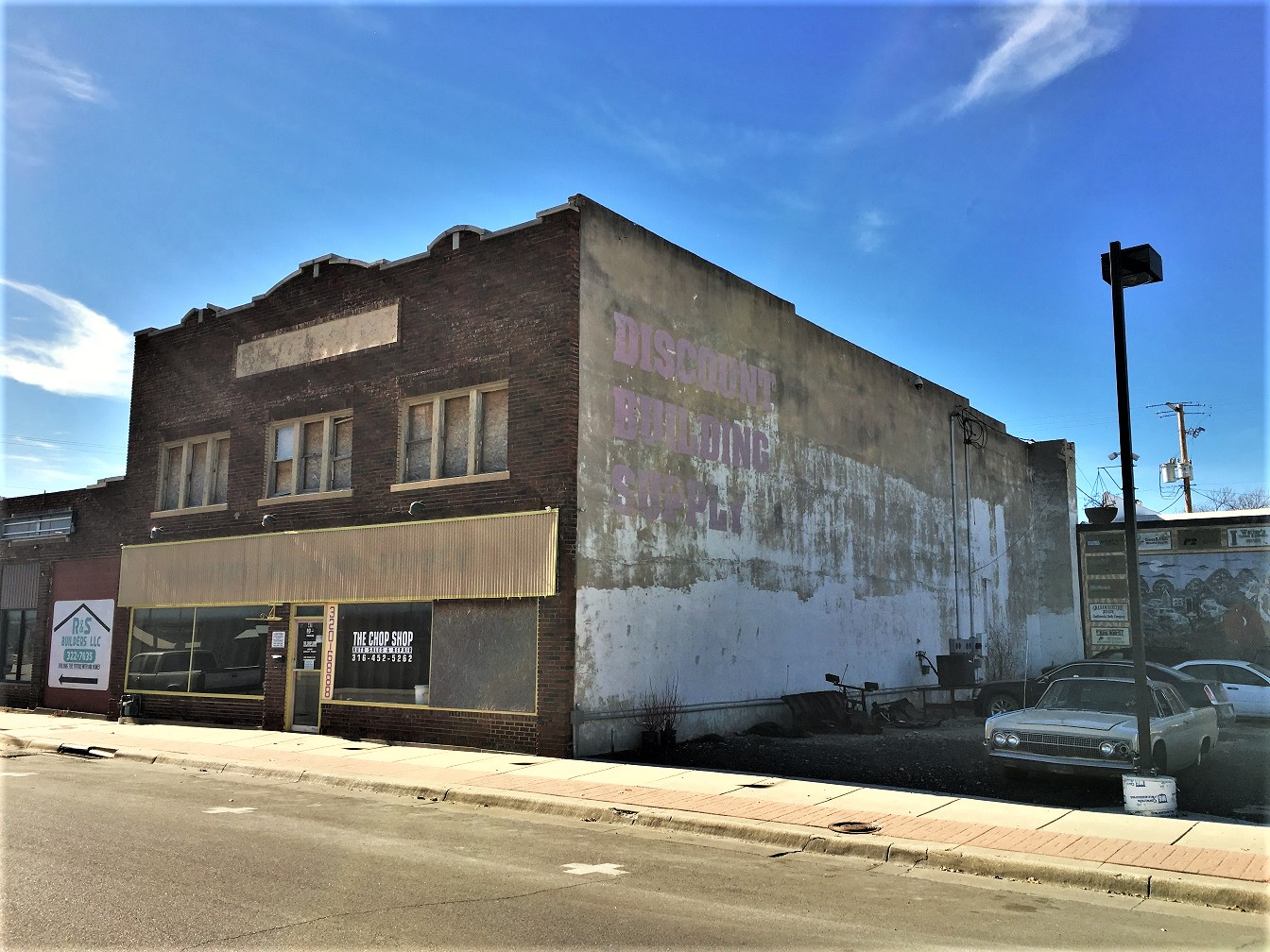
- Location: 411 S. Main St., El Dorado, Kansas
- Coordinates: 37°48′51″N 96°51′01″W
- Area: less than one acre
- Built: 1917
- Architectural style: Early Commercial
- MPS: Roadside Kansas MPS
- NRHP reference No.: 11000409
- Added to NRHP: July 5, 2011

The Yingling Brothers Auto Company, at 411 S. Main St. in El Dorado, Kansas, was built in 1917. It was listed on the National Register of Historic Places in 2011.

It is a two-story brick Early Commercial-style building on a concrete foundation.
