= Beaumont's Halt railway station =

Disused railway station in St. Albans Hertfordshire

Beaumont's Halt

General information
- Location: St Albans, Hertfordshire; England
- Coordinates: 51.7905°N 0.4064°W
- Grid reference: TL100114
- Platforms: 1

Other information
- Status: Disused

History
- Original company: Midland Railway
- Pre-grouping: Midland Railway
- Post-grouping: London, Midland and Scottish Railway

Key dates
- 9 August 1905: Opened
- 16 June 1947: Closed to passengers
- 1 July 1963: Closed to goods
Location

Beaumont's Halt railway station was in Hertfordshire, England from 1905 to 1963 on the Nickey Line.

== History ==
The station opened on 9 August 1905 by the Midland Railway. It was situated on the south side of a footpath that was between Hempstead Road and the B487. There was initially no shelter but a petition was raised in 1907 to provide one to all four stations in 1907. It was named after the nearby Beaumont Hall. The station closed to passengers on 16 June 1947 and closed to goods on 1 July 1963.

Preceding station	Disused railways	Following station
Redbourn; Line and station closed	Midland Railway; Nickey Line	Godwin's Halt; Line and station closed
