= Beaumont, Kansas =

Unincorporated community in Butler County, Kansas

- Unincorporated community and CDP
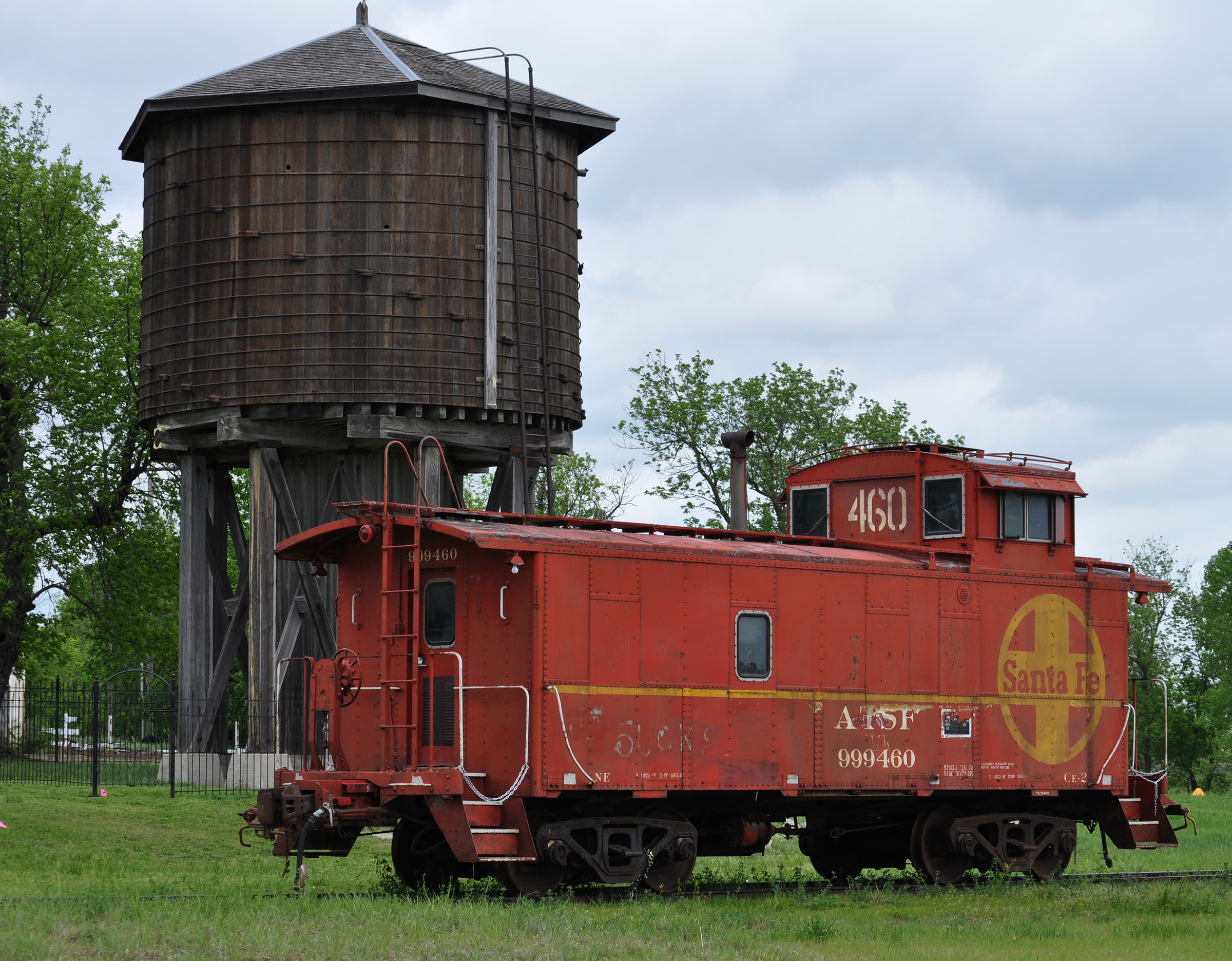
- Historic Beaumont water tower and Santa Fe caboose (2015)

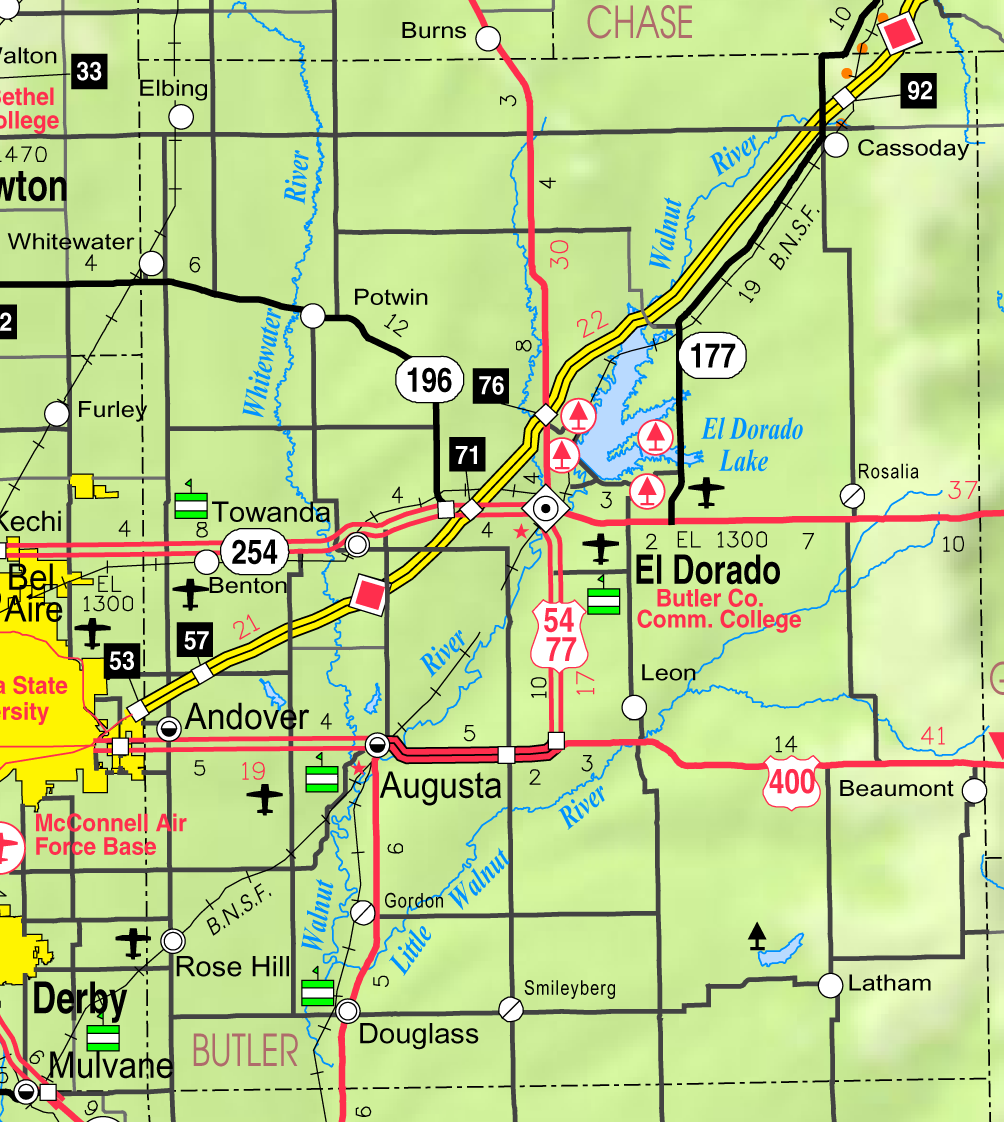
- KDOT map of Butler County (legend)

- Location within Kansas Location within the United States
- Coordinates: 37°39′29″N 96°31′58″W
- Country: United States
- State: Kansas
- County: Butler
- Elevation: 1,608 ft (490 m)

Population (2020)
  - Total: 36
- Time zone: UTC-6 (CST)
  - Summer (DST): UTC-5 (CDT)
- Area code: 620
- FIPS code: 20-04925
- GNIS ID: 474851

Beaumont is an unincorporated community and census-designated place (CDP) in Butler County, Kansas, United States. As of the 2020 census, the population was 36.

== History ==
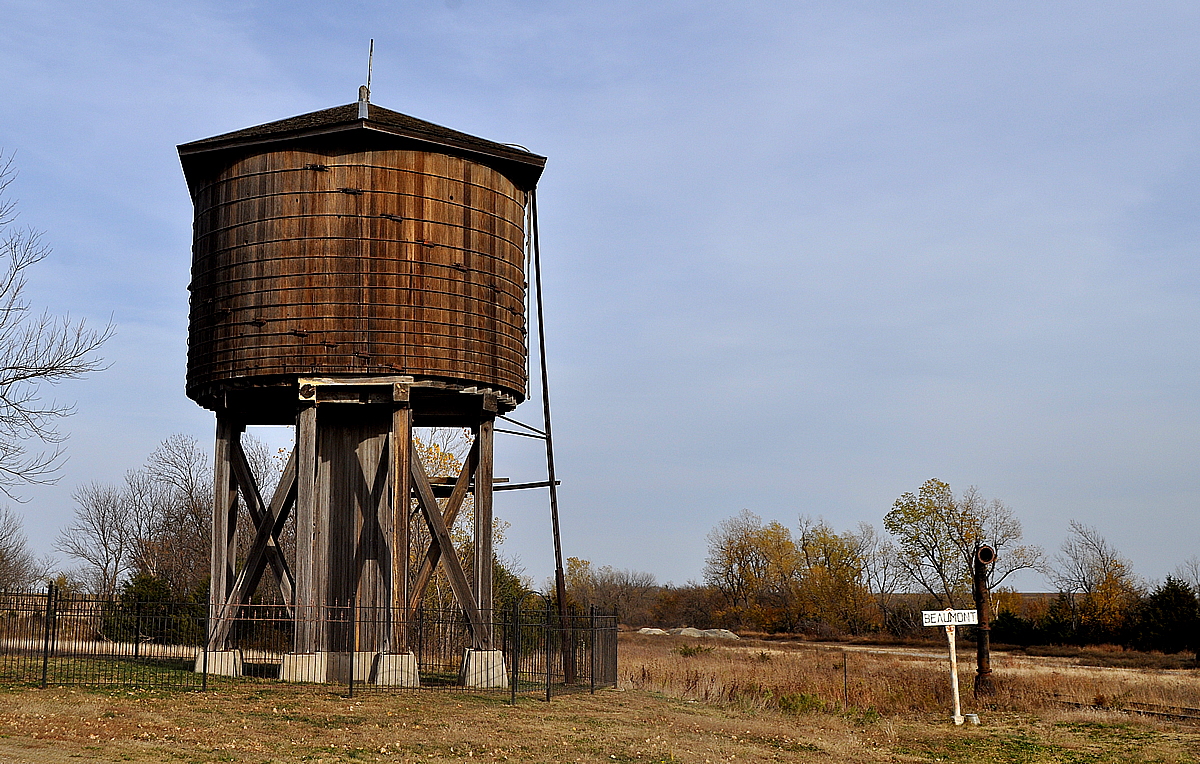
Beaumont Water Tower (2012)

The surrounding area is farmland, settled by ranchers and farmers before the Civil War. Homesteaders from Missouri, Iowa, Tennessee and other eastern states came because of an abundance of cheap land.

The town site was first a stop on the stagecoach route between Fredonia and Wichita. In 1879 Edwin and Emma Russell built the Summit Hotel, later renamed as the Beaumont Hotel. In 1885 the St. Louis and San Francisco Railroad, better known as the Frisco, established Beaumont as a railroad town. One line of tracks ran east and west, connecting St. Louis with Wichita. A spur was added later going south from Beaumont though Latham and on to the Oklahoma border. A roundhouse was built in 1890 across from the Summit Hotel, and employed 90 people. The water tower, built in 1885, stands across from the hotel and is on the National Register of Historic Places. Because of the rich bluestem grass, the area was used as staging area to ship cattle back east.

The railroad supported several businesses in Beaumont. These included a hardware store and lumber yard, as well as a pharmacy owned by the town's only physician and surgeon, Dr. William James Phillips. The population of Beaumont has never been large. In 1910 the population was 200. Today, fewer than 50 people live there.

A post office was opened in Beaumont on June 3, 1880, and remained in operation until it was discontinued on August 16, 1997.

The Beaumont St. Louis and San Francisco Railroad Water Tank in Beaumont is on the National Register of Historic Places.

Beaumont maintains a private airfield directly next to the town.

The community is featured in the storyline of the 1998 film "The Long Way Home" starring Jack Lemmon. However, the actual locations filmed were in British Columbia, Canada, and not in Kansas.

The town is also the site of NOAA Weather Radio station WWH-22, serving southeastern Kansas. The transmitter is located north of Beaumont and is maintained by National Weather Service Wichita, Kansas.

== Geography ==
The climate in this area is characterized by hot, humid summers and generally mild to cool winters. According to the Köppen Climate Classification system, Beaumont has a humid subtropical climate, abbreviated "Cfa" on climate maps.

== Demographics ==
Historical population
Census	Pop.	Note	%±
2020	36		—
U.S. Decennial Census

The 2020 United States census counted 36 people, 16 households, and 12 families in Beaumont. The population density was 65.0 per square mile (25.1/km^{2}). There were 28 housing units at an average density of 50.5 per square mile (19.5/km^{2}). The racial makeup was 91.67% (33) white or European American (91.67% non-Hispanic white), 0.0% (0) black or African-American, 5.56% (2) Native American or Alaska Native, 0.0% (0) Asian, 0.0% (0) Pacific Islander or Native Hawaiian, 0.0% (0) from other races, and 2.78% (1) from two or more races. Hispanic or Latino of any race was 0.0% (0) of the population.

Of the 16 households, 25.0% had children under the age of 18; 56.2% were married couples living together; 31.2% had a female householder with no spouse or partner present. 25.0% of households consisted of individuals and 6.2% had someone living alone who was 65 years of age or older. The percent of those with a bachelor's degree or higher was estimated to be 0.0% of the population.

16.7% of the population was under the age of 18, 11.1% from 18 to 24, 22.2% from 25 to 44, 16.7% from 45 to 64, and 33.3% who were 65 years of age or older. The median age was 49.0 years. For every 100 females, there were 80.0 males. For every 100 females ages 18 and older, there were 100.0 males.

== Education ==
The community is served by Bluestem USD 205 public school district.

== See also ==
- National Register of Historic Places listings in Butler County, Kansas
  - Beaumont St. Louis and San Francisco Railroad Water Tank
- Elk River Wind Project
