= RRV =

RRV may refer to:

- Basque Radical Rock (Spanish: Rock radikal vasco), a musical genre originating in the Basque Country
- Rapid response vehicle (disambiguation), multiple types of vehicle used by emergency services
- Resident Return Visa, types of visa issued by Australia, New Zealand and the United States
- Reweighted range voting, a type of proportional voting system
- Ridge Racer V, a 2000 arcade video game
- Rock Rendez-Vous, a nightclub in Lisbon, Portugal
- Road–rail vehicle (or rail-road vehicle), a vehicle capable of travelling on roads or railways
- Rose rosette emaravirus, a negative sense RNA virus that infects roses
- Ross River virus, a species of RNA virus native to Australia
- Royal Rifle Volunteers, a former regiment of the British Army
