= Schienen-Straßen-Omnibus =

Passenger transport vehicle

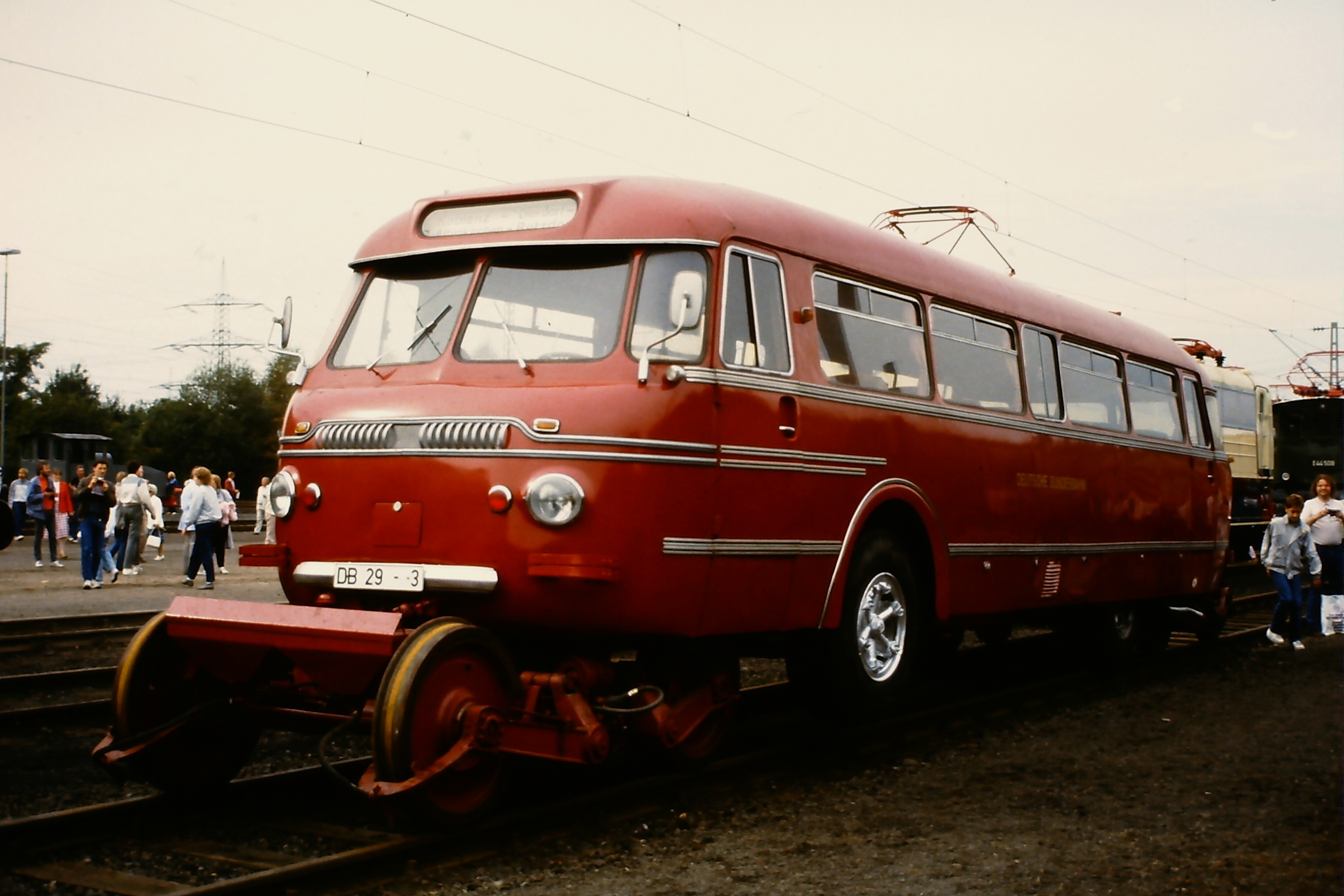
The rail-road omnibus in the Bochum-Dahlhausen Railway Museum

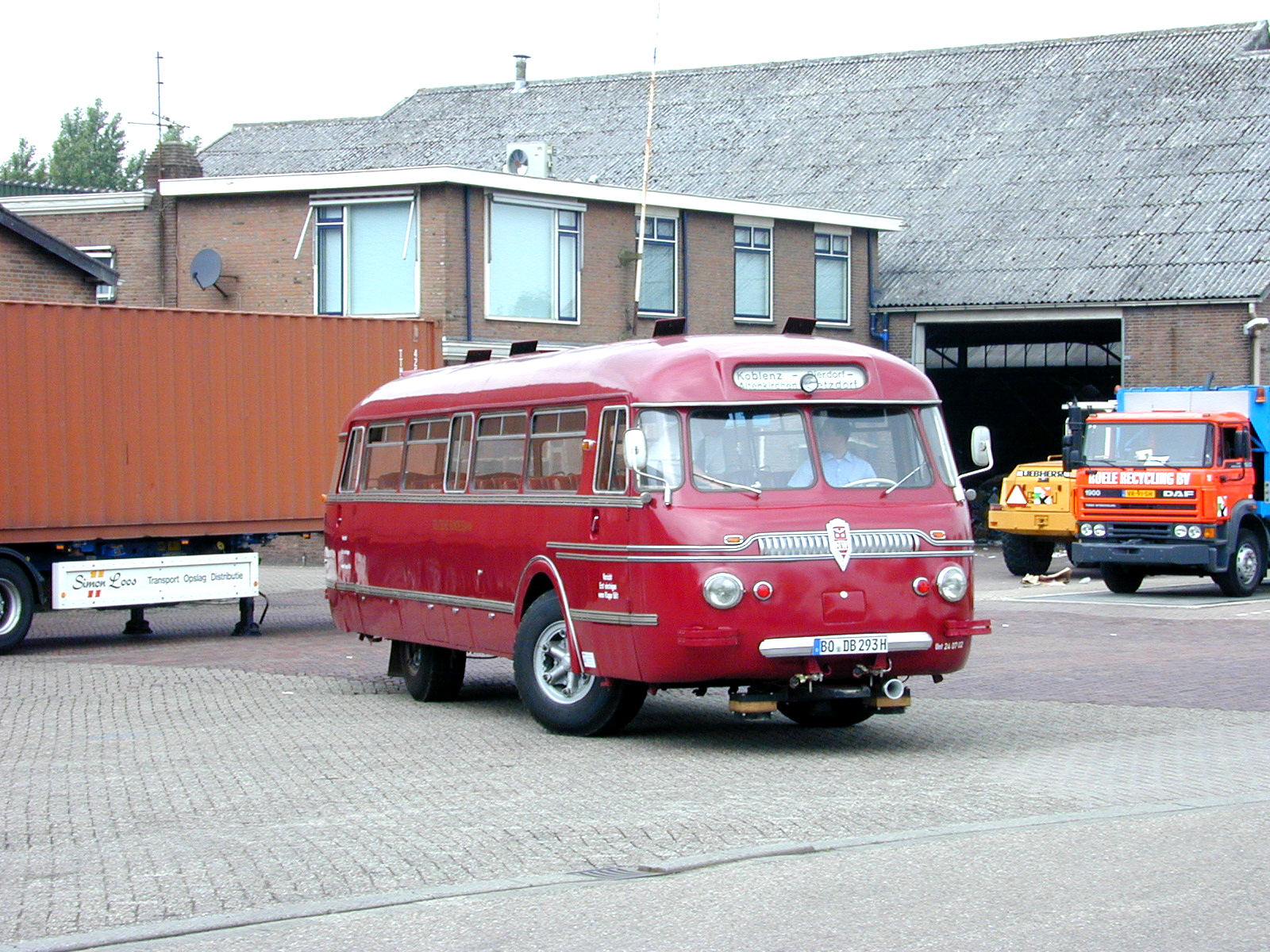
The museum vehicle on the road

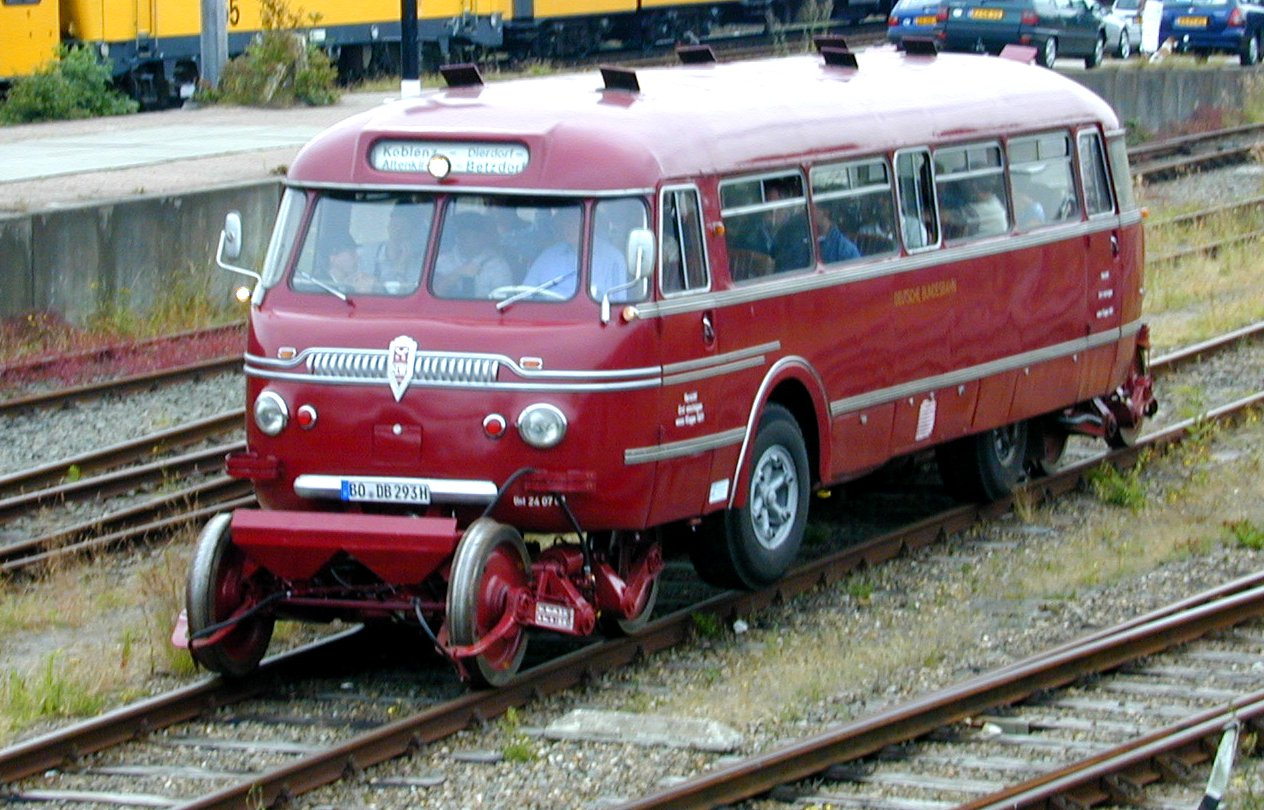
Schi-Stra-Bus

The Schienen-Straßen-Omnibus (lit. 'rails-street-omnibus' from German), also known as the "Schi-Stra-Bus", was a railroad bus for passenger traffic on railway lines and roads. The Deutsche Bundesbahn (DB) used it both as a railbus and as a bus in Germany.

== Description ==
The Schi-Stra-Bus is similar to a railbus; it is a special omnibus with all the equipment necessary for road traffic. The Schi-Stra-Bus was equipped with a diesel engine from Klöckner-Humboldt-Deutz with an output of 88 kilowatts (118 hp), enabling speeds of up to 80 km/h (50 mph) on the road and 120 km/h (75 mph) on rails. The vehicles had 43 seats and 15 to 24 standing places.

The car was a one-way vehicle but was equipped according to the regulations of rail traffic. It had doors on both sides, a train-compatible brake that acted on the track wagons, a safety drive circuit, and an emergency brake. To operate on railroad tracks, the bus was placed on two two-axle bases called "track wagons", and was outfitted with two hydraulic lifts, which served to lift the front and rear of the vehicles onto the track wagons and take them off. In front of the front axle and behind the rear axle was a bearing for the trolley pivot. A grooved track at street level was required for the positioning. While in rail mode, the front axle was completely raised off the ground, and the tires of the rear wheels were seated on the rails to provide drive. During the change to and from the track wagons, the passengers remained on the bus.

== Procurement ==
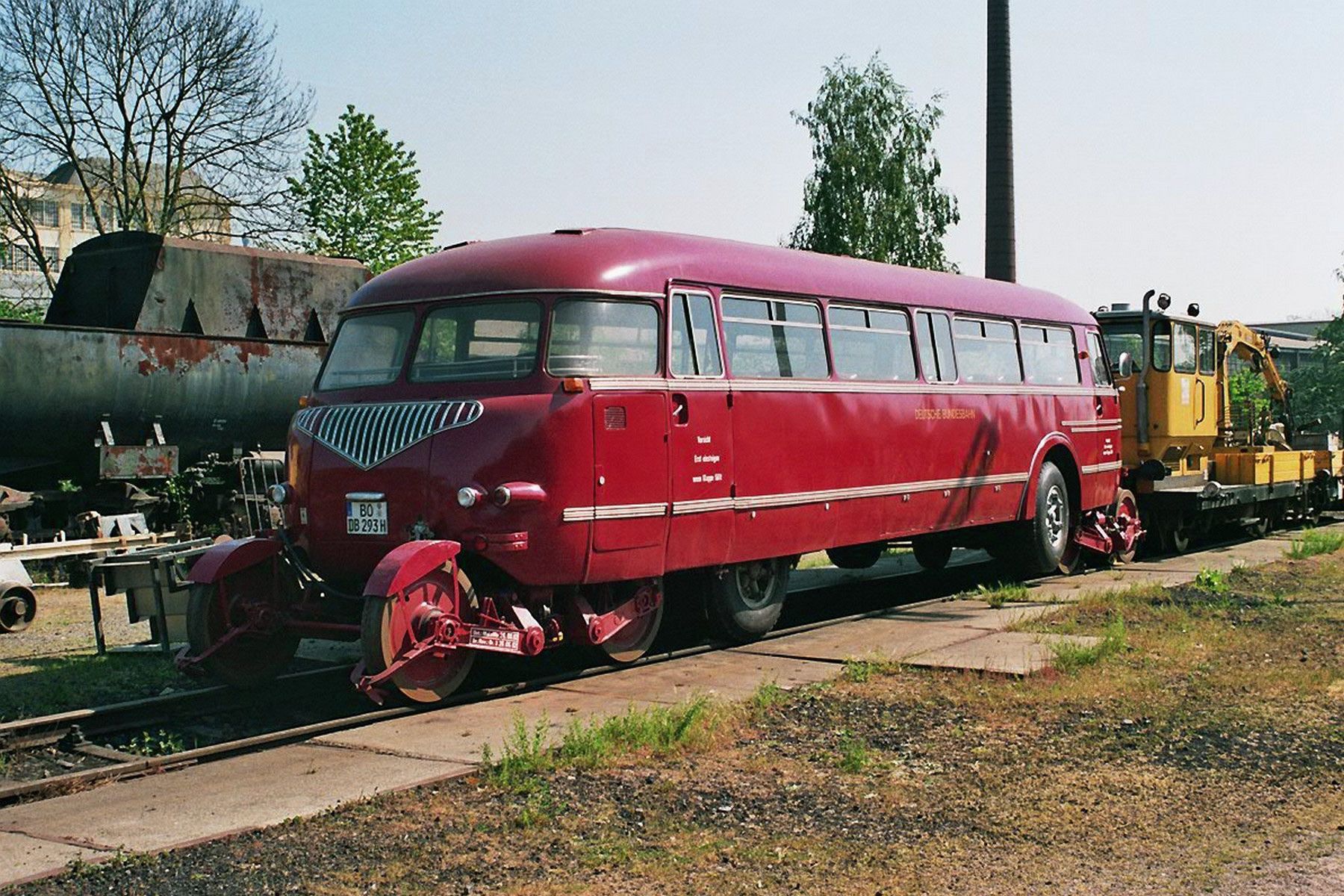
Rear view

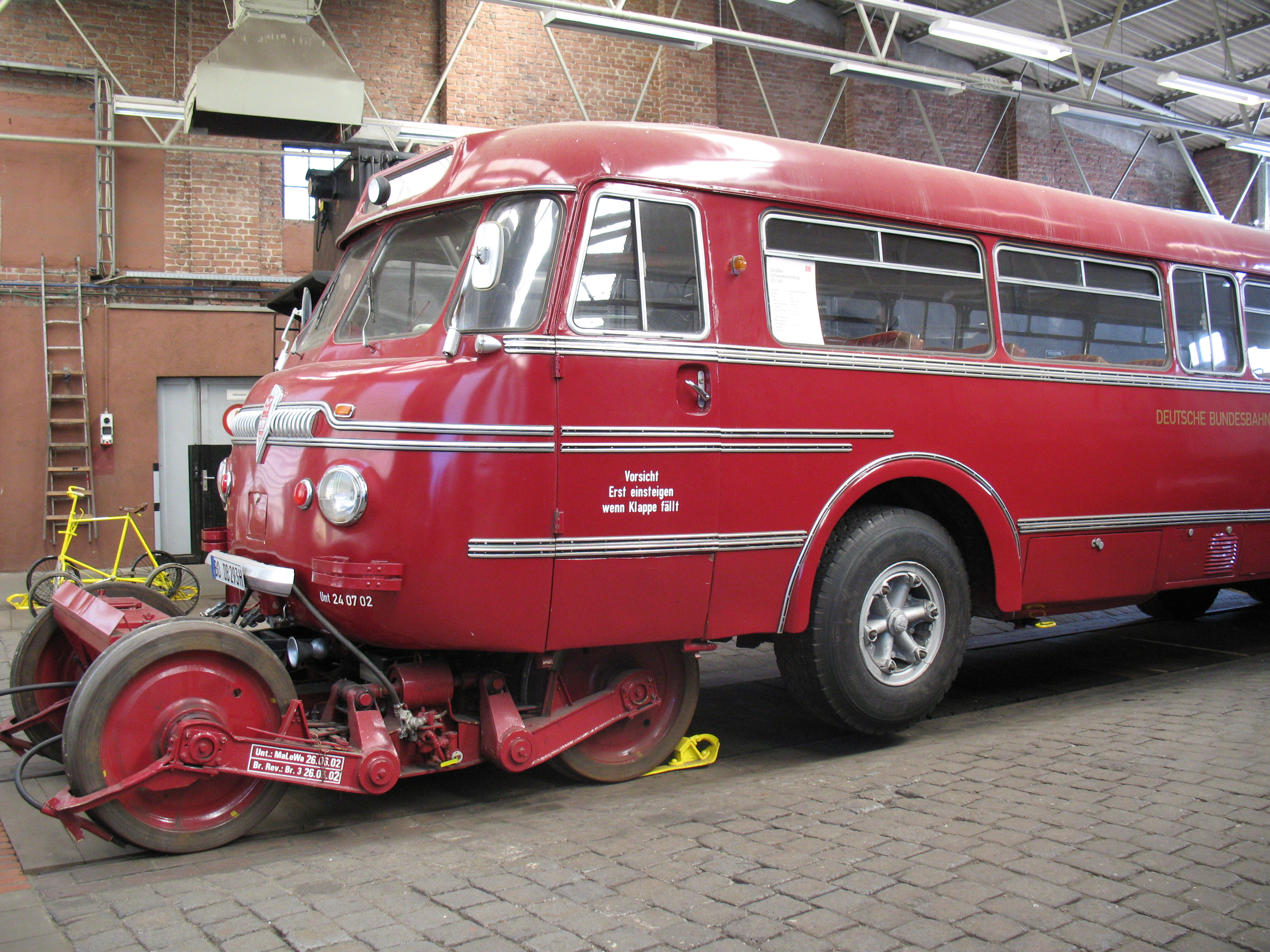
Showing details

In 1951, the Deutsche Bundesbahn ordered two prototypes from the Nordwestdeutscher Fahrzeugbau company in Wilhelmshaven. The track wagons were manufactured by Waggon und Maschinenbau GmbH Donauwörth. Prototypes were delivered and tested in 1952. Shortly afterwards, three series of vehicles followed; one was presented in March 1953 at the International Motor Show in Frankfurt am Main. In 1953, another fifty vehicles were ordered. In total, only fifteen wagons were used on the rails; the rest ran solely on roads.

== Use ==
=== Passau–Wegscheid ===
On the railway line Passau–Wegscheid, the railroad bus traversed steep sections. Because of winter snow, it did not run year-round.

==== Passau–Cham ====
The first three series vehicles were included at the beginning of the summer schedule as of 12 June 1953 on the route from Passau to Cham:

- Passau–Grafenau
- Grafenau–Bodenmais: 46 km (29 mi) of rail on the Grafenau–Zwiesel and Zwiesel–Bodenmais railway lines
- Bodenmais–Kötzting
- Kötzting–Cham: 17.8 km (11.1 mi) of rail on the Cham–Lam railway line

Of the 140.7 kilometres (87.4 miles) total distance, (Note: So: Amtliches Kursbuch der Deutschen Bundesbahn vom Sommer 1955; Bufe, S. 27, nennt 142,7 km.) 63.8 km (39.6 mi) was covered on rails. Ten minutes were allocated to moving from rail to road and vice versa. In addition, the direction of travel changed at Zwiesel station. The total travel time was five and a half hours. The connection was offered once a day. Since Cham lacked a storage facility, the connection was later extended by 19.2 km (11.9 mi) to Furth im Wald using the Schwandorf–Furth im Wald railway line, and a further change of direction in Cham was needed.

The connection in the Bavarian Forest existed until 1 June 1957. It was abandoned mainly because of traction problems encountered during winters. It was the only connection with the railroad bus that received its own timetable in the coursebook of the Deutsche Bundesbahn under number 426h, and was marked with a special signature on the attached map.

=== Augsburg–Füssen ===
From 1954 to 1958, the Augsburg–Füssen connection operated once a day. It ran from Augsburg to Füssen via Pforzen, the Allgäu Railway, the Biessenhofen–Füssen railway, the Marktoberdorf–Lechbruck, and Roßhaupten. In the coursebook, the railroad bus was led under number 406c. The journey took three hours and ten minutes.

=== Koblenz–Betzdorf ===
The Koblenz–Betzdorf link was established on the 1954–55 winter timetable. The route ran from Koblenz to Betzdorf via Dierdorf, the Engers-Au railway line to Au (Sieg), and farther on the Siegbahn. It was the most successful demonstration of this concept and therefore lasted the longest. The number of seats was often insufficient for the number of people who wanted to travel. A trip took two and a half hours. It was the only connection that offered two trips per day and direction. The last scheduled trip was on 27 May 1967.

=== Wutach Valley Railway ===
The Wutach Valley Railway was built for strategic military reasons. The middle section between Weizen and Blumberg covered a distance of 9.6 km (6.0 mi) directly, with a railway line of 24.7 km (15.3 mi) in length due to inclines. The response to its operation was negative, as ticket prices were based on route length, not on airline distance; traffic on the street was faster and cheaper. In the post-war period, when the route no longer held strategic military importance, rail traffic was discontinued in the middle section in 1955, but the sections in the north and south continued to be served by rail traffic. These transfers were spared for passengers, which is why the Deutsche Bundesbahn used the Schi-Stra-Bus on parallel federal road 314. However, the experience with the two-way vehicle was so bad that its use ended when the timetable changed in December 1955.

=== Further missions ===
There were other short operations, such as from Bernkastel to Remagen via the Black Forest Railway (Baden) to Immendingen, or from May 1953 to November 1955 that ran from Waldshut via the Hochrheinbahn.

== Remaining vehicle ==
An operational vehicle with two-track wagons is owned by the Bochum Railway Museum Foundation and displayed in its Railway Museum. However, the approval of the Federal Railway Authority limits its use today: tunnel passages and oncoming traffic on multi-track routes are not permitted. The interaction between road and rail is sometimes presented in larger venues.

== Other ==
When computer-readable vehicle numbers were introduced on 1 January 1968, the series number 790 was still assigned for the railroad bus, but all vehicles had already been retired by the cut-off date.

== Vehicles similar to the railroad bus ==
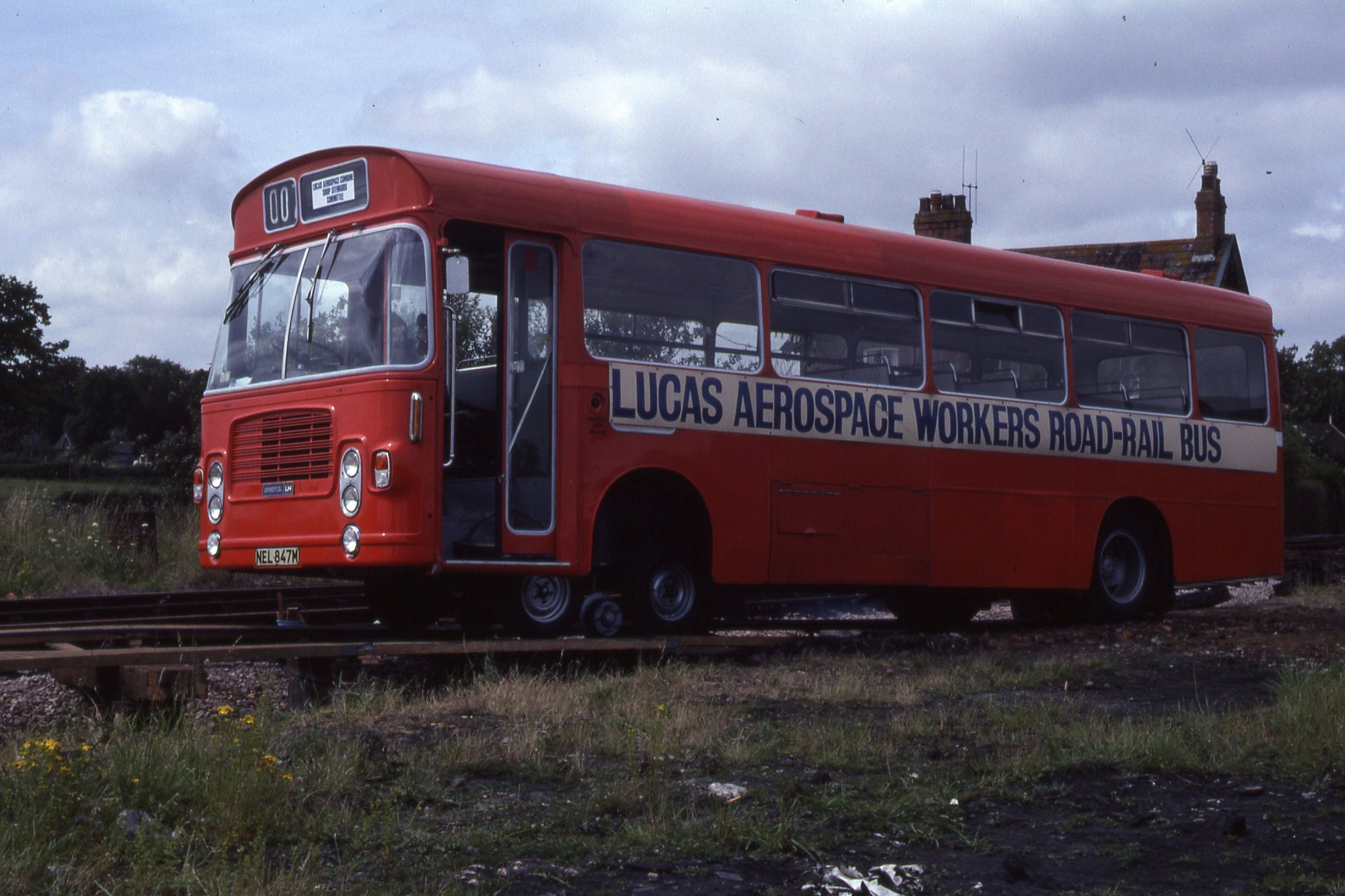
Lucas Aerospace Workers' Road-Rail Bus (1980) is a similar vehicle

=== France ===
In the early 1940s, the engineer Talon developed a system in which a normal street bus ran on rails and was able to pull a light Decauville railcar sidecar. The bus drove over a special ramp to two-track wagons, after which the front wheels no longer touched the rails, but the inside of the rear double wheels remained in contact with the track. At least one of these vehicles powered by wood gas was used in the summer of 1943 on the 54 km (34 mi) long railway line from Carcassonne to Quillan.

=== Japan ===
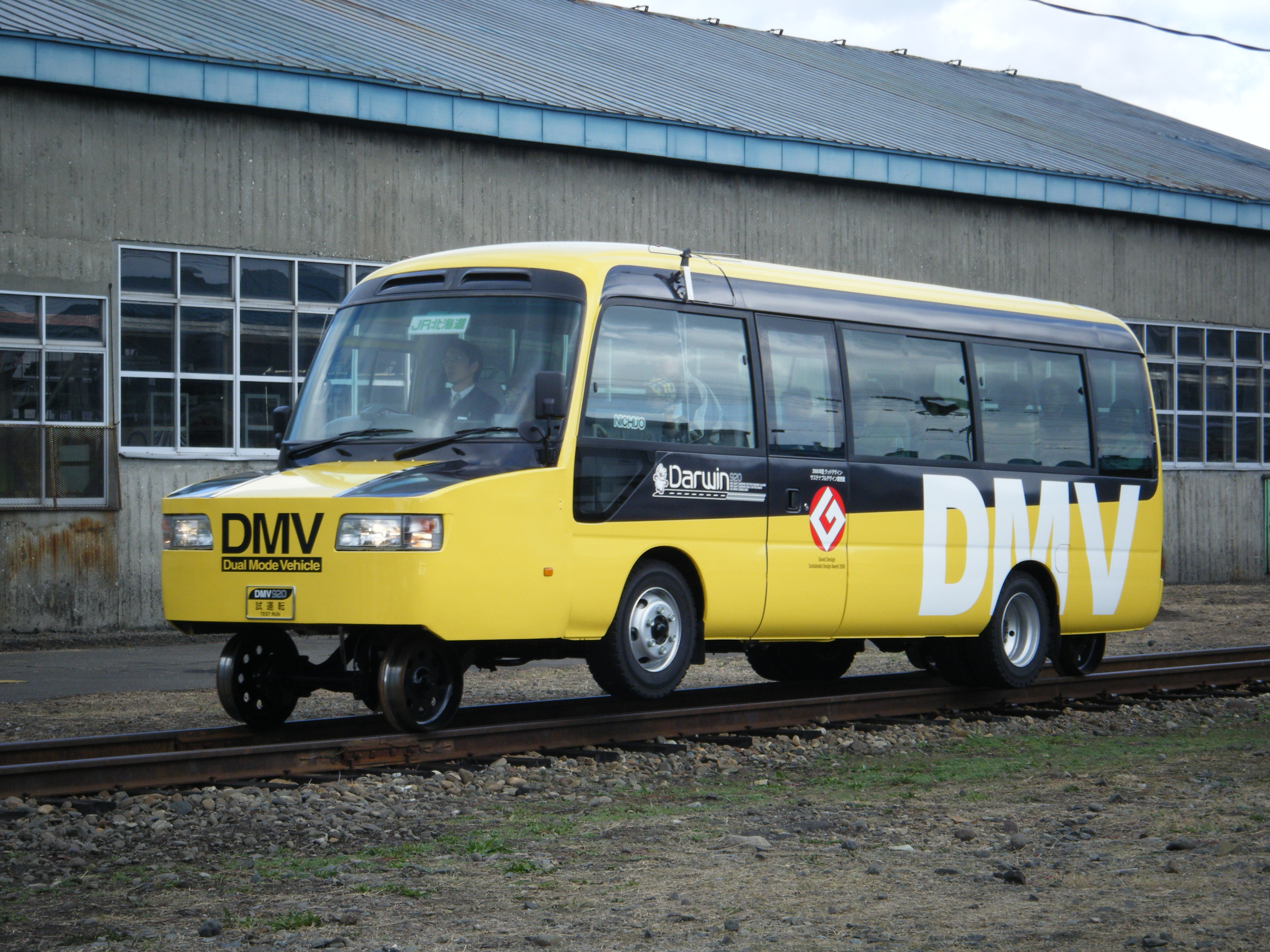
Japanese DMV

Railroad buses were also developed in Japan, by JR Hokkaido in 2002, under the name DMV (Dual Mode Vehicle). The DMV920 model no longer used external bogies, the two axles that are carried along are only lowered on the single rail.

==== Experimental phase on Hokkaido ====
A test vehicle (DMV901) began trials in January 2004 and DMV911/912 began in September 2005. Further testing began on 4 April 2007, on the Senmo Line between Mokoto and Hama-koshimizu. One leg is from Hama-koshimizu to Mokoto (about 11 km) as a rail trip and Mokoto to Hama-koshimizu as a passenger bus (about 25 km). DMV920 was completed in June 2008 with a capacity of 28 passengers.

==== Commercial operation on Shikoku ====
In 2016, the Asa Coast Railway decided to switch entirely to DMV vehicles, using JR Hokkaido's technology to modify vehicles in-house. The conversion was delayed due to the COVID-19 pandemic and further modifications required by the railway safety authority. Three DMVs began commercial operation on 25 December 2021.

=== United States ===
A similar system was experimented with in the United States in the second half of the 1960s. Two Red Arrow Lines diesel buses were converted so that they could also run on rails. It did not perform well in the U.S., and it was not introduced to the public.

== See also ==
- Dual-mode vehicle
- LMS Karrier Ro-Railer
- Road–rail vehicle
- Roadrailer
- Wheelset

== Notes ==
1. Sun: Bufe, p. 27. Since the vehicles were only delivered in 1952, it probably has to read "1952".
2. Sun: Official coursebook of the Deutsche Bundesbahn from summer 1955; Bufe, p. 27, mentions 142.7 km.
