= Fig mosaic virus =

- Symptoms of fig mosaic on fig leaves

Virus classification
- (unranked): Virus
- Realm: Riboviria
- Kingdom: Orthornavirae
- Phylum: Negarnaviricota
- Class: Bunyaviricetes
- Order: Elliovirales
- Family: Fimoviridae
- Genus: Emaravirus
- Species: Emaravirus fici

Synonyms
- Fig mosaic emaravirus

Species of virus

Fig mosaic virus (FMV) is a segmented, negative sense, single-stranded RNA virus that is determined to be the causal agent of fig mosaic disease (FMD) in fig plants, Ficus carica. It is a member of the genus Emaravirus and is transmitted mainly by the eriophyid mite Aceria ficus. FMV can cause a range of symptoms varying in severity, including leaf chlorosis, deformity, and mosaic or discoloration patterns, as well as premature fruit drop.

== History ==
Fig mosaic disease (FMD) was first described and suspected to be of viral origin in 1933 by Ira J. Condit and W.T.Horne. It was determined to be caused by a virus in 2009 by Jeewan Jyot Walia, Nida M. Salem, and Bryce W. Falk. The disease and associated virus have since been observed in Greece, Italy, Spain, Turkey, Syria, Tunisia, Algeria, Jordan, New Zealand, China, Great Britain, Puerto Rico, Australia, and the United States.

== Classification ==
FMV has been placed in the genus Emaravirus, which contains other single-stranded, negative-sense, segmented RNA plant viruses. Emaraviruses all contain four to six genome segments. They are also common in their mode of transmission, which is via various species of eriophyid mites by unknown mechanism as well as mechanical modes of transmission. Besides FMV, the genus Emaravirus includes European mountain ash ringspot-associated virus (EMARaV), Rose rosette virus (RRV), Raspberry leaf blotch virus (RLBV), and other species.

== Genome Structure ==
The FMV genome consists of segmented (multipartite) negative-sense, single-stranded RNA. The genome has long been thought to have four segments, but recent findings have supported the existence of six RNA genome segments. Each segment has one open reading frame (ORF). The first segment, FMV vcRNA 1 (7093 nt), is common to all viruses of genus Emaravirus and codes for the virus's 264 kDa RNA-dependent RNA polymerase (RdRp), which has endonuclease activity near the N-terminus. The second segment, vcRNA2, (2252 nt) encodes a 73 kDa putative glycoprotein. FMV vcRNA3 (1490 nt) encodes a 35 kDa nucleocapsid (N) protein. FMV vcRNA4 (1472 nt) encodes a 40.5 kDa protein with function still unknown. The two most recently discovered segments, RNA5 and RNA6, unlike the other four segments, are not highly conserved within the genus. Perhaps this is because they are truncated or defective, but the functions of the proteins they encode is still undetermined.

== Movement between and into cells (FMV-p4) ==
Like all plant viruses, FMV encodes a movement protein (MP) to enable it to move between cells, usually by increasing the size exclusion limits (SEL) of plasmodesmata to allow viral passage. FMV's MP is most likely p4, an inference that is supported by its localization in the plasma membrane but has not been definitively shown yet.

== Genome replication via cap snatching ==
FMV vcRNA 1 codes for RNA dependent RNA polymerase protein (RdRp), which has endonuclease function at its N terminus and is packaged in the virion. Once the virion has entered a cell, RdRp binds to host mRNA and uses endonuclease activity to cleave the 5’ methylated cap for use as a primer for mRNA synthesis and as a way to hijack host translational machinery

== DMBs and LFPs ==
Infection with FMV results in distinct double-membrane bodies or particles, called DMBs or DMPs, 90–200 nm in diameter in the cytosol of infected parenchyma cells. These double membrane-bound bodies are surrounded by a fibril matrix and found only in leaves showing mosaic symptoms at a macro level, never in the uninfected tissue used as a control. Some cultivars have also shown long, flexuous, rod-shaped, virus-like particles (LFPs) in tissues showing signs of necrosis. These are also not seen in uninfected control tissues. Neither type has a determined function.

== Symptoms ==
FMV results in a variety of symptoms, some of which could have strong agricultural detriment, such as decreased fruit yield. Symptoms include appearance of a leaf mosaic pattern, defoliation, decreased fruit yield, vein banding, ringspots, distortion and chlorosis of leaves, and yellow spotting on fruits.

== Unknowns and future research ==
There are still many aspects of this virus’ molecular structure and function that are unknown. The protein encoded by the fourth segment on the viral genome, RNA4, still has an unknown function. Additionally, the exact molecular mechanisms of FMV's replication, and emaravirus replication in general, are still not confirmed. Current research is also working on learning more about the nature of DMBs/DMPs, as they are difficult to isolate from infected plants.
