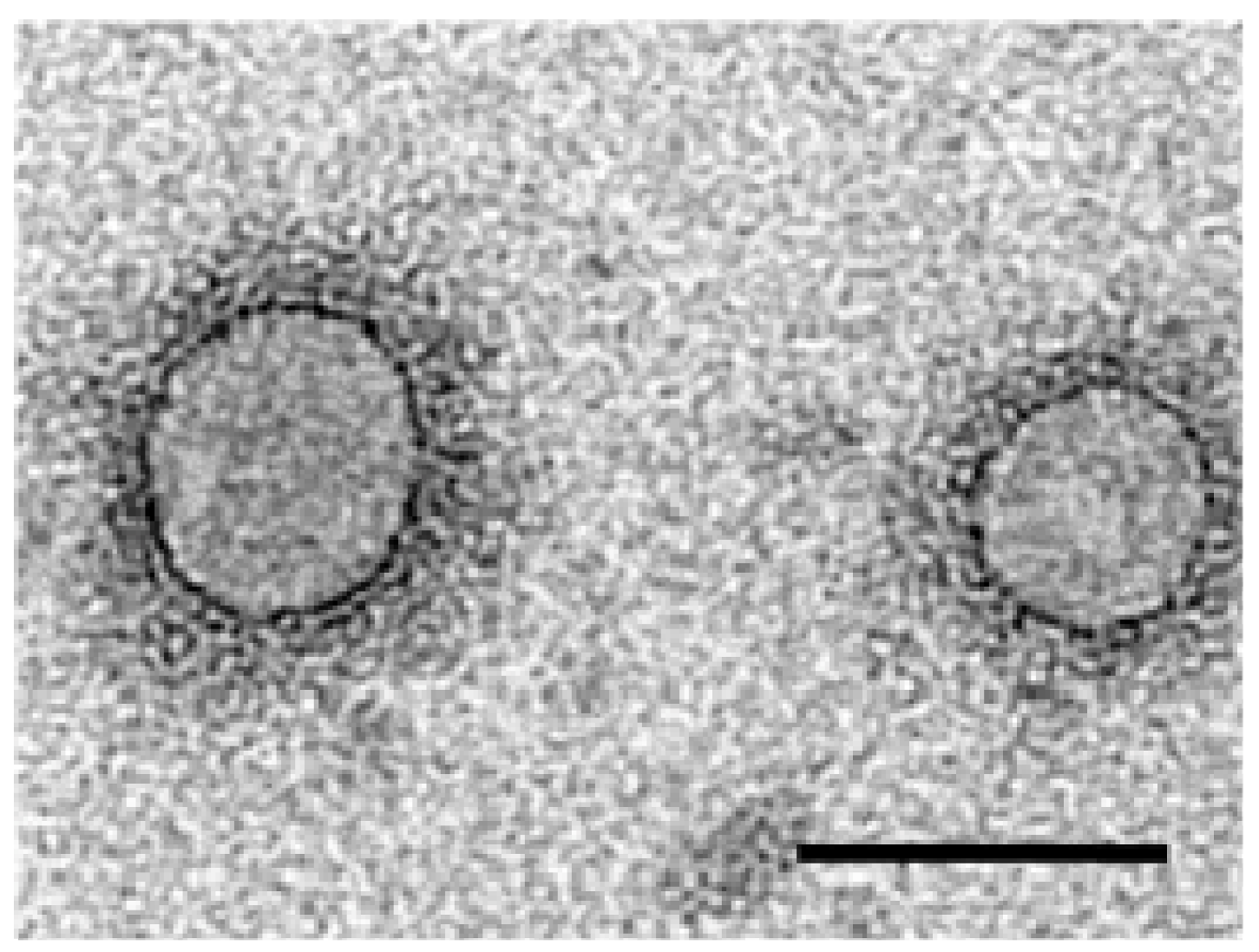

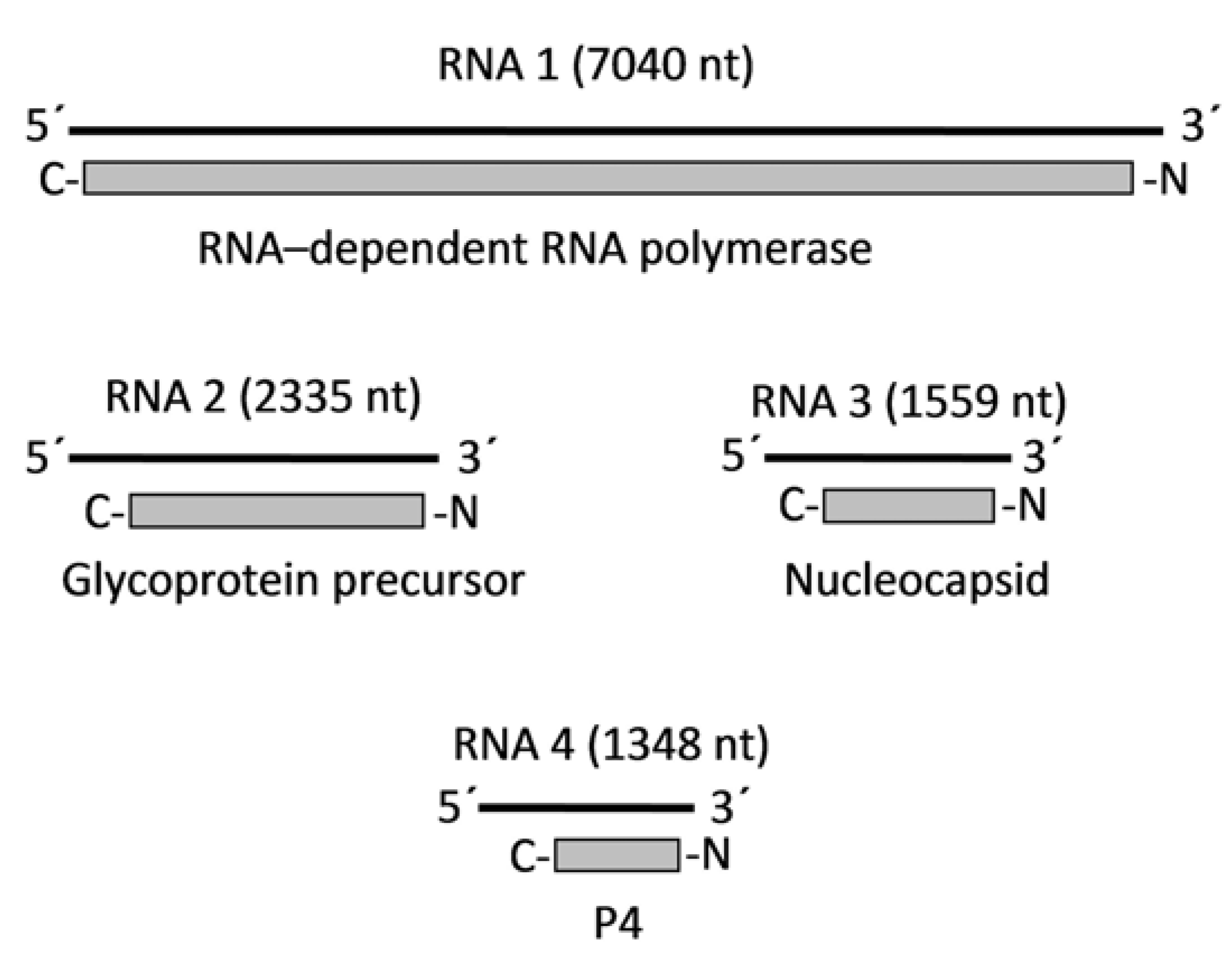
- Electron micrograph of European mountain ash ringspot-associated virus and genome (bar = 100 nm)

Virus classification
- (unranked): Virus
- Realm: Riboviria
- Kingdom: Orthornavirae
- Phylum: Negarnaviricota
- Class: Bunyaviricetes
- Order: Elliovirales
- Family: Fimoviridae
- Genus: Emaravirus

Species
- See text

= Emaravirus =

Genus of viruses

Emaravirus is a genus of negative-strand RNA viruses which infect plants. The plant virus group is the sole genus in the family Fimoviridae.

== Structure ==
Virions of this genus are between 80 and 100 nm and consists of an enveloped ribonucleocapsid that exhibits helical symmetry.

== Genome ==
The genomes are segmented, consisting of four strands of negative-sense single-stranded RNA.

== Taxonomy ==
The genus contains the following species, listed by scientific name and followed by the exemplar virus of the species:

- Emaravirus aceris, Maple mottle-associated virus
- Emaravirus actinidiae, Actinidia chlorotic ringspot-associated virus
- Emaravirus ailanthi, Ailanthus crinkle leaf-associated virus
- Emaravirus artemisiae, Artemisia fimovirus 1
- Emaravirus cajani, Pigeonpea sterility mosaic virus 1
- Emaravirus camelliae, Camellia japonica-associated virus 1
- Emaravirus cercidis, Redbud yellow ringspot-associated virus
- Emaravirus chrysanthemi, Chrysanthemum mosaic-associated virus
- Emaravirus clematis, Clematis yellow mottle-associated virus
- Emaravirus cordylinae, Ti ringspot-associated virus
- Emaravirus corynocarpi, Karaka Okahu purepure emaravirus
- Emaravirus fici, Fig mosaic virus
- Emaravirus fraxini, Ash shoestring-associated virus
- Emaravirus idaeobati, Raspberry leaf blotch virus
- Emaravirus illicii, Japanese star anise ringspot-associated virus
- Emaravirus kiwii, Actinidia virus 2
- Emaravirus kudzu, Pueraria lobata-associated emaravirus
- Emaravirus parkinsoniae, Palo verde broom virus
- Emaravirus perillae, Perilla mosaic virus
- Emaravirus pistaciae, Pistacia virus B
- Emaravirus populi, Aspen mosaic-associated virus
- Emaravirus pyri, Pear chlorotic leaf spot-associated virus
- Emaravirus quercus, Common oak ringspot-associated virus
- Emaravirus rosae, Rose rosette virus
- Emaravirus rubi, Blackberry leaf mottle-associated virus
- Emaravirus sorbi, European mountain ash ringspot-associated virus
- Emaravirus syringae, Lilac chlorotic ringspot-associated virus
- Emaravirus toordali, Pigeonpea sterility mosaic virus 2
- Emaravirus tritici, High Plains wheat mosaic virus
- Emaravirus verbanni, Camellia japonica-associated virus 2
- Emaravirus visci, Arceuthobium sichuanense-associated virus 1
- Emaravirus vitis, Vitis emaravirus
- Emaravirus ziziphi, Jujube yellow mottle-associated virus
