= Road–rail vehicle =

Vehicle capable of travelling on roads and railway tracks

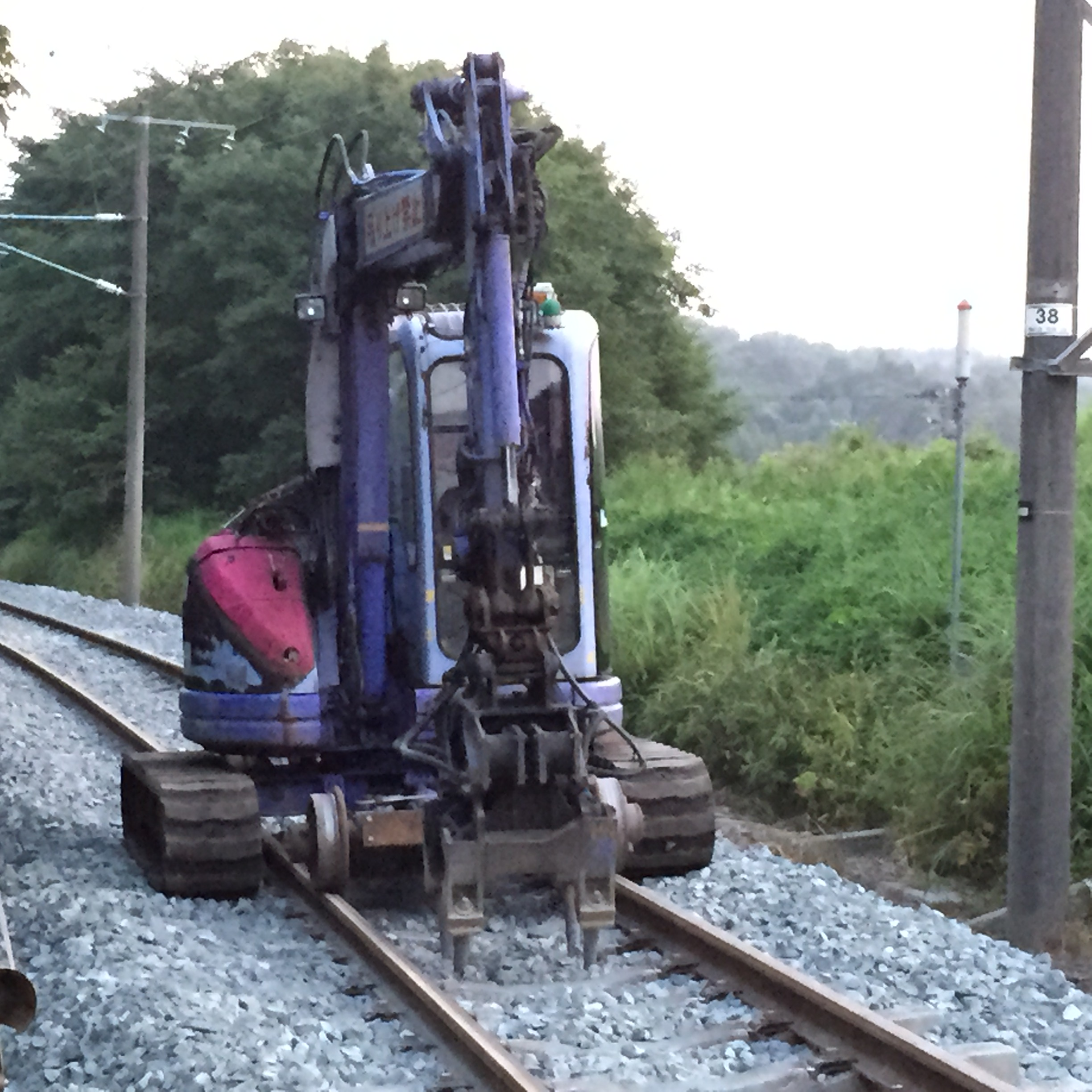
Road–rail excavator

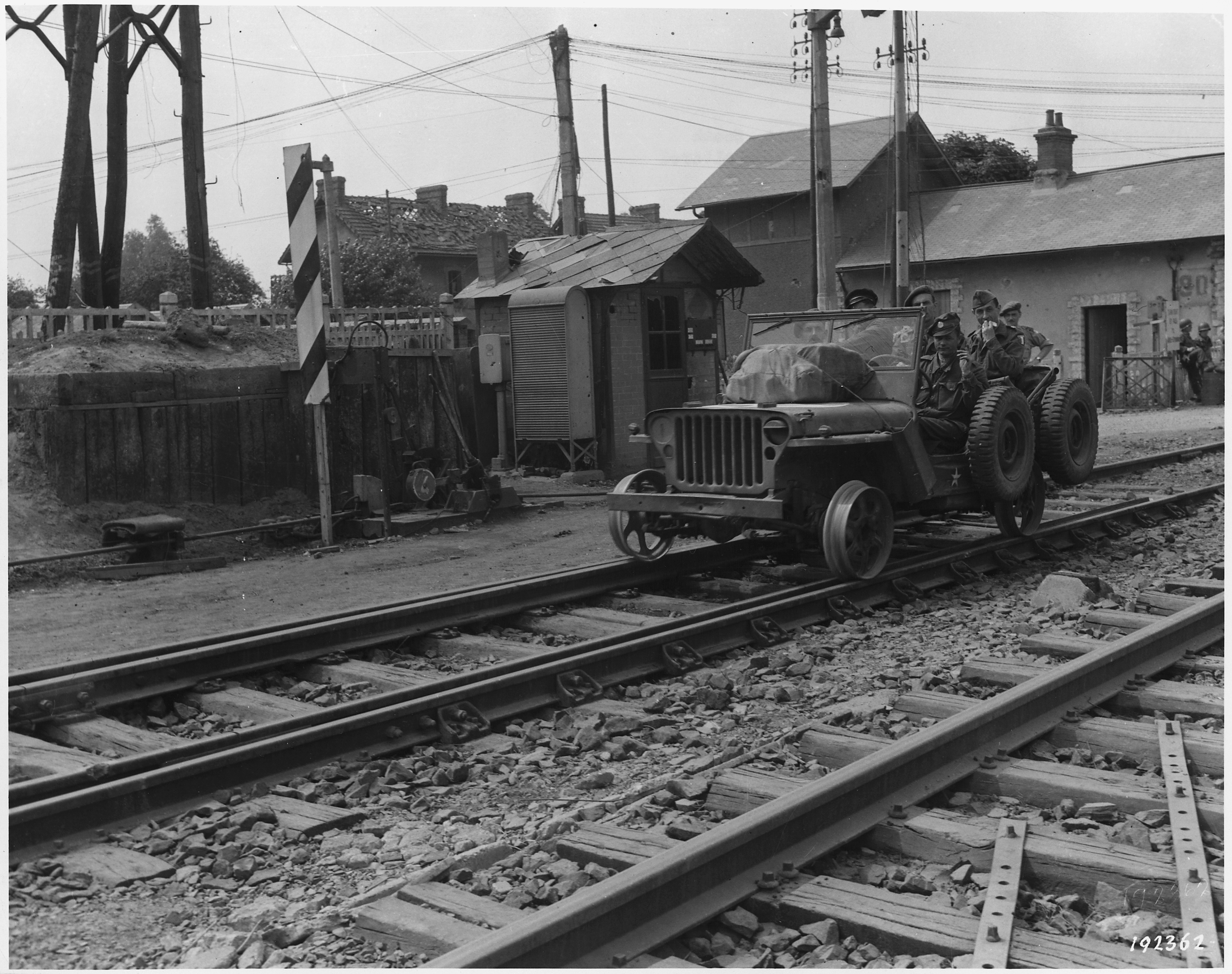
British jeep in France, 1945

A road–rail vehicle or a rail–road vehicle is a dual-mode vehicle that can operate on both rail tracks and roads. They are also known as two-way vehicles (German: Zweiwegefahrzeug), hi–rail (from highway and railway, or variations such as high–rail, HiRail, Hy–rail), and rail and road vehicles.

They are often converted road vehicles that keep their normal wheels with rubber tires but are fitted with additional flanged steel wheels for running on rails. Propulsion is typically through the conventional tires, the flanged wheels being free-rolling, used to keep the vehicle on the rails; the rail wheels are raised and lowered as needed. There are also purpose-built road–rail vehicles. In case of jeep trains, road wheels are directly replaced with railway wheels. Vehicles with tires need special areas like level crossings to change modes. A vehicle on caterpillar tracks, rather than road wheels, which allows mode change anywhere without the need to use a level crossing, has been proposed and modelled by Chinese engineers.

== Overview ==
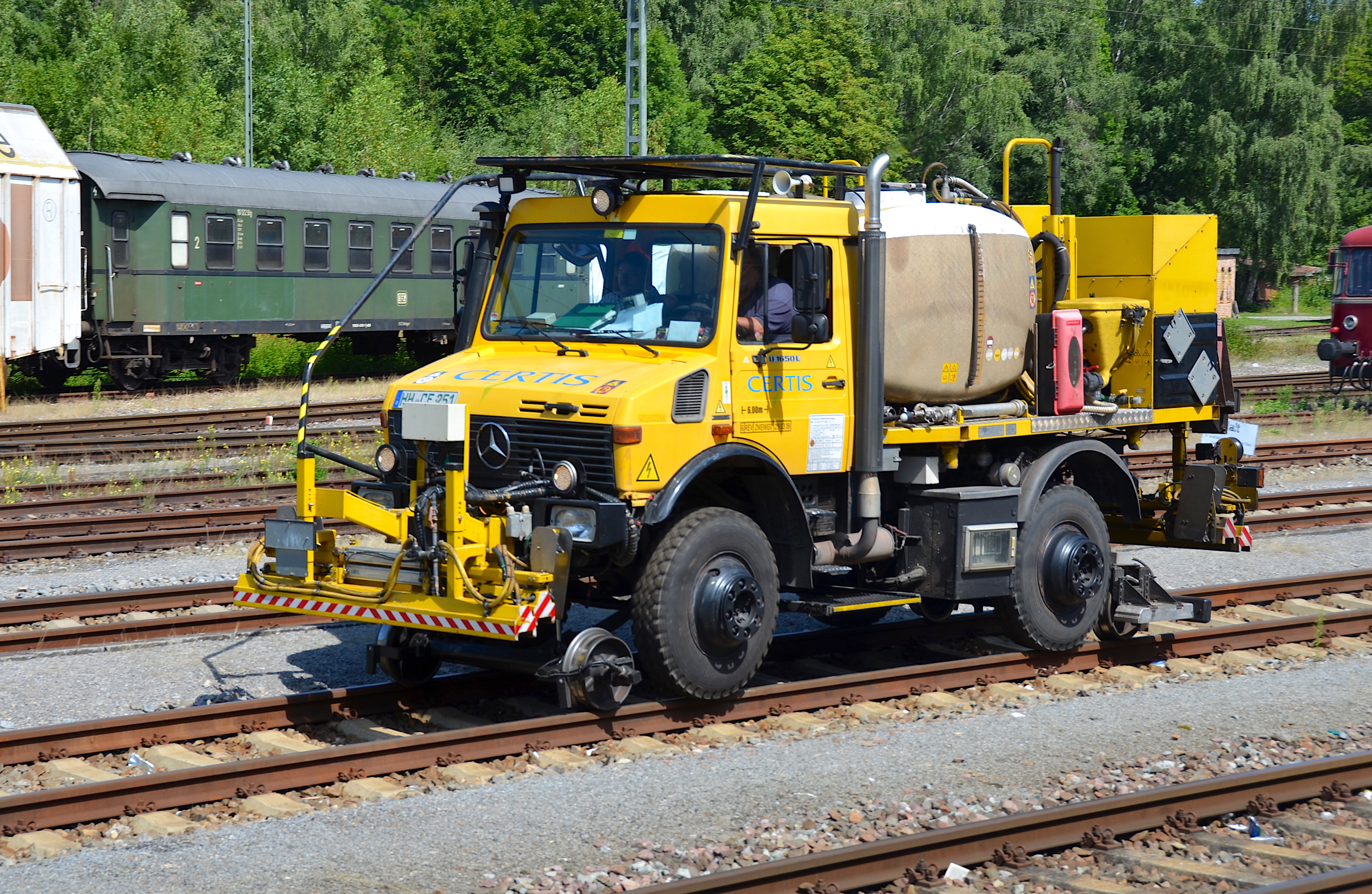
Certis Unimog, road–rail vehicle used for vegetation control

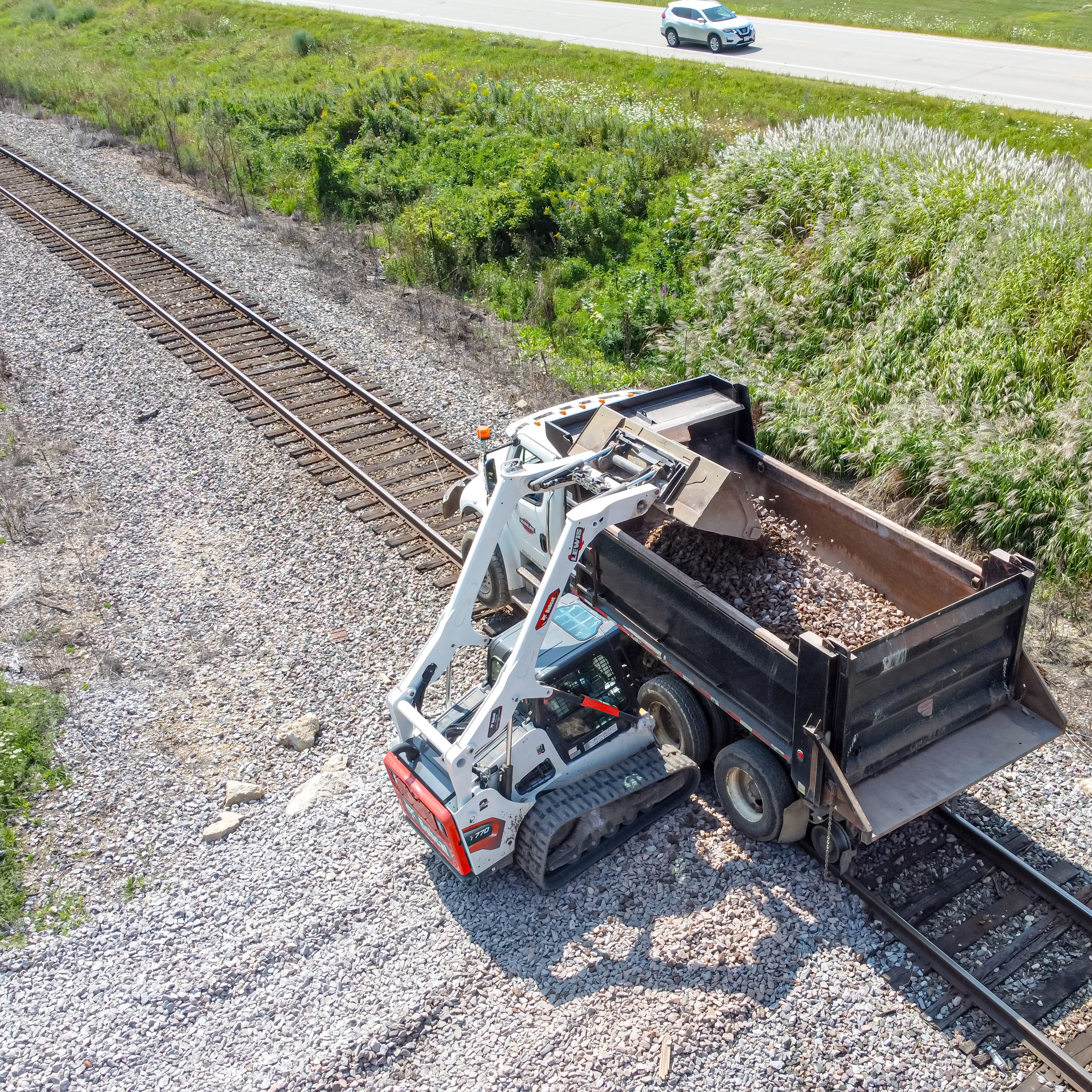
Road–rail dump truck

Most road–rail such vehicles are used for railroad right-of-way maintenance during engineering possessions of the line, when a section of the line is handed over for maintenance and operational trains are blocked from entering the section. Military-used railroad vehicles take advantage of intact railways for locomotion or are used as emergency locomotives. Their usage as passenger buses is rare and mostly experimental. Maintenance railroad vehicles can be driven on roads to near the site and then converted to a rail vehicle for the final journey to the worksite. That avoids the complex maneuvers that would be associated with a road vehicle accessing a worksite that is not near a road.

Since they are normally converted road vehicles, they would not fare well in a collision with heavy rolling stock and therefore can normally drive only on rail tracks under an engineering possession, when the line is closed to normal traffic. They are generally designed to be insulated and so do not activate railway signalling circuits. Nevertheless, some rail operators prefer them to be non-insulated so that they are detectable by train safety systems. The latter operators normally deploy them on remote lines without boom gates, etc.

== History ==
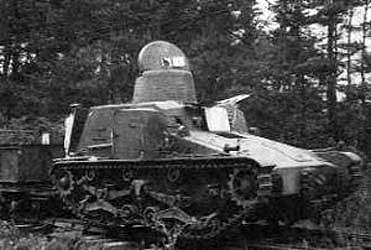
Type 95 armoured railroad car So-Ki (九五式装甲軌道車) on tracks, pulling some cars

An early promoter of the road–rail system was Brigadier General Robert Stronach, who part of a company called Roadrails Ltd, which was formed around 1920. Roadrails Ltd held a number of patents regarding vehicles that could run on roads or rails. The idea was that rails offered less rolling resistance, and roads offered greater tractive effort, and the combination would allow either greater loads to be hauled and loads to be hauled on steeper gradients, which would reduce a major cost of building a railway. In 1922, Stronach patented a road–rail tractor, which could be driven on the road or have a front set of rail wheels jacked down to allow it to haul a load on rails by being guided by the rails but driven by the rear road wheels. Such a road–rail tractor, resembling a normal road truck, was part of the 1924 British Empire Exhibition at Wembley, where it hauled coaches around the exhibition area.

One problem with the road–rail tractor was reversing while on the rails, but the ability to raise the bogie and swap to road mode allowed it to run round the train. The 1923 annual general meeting, the new method for converting from road to rail was stated to now take only 2 minutes. The company was "completing designs for a caterpillar type" and of another type for tram service.

Unfortunately, Roadrails Ltd later focussed on locomotives that were rail-only but used road wheel for traction either side of the track, and moved away from the style of vehicle shown at the Exhibition with its usefulness in factory yards, dockyards, etc where it could function on road or rail. A 'Road–rail' branch was built in South Africa, and this used two road–rail locomotives, both converted from steam traction engines. One could be used on road or rail, but the other used a Dutton patent (see South African Dutton road–rail tractors) whereby a rail vehicle used road wheel traction, which thus required both road and rail to function. In the end, the experiment was unsuccessful, the branch had reverted to normal steam engines by about 1927, and Roadrails Ltd was closed down around the same time.

== Military usage ==
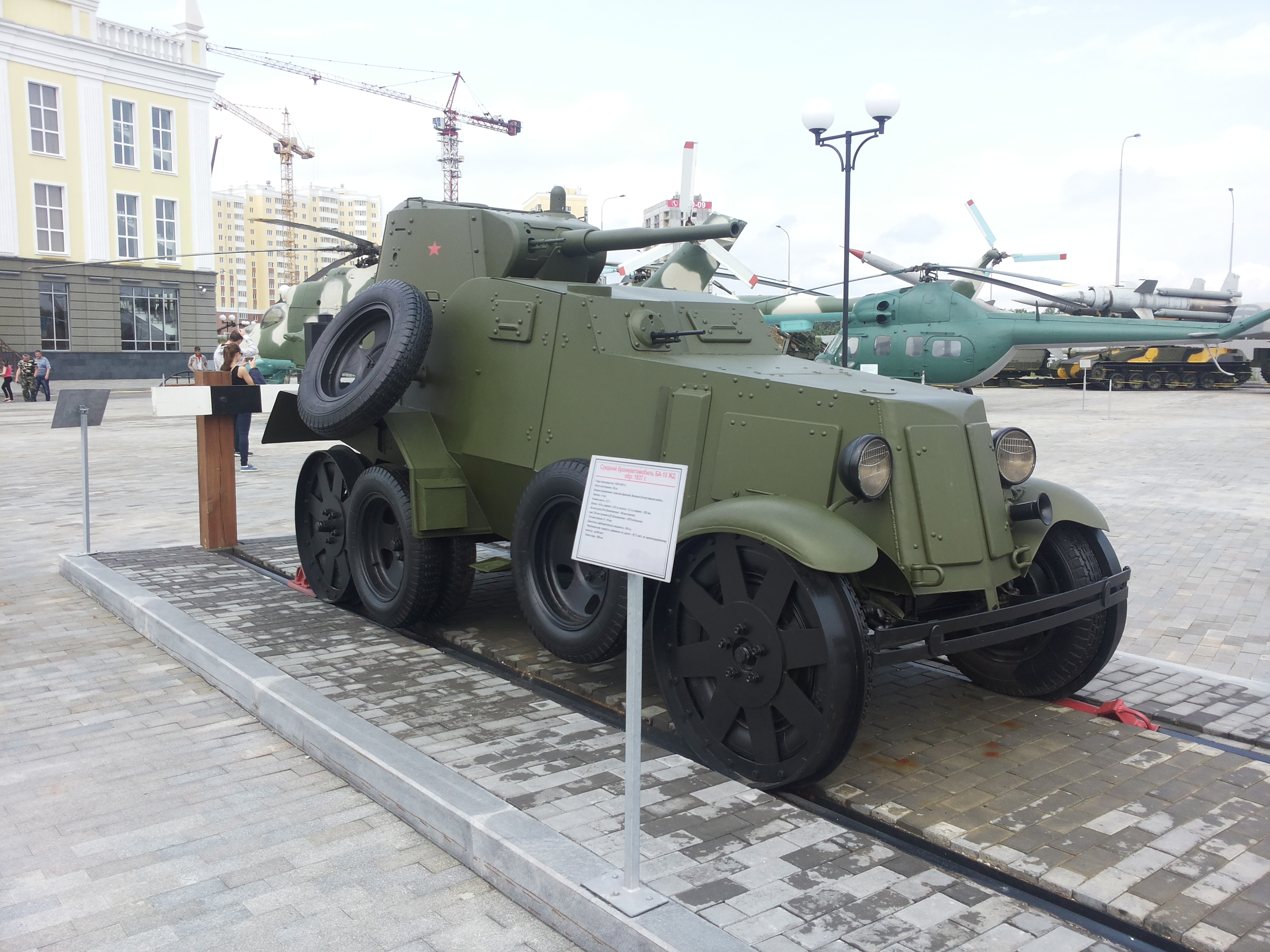
Road–rail version of BA-10 armoured car

BAD-2 was a Soviet experimental amphibious armoured car first produced in 1932, which could also go on rail tracks. The changing for rail mode took 30 minutes.

From 1933, small numbers of FAI-ZhD were produced. FAI-ZhD was a modification of FAI for additional railway usage. The speed on rails was 85 km/h forward and 24 km/h reverse. The road speed was 40 km/h. The changing of modes took the crew 30 minutes.

From 1933, the Empire of Japan started to produce the Sumida M.2593. It was a 7.7 ton 10 mm armoured vehicle with 6 wheels. The road wheels could be replaced by flanged wheels for railways. Its speed was 40 km/h on road and 60 km/h on rail.

The Type 95 So-Ki was a tankette produced in the Empire of Japan between 1935 and 1943. It had tank tracks for ground travel and retractable flanged wheels for railways. Changing from railway to ground mode took one minute, and changing from ground to railways took three minutes. In addition, the flanged wheels could be adjusted for narrow, standard and broad gauge railway tracks.

The BTR-40 ZhD was the armored personnel carrier BTR-40 equipped with additional rail wheels. It was further developed to the railway version of BTR-40A in 1969. Rerailment took 3–5 minutes. Its road speed was 78 km/h and its rail speed was 65 km/h.

== Road–rail buses ==
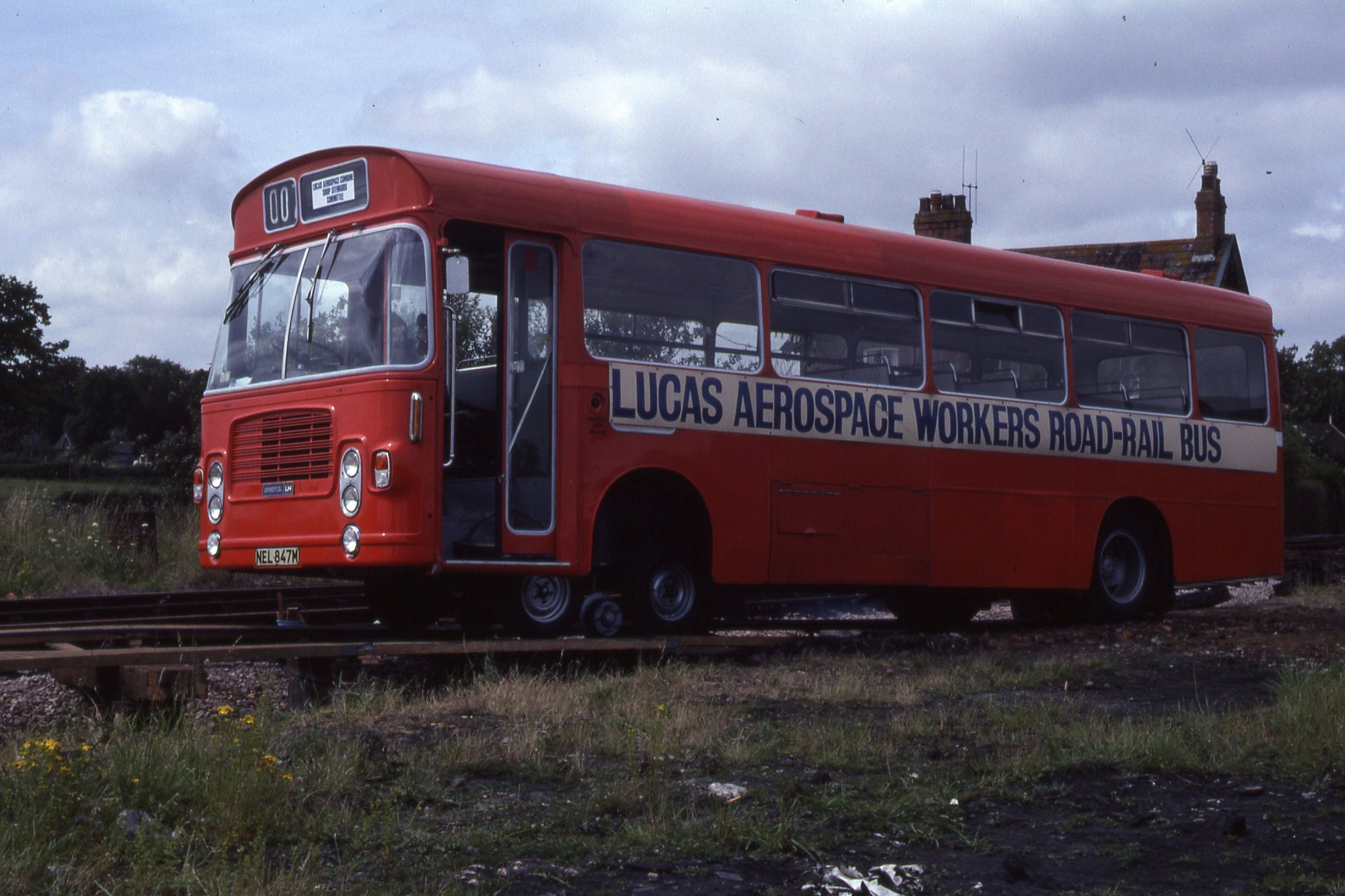
Lucas Aerospace Workers' Road–Rail Bus, 1980

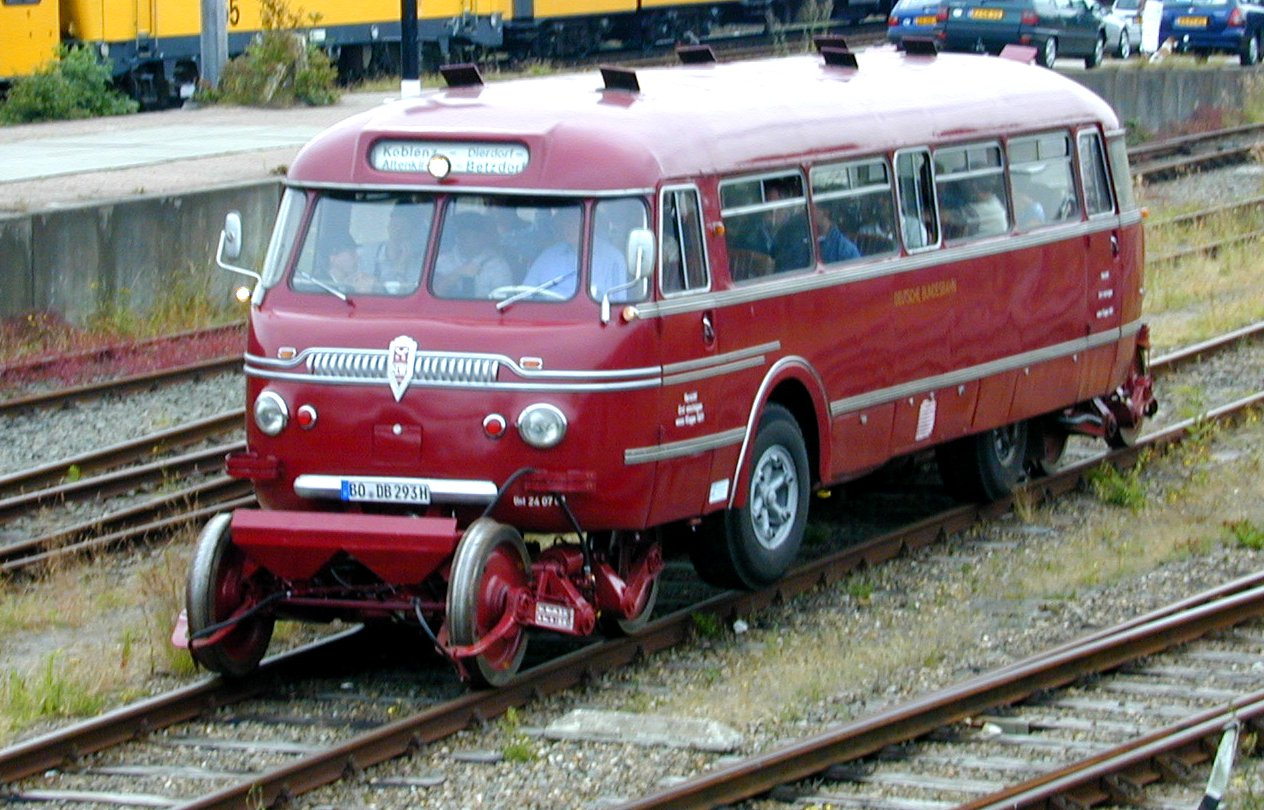
Schienen-Straßen-Omnibus

Attempts have been made over the years to design buses and coaches that could operate on both roads and railway tracks. Siemens & Halske presented an electric street car bus (German: Straßenbahn-Omnibus) in 1898 in Berlin. This vehicle ran on batteries and had a range of 6 km (3.7 mi).

Some attempts were carried out in Britain during the 1930s on the Nickey Line by LMS, using a Ro-Railer.

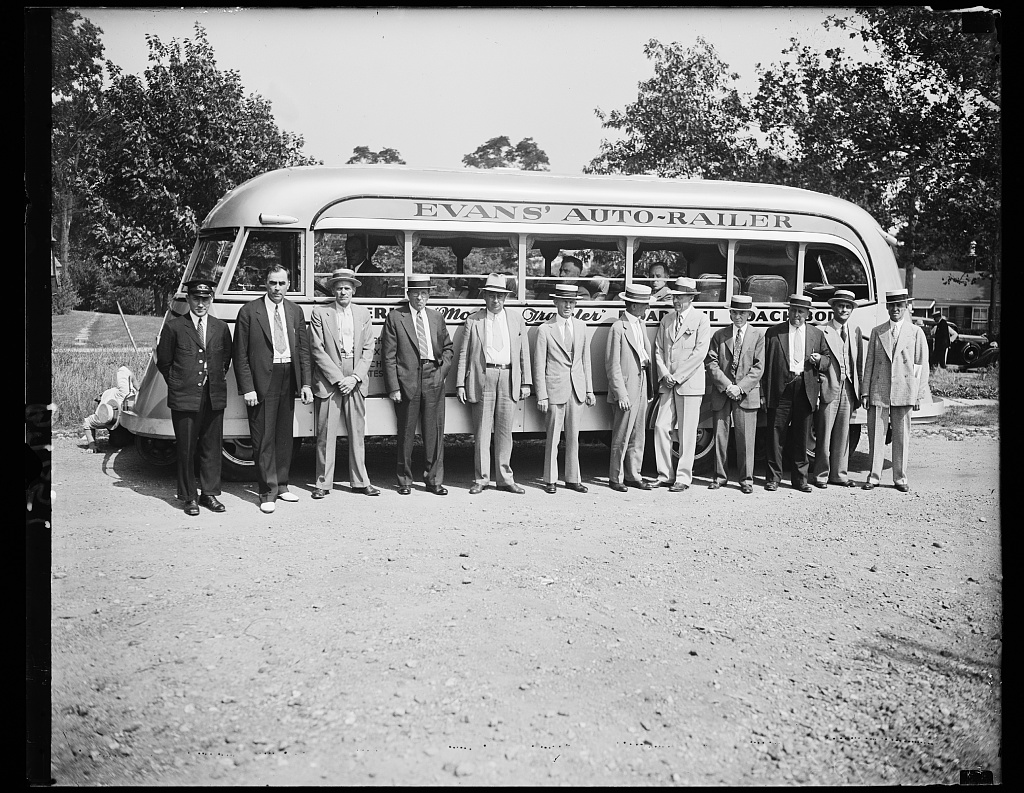
Evans Auto-Railer; Harris & Ewing; 1930

In the 1930s, the Evans Products Company in the USA marketed the Evans Auto-Railer, a bus designed to also travel on railway tracks. The Evans Auto-Railer could also transport freight of 2.5–3 t and go on wet, icy and snow-covered railtracks. In the winter of 1934/35, an experimental unit travelled 2,500 miles (4,023 km).

In the early 1940s, the engineer Talon developed a system in which a normal street bus ran on rails and was able to pull a light Decauville railcar sidecar. The bus drove over a special ramp to two-track wagons after which the front wheels no longer touched the rails, but the inside of the rear double wheels remained in contact with the track. At least one of the vehicles powered by wood gas was used in the summer of 1943 on the 54 km (34 mi) long railway line from Carcassonne to Quillan.

The German Deutsche Bundesbahn operated buses, called the Schi-Stra-Bus, which could be fitted with separate bogies in different areas from the 1950s to the 1970s.

In 1967/68, two Red Arrow Line diesel buses were converted so that they could also run on rails. This experiment did not succeed because the requirements for railcars and road vehicles were too different.

In 1983, the Greater London Council considered investing £230,000 into the Lucas rail-bus, which could run on roads and rail tracks. The original concept was developed by Lucas Aerospace workers in the 1970s. In 1980/1981, the workers' combine built a prototype out of a second-hand Bristol bus. The enthusiasm arose from the opportunity to cut costs on rail vehicle production by partially integrating bus parts. Two challenges had to be solved: the consequences of collisions with much heavier rail vehicles and the supervision of the transition from road to rail.

A Japanese vehicle changing from bus mode into railcar mode

Railroad buses were also developed in Japan, by JR Hokkaido in 2002, under the name DMV (Dual Mode Vehicle). The DMV920 model no longer used external bogies; the two axles that are carried along are only lowered on the single rail. A test vehicle (DMV901) began trials in January 2004 and DMV911/912 began in September 2005. Further testing began on 4 April 2007, on the Senmo Line between Mokoto and Hama-koshimizu. One leg is from Hama-koshimizu to Mokoto (about 11 km) as a rail trip and Mokoto to Hama-koshimizu as a passenger bus (about 25 km). DMV920 was completed in June 2008 with a capacity of 28 passengers. Asa Kaigan Railway started dual mode buses on 25 December 2021.

On the Abilene and Smoky Valley Railroad, the hyrail bus Silver Flyer Rail Bus is used for excursion, which can travel on both road and rail.

In 2022, SNCF has presented the concept of FLEXY, a road-rail fully+electric autonomous shuttle for areas of low population density. The first experiments are planned for 2024.

In 2026, the French engineering company SICEF is testing light electric vehicles to reuse approximately 5,700 km of abandoned secondary railway lines. They are capable of running both on railways and on roads. The project is named as "Uber on rails". The vehicles run automatically on rails.

== Manufacturers ==
Evans Auto-Railer was a pioneer in the US in the 1930s and 1940s. Evans seems to have produced all road–rail vehicle adaptations for the US military during WWII, but was rapidly overtaken by Fairmont immediately post-war.

Aries Hyrail branded vehicles have been manufactured in Australia for several decades. Aries Hyrail vehicles continue to be manufactured by Aries Rail.

UK-based Permaquip manufactures highway-based road rail vehicles, trailers, and attachments.

Continental Railworks is a road–rail conversion unit manufacturer based in Montreal, Canada, producing hi–rail units since 1997. Their products are known for the automatic locking / unlocking feature and for the rubber spring induced downforce applied to the rails.

A vehicle on caterpillar tracks, rather than road wheels, which allows mode change anywhere without the need to use a level crossing, has been proposed and modelled by Chinese engineers.

Vollert Anlagenbau GmbH has developed a unmanned road–rail remote controlled vehicle VLEX for shunting up to 800 t.

Sweden-based Goldschmidt Sweden is one of the leading manufacturers of road–rail vehicles. Their range encompasses catenary maintenance vehicles, tunnel and bridge inspection vehicles, measurement vehicles, grinding and welding vehicles, and other customized road–rail solutions.

== Road-transferable locomotive ==
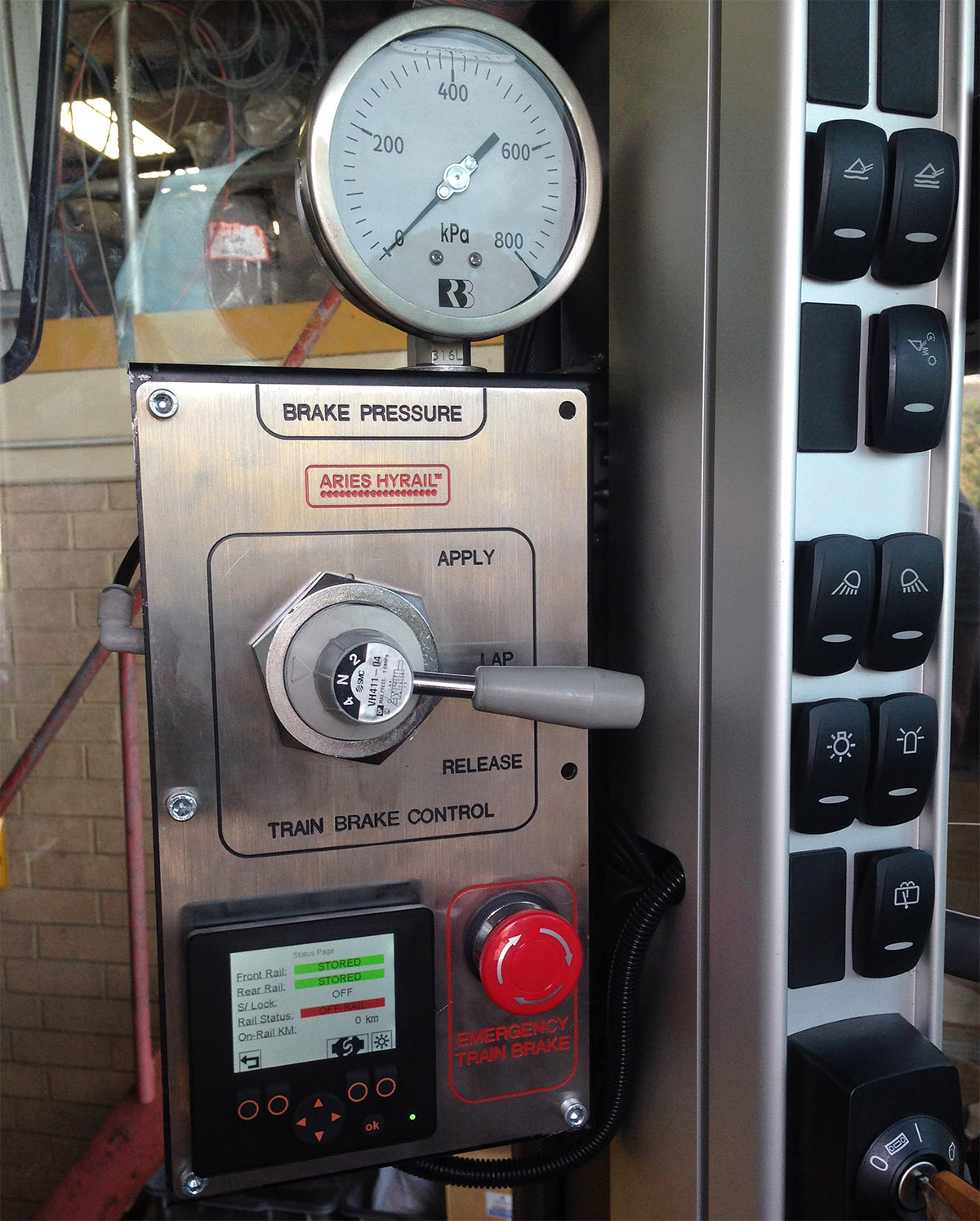
Road–rail vehicle train brake control

The road-transferable locomotive is a truck with railway wheels that can be lowered when operating on the railway tracks. It was pioneered in the early 1990s by Australian National and later refined in Victoria. The idea was to have a locomotive that could transfer from one branch line carrying mainly wheat to another parallel branch line, where the rail connection is very roundabout. The RTL suffered a number of disadvantages. Loads were severely limited when the track was steeply graded. The rubber traction wheels slipped on the steel rails when wet. The life of the rubber tires was rather short.

The Canadian company Brandt has also converted large truck tractor units for use as locomotives that can move by road to where they are needed. Still mostly used for permanent way maintenance, they can also be employed as thunderbird (rescue) locomotives or even used in normal service, where they are suitable for smaller operators.

In East Germany, some Fortschritt ZT 300 tractors were used in road–rail service.

=== Shunting ===
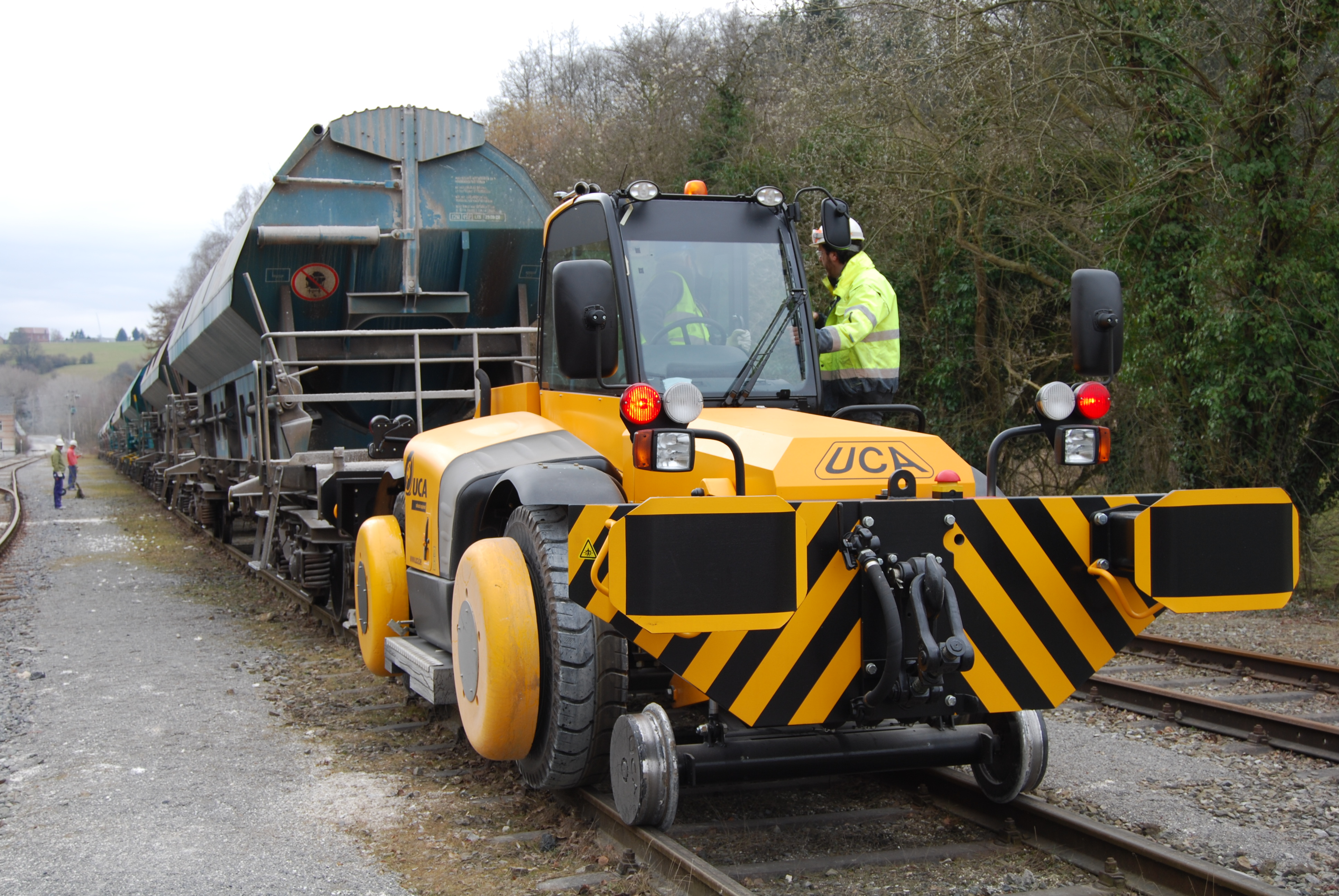
Shunting vehicle UCA-TRAC B16

Road–rail vehicles also serve as motive power for shunting (switching), the process of sorting items of rolling stock into complete trains or the reverse.

In Belgium, the company UCA produces the UCA-TRAC, road–rail vehicles based on the chassis of a JCB Load-All (UCA-TRAC B) and JCB Fastrac (UCA-TRAC F). The UCA-TRAC provides traction through its rubber wheels and is designed to act as a rail car mover.

In Australia, similar vehicles are built by Aries Rail using Volvo loaders and AUSA telehandlers. The vehicles can be used for other purposes such as shovelling or forklifting when they do not operate on-rail.

Such vehicles often have cabin-mounted controls for the railway air brake system so that the driver can apply and release the train brakes during shunting manoeuvres. To charge the train brake air hose, an air compressor needs to be fitted to the road–rail vehicle.

=== Unimog road–railer ===
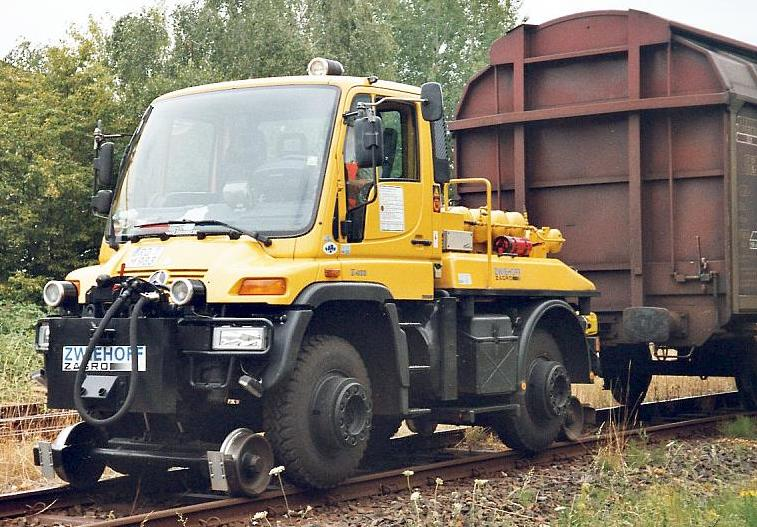
Unimog two-way vehicle

The Unimog road–railer is used for maintenance and shunting tasks. It can pull up to 1000 t and operate a snow cutter. Unimog can drive on standard gauge, as well as various international broad gauges, with its own wheels. The mechanical engine power of the Unimog is 160 kW and it achieves a speed of 90 km/h on roads and 50 km/h on rails. It needs a leveled area 5 m long for a rail/road changeover.

== Maintenance ==
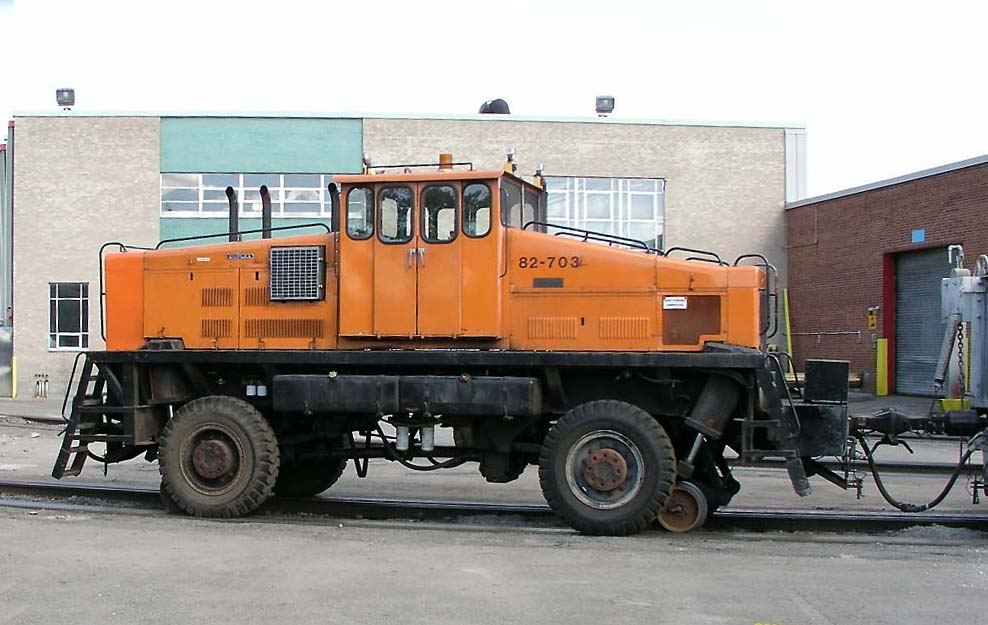
Old Montreal Metro maintenance tractor

=== Rolling stock maintenance ===
Self-propelled maintenance vehicles for maintenance of the track and for shunting wagons are much more convenient to use if they can transfer to the road to reposition or otherwise get out of the way. Because relatively light loads are involved, the problems plaguing the road-transferable locomotive are avoided.

An example would be a forklift truck fitted with railway wheels and a coupling with which to shunt a wagon or two.

In Belgium, the company UCA bvba has been constructing road–rail vehicles since 1981. UCA started with converting WF-trac and MB-trac for rail traction uses. It built rail car movers, shunting locotractors, and other road–rail vehicles. Best known is the UCA-TRAC, based on the chassis of a JCB Load-All (UCA-TRAC B) and Fastrac (UCA-TRAC F). The UCA-TRAC provides traction through its rubber wheels.

== Safety issues ==
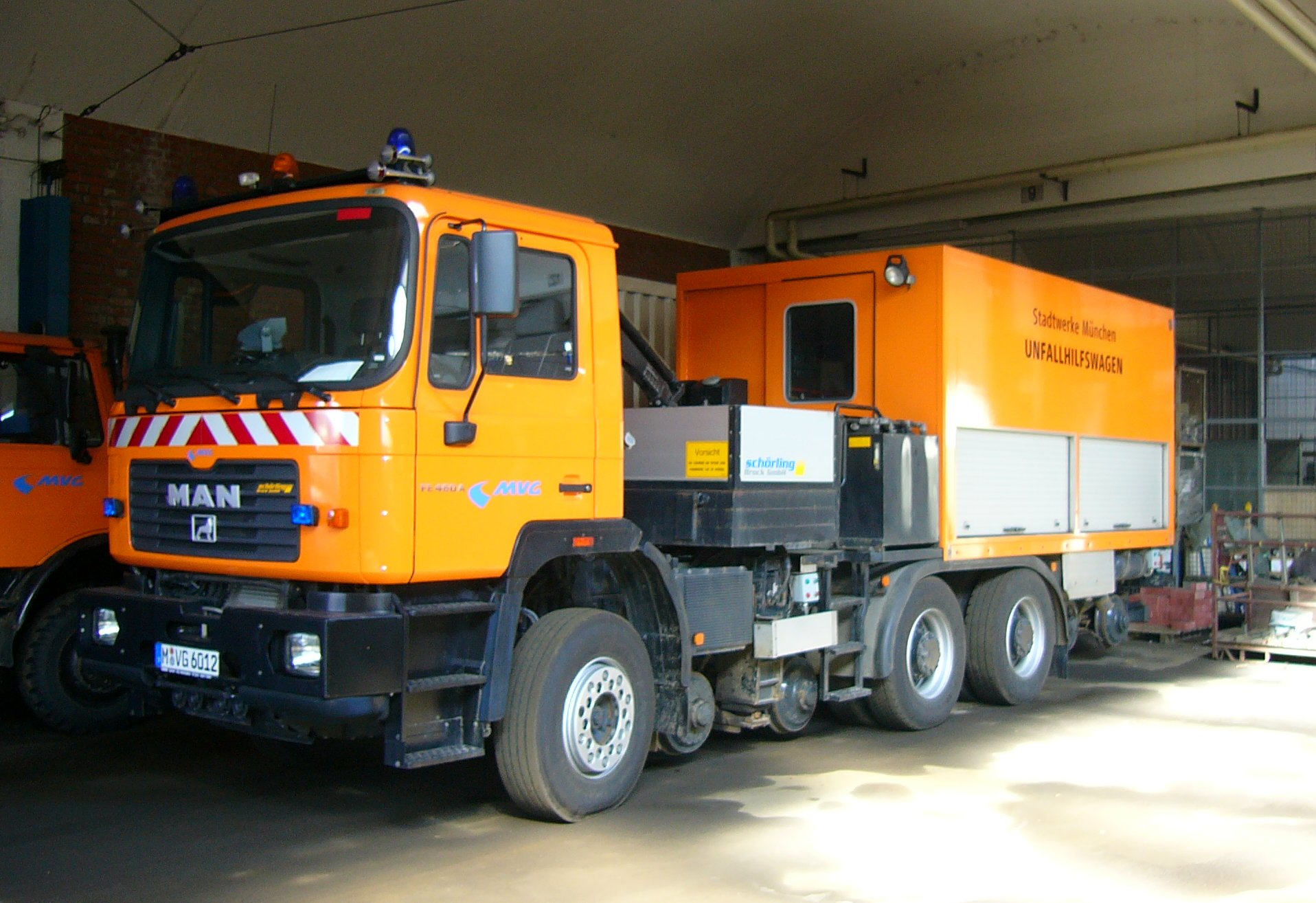
MAN heavy technical assistance shunting vehicle truck with a crane and drawbar for trams

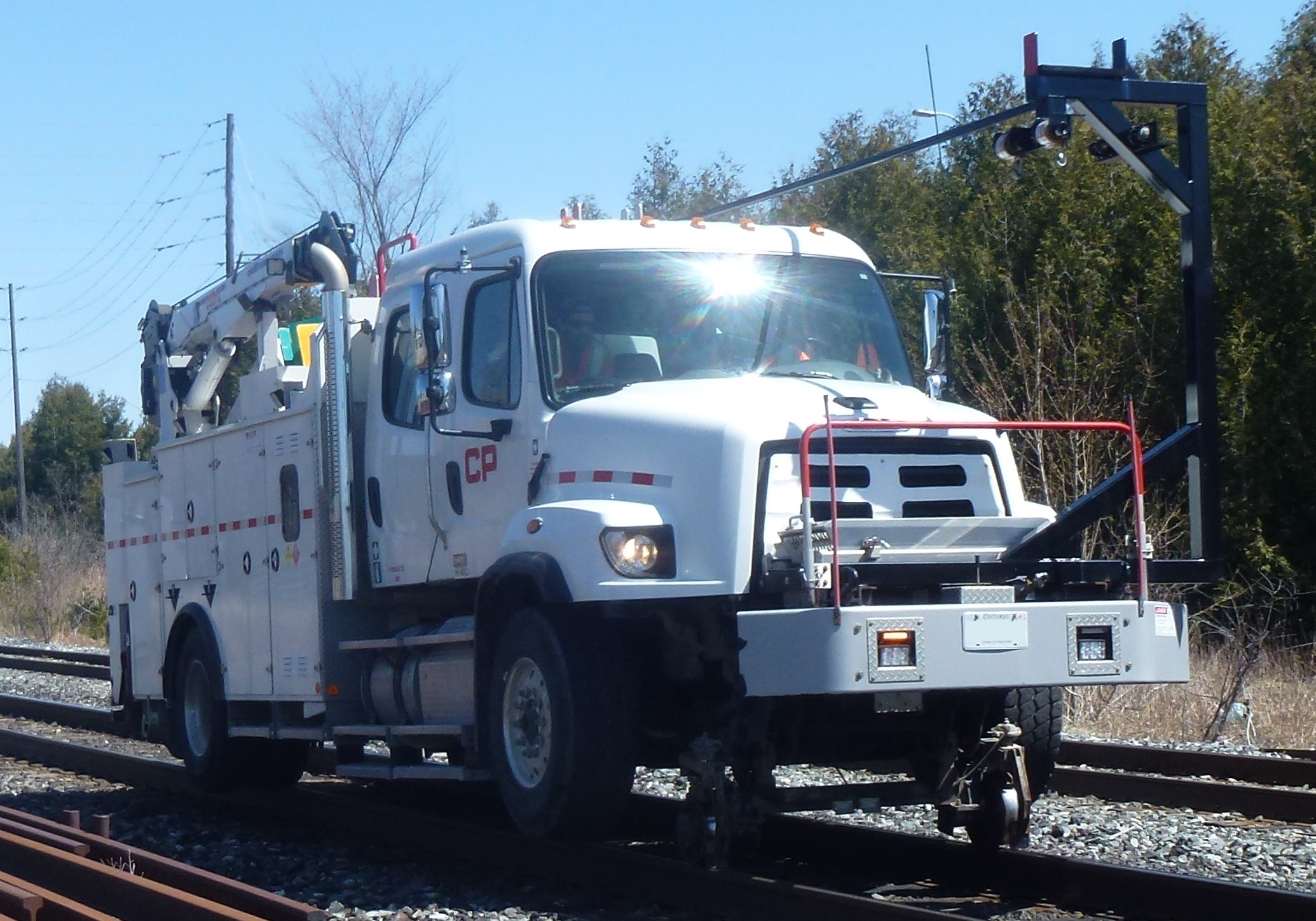
This road–rail truck's forward rail wheels lift its forward road wheels up off the track, leaving only the two inner back wheels on the rails.

Road–rail vehicles, particularly those used for inspection purposes, have been involved in a number of serious incidents, including deaths. There has been ongoing discussion regarding maintenance and inspection standards, including load and load distribution, to minimise the risk of failures.

Factors leading to derailment include failed locking equipment, wheel failure, damaged rail wheel support systems, inappropriate tires, and uneven or overloading issues.

In the UK, technical requirements for road–rail vehicles are the subject of a Rail Industry Standard (RIS-1530-PLT). In Australia, the Rail Industry Safety and Standards Board (RISSB) is working with manufacturers and operators to produce an Australian standard to which road–rail vehicles must comply.

When operating in road-going mode, drivers have to remember that the dynamics of the vehicle will be changed due to the increased weight at the front and the rear of the chassis. Some manufacturers have developed systems that allow the rail wheels to be stored almost entirely inside the original bodywork, which moves the centre of mass closer to the road axles and greatly improves the on-road driving performance of the vehicle.

== See also ==
- Alden staRRcar
- Jenny Railcar
- Railcar mover
- Railroad speeder
- Mini Moke § Railway Mokes
