= Jeep train =

Willys MB jeeps or similar vehicles converted from road vehicles to rail vehicles

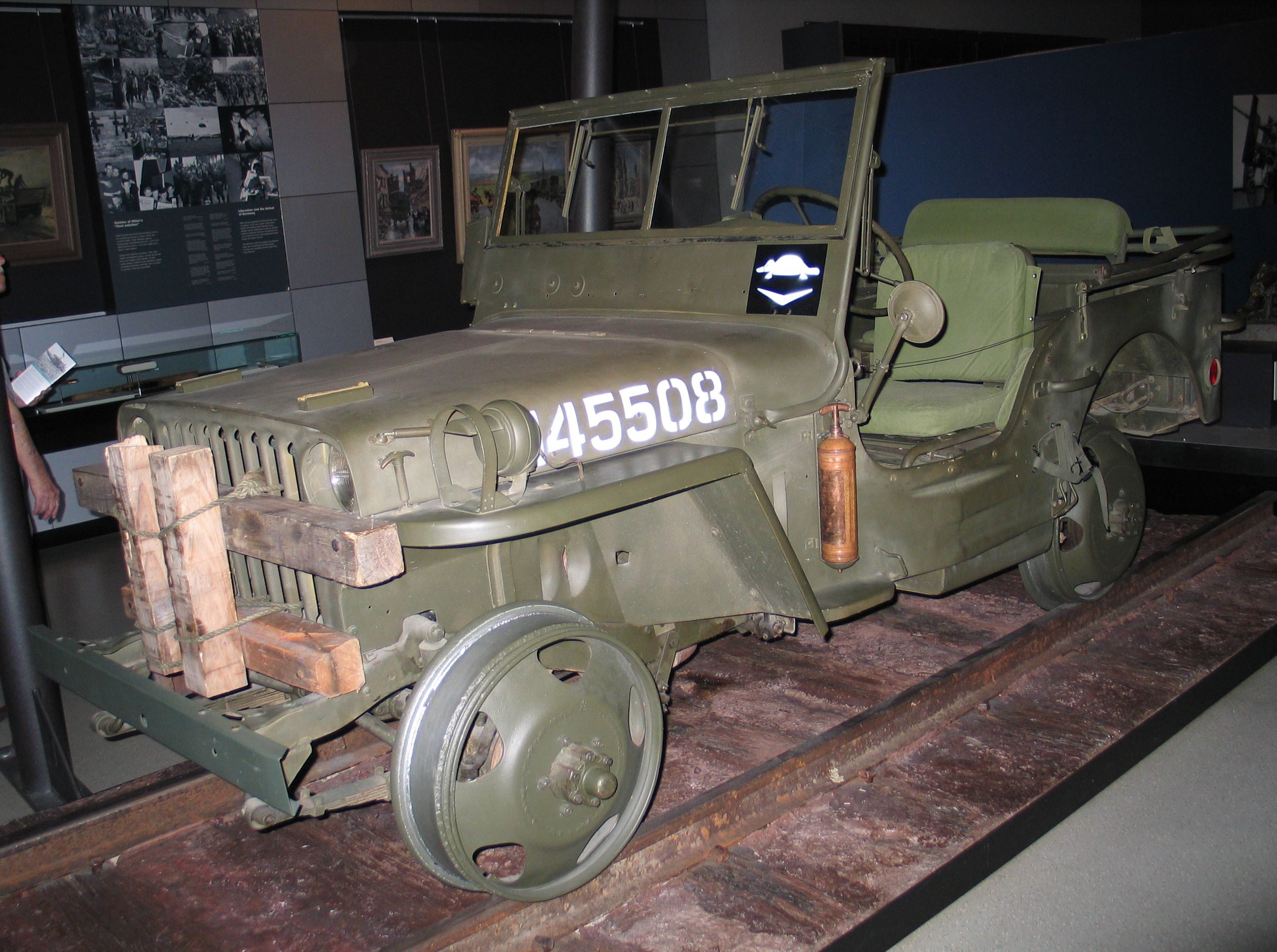
A Jeep train at the Australian War Memorial

A jeep train is a line of coupled railway vehicles hauled by a jeep fitted with railway wagon wheels instead of normal road wheels. World War II jeeps were converted from road vehicles into steel-wheeled rail switchers, shunters, light locomotives, speeders or draisines. The phrase was also used for supply trains consisting of jeeps and for columns of jeeps linked together and pulled through bad ground by tractors, though not all sources use this term in the same way.

== History ==
=== United States ===
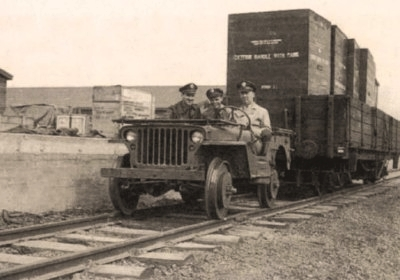
US Demonstration run on a 3 ft 6 in (1,067 mm) track at Eagle Farm Aerodrome in Brisbane, Australia on 30 June 1943. A Jeep fitted with rail wheels could easily pull 10 tons.

Adapting automobiles as gasoline railcars is recorded as early as 1912 and early publicity on Jeeps mentioned their potential use as an inspection car. The USAAF in Australia used flanged-wheel jeeps as switchers in 1943, which led to testing as road-switchers for future operations in New Guinea. Perhaps the first large-scale use of jeep as locomotive was in the CBI theatre. Eleven days after the Normandy landing, jeep speeders were in use on the continent, surveying lines for use or repair. Postwar, jeep speeders were used as inspection cars, and jeep trains used for light service, including recreation. The Jeep train at Lewis and Clark Caverns claimed to be the shortest jeep railway. Over time, hi-rail vehicles pushed dedicated speeders out of railroads; civilian jeeps were often used.

=== Australia ===
In Borneo in 1945, Australian soldiers converted jeeps to run on rails in order to compensate for the lack of locomotives on a narrow gauge railway line.

=== United Kingdom ===
The United Kingdom used railworthy Jeeps during World War II especially in France, Germany, and Burma. Jeep trains were used extensively during the Malayan Emergency.

=== France ===
French forces used rail jeeps – "jeep draisines" – including armoured rail jeeps, in Indochina, and later in the Algerian war.

== Loads and speeds ==
A jeep designed to draw 1,000 lb (450 kg) on the road could pull much greater loads on rails due to train wheels' lower rolling resistance. During Australian military operations in Borneo, jeeps hauled goods wagons with a payload of four tons of sand. In the Philippines, a jeep train hauled a total weight of 52 tons over a route 19 miles (31 km) long at a speed of 20 mph (32 km/h).

== Military use ==
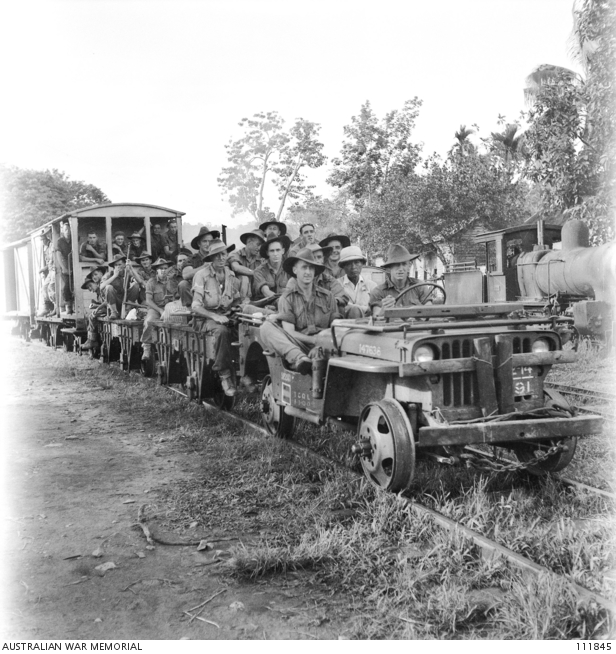
Membukut Special in Beaufort, Borneo, 1945

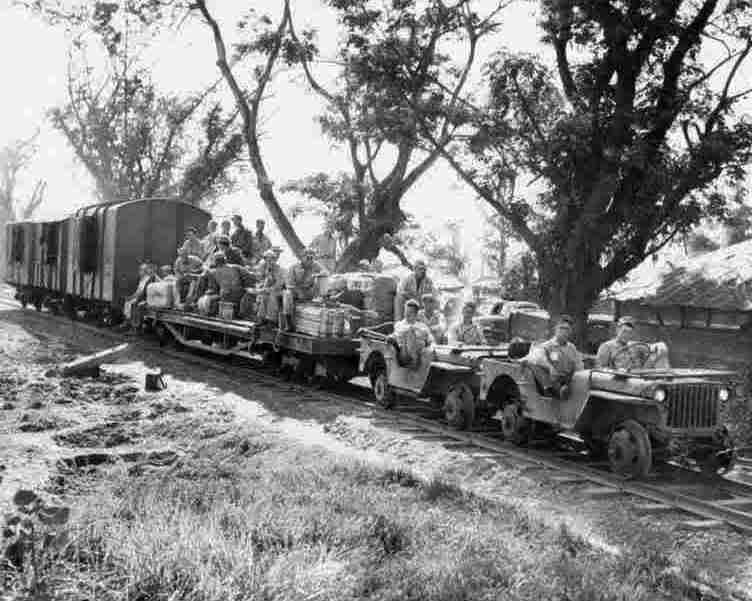
Double-heading on a long jeep train

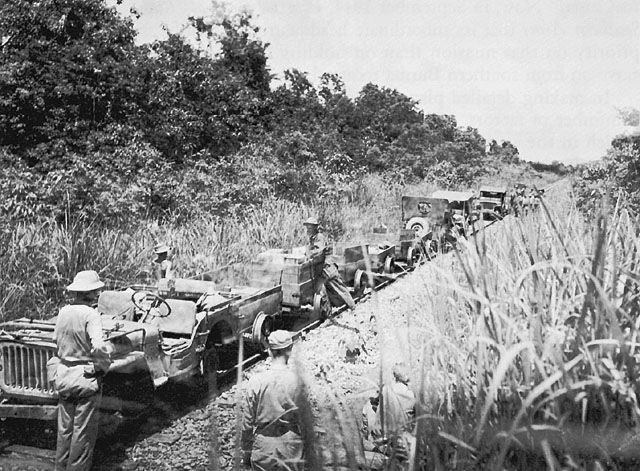
American jeep train in Burma

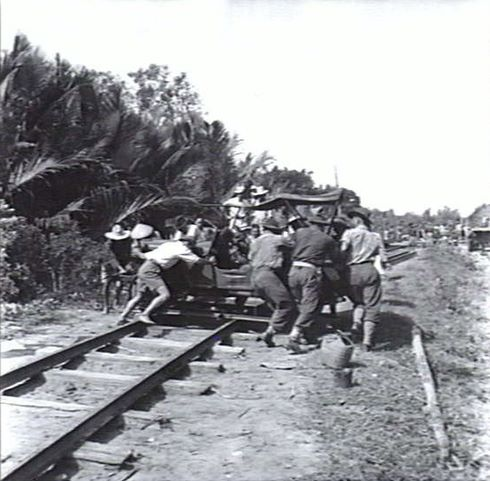
Jeep train on a portable turntable in Kimanis, Borneo

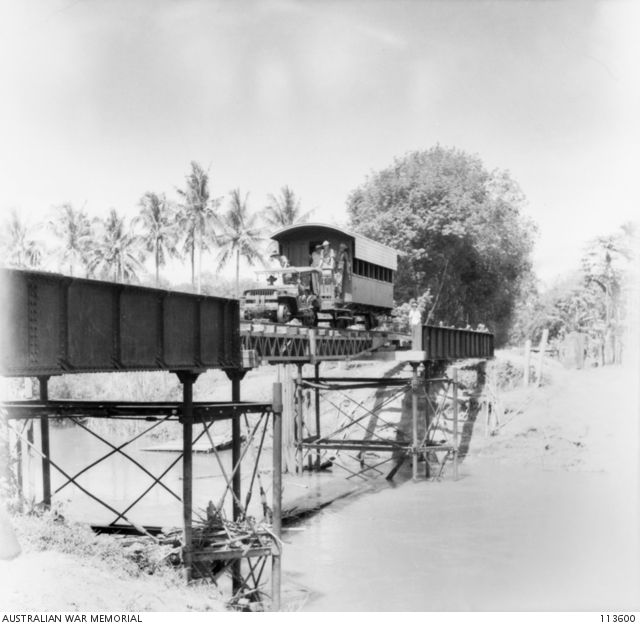
General Wootten crosses the Bongowan river

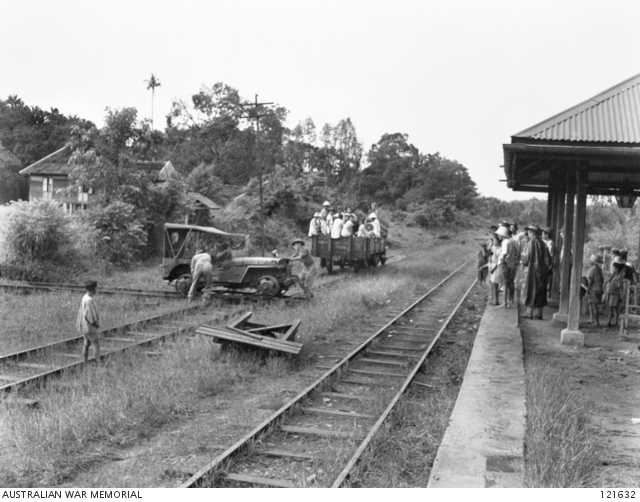
Kinarut station on the Jesselton to Papar railway

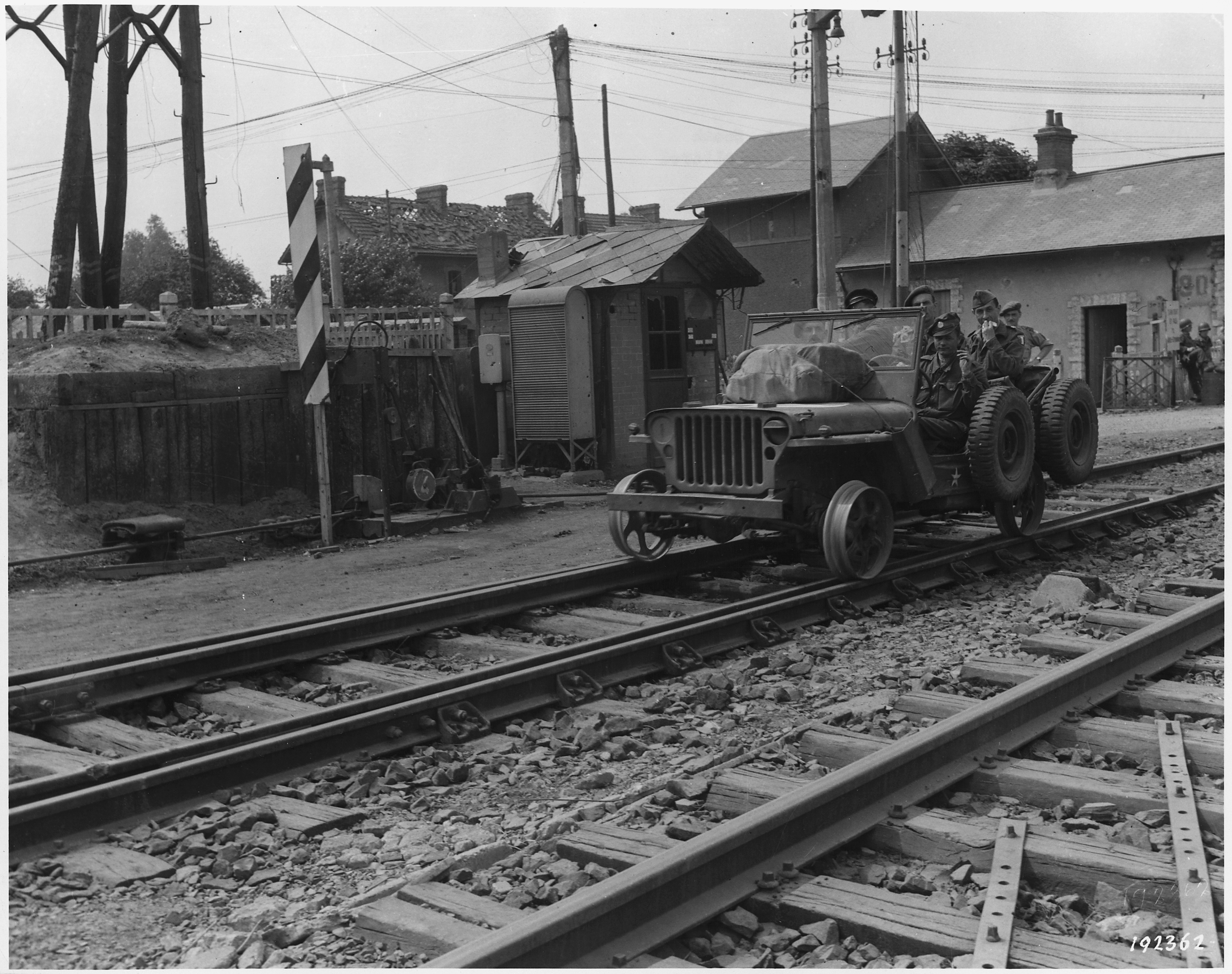
British Jeep in France, 1945

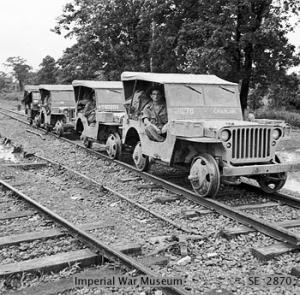
British jeeps between Myitkyina and Mogaung, Burma, 1944

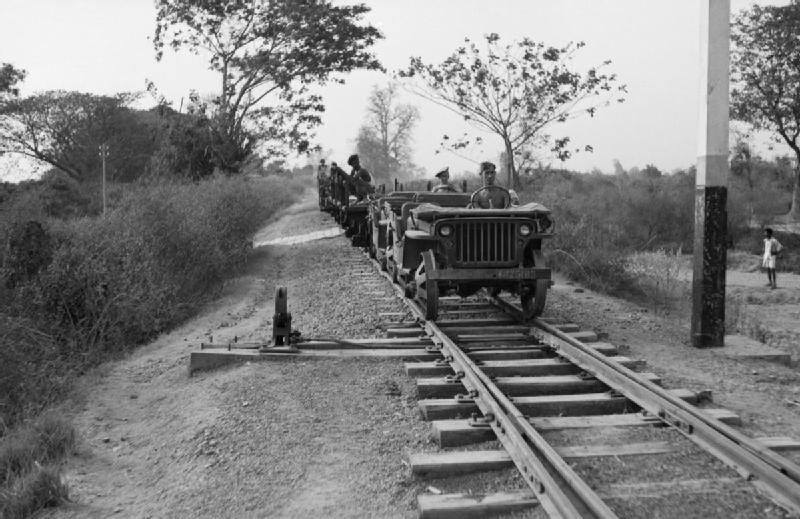
British jeeps south of Mandalay, Burma, 1945

== See also ==
- Road–rail vehicle
