= Type 95 So-Ki =

Japanese armored car

Type 95 So-Ki armored railroad car
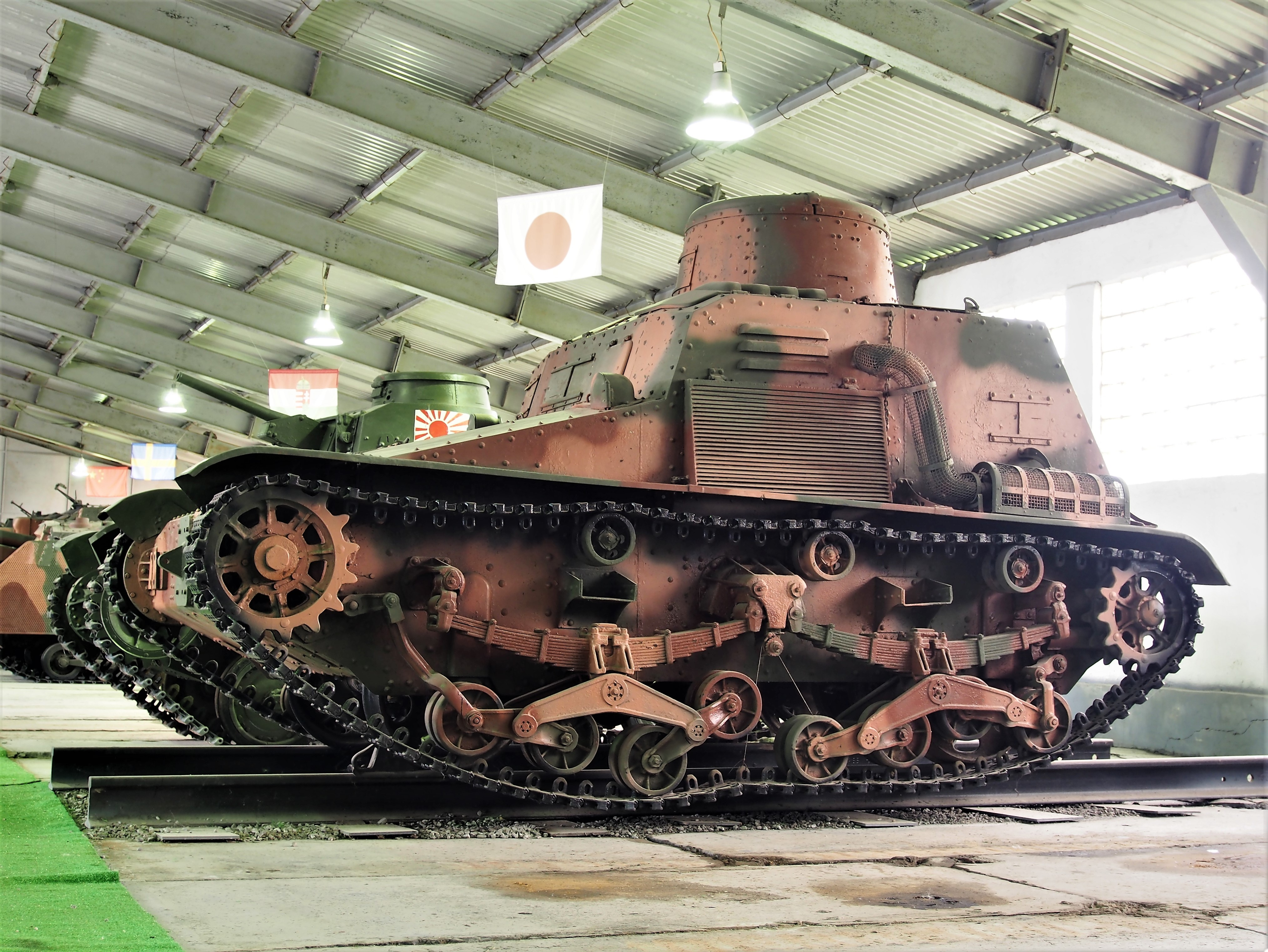
- Type 95 "So-Ki" at Kubinka Tank Museum
- Type: Armored car
- Place of origin: Empire of Japan

Production history
- No. built: 121 to 135

Specifications
- Mass: 8.7 tons
- Length: 4.9m
- Width: 2.56m
- Height: 2.54m (on rail line); 2.43 (on road)
- Crew: 6
- Engine: gasoline (petrol); 84 hp
- Suspension: wheeled or bellcrank
- Maximum speed: (rail line) 72 km/h; (ground) 30 km/h

The Type 95 So-Ki was an armored railroad car of the Imperial Japanese Army. It was used for patrolling and guarding railway lines in both Manchuria and Burma. The chassis was based on the Type 95 Ha-Go light tank. The Type 95 So-Ki had light armor and no fixed weapons armament. Hand-held weapons by the crew would be the only armament available. It had a simple suspension system with bogie wheels suspended on bellcranks on each side of the chassis. The tracks were driven through the front sprockets. There were three small return wheels.

The Type 95 So-Ki was unique as it had both a track and wheel drive system. The vehicle could be changed between railway line wheels mode and track mode for ground use within a few minutes time as it had retractable wheels. In addition, the width of the wheels could be adjusted to the various widths of the rail gauges.

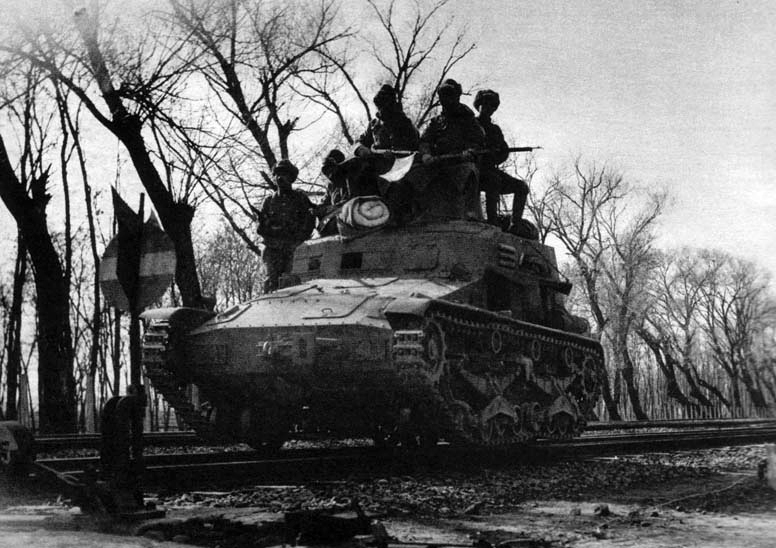
Type 95 So-Ki with mounted crew

The Type 95 So-Ki was produced between 1935 and 1943, with 121 to 135 units built.
