= LMS Karrier Ro-Railer =

Road-rail vehicle

The London, Midland and Scottish Railway (LMS) Karrier Ro-Railer was a British experimental road-rail (rail)bus built by Karrier in 1931. Its road registration was UR7924. Based on a Karrier Chaser bus with Cravens bodywork, it could run on the road on tyres or on standard gauge track. It had a 6-cylinder petrol engine.

Initially used on the Nickey Line, a branch line running from Hemel Hempstead to Harpenden, it was transferred to Stratford-on-Avon in 1932 for services from Stratford Old Town railway station to the Welcombe Hotel. The front axle broke after only a few weeks service. Finally it became a vehicle used to transport track ballast on the West Highland Line.

== See also ==
- Railroad bus
