= Rapid response vehicle =

Rapid response vehicle can mean:

- Nontransporting EMS vehicle, particularly in the New South Wales Ambulance Service and most UK ambulance and air ambulance services
- Fast Response Car
- A police car equipped for pursuit, particularly in the Italian Carabinieri
