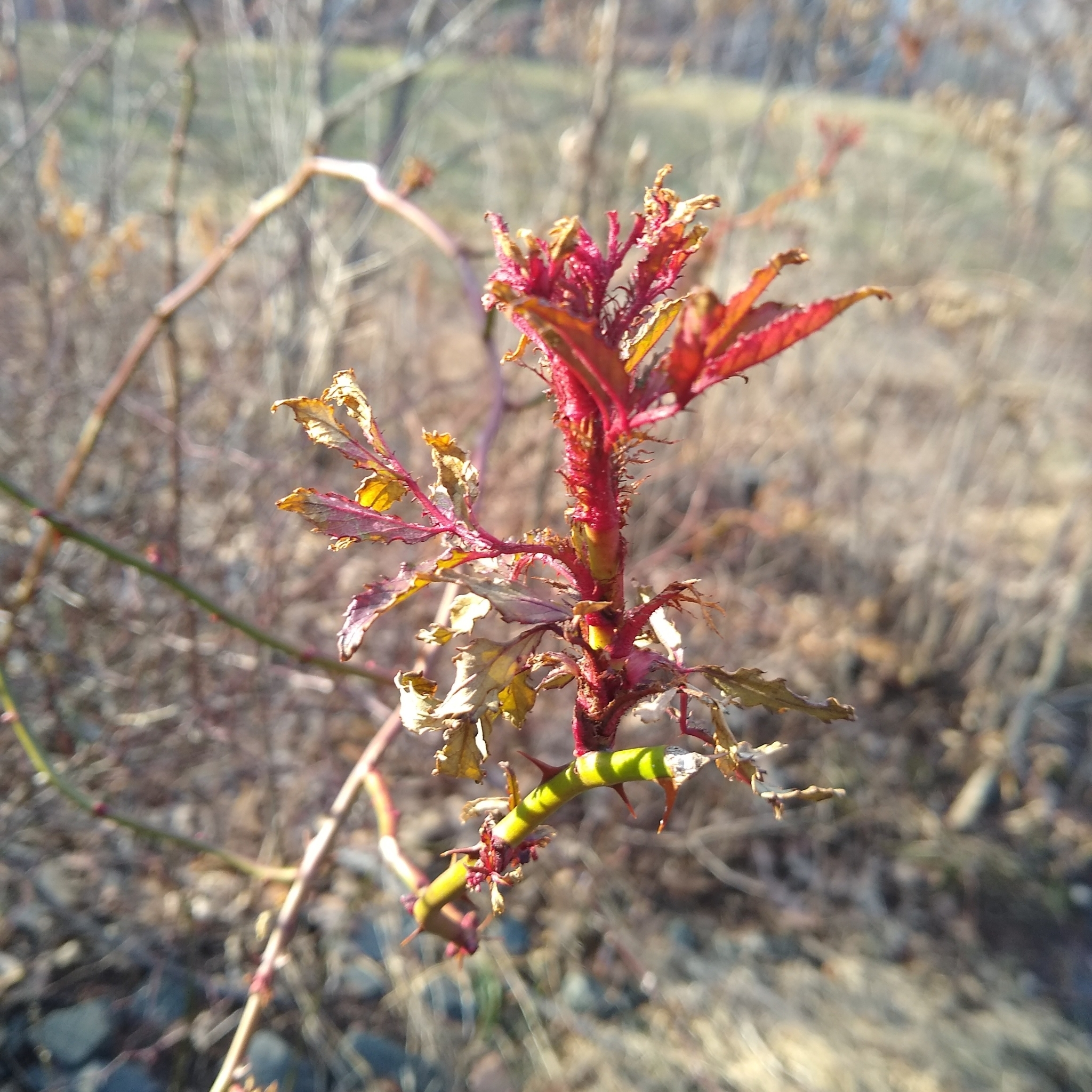

Virus classification
- (unranked): Virus
- Realm: Riboviria
- Kingdom: Orthornavirae
- Phylum: Negarnaviricota
- Class: Bunyaviricetes
- Order: Elliovirales
- Family: Fimoviridae
- Genus: Emaravirus
- Species: Emaravirus rosae

= Rose rosette virus =

Species of virus

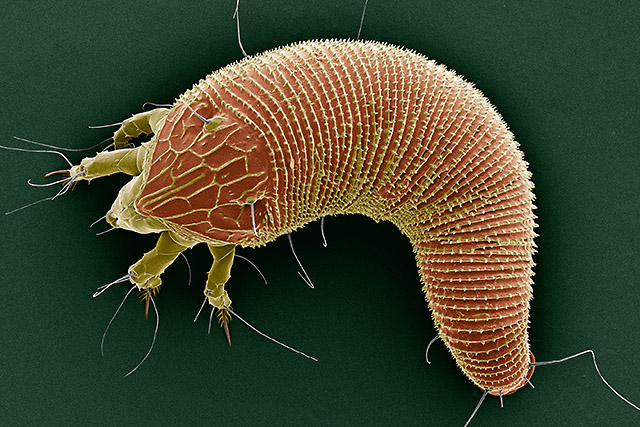
Electromicrograph of Phyllocoptes fructiphilus, the vector of Rose rosette virus

Rose rosette virus (RRV) is a negative sense RNA virus species of virus in the genus Emaravirus. It is known to infect roses (Rosa spp.), in which it causes witch's broom and sometimes excessive growth of prickles. The virus is transmitted by a microscopic Eriophyid mite Phyllocoptes fructiphilus. The disease takes 3–4 years to properly phenotype and thus is a hard disease to breed resistance to the virus. Breeding work began with cultivar resistance trials and then morphed into bi-parental and interconnected populations for mapping disease resistance. Recently there have been the first two studies identifying loci for resistance on both the diploid and tetraploid level using mapping populations developed at Texas A&M University Rose Breeding and Genetics Program. On the diploid level, QTL were found on linkage groups (LGs) 1, 3, 5, and 6 and on the tetraploid level, QTL were found on LGs 5, 6, and 7.
