= Sir Richard Cooper, 1st Baronet =

Sir Richard Powell Cooper, 1st Baronet

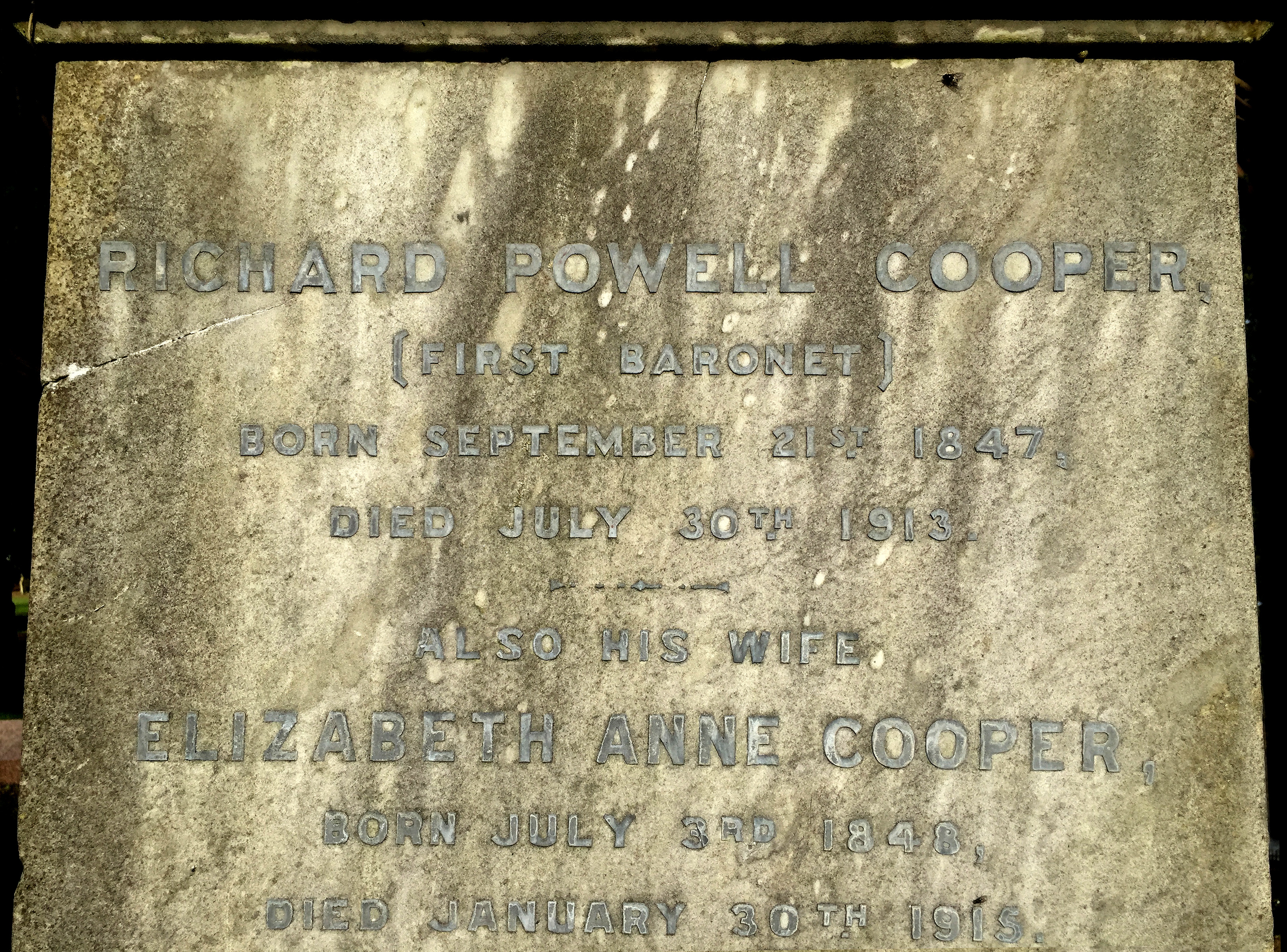
Monument to the Cooper Family in Rectory Lane Cemetery, Berkhamsted, Hertfordshire

Sir Richard Powell Cooper, 1st Baronet (21 September 1847 – 30 July 1913) was a British industrial entrepreneur. He was a member of the Royal College of Veterinary Surgeons and inherited the family business, an agricultural chemical manufacturing company. Following his success, he was made a baronet for services to industry.

Richard Cooper was a nephew of William Cooper, an agricultural veterinary surgeon who established the firm of Cooper and Nephews at Berkhamsted, Hertfordshire in 1852. The company manufactured chemicals and exported pedigree live stock, and found success when it developed and manufactured the first effective sheep dip. Cooper's Dip was a highly successful venture and was exported worldwide. Upon the death of William in 1885, Richard inherited the business from his uncle.

Richard lived at Shenstone Court, Staffordshire, and was High Sheriff of Staffordshire in 1901 and Deputy Lieutenant of that county. In 1905 he was created 1st Baronet Cooper of Shenstone Court by King Edward VII. In the 1890s, he invested his wealth in developing the town of Frinton-on-Sea, Essex, as a high-class seaside resort.

Richard Powell Cooper married Elizabeth Ashmole in 1872. In 1898, their eldest son, Richard Ashmole Cooper, became a partner in the family firm. Following his father's death in 1913, the younger Richard took over the family business. He later merged the company with McDougall and Robertson Ltd, and the new company became Cooper McDougall Robertson Ltd.

Richard Powell Cooper was buried in the Cooper family grave in the Cemetery of St Peter's Church on Rectory Lane, Berkhamsted.

== See also ==
- Cooper baronets

Baronetage of the United Kingdom
| New creation | Baronet (of Shenstone Court); 1905–1913 | Succeeded by Richard Cooper |
