= Ashlyns Hall =

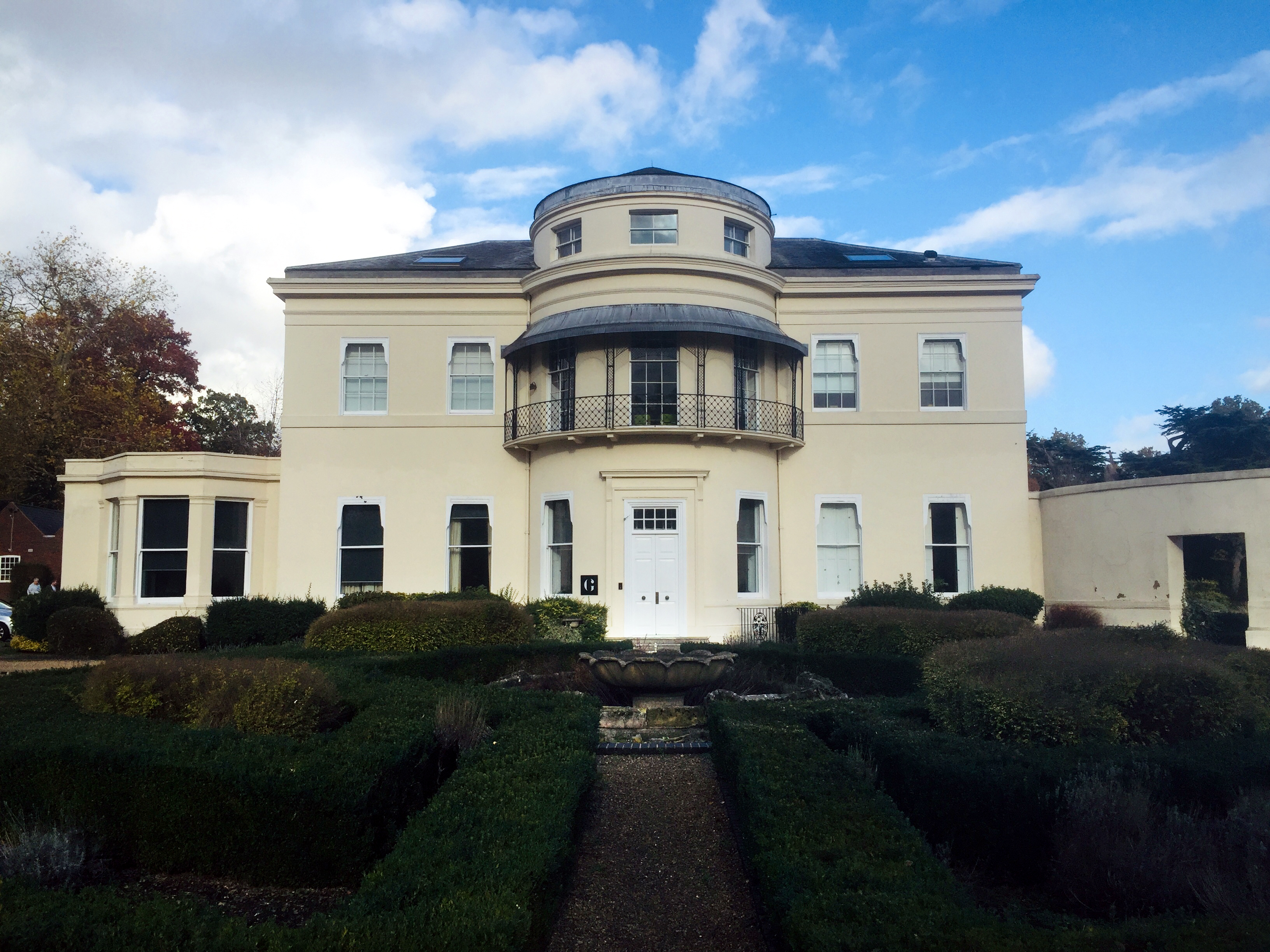
- Ashlyns Hall from the garden

- Location within Hertfordshire

General information
- Type: English country house
- Architectural style: Regency/Neoclassical
- Location: Chesham Road, Berkhamsted HP4 2ST, Berkhamsted, United Kingdom
- Coordinates: 51.75015°N 0.56498°W
- Completed: 1800
- Client: James Smith
- Owner: The Gap Partnership

Design and construction
- Designations: Grade II* listed building

Ashlyns Hall is a country house at the edge of Berkhamsted in Hertfordshire, England. It is a Grade II* listed building.

== History ==
The earliest local records of the Ashlyn name occur in a document dating from 1314 which describes a Reginal Asselyn, who gave his name to a house lying east of Brickhill Green. No further records of this property exist until the Stuart period, when it was the dwelling of Francis Wethered, Comptroller of the King's Works to King Charles II. The old house that stood on the site of the present hall was sold in 1764 along with it garden, 200 acres of farmland, two orchards and additional forest land.

The present hall was built around 1800 for James Smith. He was a member of a banking family, and his ancestor, Thomas Smith had founded Smith's Bank in Nottingham in 1699. Ashlyns Hall was situated on a plateau that stretches between Berkhamsted and Wigginton, an area that was once occupied by a number of influential country estates — Ashlyns Hall, Haresfoot, Rossway and Champneys. The houses were all in close proximity to a major coaching route along Akeman Street, offering convenient access to London.

James Smith's first wife died, and his second marriage was to Mary Isablella Pechell of Berkhamsted Place. They had five children, the second of whom, Augustus, was born at Ashlyns Hall in 1804. Augustus Smith later went on to become Member of Parliament for Truro and the first Lord Proprietor of the Isles of Scilly. Augustus Smith became well known in Berkhamsted for his philanthropy; in particular, his opposition to Lord Brownlow's attempt to enclose common land for private use is well known, when, in 1866, he hired a gang of men from the East End of London to forcibly remove Brownlow's fencing, in an event that became known as "The Battle of Berkhamsted Common".

Robert Algernon Smith, the younger brother of Augustus, married into another banking family, the Dorriens who lived at neighbouring Haresfoot house. His bride, Mary Anne Drever, was the granddaughter of George Dorrien, Governor of the Bank of England 1818 to 1820. Robert and Mary took the name Smith-Dorrien, and together they had fifteen children, among them Thomas and Horace.

The Ashlyns estate was later acquired in 1859 by William Longman, son of the publisher Thomas Longman who founded the Longman publishing company.

In 1930 a large part of the estate, to the North of the hall, was sold off to the children's charity The Foundling Hospital, which was moving out of London, and a large new Neo-Georgian school building was erected on the land. After 1951, the Foundling Hospital closed its Berkhamsted premises and this building became Ashlyns School.

Ashlyns Hall continued to be used as a private house on the remainder of the estate. It was the property of the Smith-Dorrien family, and was let out to a succession of tenants. Between c.1877 and 1896 the estate was let to a Colonel Lucas. From 1896 until 1911 Ashlyns Hall estate was let to the chemical manufacturer and politician, Richard Ashmole Cooper of the Cooper Baronets, of Shenstone Court. Subsequently, the lease was taken up by A.J. Ryder in 1912, and in 1919, Ashlyns Hall was leased to Gerald Kingsley.

In 1990, Ashlyns Hall was sold and converted for use as offices for the Shanning Group. Another section of the estate, the former kitchen garden to the West of the hall, was sold off to establish Ashlyns Care Home in around 2000. The hall itself is currently occupied by The Gap Partnership.

== Architecture and estate ==
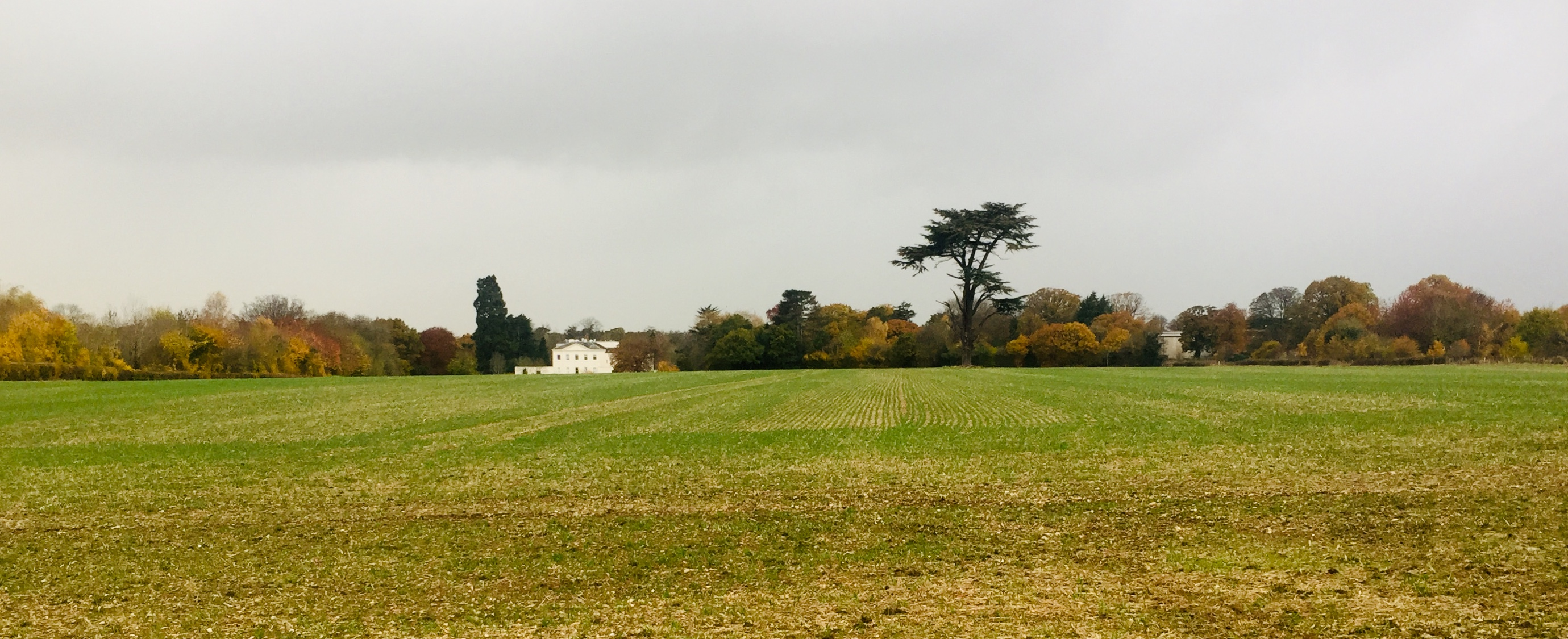
Ashlyns Hall in the estate grounds

Ashlyns Hall, is a modestly sized villa from the early Regency. It has two storeys and the exterior is covered in stucco. On the south-western side, the house features a semi-circular bowed front with a first-floor verandah of wrought iron overlooking ornamental gardens. A new wing on the north-eastern side was added around 1930. The interior features a circular entrance hall and a fine staircase. Adjacent to the house is a block of 18th-century stables built in red brick.

The surrounding estate consists of pasture fields and parkland that features large, mature wellingtonia and cedar trees. Since 1993, the parkland has been bisected by the A41 bypass cutting.
