= Sir Richard Cooper, 2nd Baronet =

British politician (1874-1946)

Sir Richard Ashmole Cooper, 2nd Baronet (11 August 1874 – 5 March 1946) was a British politician and a member of the Cooper Baronets, of Shenstone Court.

== Biography ==
Cooper was educated at Clifton College, and succeeded to the baronetcy in 1913. He was Chairman of the chemical manufacturing firm Cooper, McDougall & Robertson.

He served in the Staffordshire Yeomanry (Queen's Own Royal Regiment), where he was appointed a lieutenant 26 March 1902.

He was elected as Member of Parliament (MP) for Walsall in January 1910 general election, a seat he would hold until 1922. He founded the National Party with Sir Henry Page Croft in 1917 but stood at the 1918 election as an Independent Conservative. He was prominent, along with Croft, in the campaign against the Prime Minister David Lloyd George in July 1922 for selling honours.

Between 1896 and 1911, Cooper resided at Ashlyns Hall in Berkhamsted, leased from the Smith-Dorrien family.

He married Alice Priestland on 18 April 1900: the couple had three sons, including the 3rd and 4th Baronets. Cooper died in 1946 and is interred in the family vault in Rectory Lane Cemetery, Berkhamsted.

== Family ==
Cooper married Alice Priestland in 1900.

Parliament of the United Kingdom
Preceded by Edward Marten Dunne	Member of Parliament for Walsall; Jan. 1910–1922	Succeeded by Pat Collins
Baronetage of the United Kingdom
Preceded by Richard Cooper	Baronet (of Shenstone Court); 1913–1946	Succeeded by William Cooper
