= Travertine Hot Springs =

Geothermal mineral springs near Bridgeport, California, USA

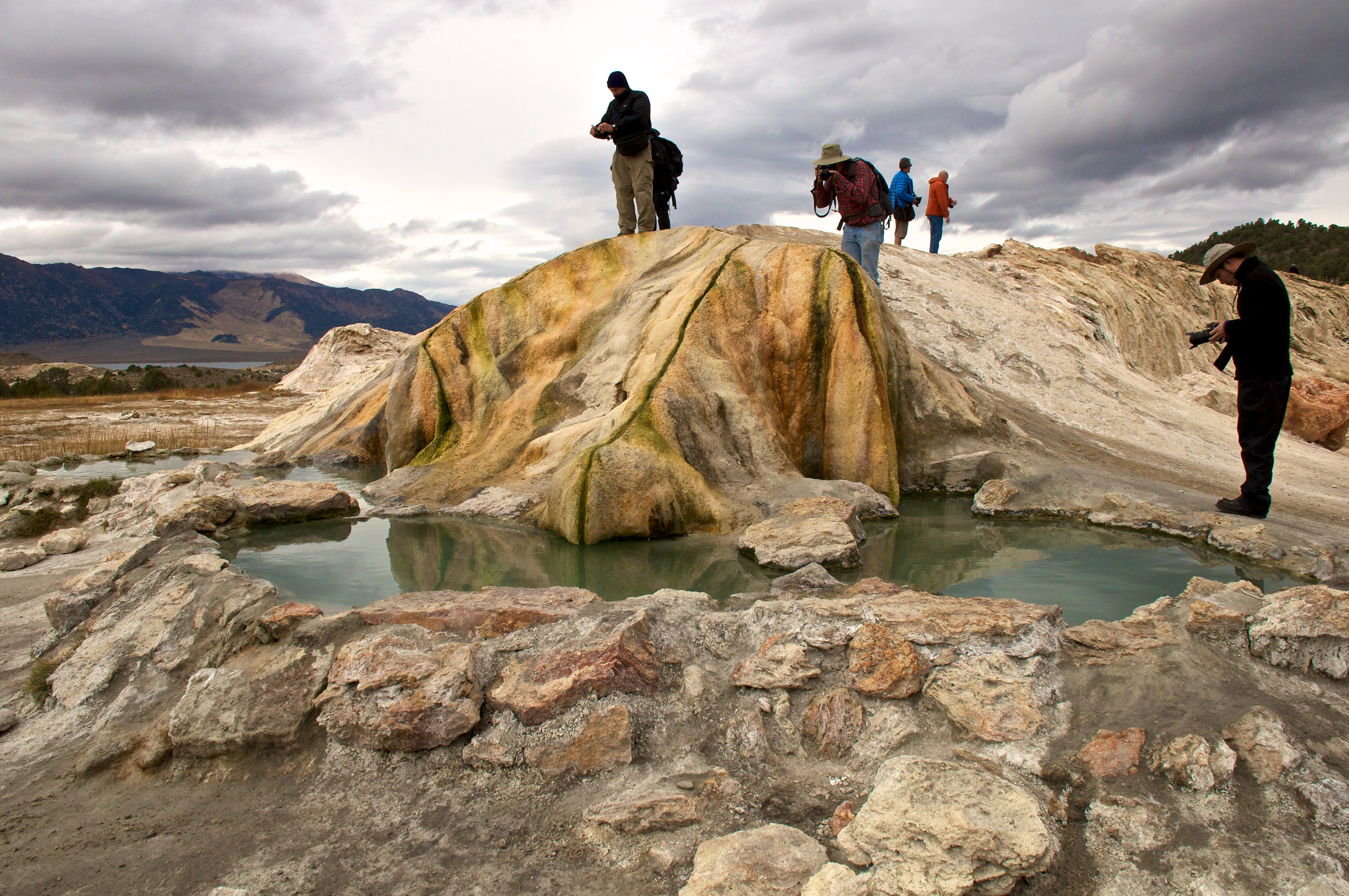
- Interactive map of Travertine Hot Springs
- Location: near Bridgeport, Mono County, California
- Coordinates: 38°14′44″N 119°12′19″W
- Elevation: 6,700 ft (2,000 m)
- Type: geothermal spring
- Temperature: 180 °F (82 °C)

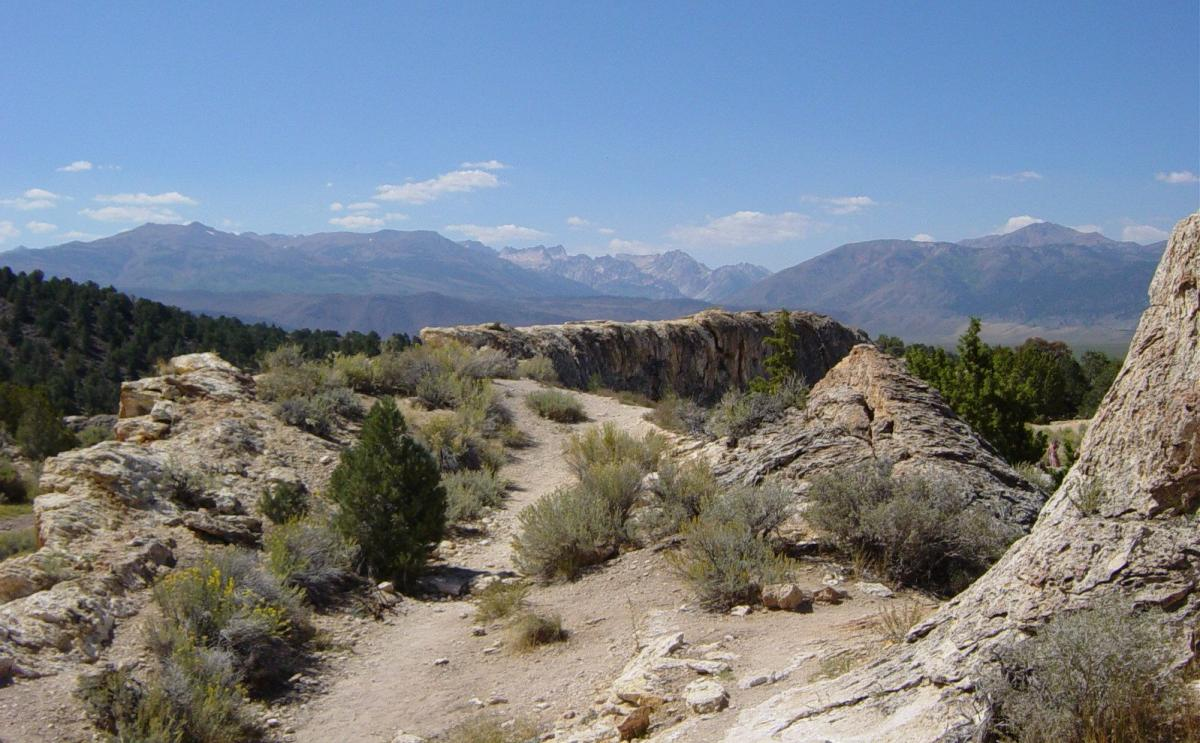
Trail to Travertine Hot Springs

Travertine Hot Springs are a group of geothermal mineral springs located near the town of Bridgeport, California, United States.

== Geography ==
Travertine Hot Springs are located two miles Southeast of Bridgeport, California on several sizeable travertine terraces, overlooking views of the High Sierra mountains. Volunteers have built a series of primitive rock pools and wood-and-concrete enclosures to contain the water, and to control temperature by diverting the flow through stepped channels. The springs are located on California State Park land.

== Geology ==
According to David Risley, a geologist with the U.S. Forest Service, the hot springs gets its name from the build-up of calcium carbonate (a form of limestone) that forms the mineral terraces. In the mid-1890s, 60 tons of travertine was mined from the site to build the interior facings of San Francisco City Hall, and other buildings.

== History ==
For hundreds of years the hot mineral springs were used by local indigenous people and later, early settlers. According to archaeological records, Paleo-Indians used thermal springs in the American west for 10,000 years, based on evidence of human use and settlements. Hot springs provided warmth, healing mineral water, and cleansing. Later, the Paiute people used the hot springs.

In the early 1900s, the first wood-lined pool for dipping sheep was built; some of the wooden planks currently at the site are the original boards.

== Water profile ==
The hot mineral water emerges from several geothermal fissures in the ground at 180°F (82°C) and are cooled to 115°–156°F as they progress through the travertine terraces. Due to underground movement caused local and regional earthquakes, the temperature fluctuates.

== See also ==
- List of hot springs in the United States
- List of hot springs in the world
