= D'Arcy Cooper =

Sir Francis D'Arcy Cooper, 1st Baronet (17 November 1882 – 18 December 1941) was a British businessman and accountant. He was chairman of Lever Brothers and Unilever.

== Early life and education ==
Cooper was born in St Pancras, London, the son of chartered accountant Francis Cooper and Ada Frances Power. He was educated privately and at Wellington College.

== Career ==
After a year abroad in Paris, Cooper returned home in 1899 to join the family accounting firm, Cooper Brothers and Co. The firm served as auditors of Lever Brothers from the company's founding in 1885. In 1910, Cooper was made a partner in the family firm.

After the start of the First World War, Cooper enlisted in the Yeomanry in early 1915, and within three months was gazetted to a commission in the Royal Field Artillery. He was wounded in August 1916 during the Battle of the Somme and spent a year recovering in the hospital. He spent the remainder of the war employed by the War Office. In January 1919, he returned to the family firm.

In 1923, he was elected to the board of Lever Brothers as joint vice-chairman. He succeeded company founder William Lever, 1st Viscount Leverhulme as chairman on 15 May 1925 after his death.

Cooper served as a member of the Prime Minister's Industrial Advisory Panel on Rearmament prior to the Second World War. Since the beginning of the war to his death, he served on the Board of Trade. In the 1941 Birthday Honours, he was created a baronet, of Singleton. Through his international business dealings, he was also a Commander of the Order of the Crown of Belgium and a Knight of the First Class of the Order of St. Olav of Norway.

== Personal life ==
In 1913, he married Evelyn Hilda Mary Radford.

In 1939, he suffered from a serious illness and never recovered his former health, though he continued to work. He died aged 59 in West Ridge, Reigate, Surrey. With no sons, the baronetcy became extinct upon his death.

Baronetage of the United Kingdom
New creation	Baronet (of Singleton); 1941	Extinct
