= William Cooper (chemical manufacturer) =

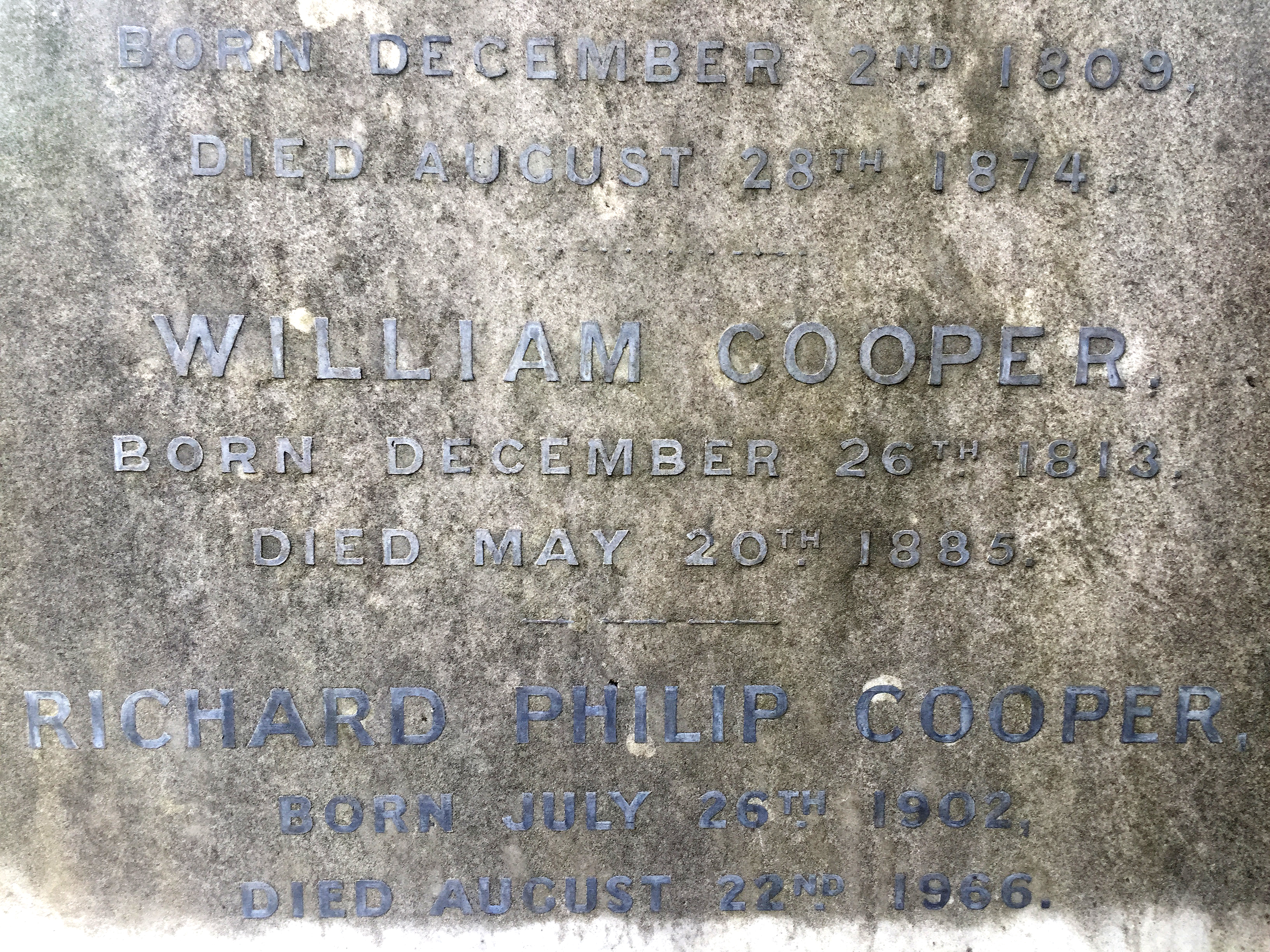
Grave of William Cooper in Berkhamsted

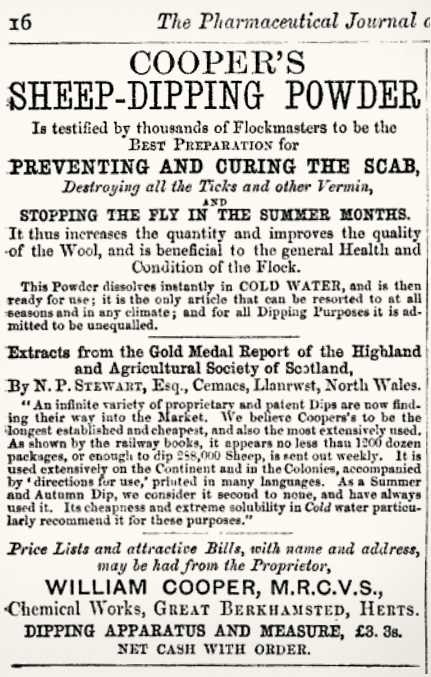
Coopers sheep dip advert 1871

William Cooper (26 December 1813 – 20 May 1885) was a British veterinary surgeon, agriculturalist and industrialist who specialised in the manufacture of agricultural insecticides for livestock. He is credited with developing the first successful sheep dip, Cooper's Dip, in 1852.

== Early life and career ==
Cooper was born in Clunbury, Shropshire. He trained as a veterinary surgeon and by the 1843 he had moved to set up a practice in Berkhamsted, Hertfordshire. Legend has it that he arrived in town with nothing but a bag with containing the tools of his trade. In 1849, Cooper became one of the first veterinary surgeons to qualify from the Royal College of Veterinary Surgeons. In the 1851 census he is recorded as a resident of the High Street in Berkhamstead. He later moved to a house on the High Street called The Poplars; this house was later the birthplace of the actor Sir Michael Hordern in 1911.

As a veterinary surgeon he was frequently confronted by the horrendous condition of farm animals caused by various parasitic insects, in particular a skin disease which afflicted sheep known as sheep scab - at the time treated very ineffectually by only ointments composed of tobacco stalk and sulphur emulsified in goose fat. Cooper began to conduct his own experiments with preparations of arsenic and sulphur. By 1852 his experiments were conclusive enough for him to market the first truly effective sheep dip, known as "Cooper's dip". The product was sold in a powdered form which was easily transportable.

== Cooper & Nephews ==
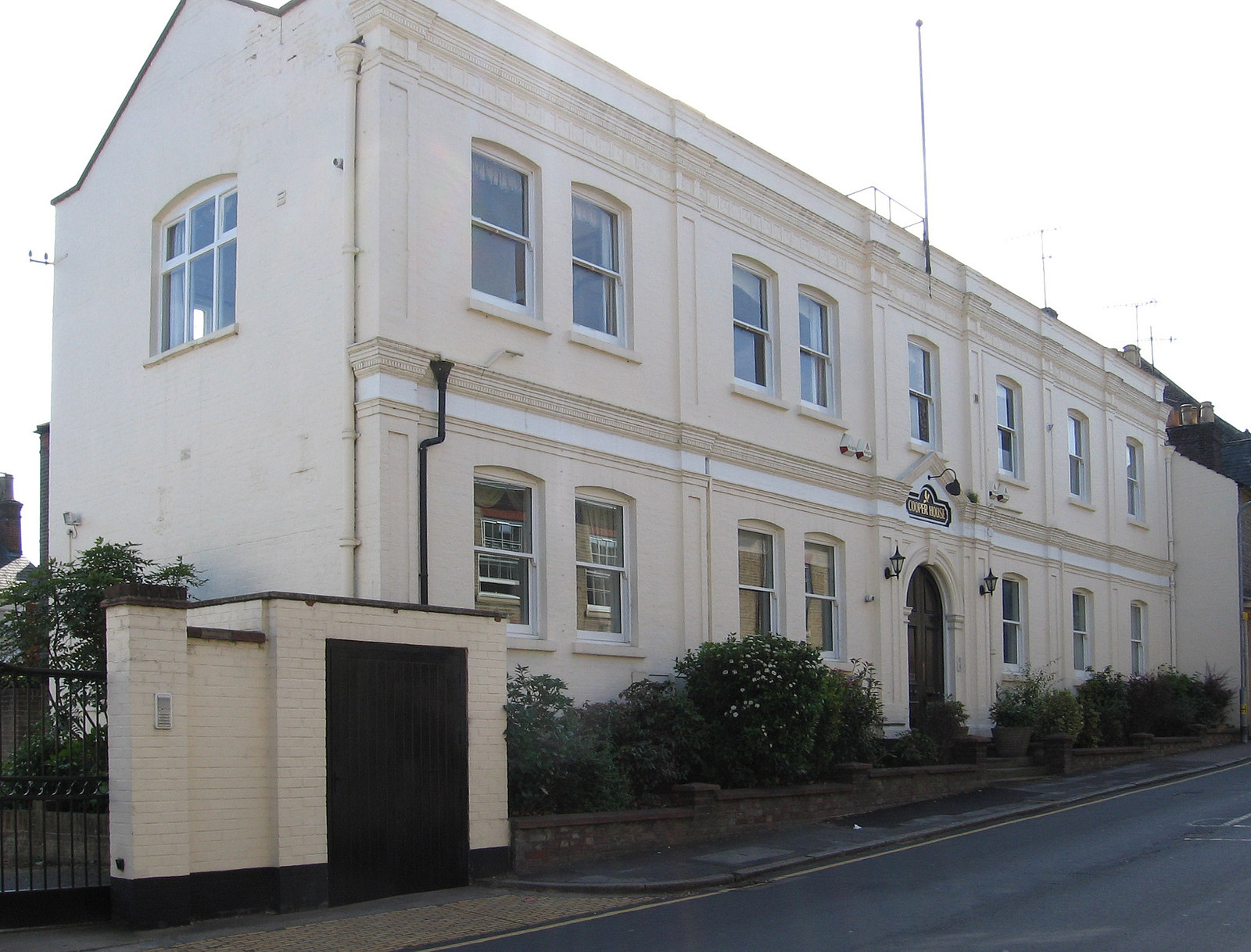
Part of the former Coopers works on Ravens Lane, Berkhamsted

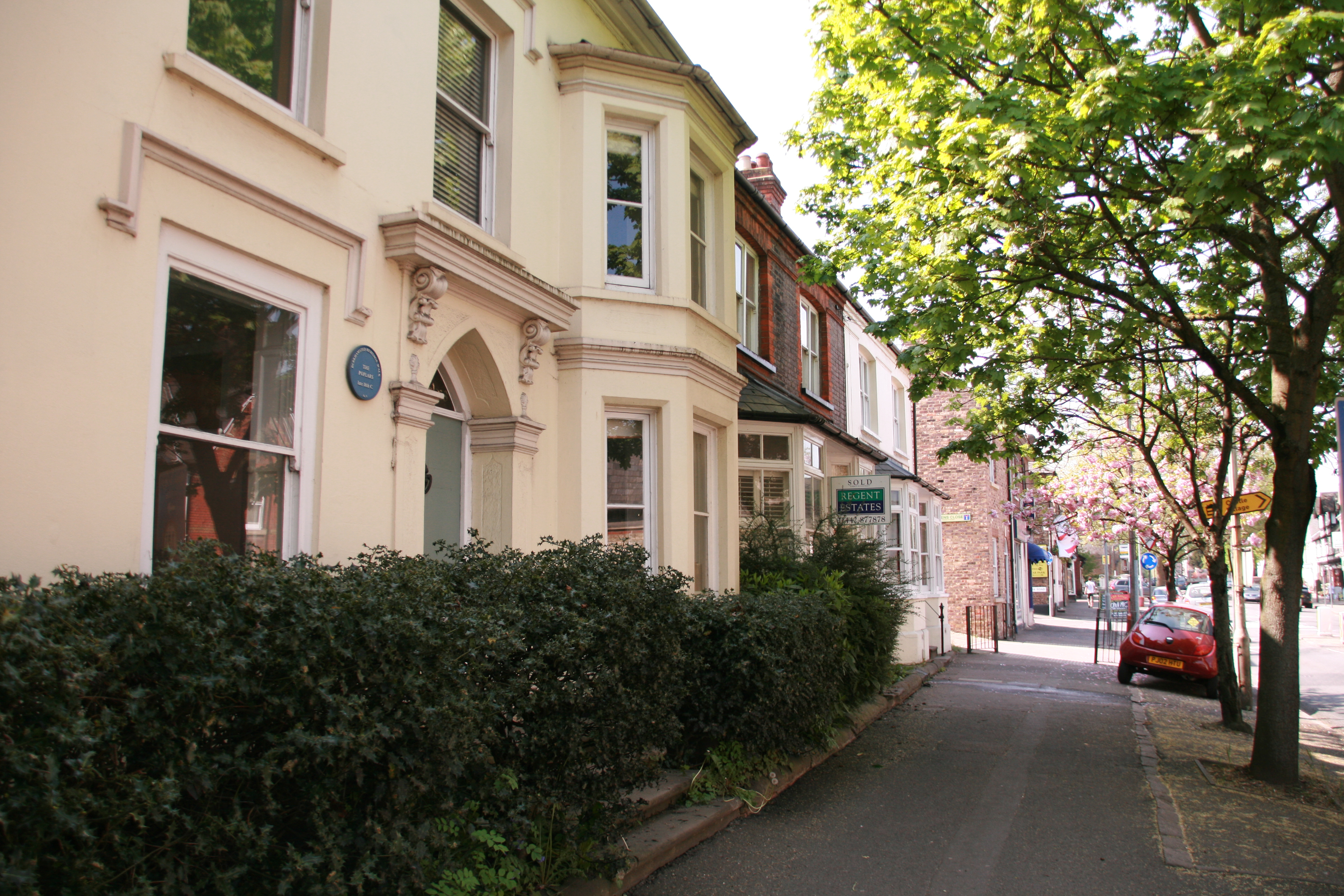
Cooper's house, The Poplars in Berkhamsted

Cooper set up his own manufacturing firm in Berkhamsted, and the chemical works became a major employer in the town. From 1852 throughout the remainder of the 19th century the Berkhamstead based business expanded at considerable speed, the newly built factory taking every advantage of the new mechanical innovations of the day. In the 1860s the horse powered mills were replaced with steam powered machinery. The factory had its own printing press producing labels of a complicated design in order to prevent the sheep dip being faked by the unscrupulous.

William Cooper formed a business partnership with his two nephews, Henry Herbert Cooper and Richard Powell Cooper, and the firm took on the name Cooper & Nephews. In 1885 William Cooper died aged 71, leaving the business to his nephews; Henry died in 1891, and his brother Richard Cooper became the sole proprietor of the business.

From 1885 to 1889, Richard began a large-scale expansion of the company. A shrewd business man, he made investments in land world wide and by 1913 owned 250,000 acres (1,000 km^{2}) around the globe and owned mines in New Zealand, Rhodesia, and South Africa. For services to Agriculture, Richard was created a baronet by King Edward VII in 1905, becoming the first baronet in the newly created Cooper Baronetcy of Shenstone Court.

The business, later known as Cooper, McDougall & Robertson, continued to trade for many years until it was bought in 1973 by the pharmaceuticals company Wellcome. The Berkhamsted chemical works eventually closed down and most of the buildings have since been demolished. Today, a veterinary company continues to operate in Australia under the Coopers Animal Health brand.

The Cooper family grave is located in the Cemetery of St Peter's Church on Rectory Lane, Berkhamsted. A stained glass window designed by the glazier Nathaniel Westlake was installed in the north aisle of St Peter's Church in 1885 in memory of William Cooper.
