= Sir Edward Cooper, 1st Baronet =

Lord Mayor of London from 1919 to 1920

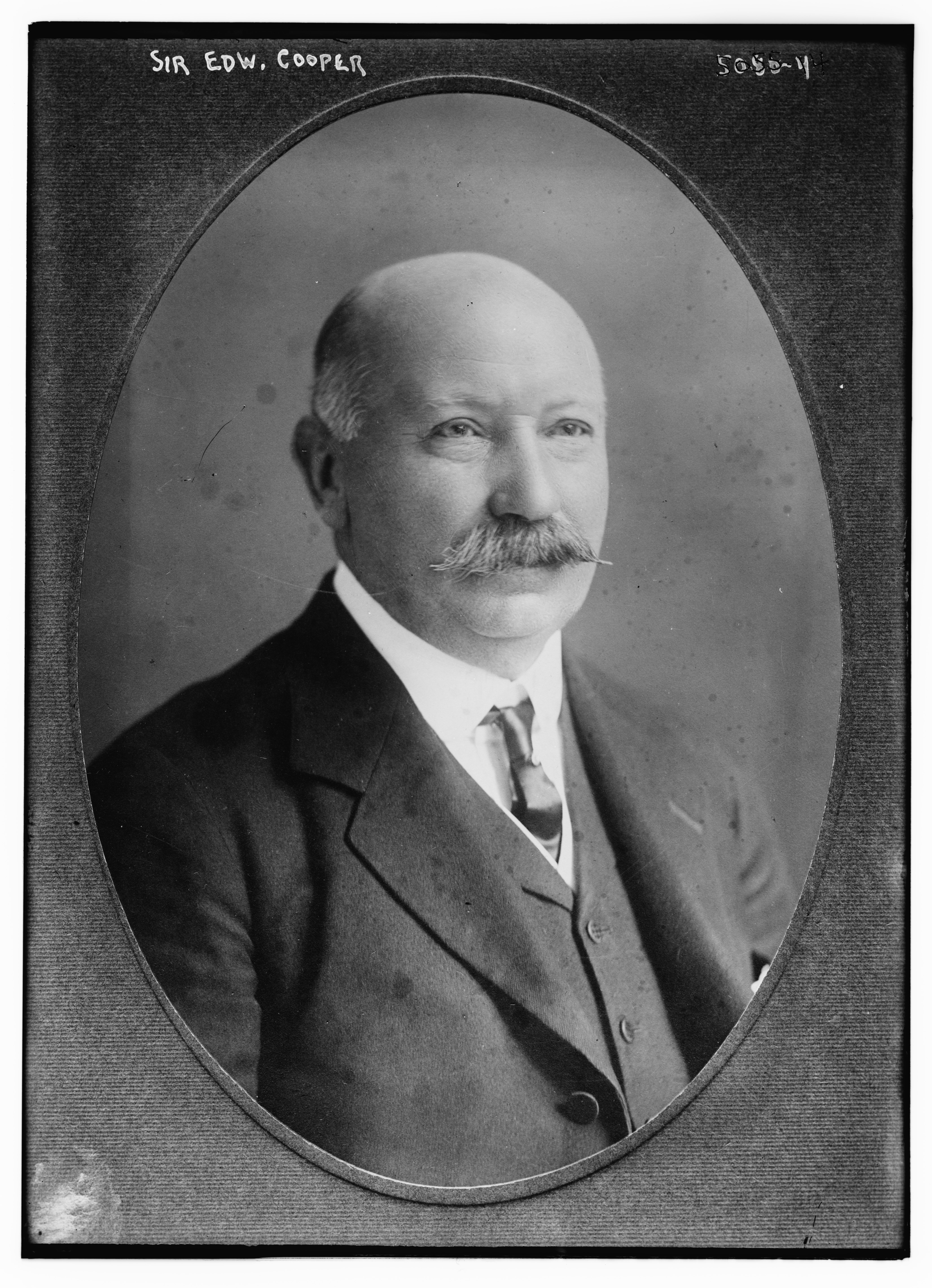
Sir Edward Cooper

Sir Edward Ernest Cooper, 1st Baronet (1848 – 12 February 1922) was Lord Mayor of London for 1919 to 1920.

== See also ==
- Cooper baronets

Baronetage of the United Kingdom
New creation	Baronet (of Berrydown Court); 1920–1922	Extinct
