= Cooper baronets of Shenstone Court (1905) =

Baronetcy in the Baronetage of the United Kingdom

Escutcheon of the Cooper baronets of Shenstone Court

Sir Richard Powell Cooper, 1st Baronet. (1847–1913) "Creator of Frinton-on-Sea, Captain of Industry and Farmer to the World"

The Cooper baronetcy, of Shenstone Court in the parish of Shenstone in the County of Stafford, was created in the Baronetage of the United Kingdom on 20 December 1905 for the agriculturalist Richard Powell Cooper.

The family business, in which the first four baronets were heavily involved, was notable for the invention of insecticides related to veterinary products, today known as Sheep dip. To date there have been six baronets. Sir William Cooper, 3rd baronet, once said "Our family solved Australia's economy overnight"

In terms of the British Baronetcy the Coopers are not an old family, their rise to prosperity during the Victorian era is a prime example of the achievement and social mobility possible in that age of scientific and industrial progress. When for the first time social advancement was occurring on a large scale.

== The Cooper family ==
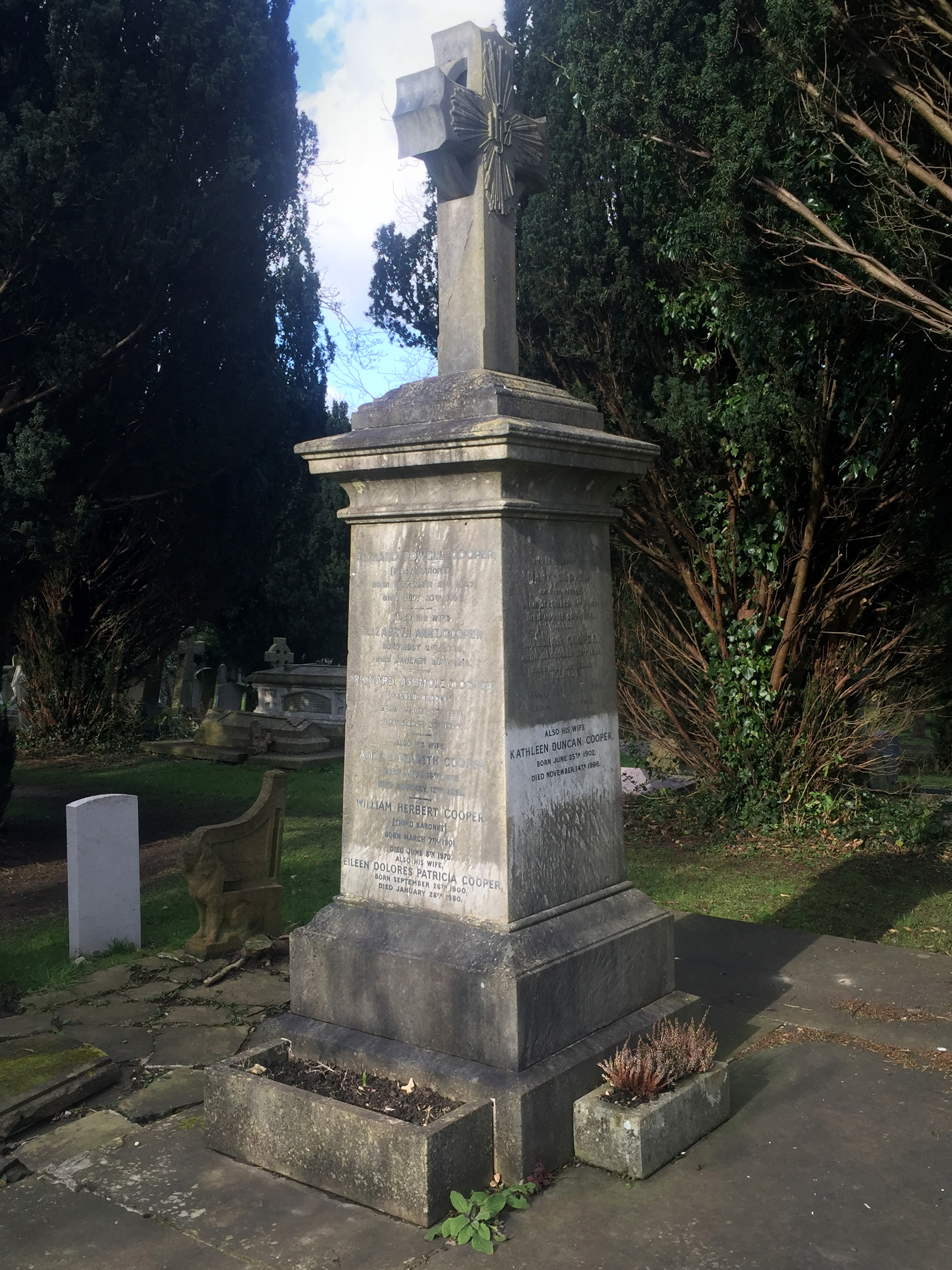
Monument to the Cooper Family in Rectory Lane Cemetery, Berkhamsted, Hertfordshire

The family business originally known as "Coopers" was founded by William Cooper, a veterinary surgeon, circa 1843 in Berkhamsted, Hertfordshire. Legend has it that he arrived in town with nothing but a bag with containing the tools of his trade. In the 1851 census he is recorded as a resident of the High Street in Berkhamsted.

As a veterinary surgeon he was frequently confronted by the horrendous condition of farm animals caused by various parasitic insects, in particular a skin disease which afflicted sheep known as "sheep scab" - at the time treated very ineffectually by only ointments composed of tobacco stalk and brimstone emulsified in animal fats. Cooper began to conduct his own experiments with preparations of arsenic and sulphur. By 1852 his experiments were conclusive enough for him to market the first truly effective sheep dip known as "Cooper's dip" it was sold in a powdered form which was easily transportable.

From 1852 throughout the remainder of the 19th century the Berkhamsted-based business expanded at considerable speed, the newly built factory taking every advantage of the new mechanical innovations of the day. In the 1860s the horses powered mills were replaced with steam powered machinery. The factory had its own printing press producing labels of a complicated design in order to prevent the sheep dip being faked by the unscrupulous.

Cooper died in 1885 - he had been joined in the business by two nephews Henry Herbert Cooper who died in 1891 and Richard Powell Cooper. Richard Cooper on the death of his brother Henry became the sole proprietor of the business by now known as "Cooper & Nephews". It is from Richard Powell Cooper that the Cooper baronets are descended.

The Cooper family grave is located in the Cemetery of St Peter's Church on Rectory Lane, Berkhamsted.

== Cooper baronets of Shenstone Court (1905) ==
- Sir Richard Powell Cooper, 1st Baronet (1847–1913)
- Sir Richard Ashmole Cooper, 2nd Baronet (1874–1946)
- Sir William Herbert Cooper, 3rd Baronet (1901–1970)
- Sir Francis Ashmole Cooper, 4th Baronet (1905–1987)
- Sir Richard Powell Cooper, 5th Baronet (1934–2006)
- Sir Richard Adrian Cooper, 6th Baronet (born 1960)

There is no heir to the title.

=== 1st Baronet ===
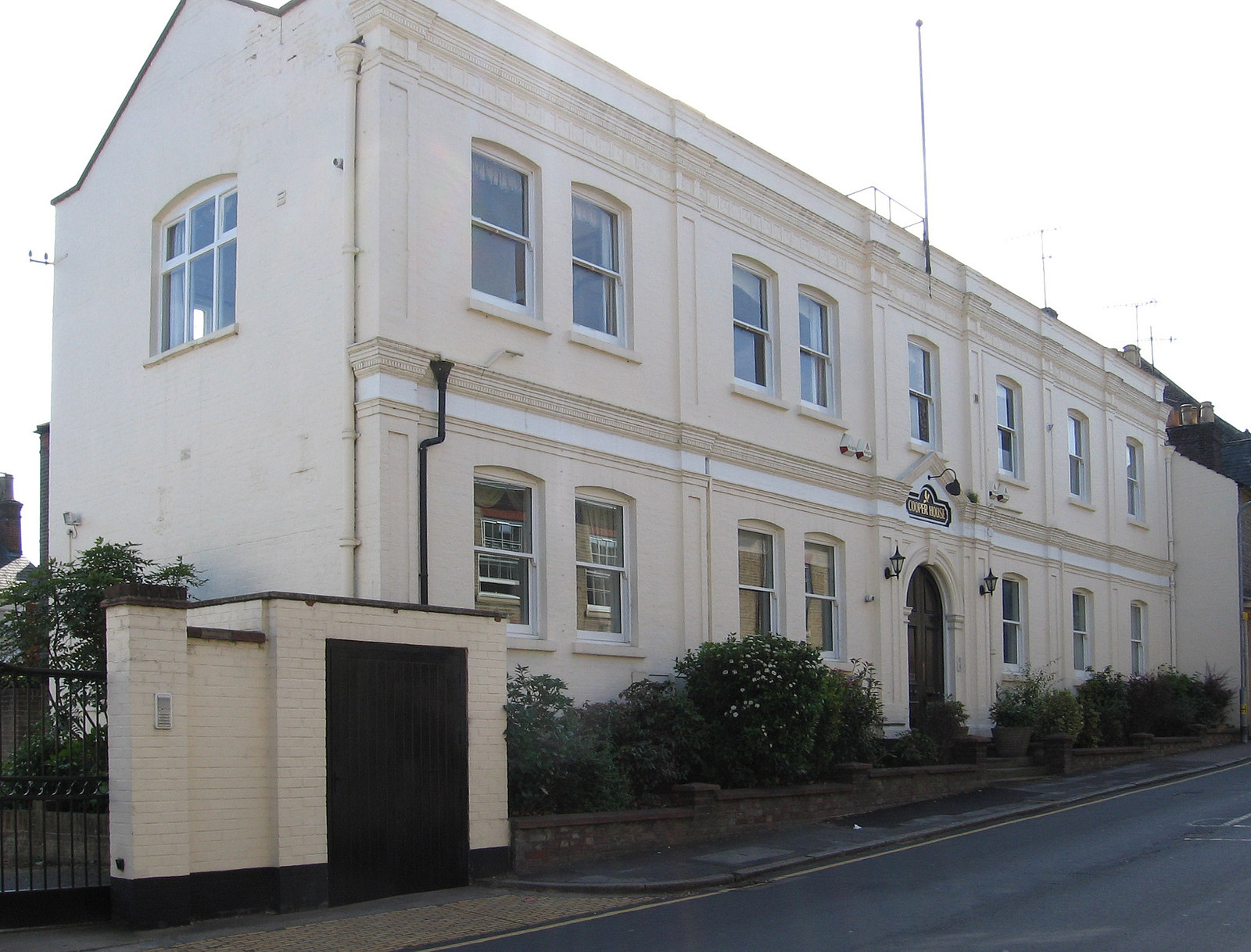
Former buildings of Cooper & Nephews on Ravens Lane, Berkhamsted

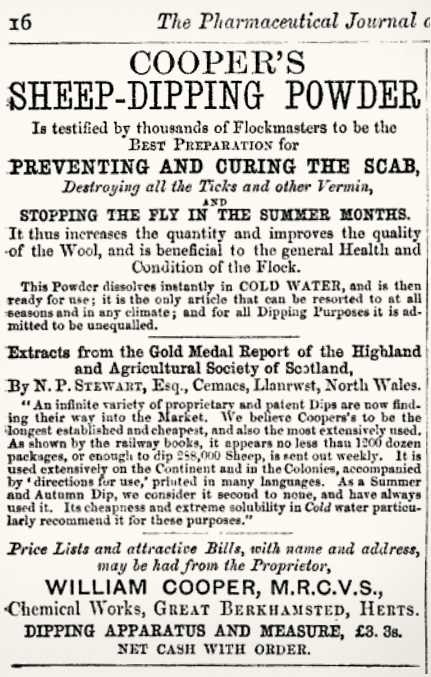
Newspaper advertisement for Cooper's Sheep Dip (Pharmaceutical Journal and Transactions, 1871)

Sir Richard Powell Cooper Bt. 1847–1913 has been described as "Creator of Frinton-on-Sea, Captain of Industry and Farmer to the World"

Cooper was born on 21 September 1847, the son of Henry Cooper of Clunbury, Aston-on-Clun, Shropshire. Privately educated, he completed his secondary education at the Royal College of Veterinary Surgeons, qualifying as veterinary surgeon in 1868. Two years later in 1870 he founded his own practice in Tamworth Street, Lichfield, Staffordshire

Aged 43 Cooper inherited the family business from his uncle, and from 1885 to 1889 undertook a large scale expansion of the company. A shrewd business man, he made investments in land worldwide and by 1913 owned 250,000 acres (1,000 km^{2}) around the globe, and with mines in New Zealand, Rhodesia, and South Africa.

Cooper purchased Shenstone Court in 1889 (it was subsequently rebuilt) and gave up his career as a veterinary surgeon from that date. He was created a baronet by King Edward VII in 1905 for services to Agriculture.

=== 2nd Baronet ===
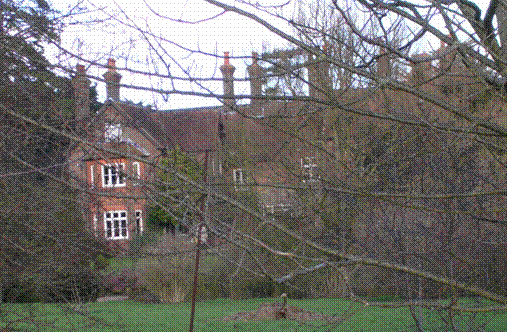
The Manor House, Billington. Richard Ashmole Cooper's Bedfordshire home

Sir Richard Ashmole Cooper 2nd baronet (11 August 1874 – 5 March 1946) was chairman of the family firm "Cooper McDougall & Robertson" from 1913 to 1946. He was a Unionist MP, representing the constituency of Walsall from 1910 until 1922. In 1917 together with Lord Ampthill and Sir Henry Page Croft he founded the very right wing National Party.

In 1925 Cooper decided to merge the business with that of Isaac McDougall, Chairman of McDougall and Robertson Ltd. The new company Cooper, Mcdougall and Robertson became a household name in Britain due to its merchandise which included many everyday products from domestic aerosol insecticides to nonprescription medications for both animals and humans.

In 1940 the company joined the war effort and developed the Anti-Louse Powder known as AL63. This was an important if largely unlauded medical breakthrough, during World War I lice had contributed heavily to the death count. The powder - a dust - not only killed lice but also acted as a preventative. The active ingredient DDT coupled with the new synthetic insecticide were gradually to replace the original Cooper's sheep dip which by now was used around the globe and assisted in the improvement to the economy of sheep farming from Australia to Argentina. The last powdered Cooper's sheep dip was produced in the mid-1950s. In 1959 Wellcome Research Laboratories bought the Coopers company.

Sir Richard Ashmole Cooper had married Alice Elizabeth Priestland in 1900 and the couple had purchased the Billington Manor estate in Bedfordshire. A keen horsemen at Billington Cooper had laid out a point-to-point course, and the Billington Races became a nationally known racing fixture. Cooper's eldest son William, regularly raced there against well known and aristocratic names of the day such The Prince of Wales and Lord Rosebery. The race course was ploughed up on the outbreak of war and never re-established.

- Alice died on 12 January 1963.
- Dick served in the Staffordshire Imperial Yeomanry.
- He was educated at Clifton College.

=== 3rd Baronet ===
Sir William Herbert Cooper, 3rd Baronet (1901–1970) MFH Old Berkeley

Married to Eileen Dolores Patricia (1900–1980).

=== 4th Baronet ===
Doctor Sir Francis Ashmole Cooper, 4th Baronet (1905–1987). He married Dorothy Frances Hendrika Deen, whose brother founded the Blue Star Garage chain.

=== 5th Baronet ===
Sir Richard Powell Cooper, 5th Baronet (13 April 1934 – 5 March 2006) was educated at Marlborough College and was killed in a car accident on 5 March 2006.

Sir Richard Cooper married Angela Wilson in 1957 (she died 18 July 2004). A keen agriculturist Cooper began his farming career running a family farm at Northchurch in Hertfordshire, before purchasing the Rowler Manor Estate in Northamptonshire. Later after his succession to the baronetcy he and his wife moved to Beaminster in Dorset. Cooper - a member of the Carlton Club - was Chairman of the Rare Breeds Survival Trust and an agricultural advisor to the Governments of Kazakhstan and Albania.

Cooper and his wife, who predeceased him, had three children - Jane, Belinda and Richard. The latter, who was always known as Adrian, succeeded him to the baronetcy.

=== 6th Baronet ===
Sir Richard Cooper (born 1960) was educated at Millfield.

== Notes ==
Baronetage of the United Kingdom
Preceded by Cohen baronets	Cooper baronets of Shenstone Court; 20 December 1905	Succeeded by Hare baronets
