= Church of St Peter, Great Berkhamsted =

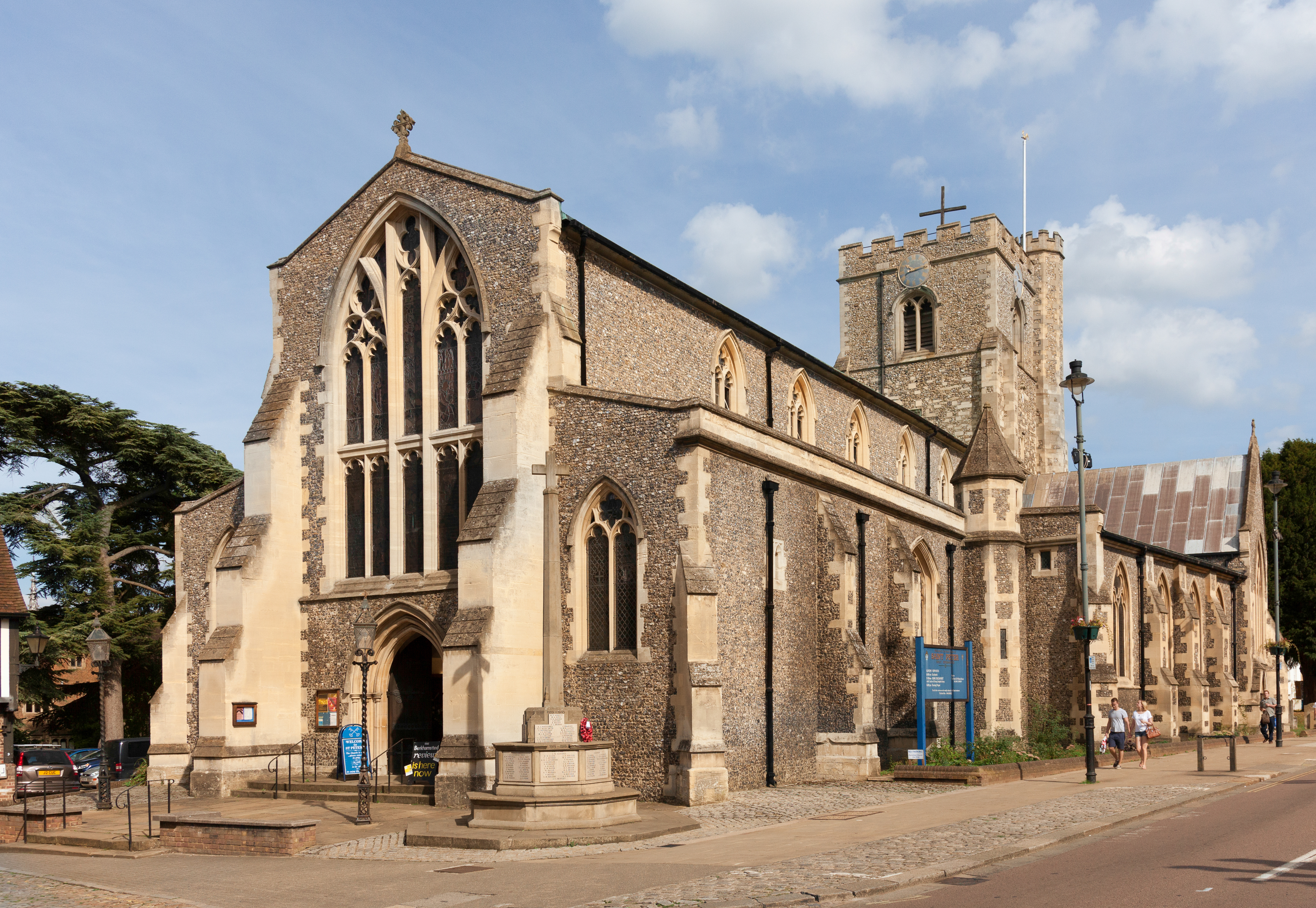
- Church of St Peter, Great Berkhamsted
- 51.759673°N 0.561751°W
- OS grid reference: SP 99359 07754
- Location: St Peter's Church, Church Lane, Berkhamsted, Hertfordshire, HP4 2AX
- Country: England
- Denomination: Anglican
- Website: stpetersberkhamsted.org.uk

History
- Founded: c.1222
- Founder: Abbot of Grestein
- Dedication: St Peter
- Events: 1222: church founded 1230: nave extended 1320: St Catherine's Chapel built 1381: Richard II is royal patron 1350: St John's Chantry built 1546: tower raised 1820: Wyattville's restoration 1871: Butterfield's restoration; Earl Brownlow becomes patron 1960: Church re-ordered 1986: Present organ installed

Architecture
- Heritage designation: Listed II*
- Style: Early English, Decorated; much Victorian restoration work
- Years built: c.1200

Specifications
- Length: 168 feet (51 m)
- Width: 90 feet (27 m)
- Height: 85 feet (26 m)

Administration
- Province: Canterbury
- Diocese: St Albans
- Archdeaconry: St Albans
- Deanery: Berkhamsted
- Parish: Great Berkhamsted

Clergy
- Vicar: The Revd Stuart Owen

The Parish Church of St Peter, Great Berkhamsted, is a Church of England, Grade II* listed church in the town of Berkhamsted, Hertfordshire, in the United Kingdom. It stands on the main High Street of the town and is recognisable by its 85-foot (26 m) clock tower.

The building is medieval in origin, the earliest part dating from c.1200, and the architecture spans at least five architectural periods, mostly 14th and 15th centuries. The church was altered greatly during the Victorian era, most notably undergoing a restoration by William Butterfield. It is one of the largest churches in Hertfordshire.

Because of its proximity to Berkhamsted Castle, St Peter's has had a long association with Royalty, with the reigning monarch acting as patron to Berkhamsted rectors for several centuries. Many members of the congregation also worked in important positions for the Royal household. The church has counted among its worshippers such notable figures as the poet William Cowper and John Incent, who went on to become Dean of St Paul's Cathedral 1540–1545.

The church today has lost its direct royal ties and now functions as the main parish church of the town of Berkhamsted. The feast of St Peter is celebrated annually with the Petertide fair.

== History ==
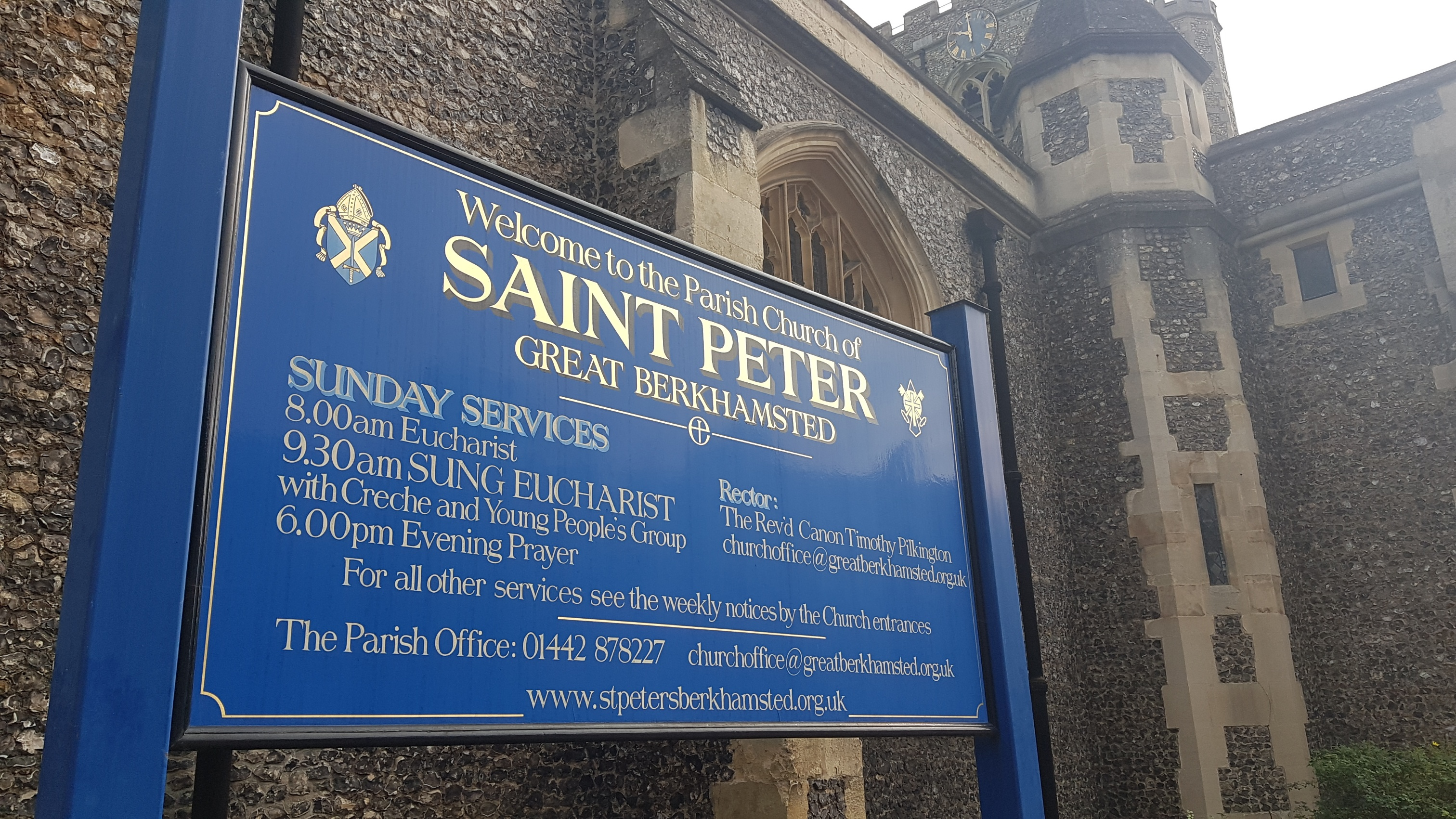
The sign at the front of the church

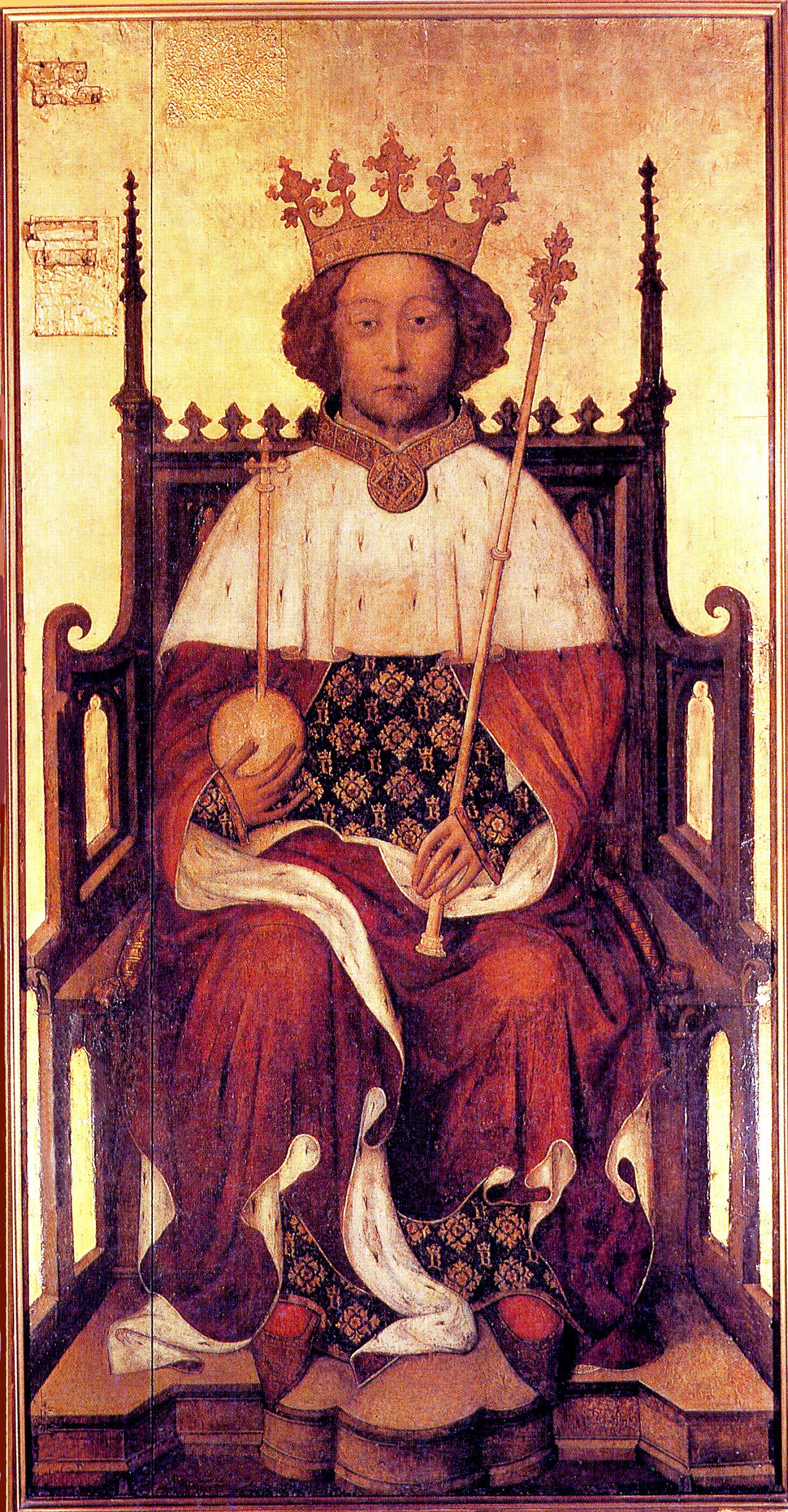
Richard II, the first Royal patron of Berkhamsted St Peter, from the portrait in Westminster Abbey

It is not known exactly when the first church was built on the site of St Peter's, but it is not the oldest church in the area; the church of St Mary in Northchurch, about 1.4 miles (2.3 km) north-west of St Peter's, is estimated to be Saxon in origin and was mentioned in the Domesday Book (1086). The advowson of a church of Berkhamsted – probably that of St Mary's – along with the advowson of the chapel of the castle, was granted to the monastery of Grestein Abbey in Normandy sometime between 1087 and 1104 by William, Count of Mortain. It was about this time that the Parish of Great Berkhampstead was created. St Mary's church was originally known as Berkhampstead St Mary and it is thought that it was the original main church in the area until it was superseded by the larger St Peter's after the Norman Conquest, when the focus of political and ecclesiastical power moved south to the area around Berkhamsted Castle. By the 14th century, the town had acquired the name of le Northcherche or Northchurch to distinguish it from St Peter's.

=== Foundation ===
The date of foundation of a church in Berkhamsted town is uncertain; a chapel certainly existed within the walls of Berkhamsted Castle from the 11th century, rebuilt around 1250 by Richard of Cornwall. The possibility exists of another town chapel dedicated to St James; this is supported by the fact that for many centuries, the Berkhamsted town fair was held on the feast day of St James rather than at Petertide, suggesting an ancient celebration of the patron saint. It is thought that this chapel of St James stood on the present site of the town Post Office.

The foundation date of St Peter's is also uncertain, but historians assume it to be around 1222, the year that Robert de Tuardo, the first known rector, was instituted by the Bishop of Lincoln, Hugh of Wells. The Parish of Berkhampstead St Peter was originally part of the huge Diocese of Lincoln (Archdeaconry of Huntingdon), until it was transferred in 1843 to Rochester (Archdeaconry of St Albans) and then again in 1877 to the newly formed Diocese of St Albans.

=== Medieval St Peter's ===
A brass plaque can be seen inside the church today which lists all the rectors from the 13th century to the present day. The turnover of rectors was especially high in the 14th century, probably due to their lives being cut short by the bubonic plague; between 1369 and 1386, St Peter's had eight successive rectors, the shortest being Thomas Payne, whose tenure lasted only nine days. John de Waltham was rector of St Peter's from 1379 along with a large number of other parishes, as was common at the time. He left after 16 months in office, and was later ordained Bishop of Salisbury in 1388. Waltham enjoyed an especially close relationship with King Richard II such that, after his death, Richard honoured him with a tomb in Westminster Abbey in the Chapel of Edward the Confessor, the only person not of royal blood to be buried in the royal chapel.

=== 16th and early 17th centuries ===
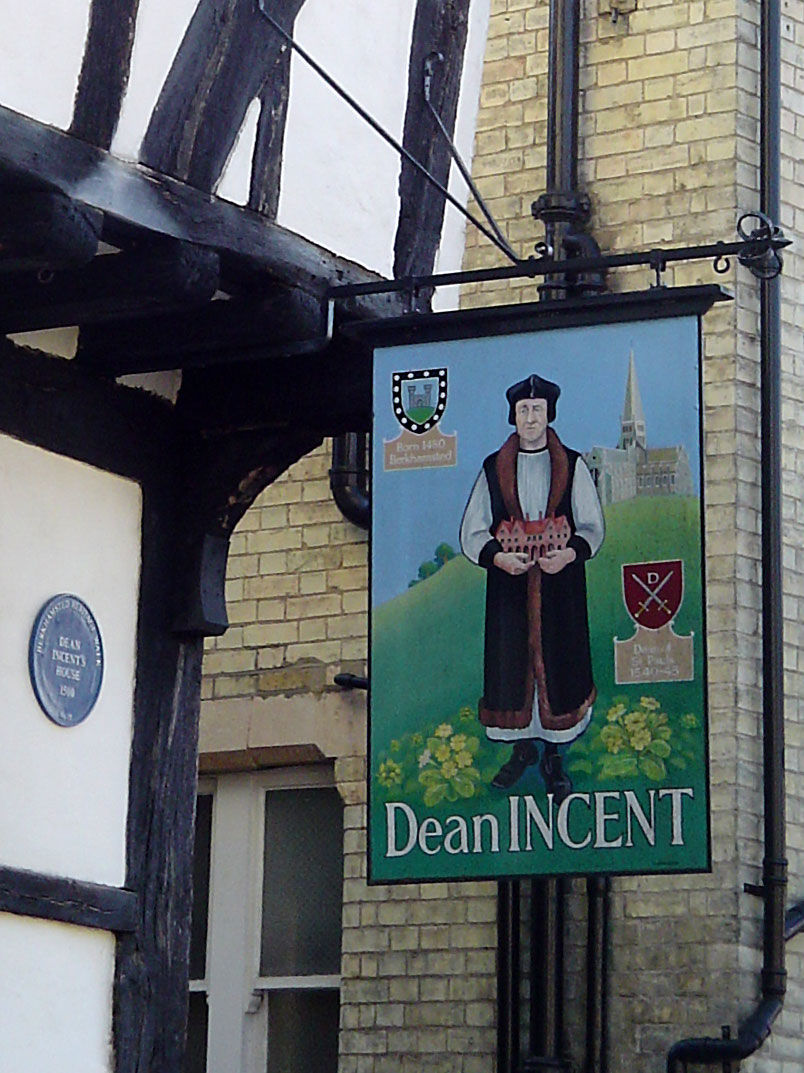
Dean Incent's House, depicting John Incent on the sign

Brass memorials in the church commemorate Katherine and Robert Incent, two 16th-century parishioners. Robert was the secretary to Cicely, Duchess of York at Berkhamsted Castle. Their son, John Incent, was Dean of St Paul's Cathedral 1540–1545, and in 1541 he founded the Berkhamsted School. The Incent family house, which still stands on the High Street opposite the church, is today known as "Dean Incent's House".

One rector noted for his long tenure was Rev. Thomas Newman, who was rector for over 40 years from 1598 to 1639. Newman served for a time as a Chief Burgess of Berkhamsted and mayor in 1631. According to parish records, Newman was the second husband of Bridget (Dryden) Marbury, who was mother of Anne Marbury Hutchinson by way of her first husband Francis Marbury. Despite being a staunch Anglican, by 1645 Newman fell into political disfavor by being barred from the rectory of St. Peter's by Act of Parliament for a payment delinquency.

=== The Civil War ===
Newman's successor, Rev John Napier, was instituted as rector of St Peter's in 1639 but ejected by Parliament during the English Civil War and was replaced by a series of "intruder" priests installed by Parliament: George Phippon, William Harrison, David Bramley (or Bramble) and Richard Lee. After 18 years living in Buckinghamshire, Napier had his own restoration as rector of Great Berkhamsted in 1670 and remained in office until 1681. During his absence, Napier continued to record the baptisms of his own children in the Berkhamsted parish register, signing himself as rector. Although no battles were fought in the area during the Civil War, Berkhamsted lay on the lines of communication between London and Aylesbury and Royalist forces sometimes passed through the parish and soldiers were billeted in local cottages. St Peter's Church was itself caught up in the conflict when, in 1648, it was requisitioned by General Fairfax as a Military prison to hold captured soldiers from the Siege of Colchester. Because the church was full of maimed, hungry soldiers, Fairfax ordered that the church windows be taken out. When the church was eventually returned to parish control, the vestry levied a special tax of twopence an acre on local landowners to pay for replacement windows.

Another long-standing rector was Napier's successor, Rev Robert Brabant, whose ministry also lasted over 40 years (1681 to 1722). He was also the vicar of Hemel Hempstead and chaplain to Queen Anne.

After the Restoration of the English monarchy in 1660, John Sayer, a member St Peter's congregation was appointed chief cook to King Charles II. Sayer was a wealthy man and lived in Berkhamsted Place and benefactor of the town. He was known to Samuel Pepys, who wrote of him in his Diary. In 1661, Pepys wrote "...I went with Captain Morrice at his desire into the King's Privy Kitchen to Mr. Sayres, the Master Cook, and there we had a good slice of beef or two to our breakfast, and from thence he took us into the wine cellar where, by my troth, we were very merry, and I drank too much wine, and all along had great and particular kindness from Mr. Sayres, but I drank so much wine that I was not fit for business." Upon his death in 1682, John Sayer left £1000 in his will for the construction of a row of almshouses on Berkhamsted High Street, containing twelve rooms for the habitation of six poor widows. The endowment also provided for a weekly allowance of two shillings and a fuel allowance for each widow. The almshouses, which are still in existence today, were completed in 1684 and bear an inscription on the front, "A gift of John Sayer, 1684". Sayer's elaborate marble tomb stands in the Lady chapel of St Peter's.

=== William Cowper ===
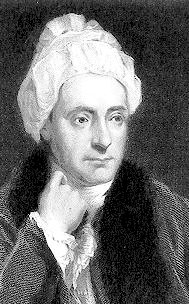
The poet William Cowper, son of the Berkhamsted Rector John Cowper (1722–1756)

From 1722 to 1756, Rev John Cowper served as rector of St Peter's; he is noted because he was the father of the poet and hymnodist William Cowper, who was born in Berkhamsted in 1731 and baptised in the church. William Cowper went on to write a number of hymns which became popular in the Evangelical movement and were included in Anglican hymn books such as the English Hymnal.

=== 19th century ===
Charles de Guiffadière, who was rector from 1798 to 1810 and also served as vicar of Stoke Newington, was a reader to Queen Caroline and a popular figure of fun who featured in the humorous journal The Diary of Fanny Burney as the character "Mr Turbulent".

In the 19th century, the Rev John Wolstenholme Cobb documented much of Berkhamsted's past when he wrote his History and Antiquities of Berkhamsted during his time as curate of St Peter's (1853–55). He then went on to become rector of the parish from 1871 to 1883.

St Peter's has also counted among its congregation members of the Dorrien-Smith family who are commemorated by various memorials around the church. Augustus John Smith became the first Lord Proprietor of the Scilly Islands in 1834, and was succeeded by Dorrien-Smiths; George Dorrien was Governor of the Bank of England 1818–1820; and several members of the Dorrien-Smith family saw active service in the Second Boer War of 1899–1902.

=== Royal patronage ===
From the installation of Robert de Tuardo, the rectors of the Church of St Peter, Great Berkhamsted were presented by the abbot of Grestein until 1381, when Peter de Burton was presented by King Richard II. This tradition of the reigning monarch acting as patron to each new rector continued more or less unbroken until the 18th century. The last reigning monarch to act in this role for Great Berkhamsted was Charles II in 1681, for the installation of Robert Brabant. At the installation of the next rector in 1722, John Cowper, the duty of patronage was taken on by George, Prince of Wales. From this time, rectors were presented by princes of Wales until Rev James Hutchinson (installed in 1851 with Prince Albert Edward as patron). After the local Duchy of Cornwall estates were sold to the Ashridge Estate in 1862, rectors of Great Berkhamsted were presented by Earls of Brownlow; Hutchinson's successor, Rev John Wolstenholme Cobb, was presented by Earl Brownlow in 1871.

== Architecture ==
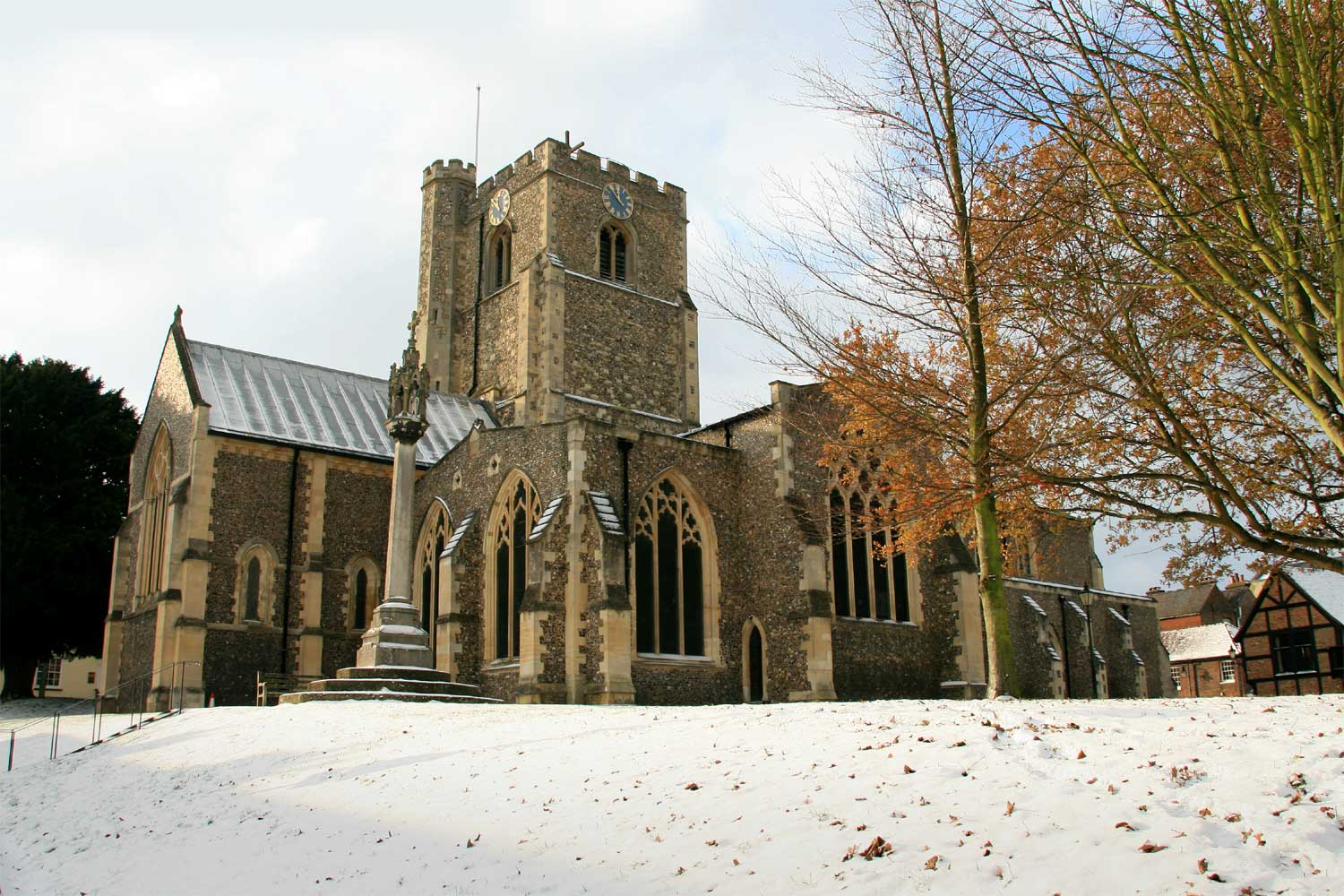
St Peter's in the snow, seen from the north-east, showing (left to right) the chancel, the Lady Chapel, the adjoining north transept and the roof of the north aisle

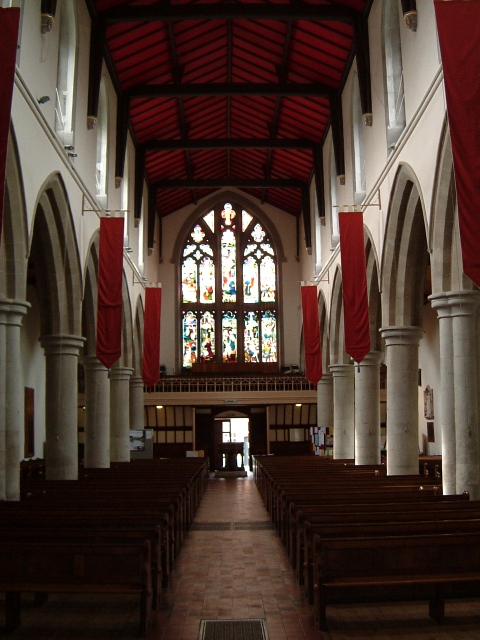
The 13th-century nave looking towards the west window

The church is in a cruciform layout, and measures 168 feet (51 m) from the west door to the east window and the width across the transepts is 90 feet (27 m). The oldest part of the church is the chancel which is dated at c.1200, the foundation of the church, and it is in the Early English style common in that period. The transepts, erected during the reign of Edward II are from the Decorated Period.

=== Additions and alterations ===
The architecture of St Peter's belongs to no single period, but extends over about 350 years. Many additions have made to the church over the centuries and subsequent Victorian restorations have changed the fabric of the church substantially.

==== Expansion 1230–1546 ====
In the 13th century, construction progressed rapidly westwards, with the nave, transepts and crossing being added in the first few years after the construction of the chancel. In 1230, north and south aisles were added to the nave and the north transept was extended on the eastern side; this extension was later used partly as a vestry, and today serves as the Lady Chapel. On the south side of the Chancel, the chapel of St Catherine was added in 1320, and in 1350 the irregularly angled St John's Chantry was built onto the south aisle for worship by the boys and masters of Berkhamsted School. In 1450 a clerestory was added to the nave, raising its height, and a large timber pillar added to the middle of the St John Chantry. Expansion of the church culminated in 1545-6 when the tower was raised to its current height of 85 feet (26 m), and the church reached its present size.

==== Decay ====
Over the years the fabric of the building decayed. On one occasion in the 1700s, the boys and masters had a narrow escape when, moments after they had left the chantry to go into the main body of the church, the main beam gave way and the ceiling collapsed. The event was recorded by one Nathaniel Salmon, who also reported that the disaster had uncovered a set of painted figures on the pillars, possibly medieval in origin, of the Eleven Apostles and Saint George and the Dragon. Salmon noted that they had "but lately come to light, having, by the zeal of the last generation, been whited over", in reference to the efforts of Puritan iconoclasts of the English Civil War during the previous century.

==== Wyattville's restoration ====
The structure of the church continued to evolve; doors were added and blocked up, fittings were installed and moved around and monuments resited and removed. In the 19th century there were major restorations of St Peter's church; the first in 1820, led by Jeffry Wyattville, architect of Ashridge House, was controversial and has been criticised for the destruction of many original features of the building. During the works, churchwardens were involved in removing ancient monuments from the church, and Wyattville covered the outer walls with stucco. The font was moved from the west end to the south porch, and the door was walled up, the Torrington tomb was moved from the nave into the transept, and many old inscriptions were obliterated. The peal of six bells was recast into eight, and a gallery which stood between the tower arches was removed and a new gallery erected at the west end.

==== Butterfield's restoration ====
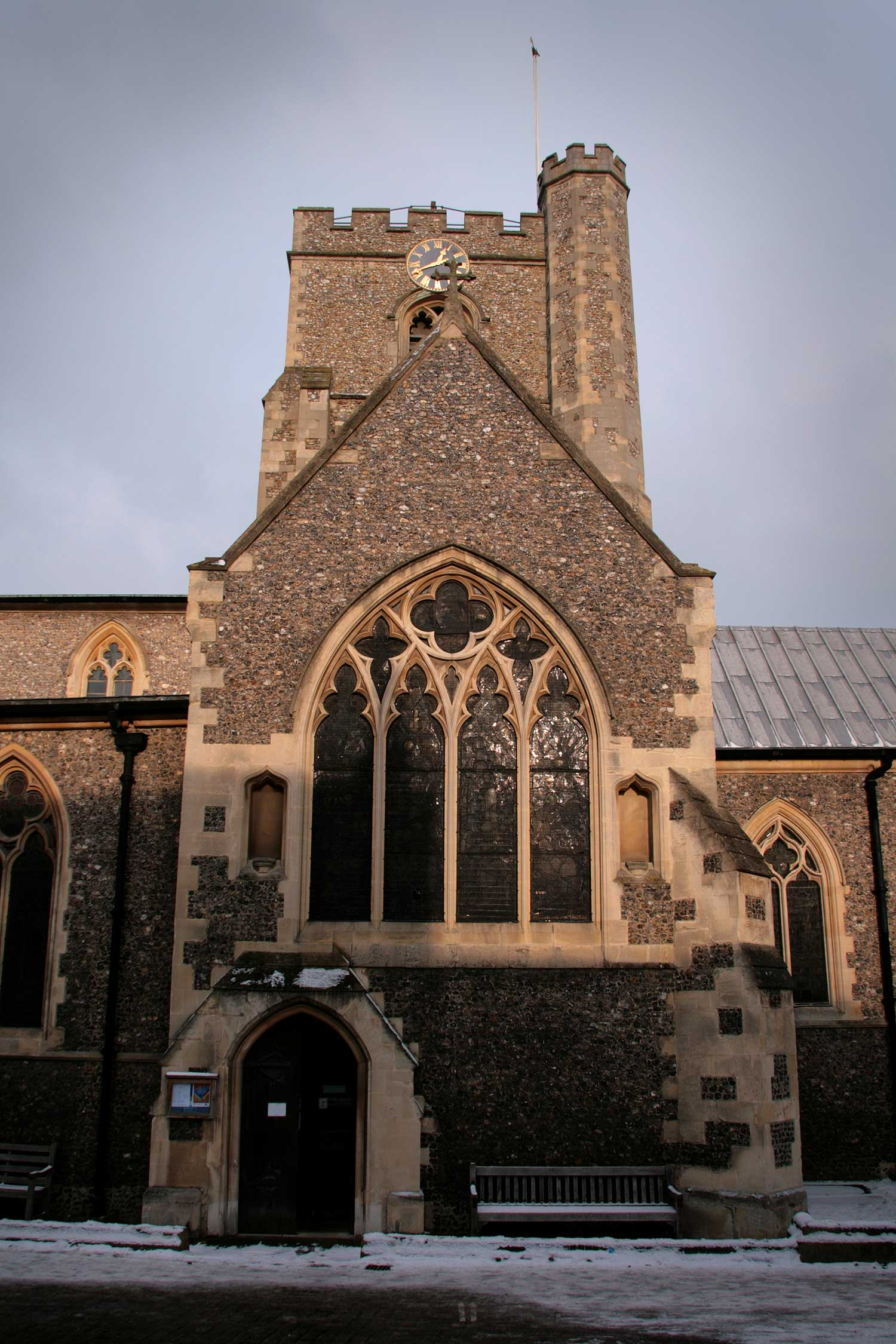
The south transept, raised to its original height and faced in flint by Butterfield

In 1870–71 another restoration programme was carried out by William Butterfield, a Gothic Revival architect whose works included churches such as All Saints, Margaret Street in London as well as an array of church restorations. Butterfield's restoration of St Peter's Church is more positively assessed, although his work also involved the removal of some original features, including the obliteration of the paintings on the pillars. The most substantial structural changes involved raising both the roof and the floor of the chancel, raising the roof of the south transept to its original pitch, removing the vestry, incorporating the south porch into the south aisle and removing the door, re-flooring the nave, installing new oak benches and replacing Wyattville's gallery. Butterfield also installed clear windows in the clerestory, allowing more light to enter the nave. He extended the aisles by knocking down the dividing walls of two chambers at the west end; one of these chambers, in the south-west corner of the nave, was used to house the town fire engine. A door to the right of the great west door had "Engine House" painted above it on the outside; Butterfield blocked up this door. The flint from these alterations was kept in storage and was later used in the construction of Sunnyside Parish Church in 1909. On the exterior of the church, Butterfield removed Wyattville's crumbling plaster and re-faced the church walls with flint flushwork.

==== 20th-century re-ordering ====
Between 1956 and 1960 St Peter's underwent further restoration in which the tower and nave were re-roofed. St Catherine's Chapel and the nave were refurbished and a large mural of the Ascension by Burrows which covered the wall over the tower arch was painted over. The church was also substantially re-ordered, and the high altar and sanctuary area brought forward under the tower crossing. The wooden 15th-century rood screen which separated the nave from the crossing was painted and gilded in a medieval style, and a set of twelve carved figures which had been added in the early 19th century were also painted and mounted higher up the screen. The screen was backed with oak and re-mounted on the back of the new sanctuary area to form a reredos behind the altar, also serving as a dividing wall with the old chancel area which was converted into a vestry area.

=== Nave ===
The late Gothic Revival pulpit dates from 1910 and is decorated with figures of angels, carved by Harry Hems.

In the north aisle stands the Parish Chest, a finely carved 17th century wooden chest which contained parish documents. By the corner of the north transept stands the marble tomb of Sir John Cornwallis, a member of the Council of King Edward VI.

=== Sanctuary ===
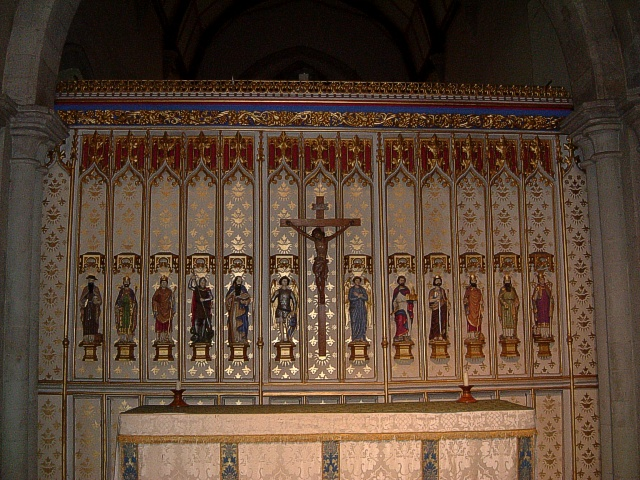
The gilded reredos

The high altar, located under the tower crossing since 1960, is on a raised white marble floor. The gilded reredos, a reworking of the 15th-century rood screen presents the figures of twelve saints. To the left of the sanctuary is the long brass plaque listing the rectors of Great Berkhamsted from 1222 to the present day. Brass memorials on the walls commemorate Rev JW Cobb and his wife.

=== St John's Chantry ===
This chantry chapel was used for worship by the boys and masters of Berkhamsted School until the 19th century, when the school built its own chapel, and was physically separated from the nave by a dividing wall.

The chantry is now used for the choir stalls and organ. The present organ was built by Peter Collins or Redbourne in 1986, and replaces an earlier instrument built by Walker. Some of the Walker pipework was incorporated into the modern instrument. The organ has two manuals, the brightly coloured casing is in English oak and decorations are in sycamore wood.

The chantry contains monumental brasses commemorating Robert and Katherine Incent, the parents of John Incent. Another brass commemorates John Raven, squire to the Edward, the Black Prince at Berkhamsted Castle.

=== Lady Chapel ===
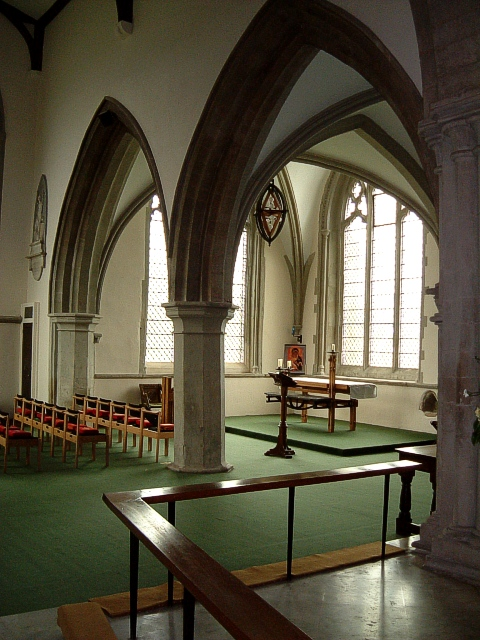
The Lady Chapel

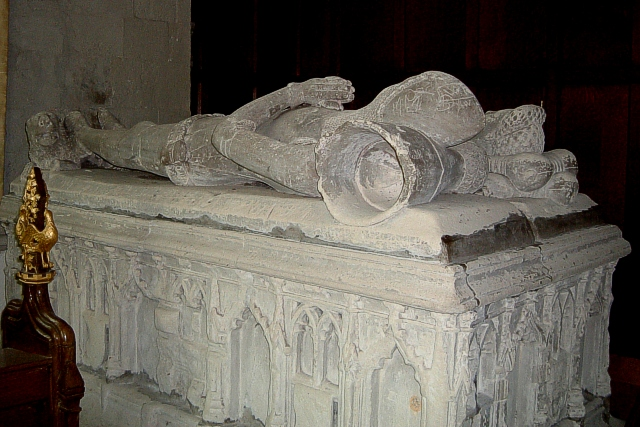
The 14th-century tomb of Henry of Berkhamsted

The Lady Chapel forms a bright, spacious part of the church dating from the 13th century. It is an extension of the north transept. The interior carving around the windows and arches features ball-flower motif of the Decorated Period. The present windows and the windows of the north transept are good examples of curvilinear tracery, typical of the first half of the 14th century, although the glass is from a later period. Traces of the original window arches are still visible.

The Lady Chapel also contains some notable memorials, including the marble tomb of John Sayer, inscribed with the date 1682. Next to the old chancel (now the wooden steps into the vestry) lies a stone tomb which is thought to be that of Henry of Berkhamsted and his wife; the tomb has lost its inscription and the identity of the persons interred within has been in dispute for many years. The tomb has two stone supine effigies on top with hands together in prayer, Henry wearing medieval armour. Henry was Constable to the Black Prince at Berkhamsted Castle in the mid-14th century.

=== St Catherine's Chapel ===
St Catherine's Chapel, dedicated to Catherine of Alexandria, lies to the south of the old chancel adjoining the south transept. Dating from around 1320, it contains two recessed medieval tombs in the south wall, one of which contains a tomb slab decorated with a carved floriated cross. The 16th-century wall monuments commemorate Waterhouse family. The chapel was restored around 1900 and the alabaster reredos – a copy of high altar screen in Winchester Cathedral – and the stained glass windows date from this period.

=== Chancel ===
The old chancel is used today as a vestry for the choir and clergy. The area still contains fixtures from its days as the sanctuary before the church was re-ordered in 1960, including a large mosaic reredos by Alfred Hoare Powell with a painted crucifixion scene by Burrows. There also several memorials to past worshippers, including one to Ann Cowper, wife of the Rector John Cowper and mother of William Cowper; valedictory lines by the poet in tribute to his mother are engraved on the memorial, ending "These lines, though weak, are as herself sincere".

=== Tower ===
The 85 feet (26 m) clock tower was finished in 1546 and contains a peal of eight bells with a combined weight of 3.5 long tons (3.6 t). The bells were re-cast in 1837 from the bells dating from 1553 with additional metal by Mears and Stainbrook of Whitechapel. At the same time, a new clock was installed.

=== Windows ===
The windows in St Peter's include some lancets surviving from the 14th century, along with much notable stained glass from renowned Victorian glass makers Heaton and Butler, Clayton and Bell, Charles Eamer Kempe, Nathaniel Westlake and James Powell and Sons.

- West window: Perpendicular style tracery, thought to date from the reign of James I, although the glass was replaced after General Faifrax's intrusion during the Civil War. The present stained glass dates from 1866, designed by Heaton and Butler, for which they were awarded a bronze medal at the Paris Exhibition of 1867.
- East Window: stained glass in memory of William Cowper, Clayton and Bell, 1872.
- Chancel Windows: date from c.1420, featuring coats of arms of the See of Canterbury impaling Chichele, royal arms of France quartered with England.
- St John's Chantry windows: arms of Richard Plantagenet, 3rd Duke of York, 15th century; other windows are 1865–69 by Heaton and Butler.
- St Catherine's Chapel: one of the windows is signed by TF Curtis of Curtis, Ward and Hughes; windows date from the 1900 restoration work on the chapel.
- North transept windows: Dorrien Memorial, Powell, 1852.
- South transept windows: Curtis Memorial (1872) and Mary window (1874), both Clayton and Bell.
- North aisle windows: the windows in the north aisle were 14th-century in origin, and the tracery typifies the transitional style between the Decorated and Perpendicular styles. They now contain Victorian stained glass, including the ubiquitous stained glass copy by Heaton & Butler of William Holman Hunt's painting The Light of the World which now hangs in St Paul's Cathedral, London.

A three-light window by Westlake, installed in 1885 in memory of the Berkhamsted sheep dip manufacturer William Cooper, depicts Christ enthroned surrounded by saints and martyrs, including Edward the Confessor and Hugh of Lincoln accompanied by his pet swan. A window by Alexander Gibbs was installed in 1872 at the west end of the aisle in memory of Rev F. Bullock who drowned in that year; this was replaced in 2000 with a window by David Peace and Sally Scott marking the Christian Millennium and the bicentenary of William Cowper's death. The clear glass is etched with quotes from Cowper's poetry, images of Berkhamsted and scenes of nature.

== Churchyard and cemetery ==
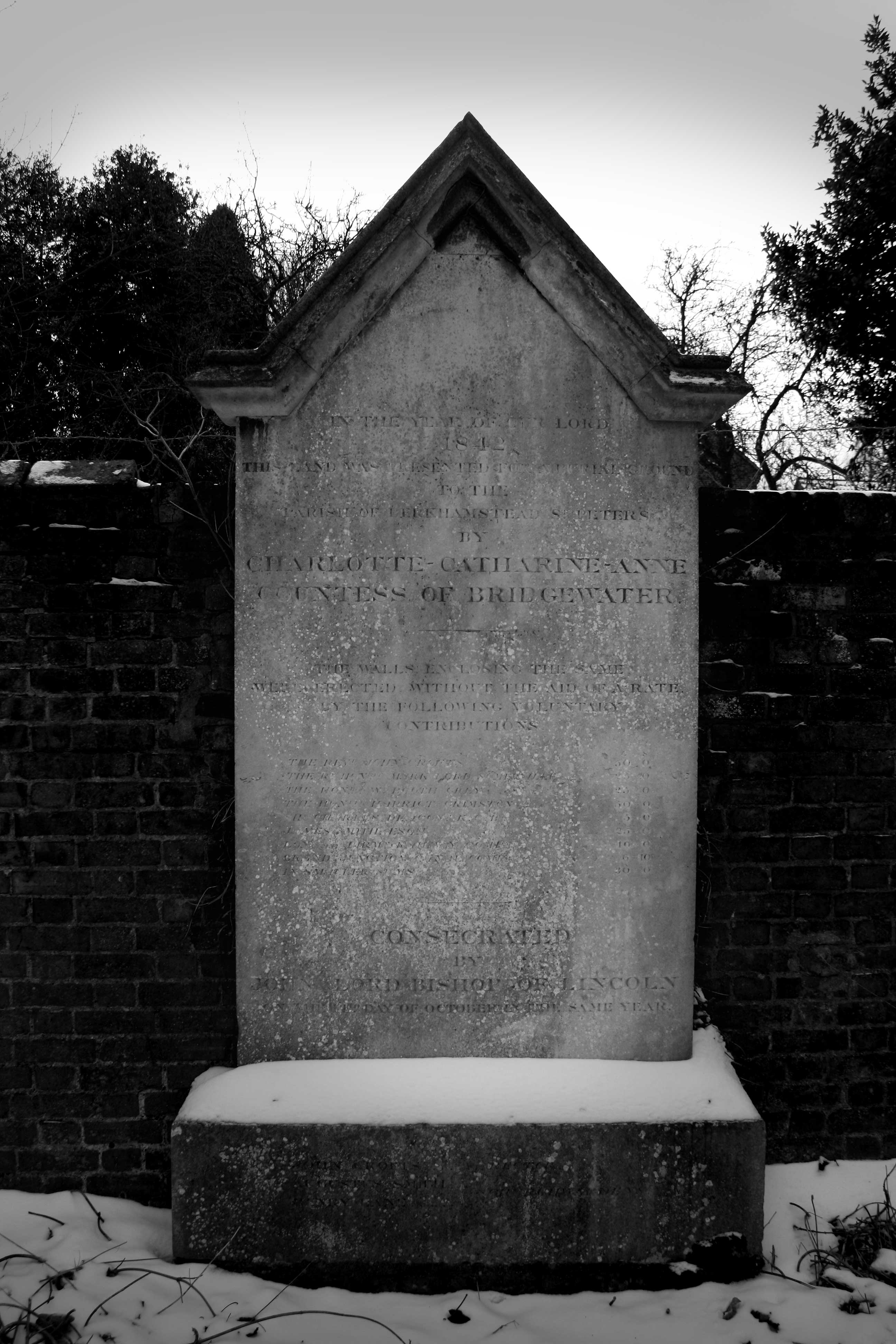
Three Close Lane Cemetery commemoration stone, 1842

The graveyard around St Peter's Church contains many old gravestones, most of which were laid flat in the late 19th century, and it now serves as a green. One remaining memorial is a large stone cross at the north-east corner of the church, the Smith-Dorrien Monument, which was erected in 1909 in memory of Mary Ann Smith-Dorrien, wife of Robert Algernon Smith-Dorrien of Haresfoot, a Colonel in the Hertfordshire Militia, and mother of Horace Smith-Dorrien. St Peter's churchyard was originally used for town burials, mostly on the north side of the church, but like many burial grounds in England at the time, it had become overcrowded by the mid-19th century. Some burials were made on the south side of the church, but the widening of the High Street limited the amount of space available.

A new detached cemetery was opened in 1842 behind the Elizabethan manor, Egerton House (now the site of the Rex Cinema), on an acre of land donated by Charlotte Catherine Anne, Countess of Bridgewater and widow of John Egerton, 7th Earl of Bridgewater. A foundation stone commemorates the donation of the Countess and the consecration of the burial ground by John Kaye, Bishop of Lincoln, on 11 October 1842. The cemetery, situated between Three Close Lane and the old St Peter's rectory and known variously as Three Close Lane Cemetery or Rectory Lane Cemetery, was extended in 1921. There are several Commonwealth War Graves in the cemetery from both World War I and World War II, and among the notable burials is the grave of General Horace Smith-Dorrien, a veteran of the Second Boer War and World War I and former Governor of Gibraltar. In 2014 the Rectory Lane Cemetery Project was founded to transform the Cemetery, creating a new community space with an enhanced wildlife domain and restored heritage features. The volunteer group, linked to the Friends of St Peters, secured funding from the Heritage Lottery Fund and the Big Lottery Fund for this scheme in 2017, enabling them to begin a 3-year project restore a neglected area and conserve local heritage for future generations.

By the late 1940s the Rectory Lane Cemetery was filling up and a new civic cemetery was opened at nearby Kingshill.

== The church today ==
The Parish of St Peter, Great Berkhamsted continues today as an active Church of England parish church. The church holds regular services of Christian worship, and the church choir sings on Sundays during the Eucharist and in a monthly service of choral evensong. The church is also frequently used as a venue for classical music concerts performed by local music groups. The church publishes a monthly magazine, Your Berkhamsted (known until 2010 as The Berkhamsted Review), which has been in existence since 1874.

St Peter's is affiliated with two Church of England schools in Berkhamsted, Victoria Infant School and the Thomas Coram School.

== Bibliography ==
- Birtchnell, Percy Charles (1972). A Short History of Berkhamsted (Revised ed.). Berkhamsted: Privately printed. OCLC 737328.
- Cobb, John Wolstenholme (1988) [originally published by Nichols & Sons, 1855 & 1883]. Two Lectures on the History and Antiquities of Berkhamsted. Biling & Sons. ISBN 1-871372-03-8.
- Tout, Mary (1885–1900). "Waltham, John de" . Dictionary of National Biography. London: Smith, Elder & Co.
- Hastie, Scott (1999). Berkhamsted: an Illustrated History. King's Langley: Alpine Press. p. 177. ISBN 0-9528631-1-1.
- Norris, R.A. (1923). Parish Church of Berkhamsted, St. Peter, Hertfordshire. T. W. Bailey.
