= Cooper baronets =

There have been nine baronetcies created for persons with the surname Cooper, one in the Baronetage of England, one in the Baronetage of Ireland and seven in the Baronetage of the United Kingdom.

- Cooper baronets of Rockbourne (1622): see the Earl of Shaftesbury
- Cooper baronets of Dublin (1758): see Sir William Cooper, 1st Baronet (c. 1689–1761)
- Cooper baronets of Gadebridge (1821): see Astley-Cooper baronets
- Cooper baronets of Walcot (1828): see Sir John Hutton Cooper, 1st Baronet (1765–1828)
- Cooper baronets of Woollahra (1863)
- Cooper baronets of Hursley (1905)
- Cooper baronets of Shenstone Court (1905)
- Cooper baronets of Berrydown Court (1920): see Sir Edward Ernest Cooper, 1st Baronet (1848–1922)
- Cooper baronets of Singleton (1941): see Sir (Francis) D'Arcy Cooper, 1st Baronet (1882–1941)

== See also ==
- Cowper baronets, of Ratling Court, Kent (1642)
