= Berkhamsted Place =

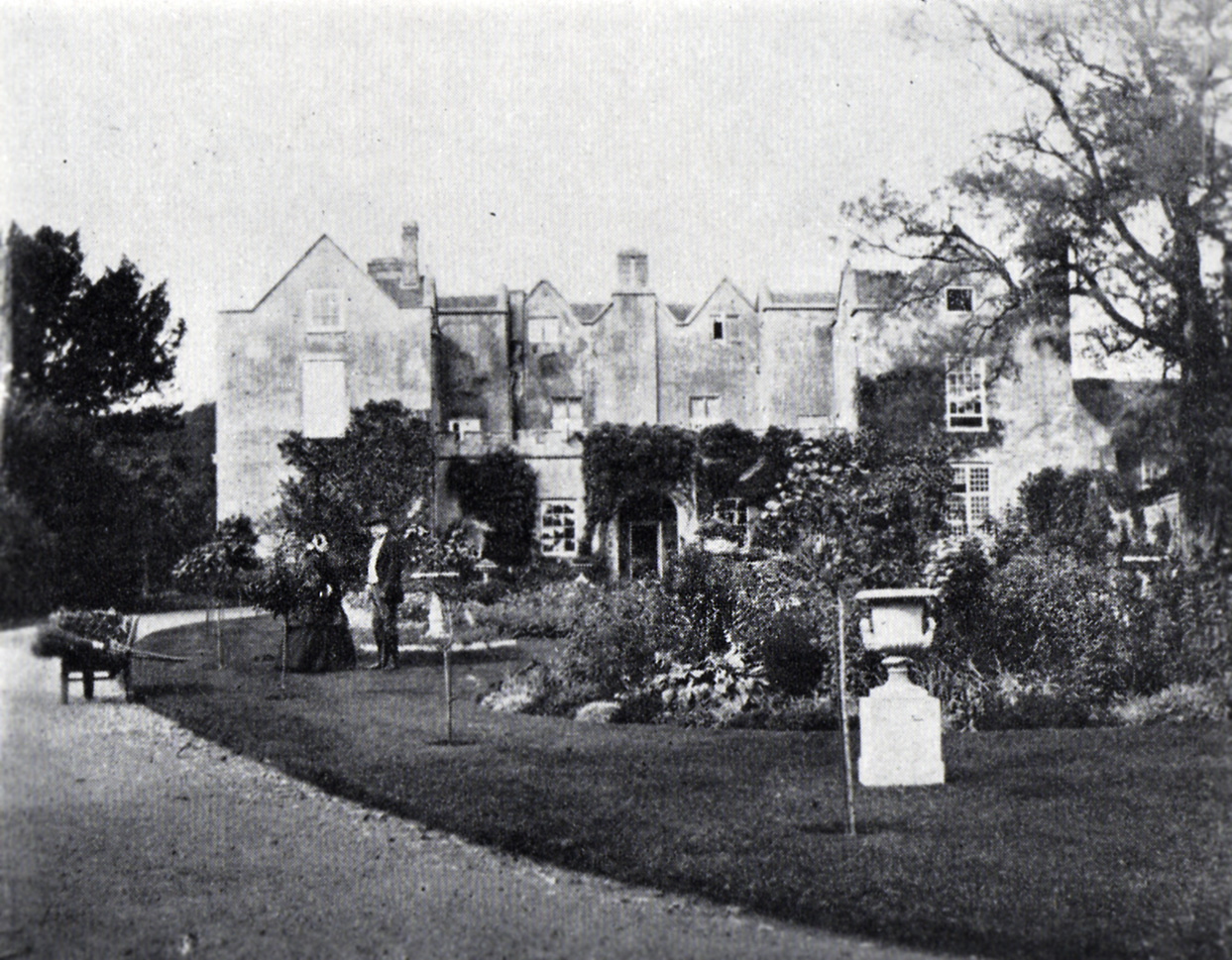
- Berkhamsted Place photographed in 1860
- Interactive map of the Berkhamsted Place area
- Alternative names: Berkhampstead Place, Barkhamsted Manor, Berkhamsted House

General information
- Type: English country house
- Architectural style: Elizabethan, faced with chequers of flint and Totternhoe stone
- Location: Castle Hill, Berkhamsted, England, United Kingdom
- Coordinates: 51.769526°N 0.565774°W
- Construction started: c. 1580
- Renovated: 1660
- Demolished: 1967
- Client: Sir Edward Carey

Renovating team
- Architect: Earl of Portland

Berkhamsted Place was an English country house which was erected sometime around 1580 in Berkhamsted, Hertfordshire, England. It was built by Sir Edward Carey, the keeper of the Jewels to Queen Elizabeth I from stones removed from Berkhamsted Castle. Several notable residents of Berkhamsted lived in the house and over the years its owners welcomed guests such as King Charles I and William Gladstone.

The house was one of two Elizabethan mansions in the town, the other being Egerton House on the High Street which was demolished in 1937. Berkhamsted Place survived fire and renovation for over 380 years before it became derelict and was demolished in 1967.

== Construction ==
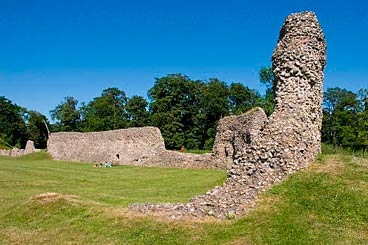
The ruins of Berkhamsted Castle

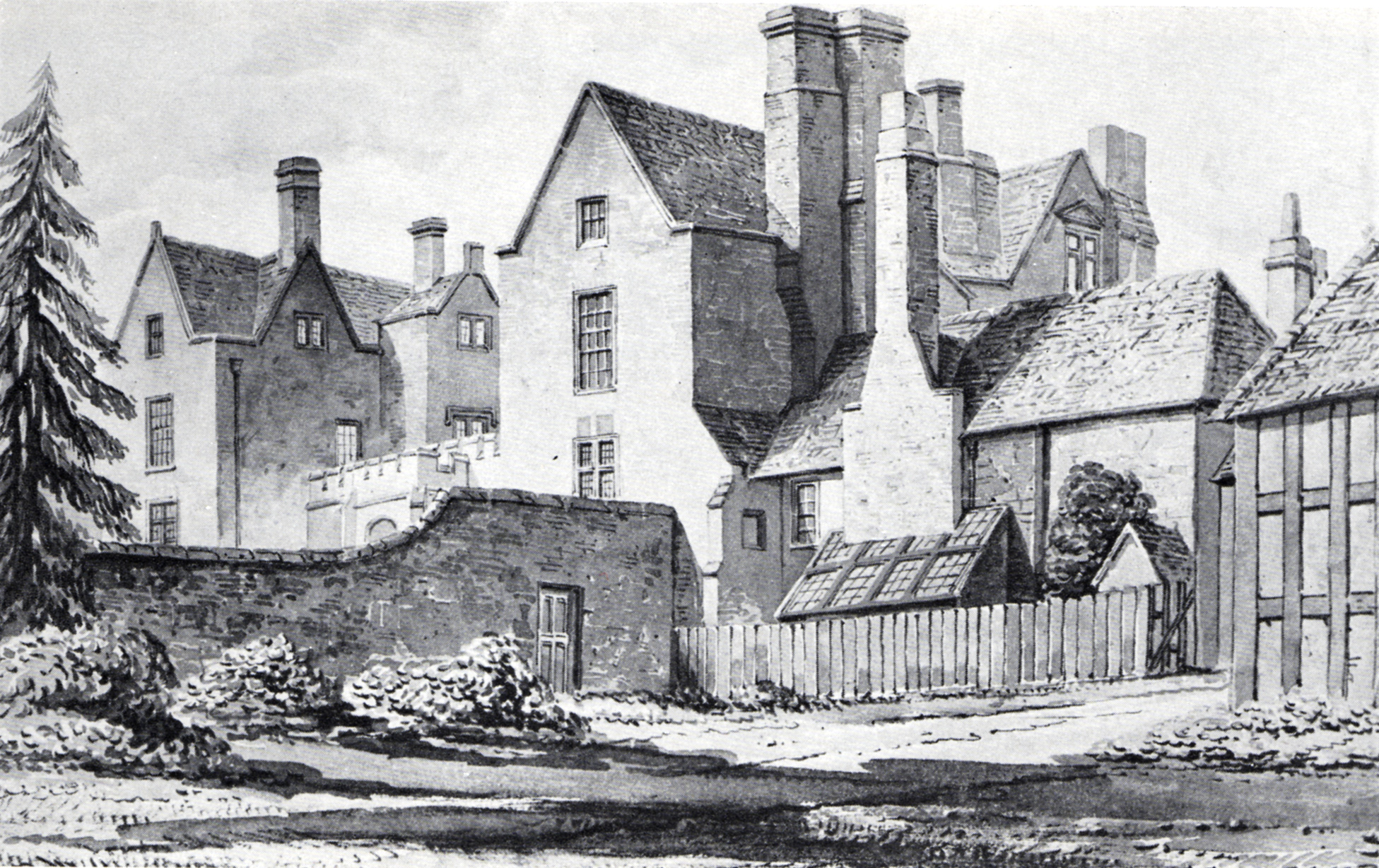
Berkhamsted Place in 1832, painted by J.C. Buckler

Queen Elizabeth I granted the manor of Berkhamsted, along with the lease of Berkhamsted Castle, to her Keeper of the Jewels, Sir Edward Carey (or Cary), in 1580. Carey was descended from the Carys of Cockington, an ancient Devon family whose lineage went back to Adam de Karry, the first Lord of Castle Karry in Somerset, in the 13th century.

Berkhamsted Castle had, by this stage, fallen into disrepair and the lease of a ruined castle was possibly intended as some sort of royal joke; Carey owed a nominal annual rent of one red rose, payable yearly on St John the Baptist's Day (24 June). Rather than live in the castle grounds, Sir Edward built for himself a mansion house on top of the hill overlooking the castle, and purloined stonework from the castle ruins to build his house.

== Architecture ==
Berkhamsted Place was a two-storey building with attics above. The plan of the house was in the shape of a letter E, with wings to the north and south-east. The walls were originally faced with 7-inch square stone chequers of flint and Totternhoe stone with brick additions and a tiled roof. An avenue of lime trees led up the hill to the house.

A survey of the house in 1650 by parliamentary commissioners, later held by the office of the Duchy of Cornwall, described the house thus:

All that capitall mess' mansion-house scituate on a hill (in the middle of th'aforesaid park), called Barkhamsted House, built with flint and Tatternell stone, cheqr fashion, wch doth much adorn and sett forth the same, and covered with slatt; consistinge of one large and spacious hall, wainscotted, and well-floored, seeled, and lighted...

According to a survey by the Royal Commission on Historical Monuments in 1910, the house was said to be in "fairly good" condition, although it noted some decay around the stonework of the original windows. The house retained part of the original courtyard house built by Sir Edward Carey, c.1580, and hall on the south-eastern side, built after the 1662 fire, occupied part of the old courtyard between the wings. The front of the house was brick with an embattled parapet and a porch with a Tudor-style four-centred arched doorway.

The survey noted that a commemorative stone could be seen below the drawing-room windows on, also facing south-east, bearing the inscription "1611", possibly marking the alterations made for Prince Henry when he purchased the house. The rest of the south-eastern side was covered in cement, and had several small projections and gables.

Much of the original decorative stonework was lost after the 1662 fire but that which was preserved could be seen on the north-western side of the house. Here, there were also two brick buttresses and two projecting octagonal brick chimneys which had been added to the building in the 17th century. At each end of the north side was a plain gable which had a three-light window, stone mullions and a transom, topped with a small stone pediment. The other windows were modern sash windows

At the north-eastern end of the house was a stone oriel window; by 1910 this was partially blocked and cut away to accommodate a newer brick chimney.

The interior of the house had been considerably altered, but a number of 17th-century features had been retained, including a decoratively carved oak fireplace, another fireplace with plaster decoration, a panelled ceiling, and a decorated plaster ceiling with moulded ribs, vine ornaments, and heads. There was also an ornate 17th-century wooden staircase with square newels, turned balusters and moulded handrail.

== History ==
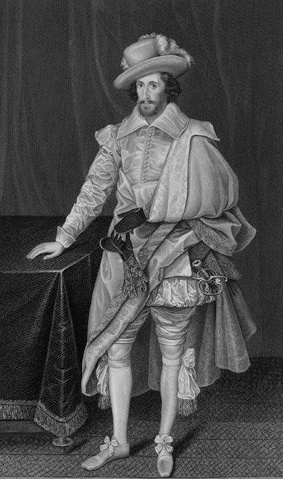
Henry Cary, 1st Viscount Falkland

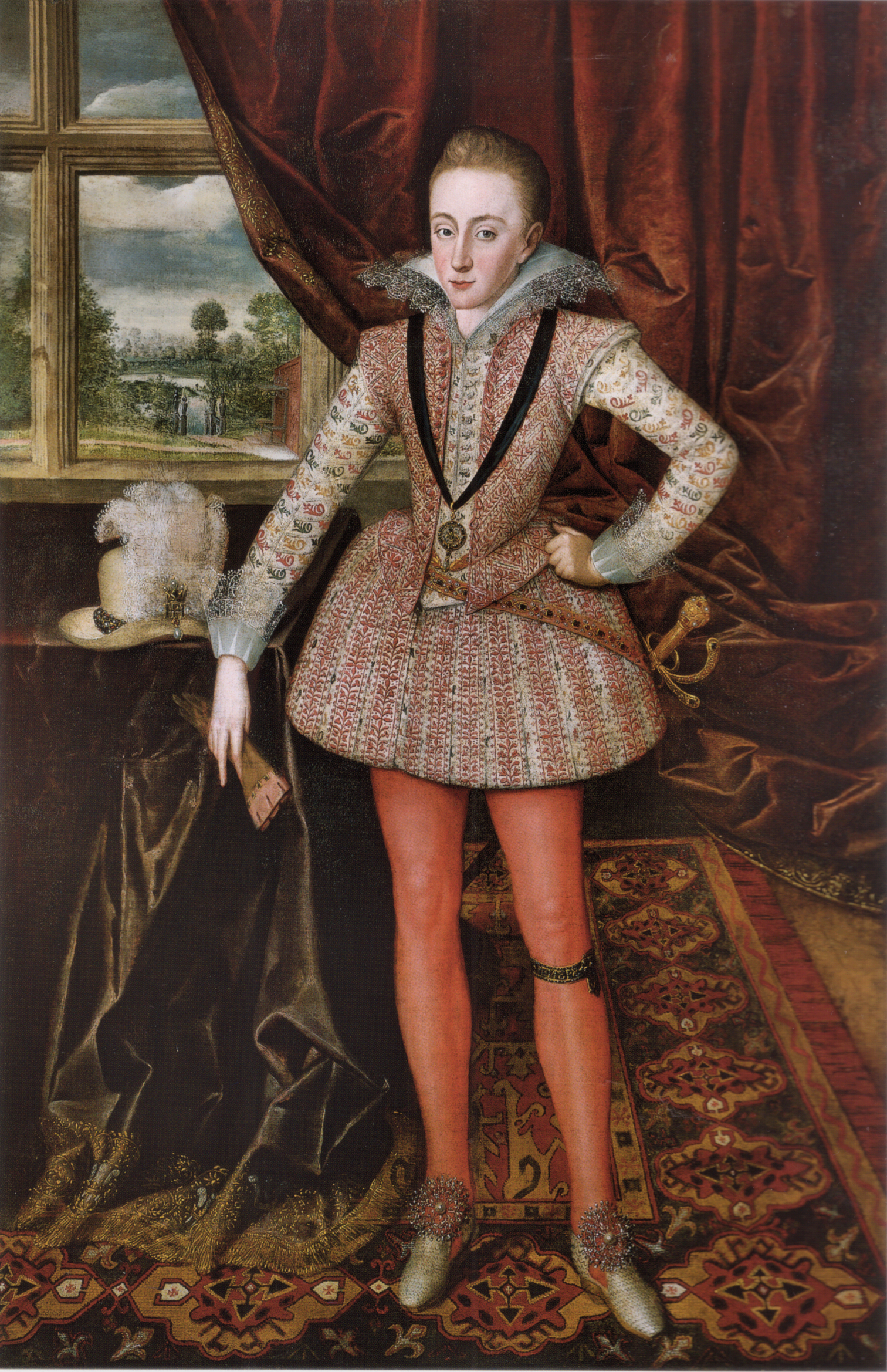
Henry Frederick, Prince of Wales c.1610

The early occupants of Berkhamsted Place

Sir Edward Carey's occupation of Berkhamsted Place was brief; in 1588 he took possession of the Manor of Aldenham and went to live in the town, leasing Berkhamsted Place to his brother, Sir Adolphus Carey. He was the first of many tenants of Berkhamsted Place, passing the tenancy on to his son, Sir Henry Carey, who was later to become Lord Falkland and Lord Deputy of Ireland. Various members of the Carey family used the house until 1612, when it was bought by Henry Frederick, Prince of Wales for the sum of £4000. Henry, who had visited Berkhamsted in May 1610, died later in 1612. The house passed to his brother, Charles, who was later crowned King Charles I.

Prince Charles leased the property to his tutor Thomas Murray and his wife Mary or Jean Drummond, who had been his nurse and had been Lady of the Privy Chamber to the prince's mother, Anne of Denmark. It is known that the young Prince Charles, then aged sixteen, paid a visit to the Murrays on 14 August 1616, when they spent an afternoon hunting in the estate, Berkhamsted Park.

During the reign of Charles I, it is known that some alterations were made to the house, supervised by Sir David Cunningham of Auchenharvie. One of Cunningham's letters to his cousin describes a royal command for him to supervise building work at Berkhamsted Place in 1629 and his account for this survives counter-signed by Thomas Trevor, on behalf of Sir John Trevor, surveyor of works at Windsor Castle.

The turbulent events of the English Civil War came to Berkhamsted Place in the 1640s when the Murrays' daughter, Ann Murray, became in a Royalist plot to protect the life of the King's second surviving son, the young Duke of York (who was later to become King James II of England, from the Parliamentarian forces. King Charles was executed in 1648, and Ann, fearing for her life as a Royalist, fled from Berkhamsted Place. Possession of the house was taken by a Berkhamsted-born soldier in Cromwell's Army, Lieutenant Colonel Daniel Axtell, aged 26, had risen in the ranks and served as Captain of the Parliamentary Guard during the execution of King Charles I.

Following the Restoration of the English monarchy; in 1660 he was hanged, drawn and quartered at Tyburn for the crime of regicide. Ann Murray was later honoured for her loyalty to the crown when King James II granted her a royal pension. In St Peter's Church, Berkhamsted, a memorial on the north wall of the old chancel commemorates James and John Murray, inscribed "youths of the most winning disposition who lived and died at Berkhamsted Place".

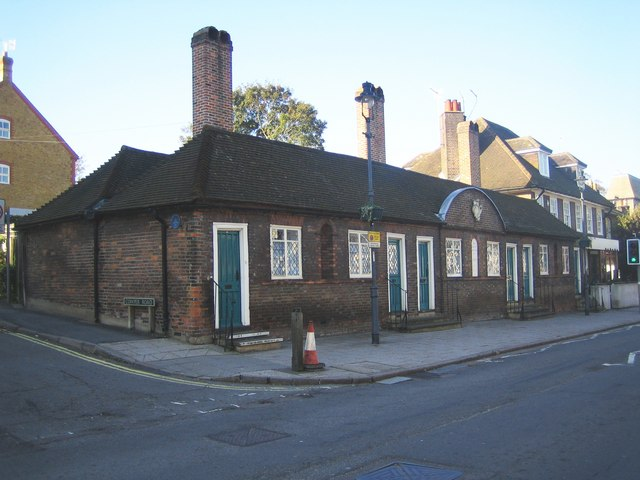
Sayer's Almshouses (1664) on Berkhamsted High Street

In 1660 the lease of Berkhamsted was taken on by the Lord Treasurer, Jerome Weston, 2nd Earl of Portland; it was during his residency that a large fire broke out, destroying two-thirds of Berkhamsted Place. Reconstruction was hastily commenced, probably financed by John Sayer, a wealthy local man who was Chief Cook to King Charles II. The central part of the house was rebuilt but the two wings which formed the side of the courtyard were never restored. Some of the original Elizabethan decorative stonework was retained on the north wall and can be seen in later photographs of the property. Sayer took ownership of the house shortly after it was rebuilt, and he lived there with his family until his death in 1662. Sayer became well known as a benefactor to the town of Berkhamsted, and his legacy enabled a row of almshouses to be built for the poor widows of the town; these houses still stand today on the High Street and bear a stone inscription "The gifte of John Sayer, 1664". Around 1690, the Dutch artist Jan Wyck painted A huntsman with a hare and hounds above Berkhamsted, which shows the church, castle, and Berkhamsted Place in the background.

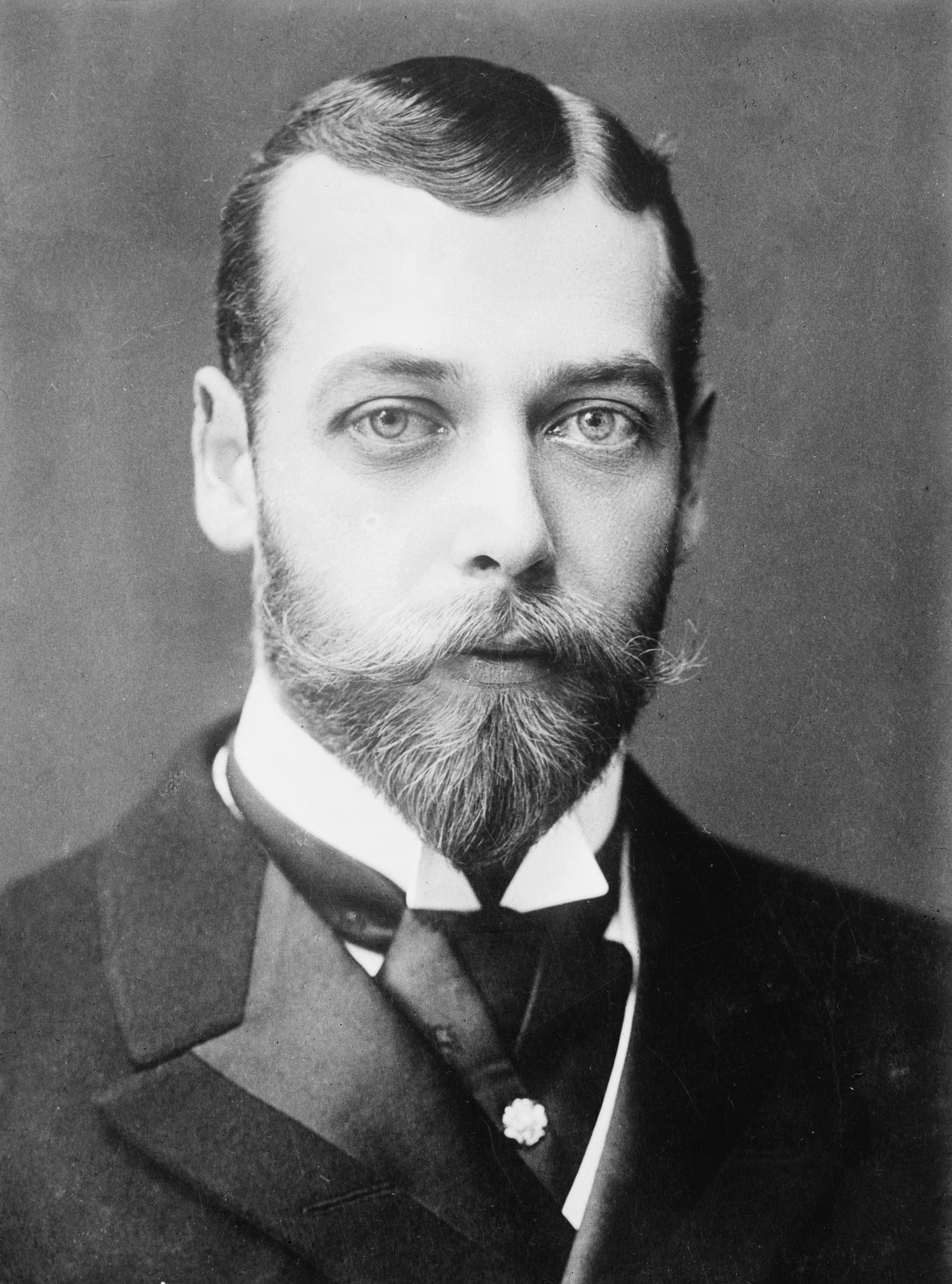
Prince George, Duke of York

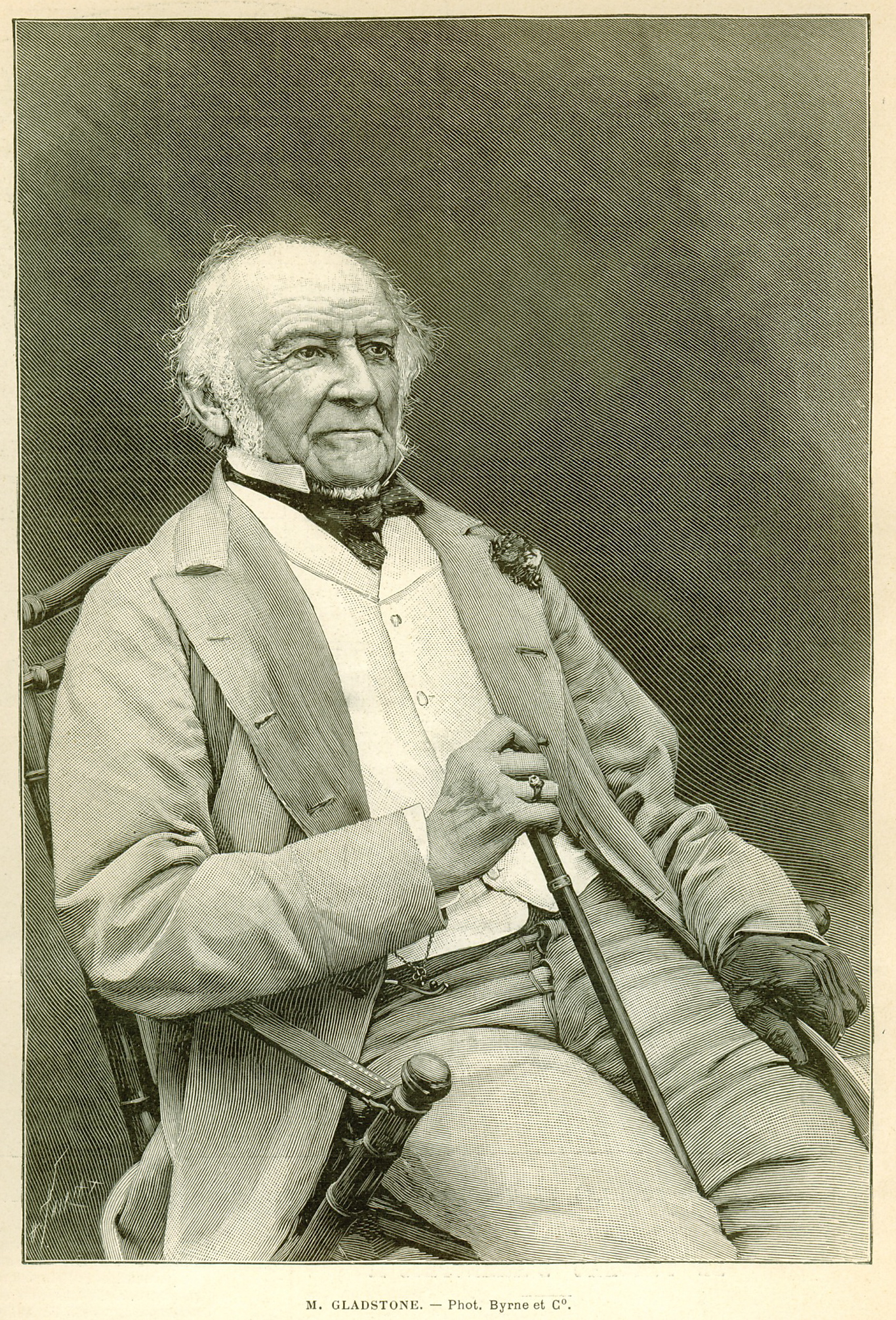
William Gladstone

Notable 20th-century guests at Berkhamsted Place

The Sayer family remained in residence at Berkhamsted Place until 1716, when they sold the lease to William Atwell; he in turn sold it to John Roper in 1718, whose family stayed in the house for nearly a century. In 1807 the lease was reassigned to John Egerton, 7th Earl of Bridgewater. The house was eventually bought outright from the estate of the Prince of Wales by Earl Brownlow.

Ownership of the property was then passed to General John Finch and his wife, notable benefactors of the town who were responsible for rebuilding the Thomas Bourne School and supporting the town hall fund.

After General Finch, the house was let to the Marquess of Hamilton, James Hamilton. It is also recorded that the house was occupied by Lady Sarah Spencer and Gertrude, Countess of Pembroke. The two ladies entertained many notable establishment figures in their fashionable country residence, including the Duke of York (who was later crowned King George V) and the Prime Minister William Gladstone.

The house was subsequently purchased by the Ram family, first occupied by a Mr S.J Ram KC and later in 1937 by his son, Sir Granville Ram, who was First Parliamentary Counsel to the Treasury.

== Decline ==
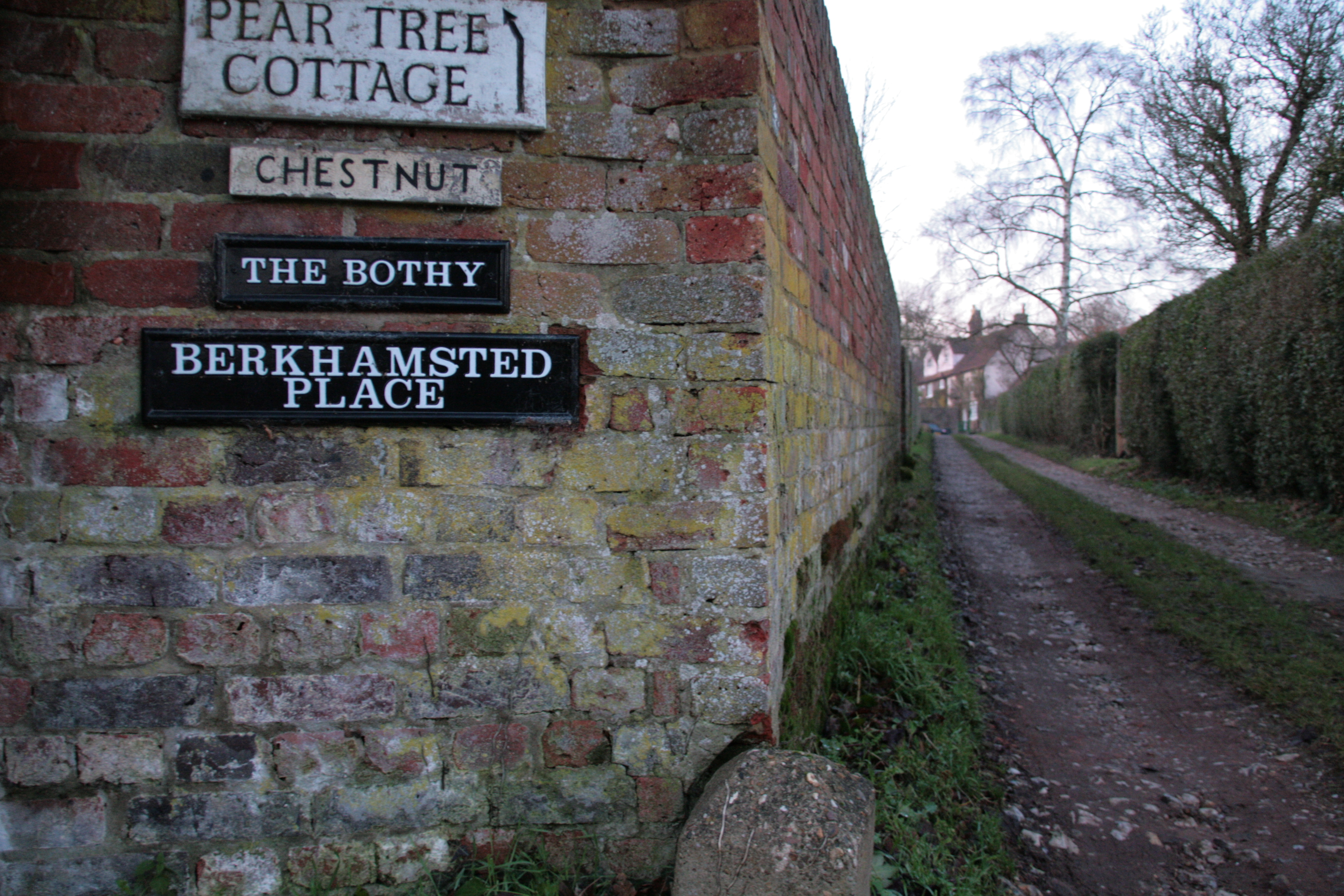
Berkhamsted Place as it appears today

Berkhamsted Place served well over the centuries as an English country house; at the time of the Second World War the house had nine bedrooms, three bathrooms and five upstairs staff bedrooms. By the 1950s, the cost of running and maintaining a fully staffed great house became prohibitive, and like many other staffed residences, the property was sold off to be converted into flats in the 1950s. The surviving 17th-century wing of the house became the studio of the renowned sculptor Reg Butler, whose 1953 work Unknown Political Prisoner won the Grand Prize in a competition held by the London Institute of Contemporary Arts.

By 1963 the house had become unoccupied and fell into dereliction and was finally demolished in 1967. Today, the site is occupied by a number of private cottages and a farm.
