= Sheep dip =

Liquid formulation of insecticide and fungicide applied to sheep

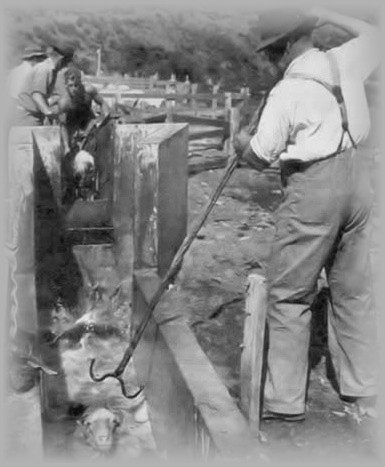
Plunge dipping sheep

Sheep dip is a liquid formulation of insecticide and fungicide that shepherds and farmers use to protect their sheep from infestation against external parasites such as itch mite (Psoroptes ovis), blow-fly, ticks and lice.

== History ==
Sheep dipping is the immersion of sheep in water containing insecticides and fungicide.

The world's first sheep dip was invented and produced by George Wilson of Coldstream, Scotland, in 1830. That dip was based on arsenic powder and was exported by package steamer from nearby Berwick-upon-Tweed. One of the most successful brands of dip to be brought to market was Cooper's Dip, which was developed in 1852 by the veterinary surgeon and industrialist William Cooper of Berkhamsted, England.

== Design ==
Sheep dip is available as wettable powders, pastes, solutions, or suspensions which are used to prepare diluted solutions or suspensions. The term is used both for the formulation itself, and the trough in which the sheep is completely immersed.

There are two broad classes of sheep dip: organophosphorus compounds, from which chemical warfare agents were later developed, and synthetic pyrethroids. Organophosphorus compounds are very toxic to humans exposed even to very low doses, as they travel easily through the skin, and are cumulatively toxic.

Plunge sheep dips may be permanent in-ground structures, often of concrete, or mobile transportable steel structures. Invented after the permanent plunge dip was the rotating, power spray dip. These dips are redundant in the major sheep breeding countries, as the backliners and jetting provide a better alternative.

== Negative health and environmental effects ==
Sheep dips have been found to cause soil contamination and water pollution. They contain chemical insecticides that are highly toxic to aquatic plants and animals. For this reason, it is important that the dip and dipped sheep are well managed to avoid spreading the chemicals and causing water pollution.

Some chemicals used in sheep dips are known to have been harmful. A sheep dip based on organophosphates can cause organophosphate poisoning.

== See also ==
- Fly strike in sheep
