= History of Berkhamsted =

History of a town in England

Berkhamsted was first mentioned in 970 CE and was recorded as a burbium (ancient borough) in the Domesday Book in 1086. Archeology traces a settlement from Neolithic times, through the Bronze Age, the Iron Age, the Roman Occupation to the Norman Conquest. During the Middle Ages the town of Berkhamsted was a busy wool trading centre. The oldest-known extant jettied timber-framed building in Great Britain, built between 1277 and 1297, survives in the 21st century as a shop on the town's high street.

== Prehistory ==
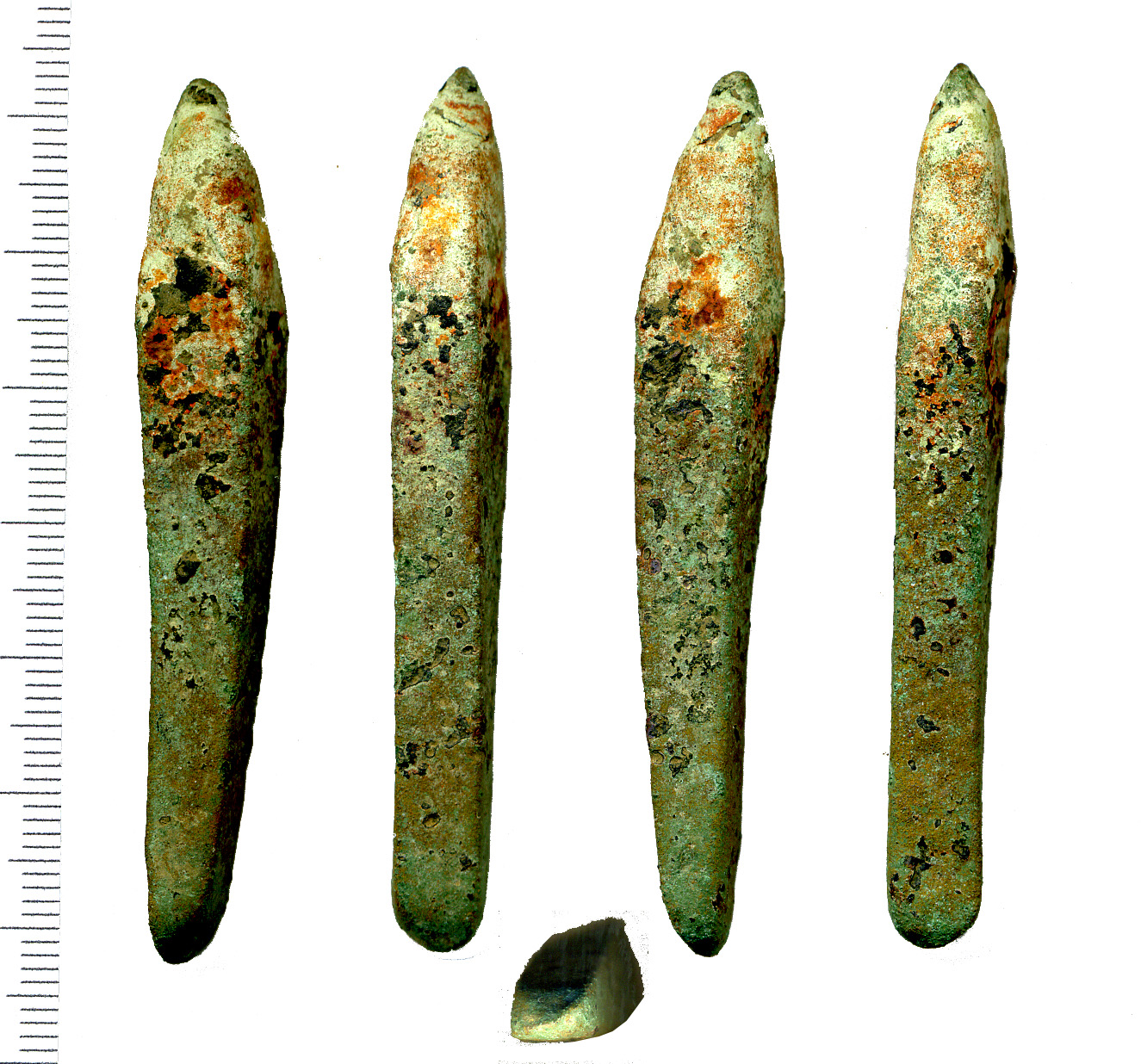
An Early Middle Bronze Age (c. 1500 to 1300 BC) copper chisel found in Berkhamsted

Neolithic, Bronze Age, Iron Age and Roman artefacts show that the Berkhamsted area of the Bulbourne Valley has been settled for over 5,000 years. The discovery of a large number of worked flint chips provides Neolithic evidence of on-site flint knapping in the centre of Berkhamsted. Several settlements dating from the Neolithic to the Iron Age (about 4500–100 BC) have been discovered south of Berkhamsted. Three sections of a late Bronze Age to Iron Age (1200–100 BC) bank and ditch, sixteen feet (five metres) wide by seven to thirteen feet (two to four metres) high and known as Grim's Ditch, are found on the south side of the Bulbourne Valley. Another Iron Age dyke with the same name is on Berkhamsted Common, on the north side of the valley.

In the late Iron Age, before the Roman occupation, the valley would have been within Catuvellauni territory. The Bulbourne Valley was rich in timber and iron ore. In the late Iron Age, a four-square-mile (ten-square-kilometre) area around Northchurch became a major iron production centre, now considered to be one of the most important late Iron Age and Roman industrial areas in England. Iron production led to the settlement of a Roman town at Cow Roast, about two miles (three kilometres) northwest of Berkhamsted. Four Roman first century AD iron smelting bloomeries at Dellfield (one mile (two kilometres) northwest of the town centre) provide evidence of industrial activity in Berkhamsted. Production ceased at the end of the Roman period. Other evidence of Roman-British occupation and activity in the Berkhamsted area, includes a pottery kiln on Bridgewater Road. The town's high street still follows the line of the Roman-engineered Akeman Street, which had been a pre-existing route from St Albans (Verulamium) to Cirencester (Corinium).

== Roman period ==
The High Street is on a pre-Roman route known by its Saxon name: Akeman Street. During Roman occupation the countryside close to Verulamium was subdivided into a series of farming estates. The Berkhamsted area appears to have been divided into two or three farming estates, each including one or more masonry villa buildings, with tiled roofs and underfloor heating.

- The remains of a villa were found close to the river in 1973 in the adjacent village of Northchurch. The oldest building, made of timber, was built in AD 60, rebuilt using stone in the early 2nd century, and enlarged to a ten-room building around AD 150. The house may have been empty for a period, reoccupied in the 4th century, and abandoned in the late 4th or early 5th century.
- A Roman-British villa, dyke, and temple were found 1.25 miles (2.0 km) NNW of the castle, near Frithsden, at the edge of the Berkhamsted Golf Course. Excavations in 1954 revealed masonry foundations and tesserae floors. Together, the villa, dyke and temple form a unique complex, suggesting occupation in the late Iron Age and Roman period.
- Two flint and tile walls from a Roman building were found north of Berkhamsted Castle in 1970. The construction of the castle's earthworks in the Middle Ages may have damaged this building.

== Anglo-Saxon settlement ==
The earliest written reference to Berkhamsted is in the will of Ælfgifu (died AD 970), queen consort of King Eadwig of England (r. 955–959), who bequeathed large estates in five counties, including Berkhamsted. (Note: Æthelgifu's will is one of only seventeen existing wills in Old English, and it is the most extensive of them. It gives much more detail on slave and land ownership in this period than any other document, and shows that a woman could have considerable wealth. The will is written on vellum in a minuscule hand, and the original still exists; an American consortium bought it in 1969, and it is now in New Jersey.) The location and extent of early Saxon settlement of Berkhamsted is not clear. Rare Anglo-Saxon pottery dating from the 7th century onwards has been found between Chesham Road and St John's Well Lane, with water mills near Mill Street in use from the late 9th century, show that an Anglo-Saxon settlement existed in the centre of modern-day Berkhamsted. The nearest known structural evidence of the Anglo-Saxon period are in the south and west walls of St Mary's Northchurch, one mile (two kilometres) to the north-west of modern Berkhamsted. The church may have been an important minster, attached to a high status Anglo-Saxon estate, which became part of the medieval manor of Berkhamsted after the Norman conquest.

The parish of Berkhamsted St Mary's (in Northchurch) once stretched five miles (8.0 km) from the hamlet of Dudswell, through Northchurch and Berkhamsted to the former hamlet of Bourne End. Within Berkhamsted, the Chapel of St James was a small church near St John's Well (a 'holy well' that was the town's principal source of drinking water in the Middle Ages). The parish of this church (and later that of St Peter's) was an enclave of about 4,000 acres (1,600 ha) surrounded by Berkhamsted St Mary's parish. (Note: This left an exclave of the St Mary's parish, which later became the village of Bourne End, southeast of Berkhamsted.) By the 14th century the adjoining village of "Berkhamsted St Mary" or "Berkhamsted Minor" name had become "North Church", later "Northchurch", to distinguish the village from the town of Berkhamsted.

== 1066 and the Domesday survey ==
Following the defeat of King Harold by William the Conqueror at the Battle of Hastings, the Anglo-Saxon leadership surrendered to the Normans at their encampment at Berkhamsted as recorded in the Anglo-Saxon Chronicle. From 1066 to 1495, Berkhamsted Castle was a favoured residence of royalty and notable historical figures, including King Henry II, Edward the Black Prince, Thomas Becket and Geoffrey Chaucer. In the 13th and 14th centuries, the town was a wool trading centre, with a busy local market. The oldest-known extant jettied timber-framed building in Great Britain, built between 1277 and 1297, survives as a shop on the town's high street.

The Anglo-Saxons surrendered the crown of England to William the Conqueror at Berkhamsted in early December 1066. After William defeated and killed Harold II at the Battle of Hastings in October, he failed in an attempt to capture London from the south. William led his army around London, crossing the River Thames at Wallingford, "laying waste" while travelling through southeast England. At Berkhamsted, he received the surrender of Edgar the Ætheling (heir to the English throne), Archbishop Ealdred, Earl Edwin, Earl Morcar and the leaders of London. It is not known why the town was chosen as the meeting place, except that it was in a defensive location north-west of London. (Note: Historians in the past, have believed the town was of Mercian importance or in the existence of a pre–Norman conquest fortification (there is reference to land called "Oldeburgh"). The Anglo-Saxon word burgh hints at a pre-conquest fortification. The notable early 20th century historian G. M. Trevelyan, and earlier historians Samuel Lewis and Sir Henry Chauncy, believed that the town was once an important Mercian settlement. Two medieval ditches have been excavated in recent years, both of which were discovered on Bridgewater Road, north of the river, that may have been part of a ditch that surrounded the early medieval town.) William was crowned in Westminster Abbey on Christmas Day, 1066. After his coronation, William granted the "Honour of Berkhamsted" to his half-brother, Robert, Count of Mortain, who after William became the largest landholder in the country. Robert built a wooden fortification that later became a royal retreat for the monarchs of the Norman and Plantagenet dynasties.

According to the Domesday Book, the lord of Berkhamsted before the Norman conquest was Edmer Ator (also referred to as Eadmer Atule), thegn of Edward the Confessor and King Harold. (Note: Edmer Ator was evidently a senior landholding noble who had held 36 places over 7 counties prior to the Norman conquest, as recorded in the Domesday Book.) The Domesday survey records that there was enough land for 26 plough teams, but only 15 working teams. There were two flour mills (Upper and Lower Mill), woodland for 1,000 pigs, and a vineyard. The total population was calculated to be either 37 or 88 households; the families included 14 villagers, 15 smallholders, 6 slaves, a priest, a dyke builder (possibly working on the earthworks of the castle) and 52 burgesses. Some historians have argued that the number of 52 burgesses in Berkhamsted was a clerical error, as it is a large number for a small town. Berkhamsted was described in the Domesday Book as a burbium (ancient borough) in the Tring Hundred. (Note: Later in the Middle Ages the Tring Hundred merged with the Danais Hundred, "which overlapped it", to form the Dacorum Hundred. Danais referred to Danish settlers in the area. A monk writing about this area described it as "the Hundred of the Danes", using the word Daneis. The word was later incorrectly transcribed as "Danicorum" and subsequently shortened to "Dacorum".) Marjorie Chibnall argued that Robert, Count of Mortain intended Berkhamsted to be both a commercial and a defensive centre; while John Hatcher and Edward Miller believed that the 52 burgesses were involved in trade, but it is unknown if the burgesses existed before the conquest.

== Royal medieval castle (11th to 15th centuries) ==
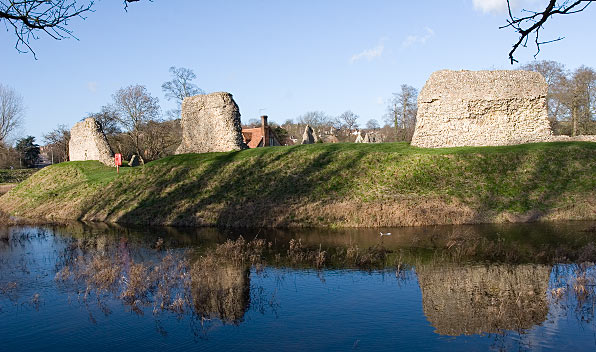
View across the Inner moat towards the bailey walls of Berkhamsted Castle

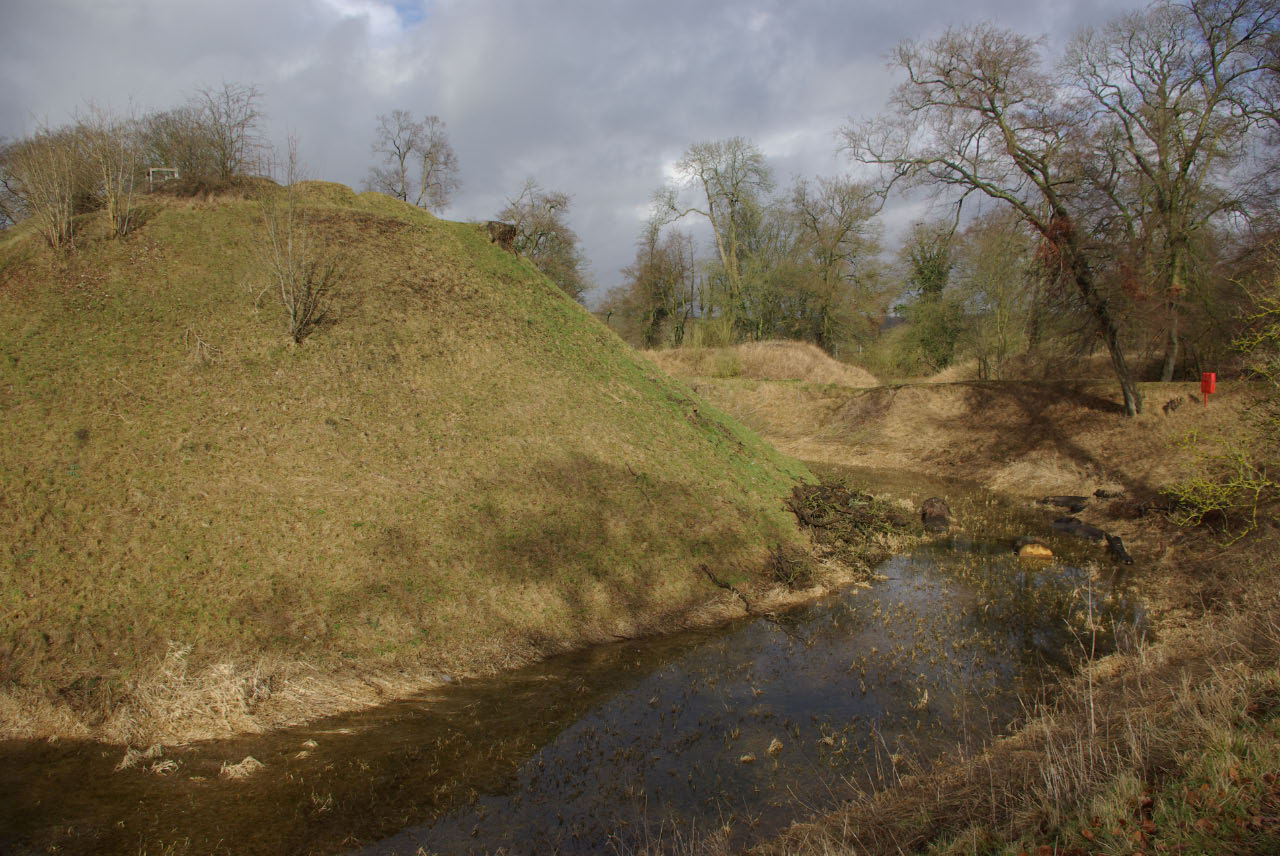
A view of the castle motte, moat, middle bank and outer earthworks

Berkhamsted Castle is a (now ruined) motte-and-bailey Norman castle. Radiocarbon dating of organic remains from within the motte indicates that it was probably built post-1066 (a dyke builder is recorded in the town at the time of the Domesday Book). The castle was a high-status residence and an administrative centre for large estates (including the Earldom of Cornwall). Through the High and Late Middle Ages the close proximity of the royal castle and court helped fuel Berkhamsted's growth, prosperity and sense of importance. It created jobs for the local population, both within the castle itself and also, for example, in the large deer park and in the vineyard, which were maintained alongside the castle.

After Robert, Count of Mortain, the castle passed to his heir William, who rebelled against Henry I and lost the castle to the king. In 1155 Henry in turn gave it to his favourite Thomas Becket, who held it till 1165. Becket was later alleged to have spent over £300 on improvements to the castle, a claim that led Henry to accuse him of corruption and may have contributed to his downfall. Henry II extensively used the castle, making it one of his favourite residences. Both King Richard I and King John gave the castle to their queens, Berengaria of Navarre and Isabella of Angoulême, respectively. In King John's reign, Geoffrey Fitz Peter (c. 1162–1213), (Note: The patronymic is sometimes rendered "Fitz Piers", since he was the son of Piers de Lutegareshale, forester of Ludgershal.) Earl of Essex and the Chief Justiciar of England (effectively the king's principal minister) held the Honour and Manor of Berkhamsted from 1199 to 1212. During his time in the castle he was responsible for the foundation of the new parish church of St Peter (the size of which reflects the growing prosperity of the town); two hospitals, St John the Baptist and St John the Evangelist (one of which was a leper hospital), which survived until 1516; and for the layout of the town.

Following the signing of Magna Carta (1215), King John's reneging on the royal charter, the castle was besieged during the ensuing civil war, known as the First Barons' War, between John and barons supported by Prince Louis (the future Louis VIII of France), the French laid siege to Berkhamsted Castle (only a quarter of a mile from the town centre) in late December 1216. The queen's constable of the castle was the German Walerand Teutonicus.

After reducing the castle of Hertford, Louis marched on St Nicholas's day (6 December) to the castle of Berkhamsted and surrounded it with his engines of war. Whilst the English barons, after pitching their tents, were employed in setting them in order, the knights and soldiers of the garrison made a sally, seized the baggage and conveyances of the barons and gained possession of the standard of William de Mandeville with which they returned to the castle, regretting that they could do no further injury to them. On the same day, whilst the barons were sitting at table, the knights and soldiers of the garrison again made a sally, and, in order to put the barons in confusion, they carried before them the standard which they had taken a short time before, and thought to come on them unawares, but the latter were forewarned of this, and drove them back to the castle. When the following day dawned Louis ordered the petrarie (stone-throwing machines) and other engines of war to be erected around the city, which being done, they kept up a destructive shower of stones: but Waleran, a German, well tried in warfare, made a brave resistance against them and caused great slaughter amongst the excommunicated French.

—The contemporary chronicler, Roger of Wendover, based at St Albans abbey, 12 miles from Berkhamsted, describing the siege

During the siege, Prince Louis introduced a new destructive siege engine to England at Berkhamsted, the counterweight trebuchet (or mangonel). After a siege of twenty days the young new King (Henry III) ordered his constable to surrender the castle to Louis on 20 December. Following the siege at Berkhamsted Louis suffered several defeats. 11 September 1217 Louis signed the Treaty of Lambeth, relinquishing his claim to the English throne and surrendering French-held castles including Berkhamsted. Walerand went on to hold several other posts including the senior position of Lord Warden of the Cinque Ports. In the 13th and 14th centuries, the town was a wool trading centre, with a busy local market. The oldest-known extant jettied timber-framed building in Great Britain, built between 1277 and 1297, survives as a shop on the town's high street. In 1227, Henry III's younger brother, Richard of Cornwall, was given the manor and castle, beginning the long association of the castle with the Earls and later the Dukes of Cornwall. (Note: One of the wealthiest men in Europe, Richard, 1st Earl of Cornwall, was elected King of Germany, or Holy Roman Emperor, in 1256.) Richard redeveloped the castle as a palatial residence and the centre for the administration of the Earldom of Cornwall. Richard's coat of arms as Earl of Cornwall, along with bezants, is included in Berkhamsted's coat of arms. Richard's wife, Sanchia of Provence, died in the castle in 1260. Richard was succeeded by his son, Edmund, 2nd Earl of Cornwall, who founded Ashridge Priory, a college of the monastic order of Bonhommes, in 1283. In 1300, after Edmund died, Edward I took the castle; he subsequently granted it to his second queen, Margaret of France. In 1309, Edward I's and Margaret's son, Edward II, granted Berkhamsted to his favourite, Piers Gaveston. In 1317, the castle was given to Edward II's queen, Isabella of France.

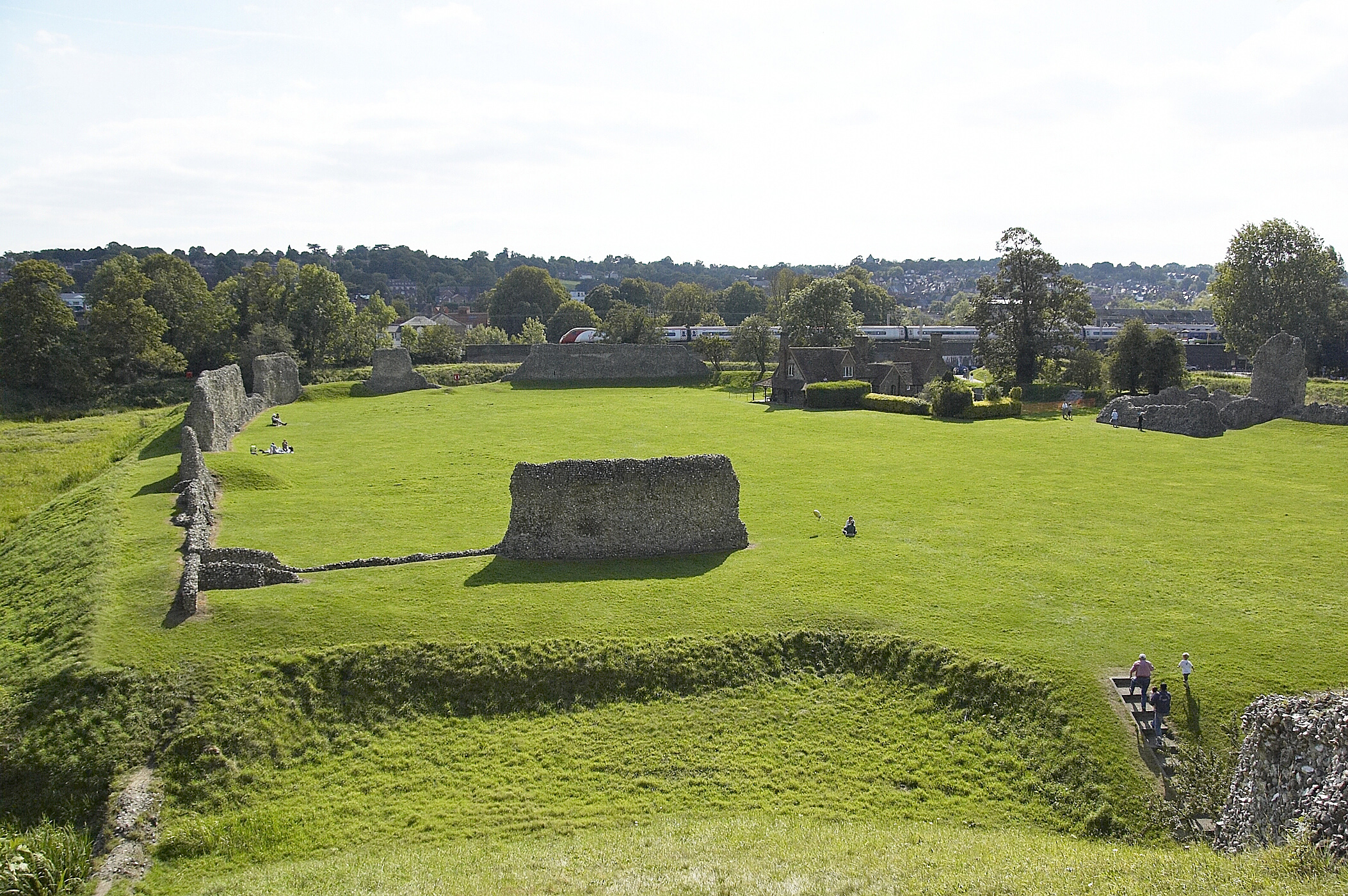
The castle's bailey viewed from the Norman motte (Enlarged: A train can be seen passing close to the castle, with the town to the south beyond.)

Edward III further developed the castle and gave it (as part of the Duchy of Cornwall) to his son, Edward, the Black Prince, who expanded the hunting grounds. The castle was used to hold royal prisoners, including John II of France. In 1361, Edward the Black Prince and Joan, the Maid of Kent, spent their honeymoon in Berkhamsted. Under Edward the Black Prince, Berkhamsted become a centre of English longbow archery. A decisive factor in the English victory at the Battle of Crécy (1346) was the introduction of this new weapon onto the Western European battlefield. The longbow was a superior weapon to the cumbersome and slower crossbow. The Berkhamsted bowmen successfully took part in this significant battle in medieval Western European history. The Black Prince was supported at the Battle of Crecy by local bowmen Everard Halsey, John Wood, Stephen of Champneys, Robert Whittingham, Edward le Bourne, Richard of Gaddesden and Henry of Berkhamsted (who was rewarded with 2d a day and appointed porter of Berkhamsted Castle after he saved the prince's baggage at the Battle of Poitiers). Richard II inherited Berkhamsted Castle in 1377 and gave it to his favourites, Robert de Vere and John Holland.

In 1400, Henry IV lived in the castle after he deposed Richard, and he used the castle to imprison others attempting to obtain the throne. During this time, Geoffrey Chaucer – later famous for writing The Canterbury Tales – oversaw renovation work on the castle in his role as Clerk of the Works at Berkhamsted. It is unknown how much time he spent at Berkhamsted, but he knew John of Gaddesden, who lived in nearby Little Gaddesden and was the model for the Doctor of Phisick in The Canterbury Tales. Henry V and Henry VI owned the castle, the latter making use of it until he was overthrown in 1461. In 1469, Edward IV gave the castle to his mother, Cecily Neville, Duchess of York. The arrival of Neville and her household at Berkhamsted had a significant social and financial impact on the town. Men and women from the town joined her service, such as Robert Incent who became her secretary and whose memorial brass can still be seen in St Peter's Church in Berkhamsted. Mother to both Edward IV and Richard III, grandmother to Edward V, and mother in law to Henry VII, she was the last person to live in the castle.

=== Recent history of the castle ===
In 1833, the castle was the first building to receive statutory protection in the United Kingdom. In 1834, construction of the railway embankment demolished the castle's gatehouse and adjacent earthworks. Today the castle ruins are managed by a charitable trust, the Berkhamsted Castle Trust, in partnership with English Heritage, on behalf of the Duchy of Cornwall (which still officially owns the site), and are freely open to the public.

== Medieval market town (12th to 15th centuries) ==
The town continued to develop separately on the old Akeman Street 0.4 miles (0.6 km) to the south of the castle and to the west of St Peter's Church; with a triangle formed by Mill Street, Castle Street and Back Lane pointing towards the castle. In 1156, Henry II officially recognised Berkhamsted as a town in a royal charter, which confirmed the laws and customs enjoyed under Edward the Confessor, William I and Henry I, and freed the town's merchants from all tolls and dues. The charter also stated that no market could be set up within 7 miles (11 km) of the town.

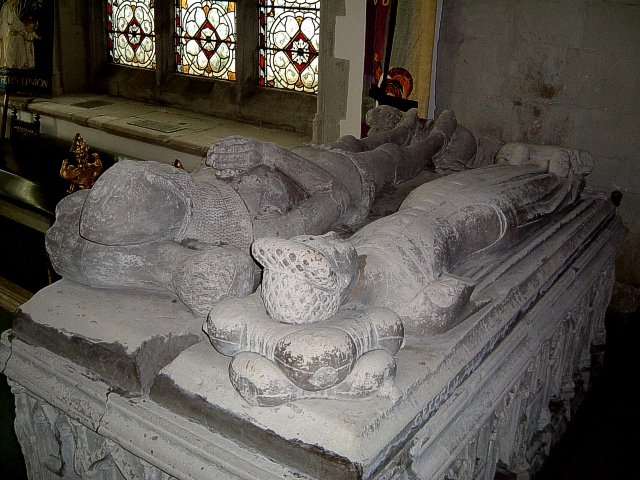
Tomb of Henry of Berkhamsted (who served under Edward the Black Prince at the battles of Crécy and Poitiers) and his Lady

The town became a trading centre on an important trade route in the 12th and 13th centuries, and received more royal charters. In 1216, Henry III relieved the men and merchants of the town from all tolls and taxes everywhere in England, and the English Plantagenet possessions in France, Normandy, Aquitaine and Anjou. The growing wool trade brought prosperity to Berkhamsted from the 12th century until the early Tudor period. Four wealthy Berkhamsted wool merchants were amongst a group in Bruges to whom Edward III wrote in 1332, and Berkhamsted merchants sold cloth to the royal court.

In 1217, Henry III recognised by royal charter the town's oldest institution, Berkhamsted's pre-existing market. (Note: The market had been in existence since at least 1086. It was originally held on a Sunday, but by this charter it was changed to Monday, as the rector of the new St Peter's Church objected to the noise. The market is now held on a Saturday.) Trades within medieval Berkhamsted were extensive: early in the 13th century the town had a merchant, two painters, a goldsmith, a forester, two farriers, two tailors, a brewer of mead, a blacksmith, carpenters, wood turners, tool makers, a manufacturer of roofing tiles and wine producers. In the mid–13th century, a banker, the wealthy Abraham of Berkhamsted, financier to the Earl of Cornwall, lived in the town; this was unusual for a small town in a time of heightened persecution of Jews.

A 1290 taxation list mentions a brewer, a lead burner, a carpenter, leather workers, a fuller, a turner, a butcher, a fishmonger, a barber, an archer, a tailor, a cloth-napper, a miller, a cook, a seller of salt and a huntsman. At this time, larger houses of merchants and castle officials appeared on the south side of the high street (including 173 High Street, the oldest known extant jettied building in England). In 1307 Berkhamsted was a large town by English medieval standards with an estimated population of 2,000 to 2,500. In 1355, there were five butchers, two bakers, nine brewers, two cobblers, a pelter, a tanner, five cloth dyers, six wheelwrights, three smiths, six grain merchants, a skinner and a baker/butcher. In the 14th century, Berkhamsted (recorded as "Berchamstede") was considered to be one of the "best" market towns in the country. In a survey of 1357, Richard Clay was found to own a butcher's shop twelve feet (four metres) wide, William Herewood had two shops, and there were four other shops eight feet (two metres) in length. In 1440, there is a reference to lime kilns.

The town benefited when Edmund, 2nd Earl of Cornwall, founded Ashridge Priory in 1283, two miles (three kilometres) away and within the castle's park. At the foundation of the abbey, the Earl donated a phial claimed to contain Christ's blood. Pilgrims from all over Europe passed through the town to see the holy relic. The abbey grew quite wealthy as a result. Edward I held parliament at the abbey in 1290 and spent Christmas there. Berkhamsted burgesses sent two members to parliament in 1320, 1338 and 1341, but the town was not represented again. In the mid-14th century, the Black Prince took advantage of the Black Death to extend the castle's park by 65 acres (26 ha), eventually producing a park covering 991 acres (401 ha). In the 15th century, the town was reaffirmed as a borough by a royal charter granted by Edward IV (1442–1483), which decreed that no other market town was to be set up within 11 miles (18 km).

== Castle abandoned, the town in decline (16th to late 18th centuries) ==
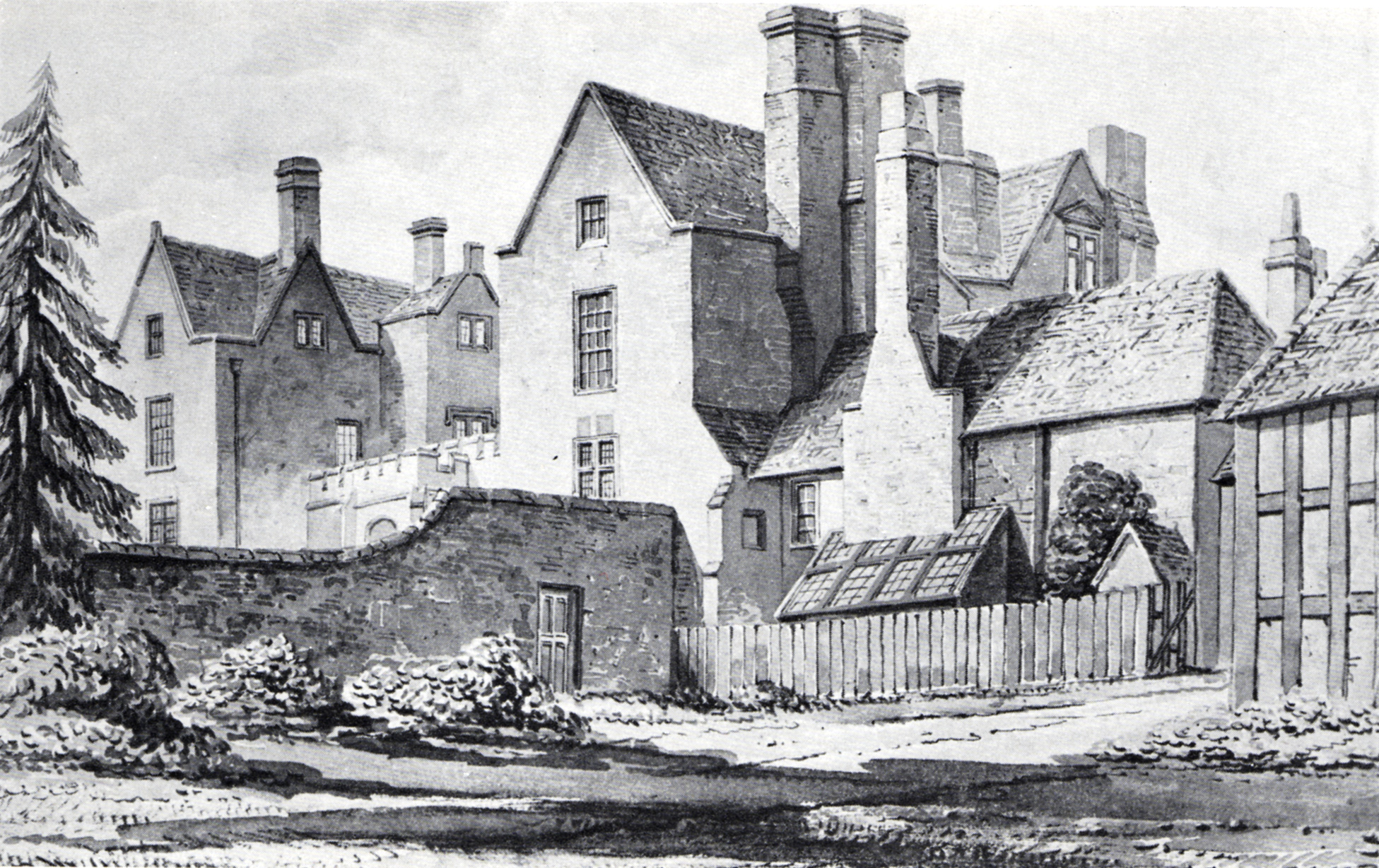
Berkhamsted Place 1832

After the castle was abandoned in 1495, the town went into decline, losing its borough status in the second half of the 17th century. Colonel Daniel Axtell, captain of the Parliamentary Guard at the trial and execution of King Charles I in 1649, was among those born in Berkhamsted.

In the 16th century, the town fell into decline after abandonment of the castle following the death of Cicely Neville, Duchess of York, in 1495, and the rise of the nearby town of Hemel Hempstead (which was granted a Charter of Incorporation by Henry VIII on 29 December 1539). The population of the town in 1563 has been estimated at only 545. In 1580, the castle ruins and the park were leased by Elizabeth I to Sir Edward Carey, for the nominal rent of one red rose each year. Stone from the castle was used to build Berkhamsted Place, a local school, and other buildings in the late 16th century. Brewing and maltings was noted as one of the town's principal industries in the reign of Elizabeth. Around 1583, a new market house was erected west of St Peter's Church at the end of Middle Row (alternatively named Le Shopperowe or Graball Row). The market house was destroyed in a fire in 1854. In 1612, Berkhamsted Place was bought by Henry Frederick, Prince of Wales for £4,000. Henry died later that year, and bequeathed the house to his brother Charles (later King Charles I), who leased the property to his tutor, Thomas Murray, and his wife, Mary Murray, who had been his nurse and Lady of the Privy Chamber to the prince's mother. John Norden wrote in 1616 that the making of malt was then the principal trade of the town. In 1618, James I reaffirmed Berkhamsted's borough status with a charter. Following surveys in 1607 and 1612 the Duchy of Cornwall enclosed 300 acres (121 ha) from the Common (now known as Coldharbour farm) despite local opposition led by Rev Thomas Newman. In 1639 the Duchy tried to enclose a further 400 acres (162 ha) of the Berkhamsted and Northchurch Commons, but was prevented from doing so by William Edlyn of Norcott. The castle's park, which had reached 1,252 acres (507 ha) by 1627, was broken up over the next two decades, shrinking to only 376 acres (152 ha), to the benefit of local farmers. In 1643, Berkhamsted was visited by a violent pestilential fever.

Born in Berkhamsted, Colonel Daniel Axtell (1622 – 19 October 1660), a Baptist and a grocer's apprentice, played a zealous and prominent part in the English Civil War, both in England and in the Cromwellian conquest of Ireland. He participated as a lieutenant colonel in Pride's Purge of the Long Parliament (December 1648), arguably the only military coup d'état in English history, and commanded the Parliamentary Guard at the trial of King Charles I at Westminster Hall in 1649. During Cromwell's Protectorate, he appropriated Berkhamsted Place. Shortly after the Restoration of the monarchy under Charles II, the unrepentant Axtell was hanged, drawn and quartered as a regicide. After the Restoration, the town lost its charter granted by James I and its borough status. The surveyor of Hertfordshire recommended that a new tenant and army officers were needed at Berkhamsted Place "to govern the people much seduced of late by new doctrine preacht unto them by Axtell and his colleagues." The population of the town in 1640 and in the 1690s was estimated at 1075 and 767, respectively. The town was a centre of religious nonconformity from the 17th century: over a quarter of the town were Dissenters in the second half of the century, and in 1700, there were 400 Baptists recorded as living in Berkhamsted. Three more shops are mentioned in the row next to the church, and the Parliamentary Survey of 1653 suggests that the area near the Market House was used for butchery.
