= Cow Roast =

Hamlet in Hertfordshire, England

Coordinates: 51.783°N 0.613°W

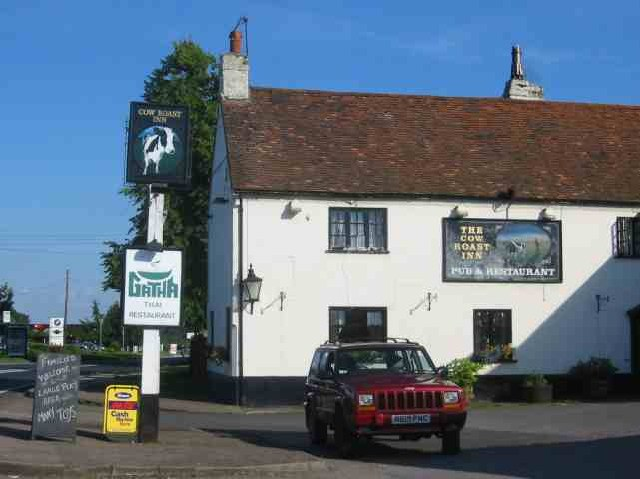
- The former Cow Roast Inn, Cow Roast

- Location within Hertfordshire
- OS grid reference: SP958103
- District: Dacorum
- Shire county: Hertfordshire
- Region: East
- Country: England
- Sovereign state: United Kingdom
- Post town: Tring
- Postcode district: HP23
- Dialling code: 01442
- Police: Hertfordshire
- Fire: Hertfordshire
- Ambulance: East of England
- UK Parliament: South West Hertfordshire

Cow Roast (sometimes written as Cowroast) is a hamlet within the civil parishes of Northchurch and Wigginton in Hertfordshire, England. It is between Tring and Berkhamsted, along the A4251, adjacent to the Grand Union Canal and the West Coast Main Line. Today it comprises a row of 20th-century houses and a marina, together with several older properties including a restaurant (which previously operated as a public house, until its closure in September 2017). There are three car dealerships and a petrol station beside the main road.

Cow Roast is located on the site of a Romano-British settlement, close to the route of Akeman Street.

== Origin of the name ==
The name Cow Roast is almost certainly a corruption of the name 'Cow Rest', indicating a place where there were pens and grazing for resting cattle en route to market. The hamlet lies on an ancient drovers' route which passes through the Chiltern Hills towards London.

== History ==
During the Iron Age, a Celtic tribe called the Catuvellauni occupied Hertfordshire. Their main settlement (or oppidum) was Verlamion on the River Ver (near present-day St Albans); other oppida in Hertfordshire included a settlement at Cow Roast, near the springs at the source of the River Bulbourne. Archaeological evidence suggests that this area was at one time a prominent location for the extraction, smelting and trade of bog iron in Iron Age Britain.

Cow Roast was also the site of a Romano-British settlement, which grew up close to the route of Akeman Street.

The Berkhamsted and District Archaeological Society began to conduct an excavation at Cow Roast in 1972. Over the next four years, digging took place in an orchard near the Cow Roast Inn, and for three years excavations were also conducted at the future site of the marina. The scope of the works later extended onto fields adjacent to the Cow Roast Inn. These excavations resulted in the discovery of various Roman artefacts, which led to the area subsequently being registered as an ancient monument, under the protection of Historic England, and designated as a Roman town.

The excavations at Cow Roast led to the discovery of a number of significant items. Smaller finds included a variety of crafted objects such as pottery, coins, tools and jewellery made from iron, bronze, stone, shale, glass and bone. Larger finds included fourteen well-shafts which, due to their significant number, suggest water usage on an industrial scale – likely for the purposes of iron production. Augmenting these discoveries, large amounts of iron slag and cinders were discovered at the marina site. Further discoveries included the remains of beam-slots and post-holes from wooden buildings; in addition to these, the remains of flint masonry walls were uncovered.

Across the area of the excavations, a number of different bones from a variety of animals were unearthed; the most commonly found bones were those of cows, with over forty discovered. This supports the theory that the site was probably a significant location on a drovers' route, via which cattle were taken to London to provide meat at the markets. Drovers are likely to have rested their cows overnight at this site before continuing their journeys; thus, the current name 'Cow Roast' is believed to have been derived from a corruption of the original term, 'Cow Rest'.

Cow Roast has been described by Dacorum Borough Council as, "One of the most important late Iron Age and Roman industrial landscapes in England."

Archaeological finds suggest that it was occupied as late as the 5th century, although the byway through the Chiltern Hills would have been an important transport conduit throughout the Roman occupation. Subsequently, it continued to be known as part of a drovers' route until the mid-19th century, with the area around the present-day Cow Roast settlement providing grazing for cattle. One mile north-west of Cow Roast, a road named 'Cow Lane' may once have comprised part of a wider network of drove routes, together with the hollow ways and common land near Ashridge, Aldbury and Pitstone.

Between 1762 and 1872, a toll road called the Sparrows Herne Turnpike Road passed through Cow Roast. The New Ground Gate tollhouse was situated near New Ground Farm.

Much of the present-day Cow Roast Inn restaurant buildings are likely to have been built around 1800 on the site of a previous coaching inn. In 1986, the Cow Roast Inn received Grade II Listed Building status. The Cow Roast Inn ceased trading as a pub in September 2017, but the premises were redeveloped and the venue reopened as a restaurant called 'The Artisan' in January 2024.

The section of the Grand Junction Canal which transects Cow Roast was constructed in 1799; in 1929, the waterway was renamed the Grand Union Canal.

During the construction of the Grand Junction Canal and locks, a bronze Romano-British Coolus helmet was discovered; in 1813, this was acquired for display in the British Museum.

Construction on the London and Birmingham Railway Line began in 1833; the section which passes through Cow Roast was opened in 1838. In 1948, following nationalisation of the railways, the route officially became known as the West Coast Main Line.

The New Ground pumping station was built and modified by the Chiltern Hills Spring Water Company between 1884 and 1891. Regular groundwater abstraction had ceased at the site by 2010 and it is now only used to provide emergency flood relief.

On 24 October 1944, a USAF B-17G aircraft crashed in a field at Cow Roast. Most of the aircrew survived, but the pilot, First lieutenant Don DeLisle, was sadly killed in the accident.

During the 1960s, there was an establishment called the Cherry Tree Cafe operating at Cow Roast; by 1983, the building had been converted into a private residence.

Old maps, photographs and documents indicate that Cow Roast Marina was built on farmland in the late 1970s. Renovations took place at the site in the 1990s, following a lengthy planning process.

The main Berkhamsted to Tring thoroughfare passed through Cow Roast until the A41 bypass opened in 1993.

== Sports and recreation ==
Berkhamsted and Hemel Hempstead Hockey Club has been based at Lockhart Field, behind the Cow Roast Inn, since 1957. The grounds are named after a prominent former player, captain of the First XI, club president and local building contractor, Donald E. Lockhart (b.1912 – d.1993).

During the 1970s and 1980s, Chipperfield Clarendon Cricket Club and the Middlesex Women's Cricket team played matches at Lockhart Field.

Hatch End Hawks lacrosse team was based there between 2012 and 2014.

Since June 2013, Lockhart Field has also been the home of Berkhamsted Rugby Union Football Club.

The sports fields at Cow Roast are regularly used by a number of local amateur football teams, including Maclay FC and Berkhamsted Raiders CFC.

Berkhamsted Bowmen Archery Club meets regularly at Lockhart Field.

Classes available on site include dance, drama and dog training.

The grounds are occasionally used for hot-air balloon launches, and for Caravan and Motorhome Club rallies.

Chesham Model Flying Club operates from a field beside Newground Road.

Berkhamsted School Rowing club also has a base on the Grand Union Canal which is accessible via Newground Road.

Northchurch Cricket Club is based nearby, at the playing fields on the north side of the A4251, close to the junction between Tring Road and Dudswell Lane.

There are numerous hiking, running, cycling, canoeing and boating routes throughout the locality, as well as a campsite in an orchard on Norcott Hill.

The Chiltern Way long-distance footpath passes through Cow Roast.

The local newspaper is the Hemel Hempstead Gazette & Express.

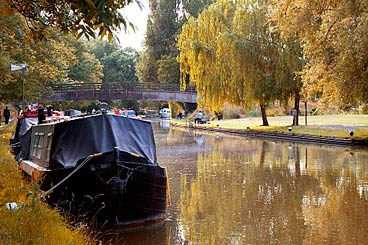
Cow Roast is situated on the A4251 road, the Grand Union Canal and the West Coast Main Line

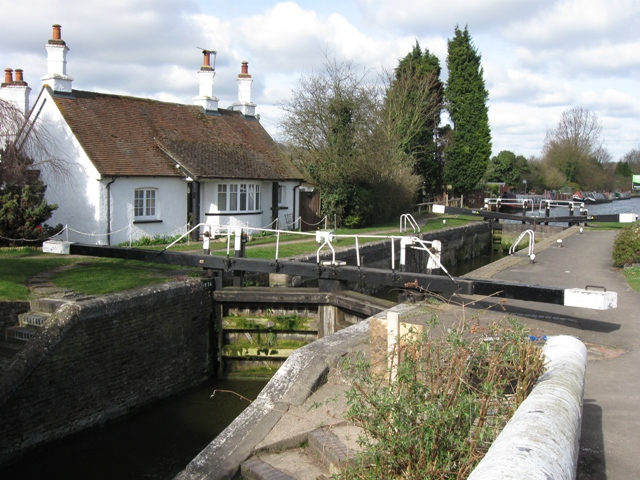
The Grand Union Canal locks at Cow Roast

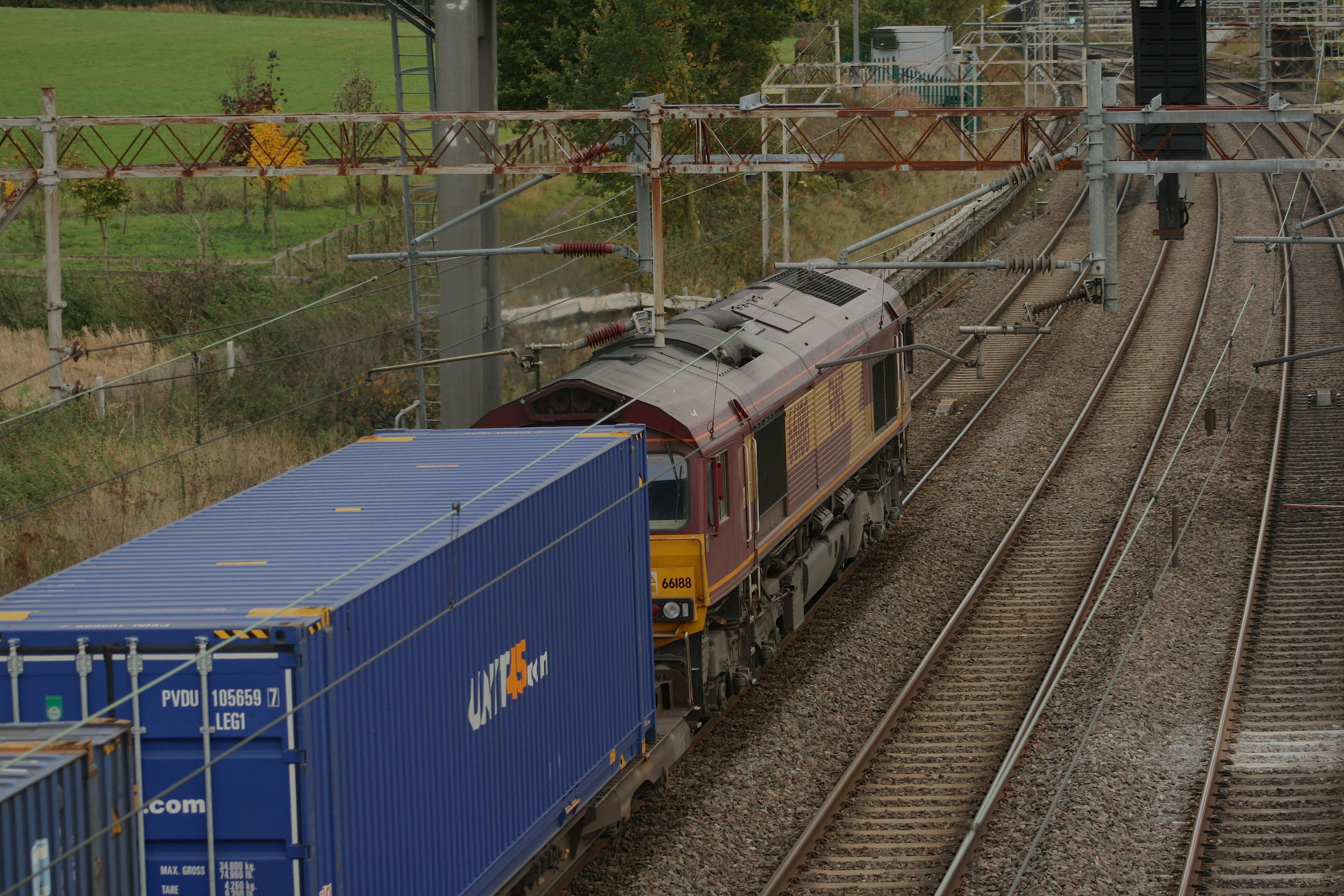
Diesel-hauled freight under the 25 kV wires on the West Coast Main Line at Cow Roast footbridge, near Tring

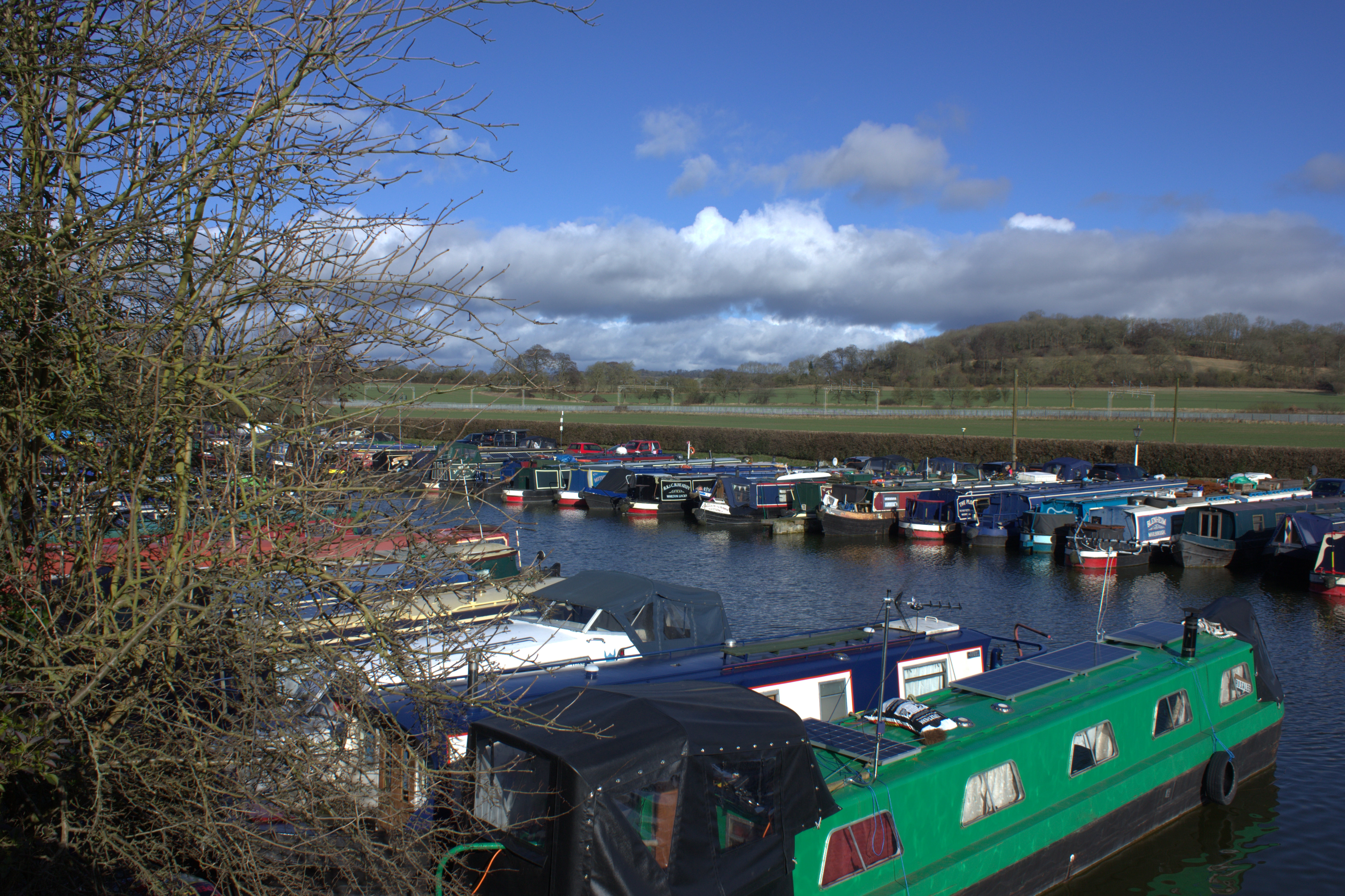
Cow Roast Marina

== Geography ==
Cow Roast is situated in South West Hertfordshire, England, straddling the border of the civil parishes of Wigginton and Northchurch, between the towns of Tring and Berkhamsted. It is served by the Arriva 500 and S500 bus routes, and by the Red Rose Travel bus route 501.

Cow Roast is linked with the neighbouring hamlet of Dudswell by Wharf Lane and by the Grand Union Canal.

The River Bulbourne is a chalk stream which runs in a south-easterly direction for 7 miles (11 km) from its source between Cow Roast and Dudswell, joining the River Gade at Two Waters in Apsley.
