= River Bulbourne =

River in Hertfordshire, England

Bulbourne
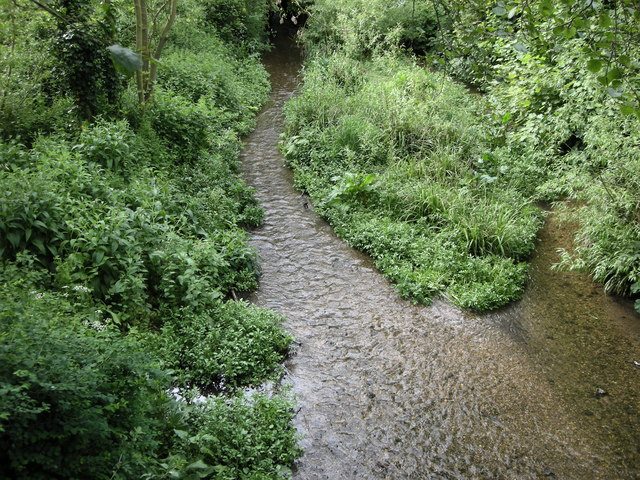
- River Bulbourne in Berkhamsted (reduced by the Grand Union canal which is a couple of metres away)

Location
- Country: United Kingdom

Physical characteristics
- Source
  - location: Cow Roast/ Dudswell, Northchurch
  - coordinates: 51.778°N 0.601°W
  - elevation: 120 m (390 ft)
- Mouth
  - location: Two Waters Apsley, Hemel Hempstead
  - coordinates: 51.739°N 0.471°W
  - elevation: 90 m (300 ft)
- Length: 11 km (6.8 mi)

The River Bulbourne is a small river in Dacorum, Hertfordshire, England. The word bourne derives from the Anglo-Saxon word for a stream. It is an unnavigable tributary of the River Gade, which flows into the River Colne, which in turn is a tributary of the River Thames. The Bulbourne is an example of a chalk stream, which is a watercourse that flows from chalk-fed groundwater. Chalk streams are a very rare habitat globally, with more than 85% of all the 210 chalk streams in the world found in England. The river is reduced in size, due to human activity, the main one being the building of the London to Birmingham Grand Union Canal through the narrow valley which takes most of the river's water.

== Geography ==
The Bulbourne flows in the Chiltern Hills, part of a system of chalk downlands throughout eastern and southern England, which formed between 84 and 100 million years ago in the Cretaceous Period when the area was a chalk-depositing marine environment. The valley is at the southernmost limit of the Pleistocene glaciation ice erosion of the Chiltern scarp, giving it a smooth, rounded appearance. Around Berkhamsted the valley sides rise 300 ft. It is situated on the northern rim of the larger syncline or down-folding of rocks called the London Basin. The underlying geology is chalk, which outcrops in places along the east side of the valley. The subsoil is predominantly a stiff reddish clay-with-flints; in the valley itself the chalk is overlain with alluvium.

== Course ==
The river runs in a south-easterly direction from between Cow Roast and Dudswell in Northchurch, through Berkhamsted, Bourne End and Boxmoor, to where it joins the River Gade at Two Waters in Apsley near Hemel Hempstead. The current total length of the river is 7 miles (11 km); from its source to its mouth it falls 30 metres (98 ft).

== Human activity ==
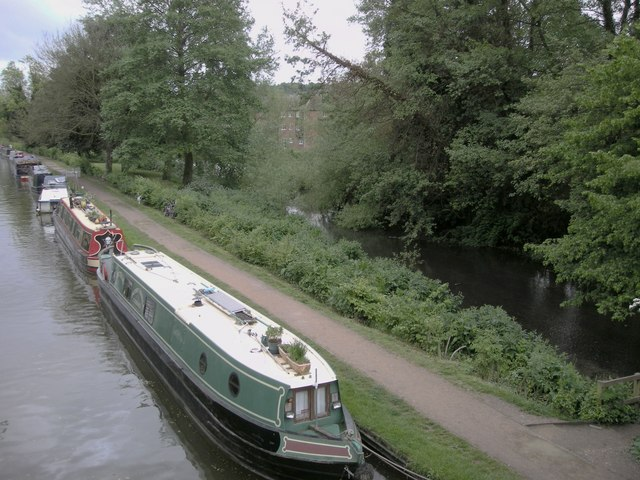
The unnavigable River Bulbourne to the right of the Grand Union Canal's towpath at Berkhamsted

The River Bulbourne was historically rich in eels and other fish, fast-moving and prone to frequent localised flooding; this has led it to being classified as a statutory main river downstream from Dudswell. Over the years, human activity has had a significant effect on the river. Originally, the source of the Bulbourne was near the hamlet of Bulbourne, near Tring (which would make the river 2.9 miles (4.7 km) longer); in 1700 the source was said to be Parkhill Farm, near Pendley Manor (making the river 0.5 miles (0.80 km) shorter). Settlement in the valley began prior to the Late Iron Age period. The upper Bulbourne Valley was rich in timber and iron ore in the form of bog iron . In the late Iron Age, a four-square-mile (ten-square-kilometre) area around Northchurch was a major iron production centre (considered to be one of the most important late Iron Age and Roman industrial areas in England). Water was drawn from 14 well shafts close to the river at Cow Roast, where a Roman town grew up between the river and the Roman- engineered Akeman Street (which had been a pre-existing route from St Albans (Verulamium) to Cirencester (Corinium)) Iron production ceased at the end of the Roman period. There were Roman villas in Northchurch, Berkhamsted and Boxmoor.

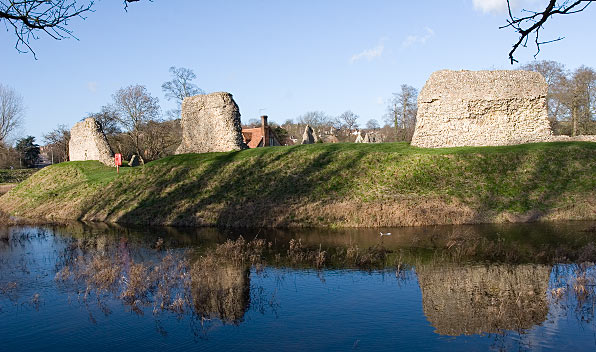
The Bulbourne provided water for the two or three moats around the important medieval Berkhamsted Castle, as well as a further defensive barrier of a marsh.

Early Anglo-Saxon settlements arose in Northchurch and Berkhamsted. In the Medieval period, the Bulbourne powered two watermills in Berkhamsted (Upper and Lower - recorded in 1086) and another in Bourne End. It also fed the three moats of the large Norman (Motte and Bailey) Berkhamsted Castle, that stands close to the centre of the town. The river created a marsh environment (at times referred to as an 'unhealthy swamp') in the centre of the valley, which added to the defences of the castle.

During the Industrial Age in 1797, the Grand Union Canal was dug alongside the entire length of the river, and the Bulbourne became the main source of water for the canal, which was the main link between London and the coalfields of the Midlands. This manmade waterway was the only one to be built across the Chilterns Hills. Ensuring a constant supply of water in a region of permeable chalk was an engineering challenge which required the building of reservoirs, pumps and boreholes.

After the Pre-Roman Road and the canal, the next major transport route to carve its way along the Bulbourne valley was Sparrows Herne Turnpike founded in 1762, followed by the London to Birmingham railway, in 1834.

In 1883, the Berkhamsted Times congratulated a Mr Bedford on having converted the remaining "dirty ditches and offensive marshes" into watercress beds. Thus the River Bulbourne was reduced by centuries of increased drinking needs, dredging, milling and agriculture, as well as by the London to Birmingham Canal.

In October 2011, concerns were raised about local water levels when the River Bulbourne dried up. Local commentators blamed increased water consumption brought about by the number of new property developments in Berkhamsted, although the Environment Agency and the Veolia water company claimed it was due to a low water table, caused by lack of rainfall.

== Tributaries ==
The Bourne Gutter is a short 400 yards (370 m) tributary of the Bulbourne, rising between Berkhamsted and Bourne End. In very wet years it runs from springs nearly three miles further up a side valley, near Hockeridge Bottom. According to local legend it is a "Woe Water", said to only flow at a time of national emergency.

Another small tributary was 60 feet (20 yd) at St Johns Well Lane (in Berkhamsted); it dried up in the 1930s due to increased local water-pumping needs. From at least the Middle Ages the 'holy well' there had been Berkhamsted's principal source of drinking water.

== Part restoration ==
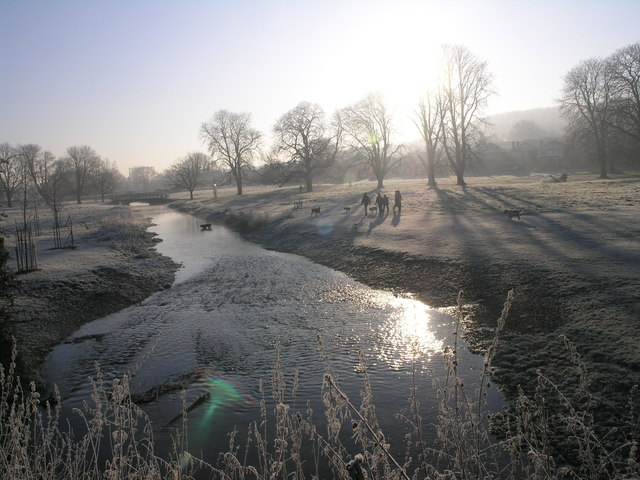
River Bulbourne just above its confluence with the River Gade at Boxmoor near Hemel Hempstead. Shown before restoration

The Bulbourne flows through Boxmoor, and it was on this stretch that a major river restoration project was undertaken in January 2017. Working in conjunction with the Environment Agency, the Box Moor Trust restored a kilometre stretch of the river; the river in this location had been heavily modified in the past, and as a result was overly deep, straight and wide. As such, the restoration work was carried out in order to return the river to a more natural state. The bulk of this work was carried out in January 2017, whilst the creation of ephemeral ponds took place in November, 2017. The ‘Bringing Back the Bulbourne’ project scooped the ‘best medium scale’ award at The Wild Trout Trust Conservation Awards. The natural meander of this section of the chalk stream was restored (a globally rare habitat), creating new habitats for plants and wildlife. Removing a weir has allowed fish to move along the river, while cutting back trees has allowed more light to reach the river.

== Sources ==
- Hastie, Scot (1996). A Hertfordshire Valley. Kings Langley, UK: Alpine Press. ISBN 0-952863103.
- Hastie, Scot (1999). Berkhamsted, an Illustrated History. Kings Langley, UK: Alpine Press. ISBN 0-9528631-1-1.
- Thompson, Isobel; Bryant, Stewart (2005). Extensive Urban Surveys: Berkhamsted, Revision 2005 (PDF) (Report). Historic Environment Unit, Hertfordshire County Council.
