= Percy Birtchnell =

British historian (1910–1986)

- Percy Birtchnell in 1985
- Born: 8 April 1910; Berkhamsted, Hertfordshire, England
- Died: 12 March 1986 (aged 75)
- Occupation: Historian
- Writing career
- Pen name: Beorcham
- Language: English
- Period: 20th Century
- Genre: Local history
- Notable works: A History of Berkhamsted; Bygone Berkhamsted

Percy Birtchnell (8 April 1910 – 12 March 1986) was a British writer and historian. He was especially noted for his writing about the history of his home town of Berkhamsted in West Hertfordshire. His publications include A History of Berkhamsted and Bygone Berkhamsted, both published by Clunberry.

== Life and career ==
Birtchnell was born in Highfield Road, Berkhamsted in Hertfordshire in 1910.

After working as a typesetter at Cooper's printing works (later the Clunbury Press), he opened a menswear shop in the parade of shops next to the newly built Rex Cinema. He was one of the founders of the Berkhamsted & District Local History Society in 1950. His menswear shop later moved west along the High Street to new premises.

From an early age, Birtchnell developed an interest in history, especially local history, and began writing articles for local papers when he was aged fifteen. He had articles published in the Berkhamsted Gazette and the Watford Observer. He also contributed historical articles to the Berkhamsted Review, a local parish magazine, writing under the pen name Beorcham, which was an archaic name for Berkhamsted.

== Death and legacy ==
Percy Birtchnell died from a heart attack on 12 March 1986. Birtchnell's menswear shop continued to trade after his death and closed in 2010. Following structural damage, the building collapsed unexpectedly in January 2011 and was demolished.

When Augustus Smith Middle School merged with Thomas Bourne CofE Middle School in 1990 one proposed name for the new school was Percy Birtchnell Middle School, before the name Thomas Coram Middle School was eventually selected.

== Bibliography ==
- Birtchnell, Percy (1960). A Short History of Berkhamsted. Privately printed. OCLC 12987877.
- Birtchnell, Percy (1975). Bygone Berkhamsted. ISBN 978-0-900804-13-7.

== See also ==
- History of Hertfordshire
- Dacorum Heritage
- Robert Clutterbuck
