= Bourne End, Hertfordshire =

Village in Hertfordshire, England

Coordinates: 51.74°N 00.52°W

Bourne End
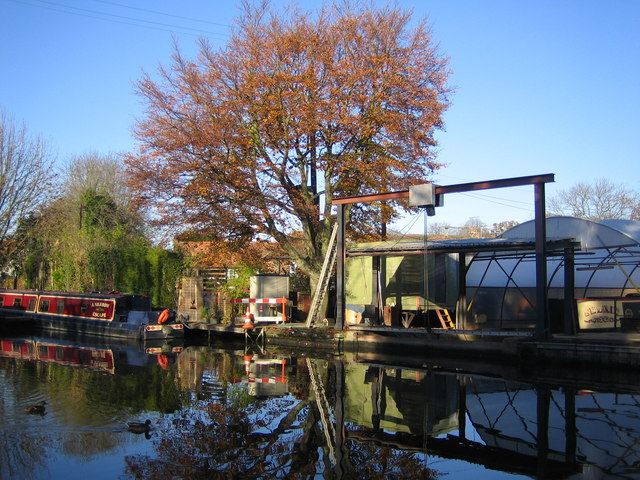
- Grand Union Canal

- Location within Hertfordshire
- OS grid reference: TL0206
- District: Dacorum
- Shire county: Hertfordshire
- Region: East
- Country: England
- Sovereign state: United Kingdom
- Post town: HEMEL HEMPSTEAD
- Postcode district: HP1
- Dialling code: 01442
- Police: Hertfordshire
- Fire: Hertfordshire
- Ambulance: East of England

Bourne End is a village in Hertfordshire, England. It is situated on the ancient Roman Akeman Street between Berkhamsted and Hemel Hempstead, on the former A41 London-Liverpool Trunk Route, on the Grand Union Canal that runs between London and Birmingham and at the confluence of the Chiltern chalk stream, the Bourne Gutter and the River Bulbourne. It is in the Dacorum Ward of Bovingdon, Flaunden and Chipperfield.

== History ==
Bourne End formerly lay within the extended parish of Northchurch (Berkhamsted St. Mary). It was then known as the hamlet of Broadway. In 1909 the south-eastern part of Northchurch was separated into a new parish consisting of the hamlets of Sunnyside and Broadway. Bourne End/Broadway became a separate parish in 1915.

Bourne End derives its name as it lies at the end of the Bourne Gutter, an irregularly flowing stream, at its confluence with the River Bulbourne. According to local tradition the Bourne Gutter is a Woe Water that only flows at times of tragedy. Recorded instances include during 1665 at the time of the Great Plague, in 1914 at the outbreak of the World War I and in 1956 during the Suez Crisis. The Hemel Hempstead Gazette has also run stories on the Gutter flowing in early 1982 as Argentinian Forces invaded the Falkland Islands, in early October 1987 days before the Great Storm of 1987 that devastated woodlands throughout southern England, and in 2003 as British troops joined the International invasion of Iraq. It also began flowing in March 2020, during the early stages of the COVID-19 pandemic within the UK, and throughout Winter 2020 into Spring 2021.

Bourne End was the scene of the rail disaster on the West Coast Main Line on 30 September 1945 when an express train was derailed with many fatalities.

== Church of Saint John the Evangelist ==
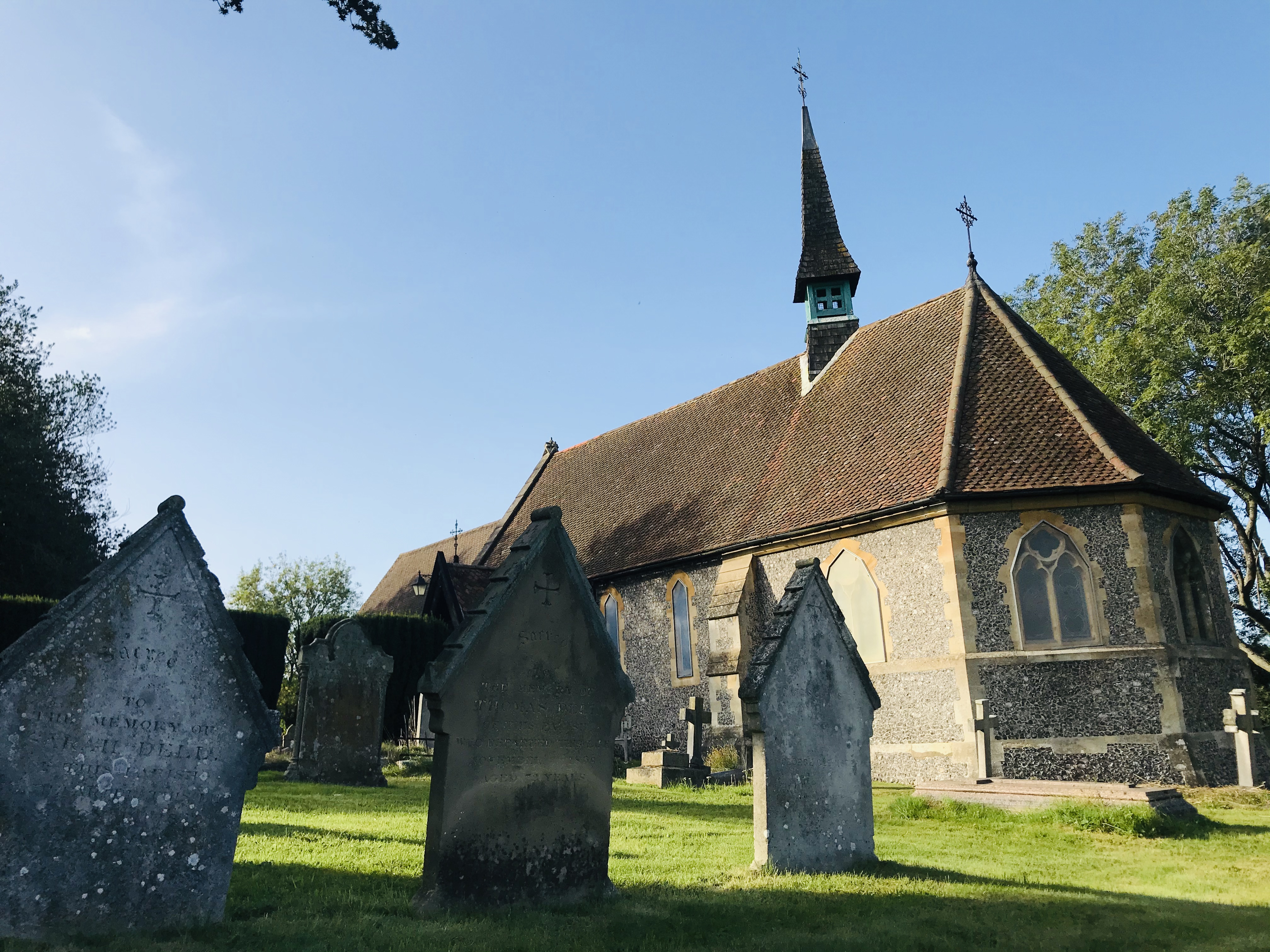
Church of Saint John the Evangelist Bourne End

In the 1850s the rector Cannon Sir John Hobart Culme Seymour decided to found a chapel of ease for St Mary's Northchurch. The architect George Gilbert Scott was commissioned to design the new church and construction was funded by Thomas Halsey of The Hall, Berkhamsted. An additional donation was made by the Prince of Wales on behalf of the landowner, the Duchy of Cornwall.

The Church of St. John The Evangelist was completed in 1854. It is a small flint church in the Gothic Revival style with a steep pitched roofs and decorative red tiles topped with a small wooden spire, a timber-framed porch and a semicircular apse at the east end. The six stained glass windows in the apse are early works by Alfred Bell. In 1889-1891 the chancel was altered to add a richly carved altar and a Gothic reredos depicting the Resurrection, and the domed apse ceiling was decorated with a painted scene of Dante's vision of Heaven, painted by David Bell. In 2001 four of the Alfred Bell stained glass windows were stolen. These have since been replaced by replica windows, installed in 2003.
