= Dacorum Heritage =

English history advocacy group

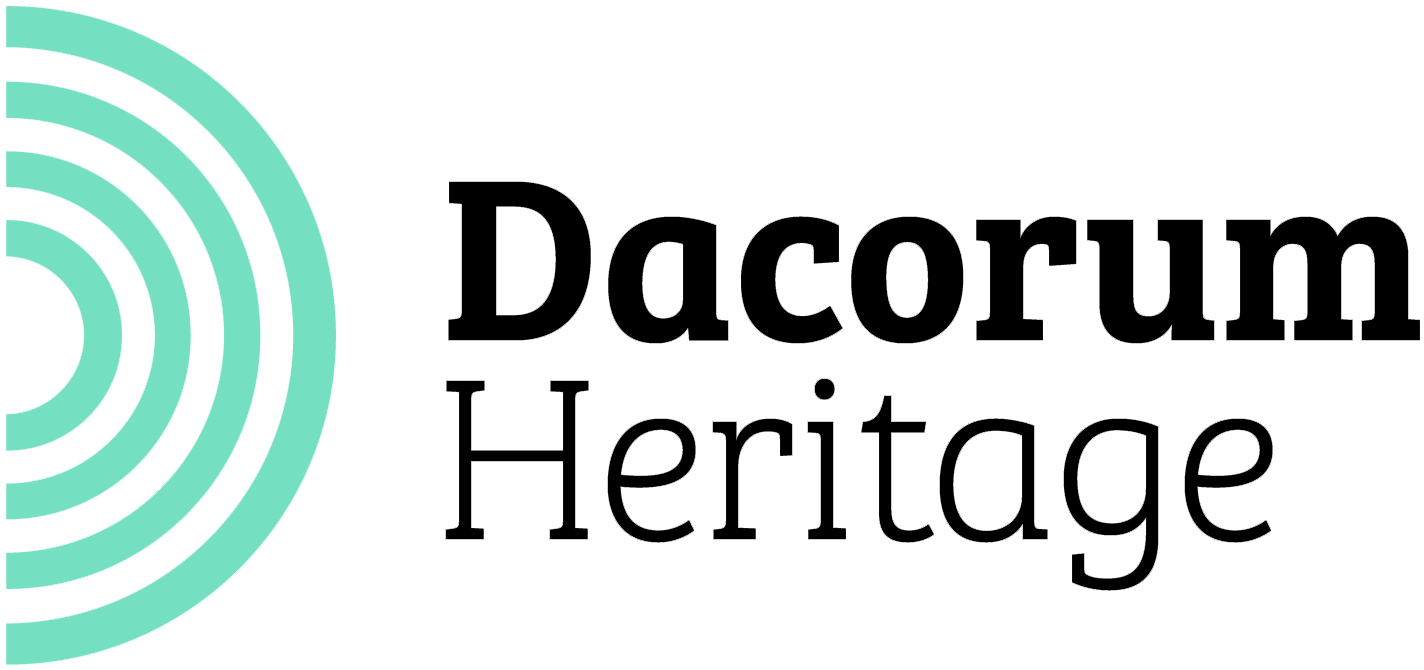
- Abbreviation: DH
- Predecessor: The Dacorum Museum Advisory Committee (DMAC)
- Formation: 1979 (as DMAC); 1993 (as the DHT)
- Type: Charity
- Registration no.: 1026161
- Purpose: To promote and record the heritage of Dacorum
- Headquarters: The old Fire Station, Berkhamsted, Hertfordshire, UK
- Region served: Dacorum, England
- Fields: Heritage
- Website: www.dacorumheritage.org.uk

Dacorum Heritage (DH) is a local history advocacy group in the United Kingdom. It collects and records the history of the Borough of Dacorum, Hertfordshire, in the south of England, and aims to encourage the appreciation of the heritage of Dacorum.

== History ==
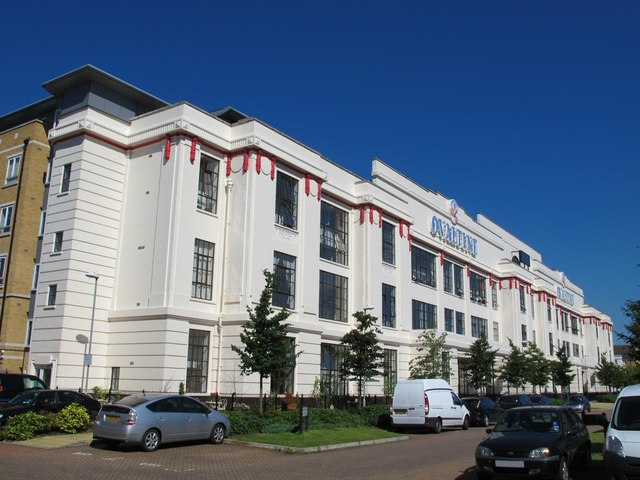
The collection includes items recovered from the former Ovaltine factory at Kings Langley

In 1979, the Dacorum Museum Advisory Committee (DMAC) was formed to advise Dacorum District Council on heritage matters. The Dacorum Heritage Trust was founded in September 1993, and went on to establish an artefact collection and archive in an old fire station building behind Berkhamsted Civic Centre in 1994.

In 2014, Dacorum Heritage took on responsibility for the paper archive of the local newspaper, the Hemel Hempstead Gazette & Express. The charity has also been involved in the preservation of a set of rare pre-reformation religious wall paintings which were uncovered inside a 15th-century cottage at 130–136 Piccotts End. Dacorum Heritage launched an appeal in 2014 to raise money to buy the row of cottages.

In 2017, Dacorum Heritage proposed that The Bury, a Grade II* listed house in Hemel Hempstead, should be converted into a museum and art gallery. A bid to the National Lottery Heritage Fund in relation to The Bury was unsuccessful and, as of December 2023, Dacorum Heritage was considering a range of options for financing and delivering a new heritage centre for the area.

In 2025, Dacorum Heritage published an illustrated book entitled "A Wander through Ovaltine" which documented the history of the former Ovaltine factory at Kings Langley and those items in its collection that were recovered from the factory when it closed.

== Collections ==
Although Dacorum Heritage is an Arts Council England Accredited Museum, it lacks a permanent public display space and operates as a museum store. Its collection is held in Berkhamsted and can only be visited by appointment. The museum store holds over 130,000 objects relating to the history of the local towns of Berkhamsted, Bovingdon, Chipperfield, Flamstead, Hemel Hempstead, Kings Langley, Markyate and Tring.

Archaeological artefacts held by Dacorum Heritage include flint tools from the Paleolithic period, fragments from Roman villas at Boxmoor, Northchurch and Gadebridge Park; a Romano-British woman's skeleton excavated at Cow Roast, and artefacts from Kings Langley Palace. Also within Dacorum Heritage's holdings is a collection of prints and engravings by the Hemel Hempstead artist Lefevre James Cranstone.

Dacorum Heritage also holds historical exhibitions in local libraries, and publishes journals on local heritage.

== See also ==
- History of Hertfordshire
- List of lost settlements in Hertfordshire
- Category:Listed buildings in Hertfordshire
