= Lefevre James Cranstone =

English painter (1822–1893)

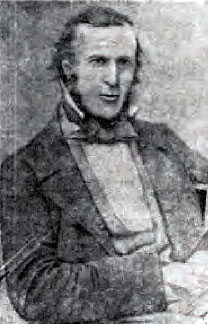
- Photograph of Lefevre James Cranstone, c.1859
- Born: 6 March 1822; Hemel Hempstead, UK
- Died: 22 June 1893 (aged 71); Brisbane, Australia
- Resting place: Toowong Cemetery, Brisbane
- Education: Sass School of Art; Royal Academy School
- Known for: Landscape paintings and sketches
- Movement: Genre art
- Spouse: Lillia Messenger

Lefevre James Cranstone (6 March 1822 – 22 June 1893) was an English artist known for his watercolor genre-style landscapes and oil paintings. He visited the United States, where many of his works are displayed, and later moved to Australia.

== Early life ==
Cranstone was the second of thirteen children born in Hemel Hempstead, England to Joseph Jr. and Maria Lefevre Cranstone. In 1838 he enrolled in Henry Sass's School of Art in London and at age 18 was received as a probationer into the Royal Academy School on 21 April 1840. Following his formal training he exhibited a number of oil paintings in the annual exhibitions of the Royal Society of British Artists in Suffolk Street and at the Royal Academy. In addition to his watercolor and oil paintings, during his lifetime Cranstone also produced etchings and pen and ink and chalk drawings. He was also an art teacher in his wife Lillia's boarding school.

== Works ==
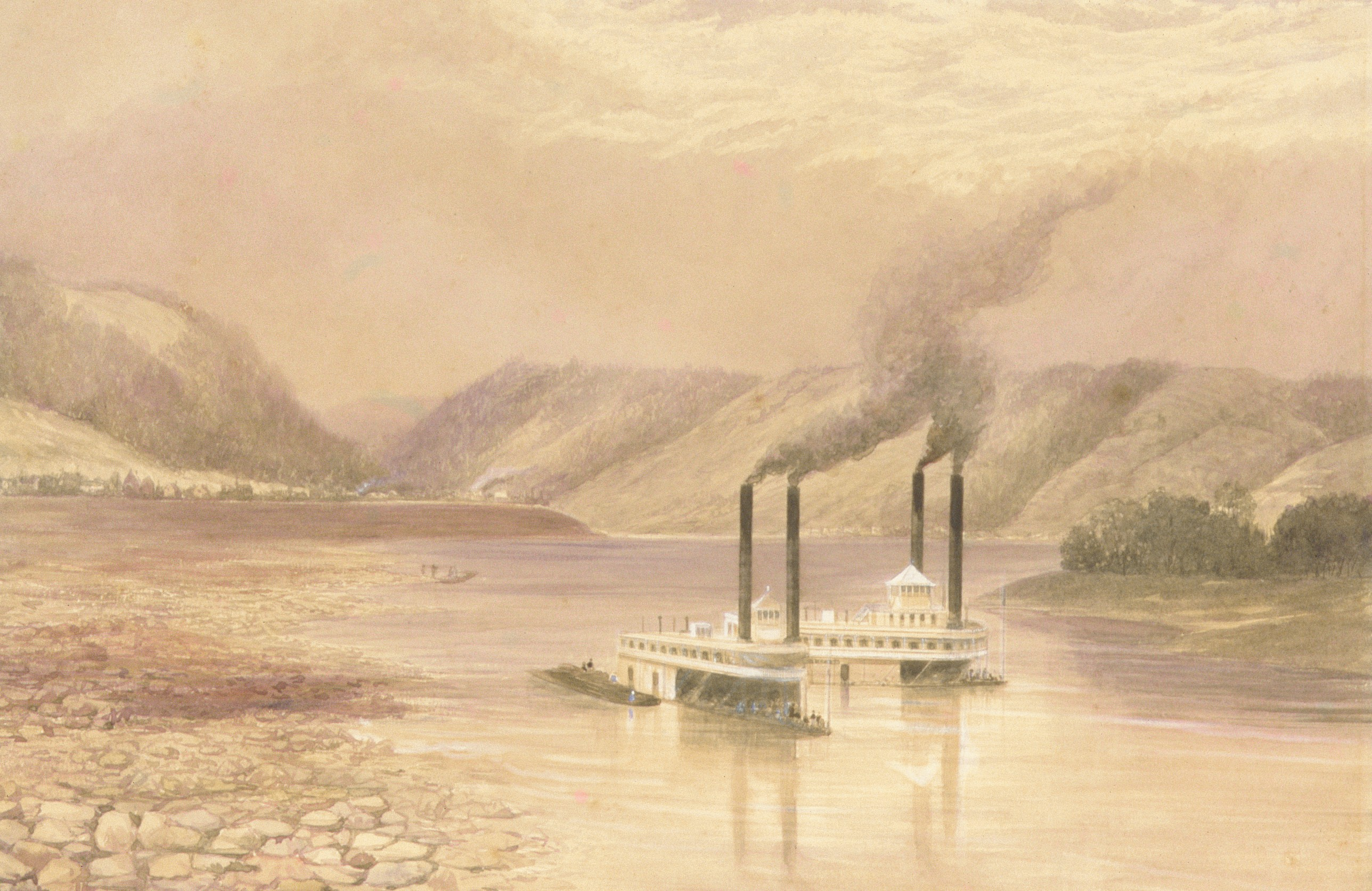
The Ohio River near Wheeling, West Virginia – watercolour, 1859–60 (Metropolitan Museum of Art)

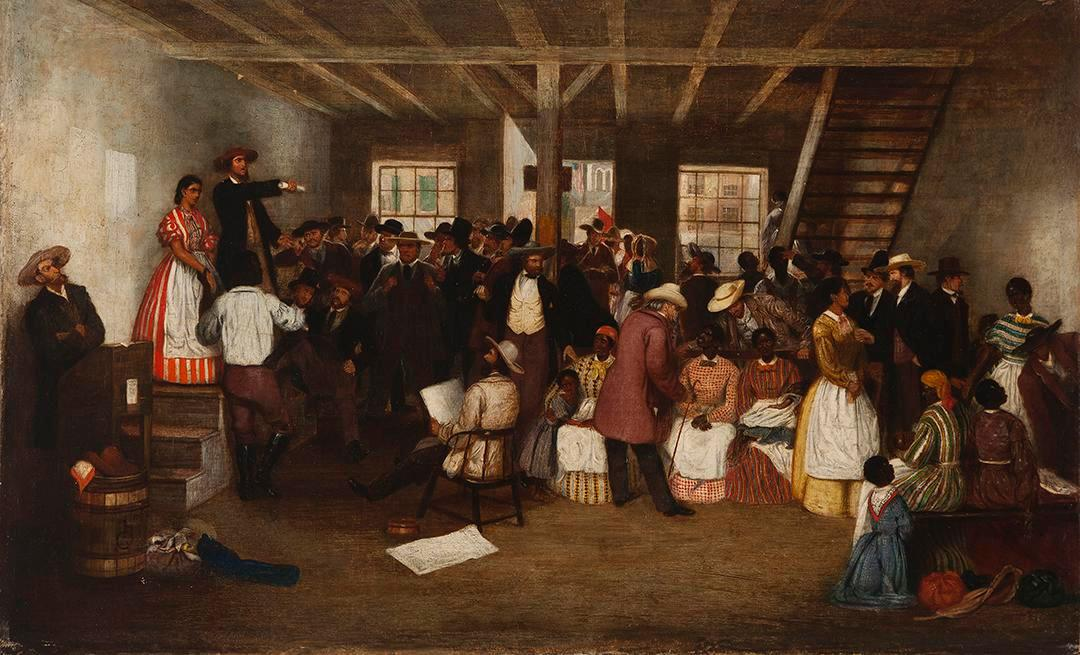
Slave Auction, Virginia – oil on canvas, 1862 (Virginia Museum of History & Culture)

Despite exhibiting at prestigious institutions such as the Royal Academy, Cranstone did not achieve popular recognition in Britain, and he is best known for his prolific work in America. For a ten-month period in 1859 and 1860 Cranstone, with his younger brother Alfred, visited cousins in Virginia and Indiana. During this trip he prepared almost 300 pen and ink with wash sketches documenting both the rural and urban areas of antebellum America which they visited. Works include paintings of the Ohio River at Wheeling, West Virginia, the White House in Washington DC and the Courthouse in Colonial Williamsburg.

Sketches he made during his American visit became available for sale in 1928 and are in the collections of the Lilly Library at Indiana University in Bloomington. In 1933 a collection of 98 larger watercolor versions of a representative number of the sketches were sold at auction. One of these was the oil painting, Slave Auction, Virginia, which hangs in the Virginia Museum of History & Culture in Richmond, Virginia. Donald L. Smith's biography of Cranstone contains a facsimile of this painting along with a letter dated 29 December 1860, that Cranstone wrote to the Hemel Hempstead Gazette, stating his views on the election of Abraham Lincoln as President of the United States, denouncing the brutality of slavery and describing in detail the horrors of a slave auction in Richmond, Virginia.

Cranstone's paintings are in the art collections of the White House; the Metropolitan Museum of Art; the Museum of Fine Arts, Boston; the Virginia Historical Society; the Virginia Museum of Fine Arts; the Colonial Williamsburg Foundation; the Oglebay Institute Mansion Museum in Wheeling, West Virginia; Dacorum Heritage in Berkhamsted, England; and other institutions and private collections. An art collection he prepared in Australia, along with a volume of illustrated poetry verse brought with him from England, are at the John Oxley Library in Brisbane.

== Later life ==
On 19 July 1882 Cranstone's wife of 27 years, Lillia, died aged 59. She was buried at Heath Lane Cemetery in Hemel Hempstead. Lillia had been running a school in the White House on the Marlowes in Hemel, which closed after her death.

Lillia's death promoted Cranstone to seek a new life in Australia. His eldest son, William, had recently qualified as a medical doctor, and shortly after William married, the Cranstone Family boarded a ship to Australia on 21 October 1882 – Lefevre James Cranstone, his children Beatrice Lillia (17) and Frederic George (23), William and his new wife, Ellen Kent. They disembarked at Sydney Harbour in New South Wales on 18 January 1883. From the day they arrived, Lefevre James Cranstone began to make sketches of the local land and seascapes. The Cranstones moved to the small town of Clermont in Queensland, where William took up the post of Chief Surgeon at the Peak Downs Hospital. While living there, Lefevre James produced a number of pen-and-ink drawings of the landscape around Wolfang, Retro and Emu Park.

In 1889, Cranstone moved with Beatrice to Brisbane, where he resided at Clydebank Cottage in North Quay, Brisbane. He continued drawing local subjects up to his death. Lefevre James Cranstone died on 22 June 1893, and was buried on the same day at Toowong Cemetery in Brisbane. The inscription on his headstone renders his name incorrectly as "Le Fevre".
