= Herald Express =

Herald Express may refer to:

- Los Angeles Herald-Express, California, US, 1931–1962
- Torquay Herald Express, Torquay, UK, 1925–present
- Herald Express, a free newspaper now merged into the Hemel Hempstead Gazette & Express, Hemel Hempstead, UK
