= Dudswell =

Dudswell may refer to:

- Dudswell, Quebec, a settlement in Le Haut-Saint-François Regional County Municipality, Canada
- Dudswell, Hertfordshire, a hamlet in Hertfordshire, England
