= Dudswell, Hertfordshire =

Hamlet in Hertfordshire, England

Coordinates: 51.777°N 0.601°W

Dudswell is a hamlet in South West Hertfordshire, England, between the towns of Tring and Berkhamsted. It is 2 miles (3.2 km) north-west of Berkhamsted, just off the A4251. It is close to the Grand Union Canal and also the Northchurch tunnel on the West Coast Main Line. It is in the civil parish of Northchurch.

Dudswell is linked with the neighbouring hamlet of Cow Roast by Wharf Lane and by the Grand Union Canal.

The River Bulbourne is a chalk stream which runs in a south-easterly direction for 7 miles (11km) from its source between Cow Roast and Dudswell, joining the River Gade at Two Waters in Apsley.

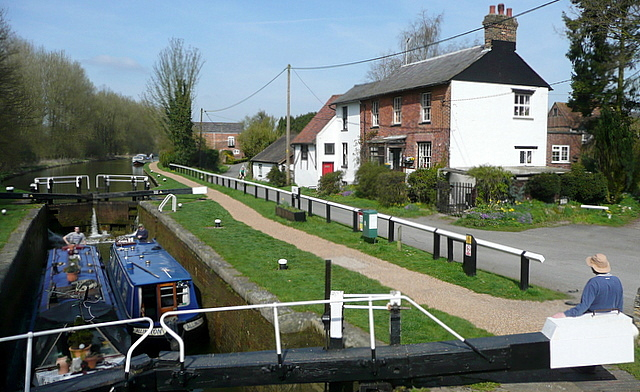
Dudswell Lock

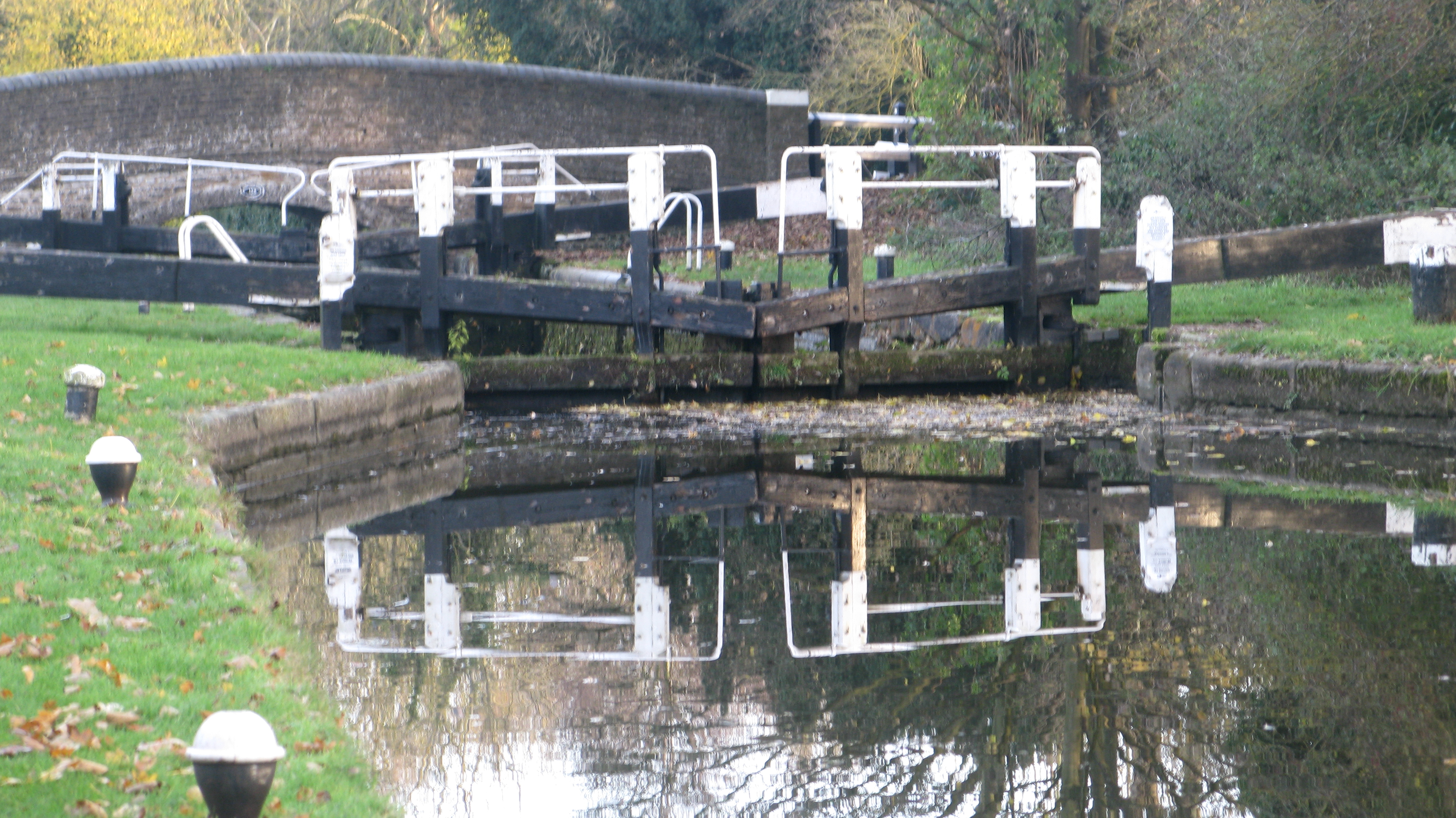
Lock No. 48
