= Boxmoor Roman Villa =

Coordinates: 51.740328°N 0.498093°W

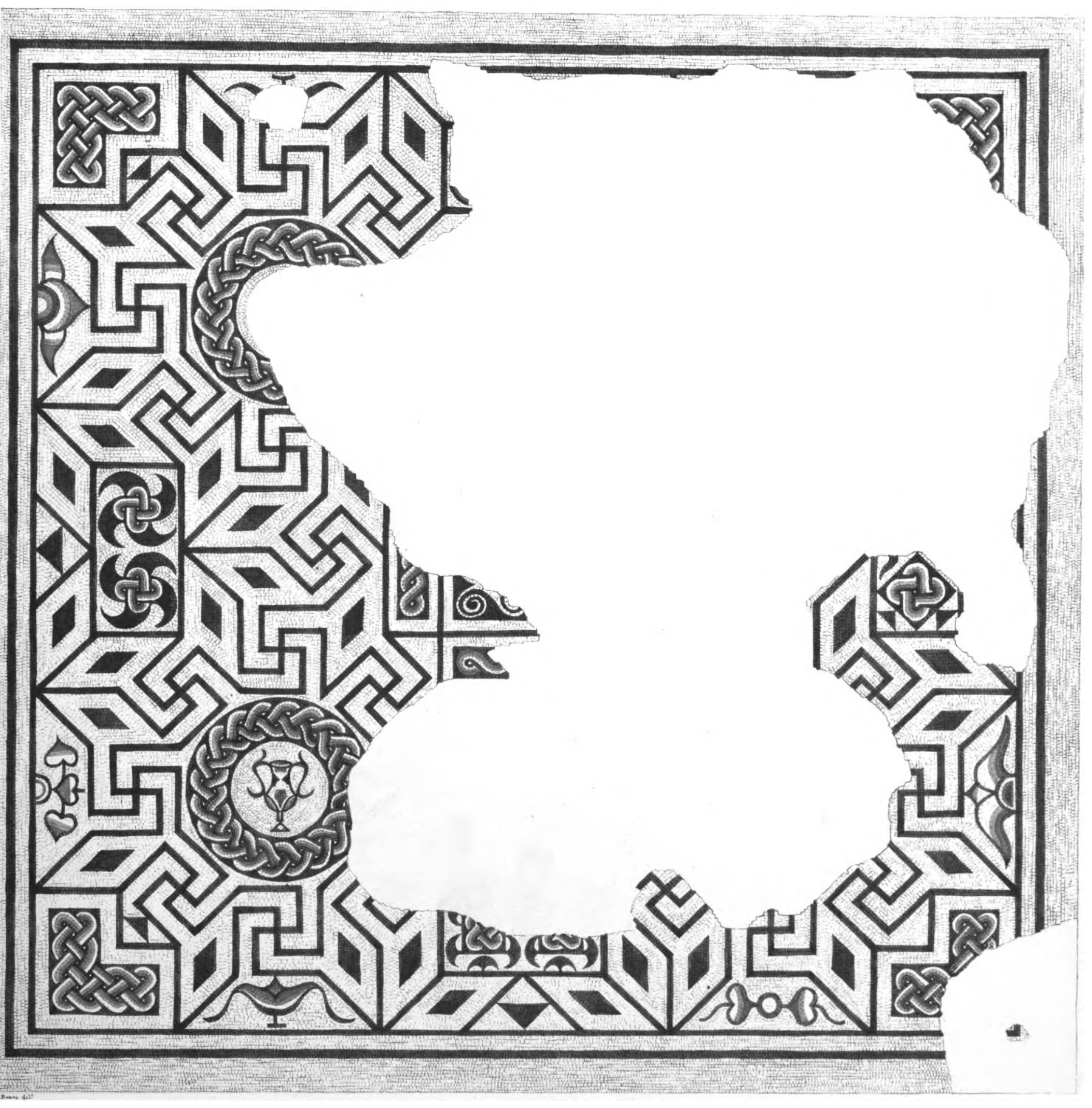
Mosaic from Boxmoor Villa

Boxmoor Roman Villa is a ruined Roman Villa at Boxmoor, Hemel Hempstead, Hertfordshire. The remains have been excavated, but they are now buried. The Roman villa was occupied from the first century AD up to the Fourth century.

First remains of a Roman villa were already excavated in 1837. A plan, the finds and a drawing of a mosaic found were published. Further and full excavations were done in 1969 up to 1970 as a school was built on the site of the Roman villa.

The excavations uncovered five building phases of a Roman villa. The earliest remains are a timber building dating to the first century AD. Around AD 150 the timber house was replaced by a stone building, not exactly on the same spot, but slightly further north. The new Villa consisted of a range of rooms with a veranda on the west side. Several rooms had hypocaust heating. Mosaics were found. and wall paintings. The villa was abandoned in the fourth century AD.

== Conservation ==
Some finds are held by Dacorum Heritage.
