= Gadebridge Park Roman Villa =

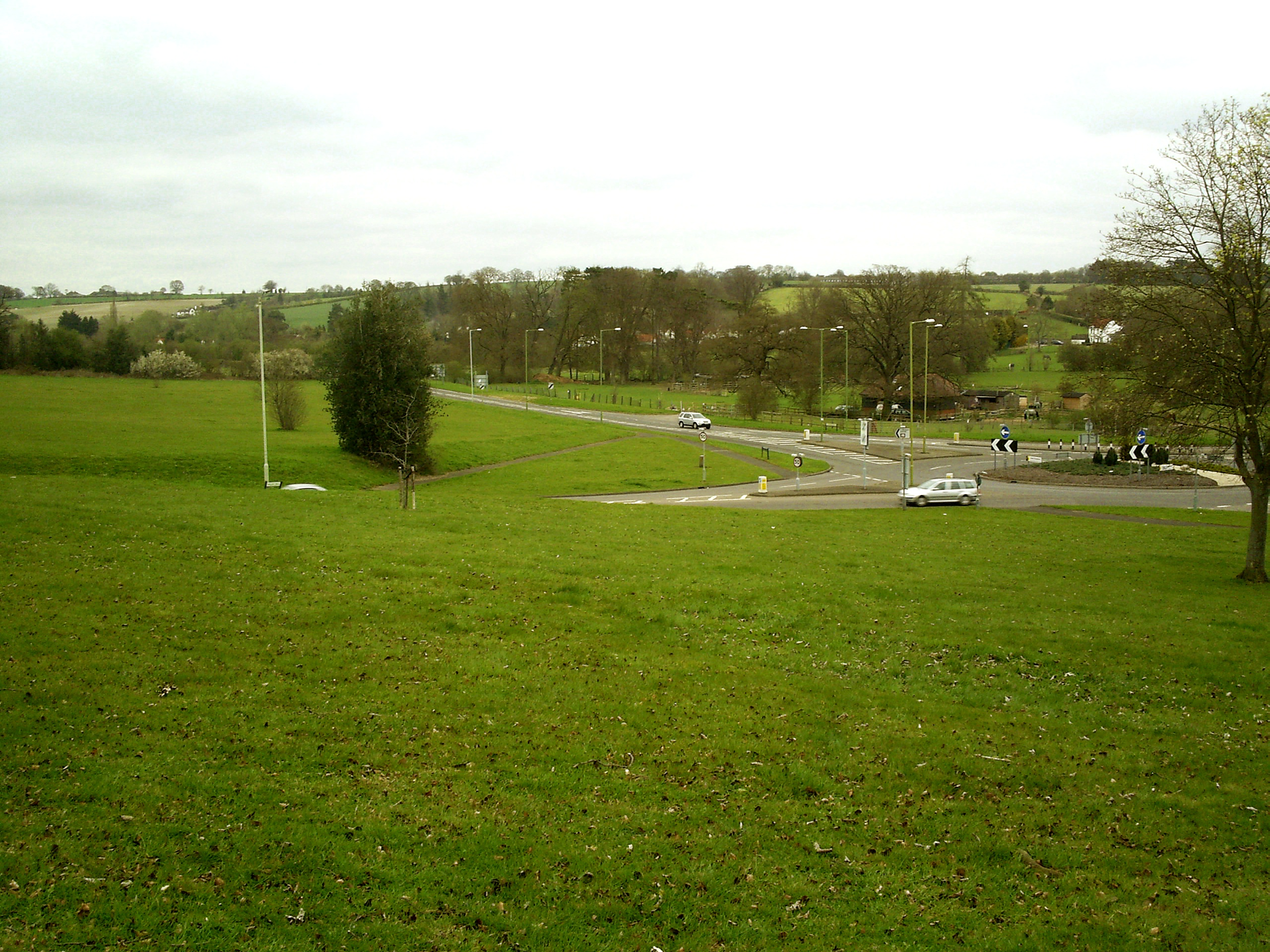
- Site of Gadebridge Roman Villa

- Location within Hertfordshire

General information
- Architectural style: classical
- Location: Hemel Hempstead grid reference TL049087, United Kingdom
- Coordinates: 51.7672°N 0.4811°W
- Construction started: 1st century
- Demolished: c. 350

Gadebridge Roman Villa, alternatively known as Gadebridge Park Roman Villa, is a ruined Roman villa in Hemel Hempstead, Hertfordshire, England.

== Excavation ==
A chance discovery in 1962, it was excavated in 1963-68 under the direction of David S. Neal. A second excavation took place in 2000, also under the direction of Dr Neal.

== History ==
The site may have begun as a pre Roman farm, but after the Roman invasion of AD 43 its proximity to the Roman city of Verulamium seems to have precipitated its development into a sort of spa and resort. From the Antonine Period, c. 138 AD, stone buildings were added, and around 300 AD a large swimming pool, the biggest in Roman Britain after the one at Bath were built.

The site may have been levelled around AD 350 possibly because of its owner's support for the usurper emperor Magnentius. It returned to agricultural use and was used for cattle pens.

== Conservation ==
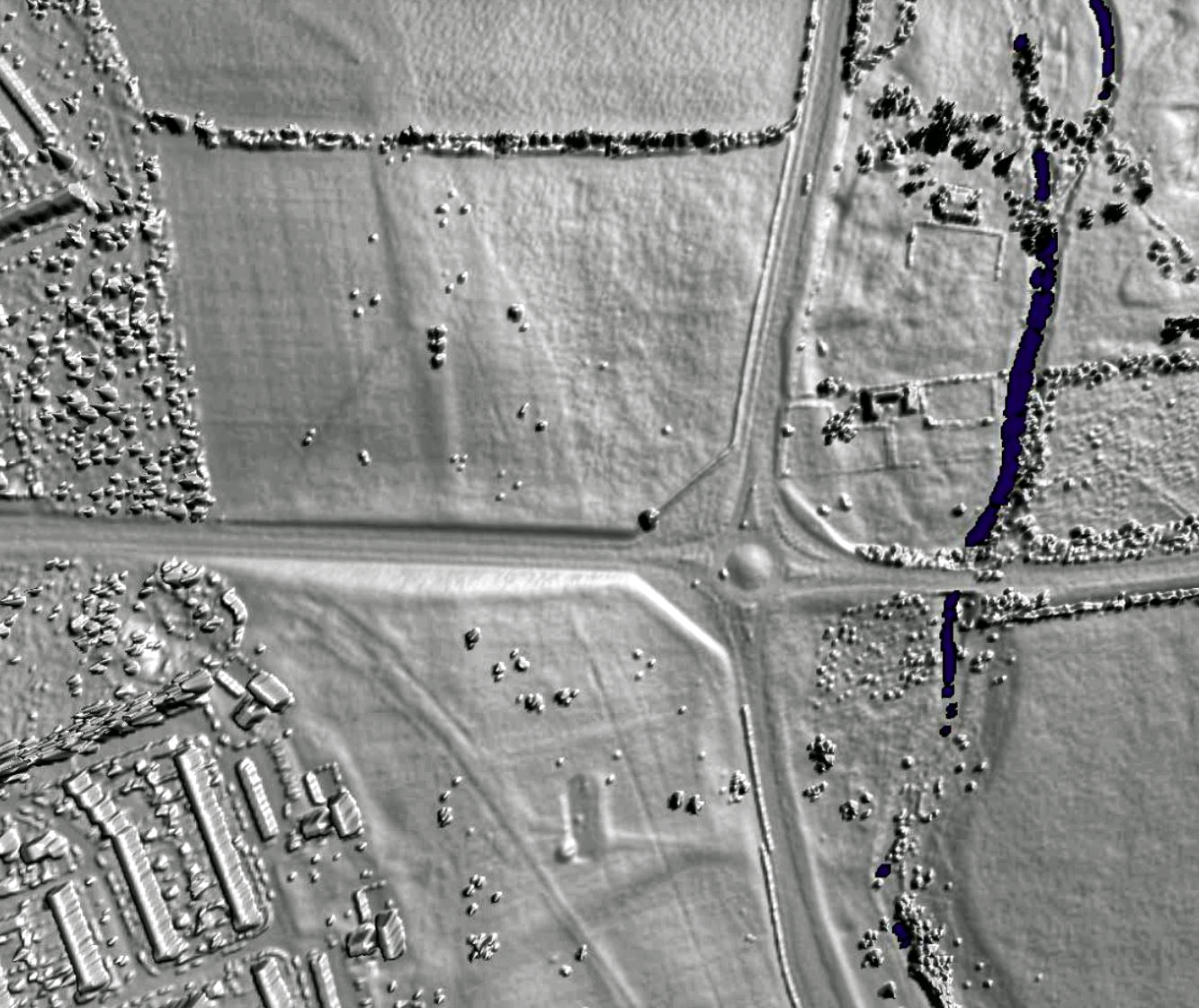
A lidar view of the site of Gadebridge Park Roman villa in Hertfordshire.

The villa is situated in Gadebridge Park. Since the excavations the site has been scheduled and is under grassland. The outline of the building was marked over the grass in 2025.

Artefacts from the villa are held by Dacorum Heritage.

== Sources ==
- Gadebridge Roman Villa Dacorum Heritage Trust, Accessed March 2012
- Neal, David S. (1974). The excavation of the Roman villa in Gadebridge Park, Hemel Hempstead, 1963-8 (Reports of the Research Committee of the Society of Antiquaries of London, 31)
- Yaxley, Susan; others (1981) [1973]. History of Hemel Hempstead. Amplion Press: Hemel Hempstead Local History and Records Society. ISBN 0-9502743-0-5.
- Discover how Dacorum's largest Roman villa evolved 'Our Dacorum', Herts Memories Network. Accessed March 2012
