= River Gade =

River in Buckinghamshire and Hertfordshire, England

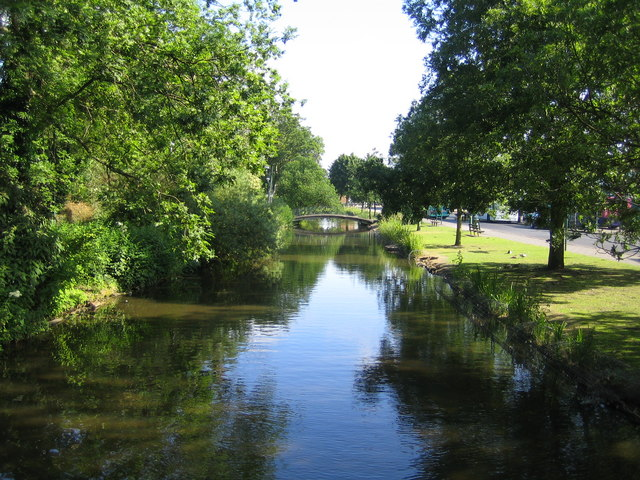
The River Gade in Hemel Hempstead runs through the landscaped "Watergardens"

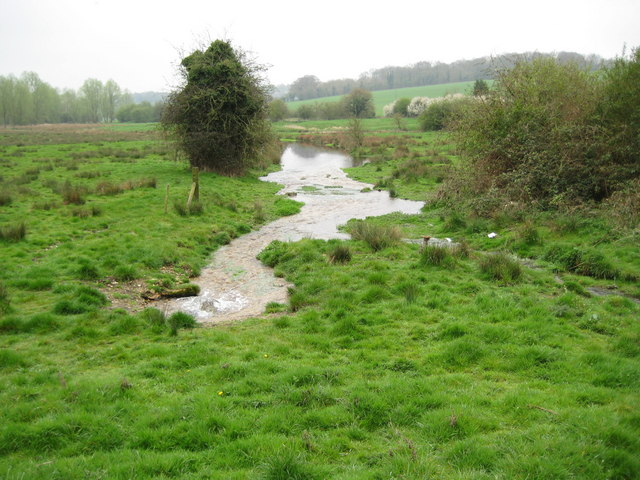
The Gade at Great Gaddesden

The River Gade is a chalk stream running almost entirely through Hertfordshire. It rises from a spring in the chalk of the Chiltern Hills at Dagnall, Buckinghamshire and flows through Hemel Hempstead, Kings Langley, then along the west side of Watford through Cassiobury Park. After passing Croxley Green it reaches Rickmansworth, where it joins the River Colne. For its whole course the Gade is unnavigable, with the exception of a short section in Apsley, Hertfordshire where. it forms a section of the Grand Union Canal.

Its principal tributary is the River Bulbourne which joins it at Two Waters, just below Hemel Hempstead.

The river was once used to power water mills, such as those at Water End, Cassiobury Park and Two Waters as well as powering the John Dickinson paper mills at Apsley and Croxley. The river was diverted to provide this power, but in 2025 the Gade was restored to its natural course.

It supported the farming of watercress at Cassiobury Park, Water End, the Grade II listed Jellicoe Water Gardens and Two Waters until water was diverted from the river in 1947 to supply the growing new town of Hemel Hempstead.

Below Hemel Hempstead it runs alongside and sometimes forms part of the Grand Union Canal.

The remains of a Roman villa were found at Gadebridge Park in Hemel Hempstead.

The Gade is one of the rivers referred to in the name of the Three Rivers district.

It is home to a wide range of biodiversity, including ducks and a range of insect life.

The river bed from the source at Dagnall to Great Gaddesden, about 3 miles downstream is usually dry. After prolonged rain, it will fill and often flood.

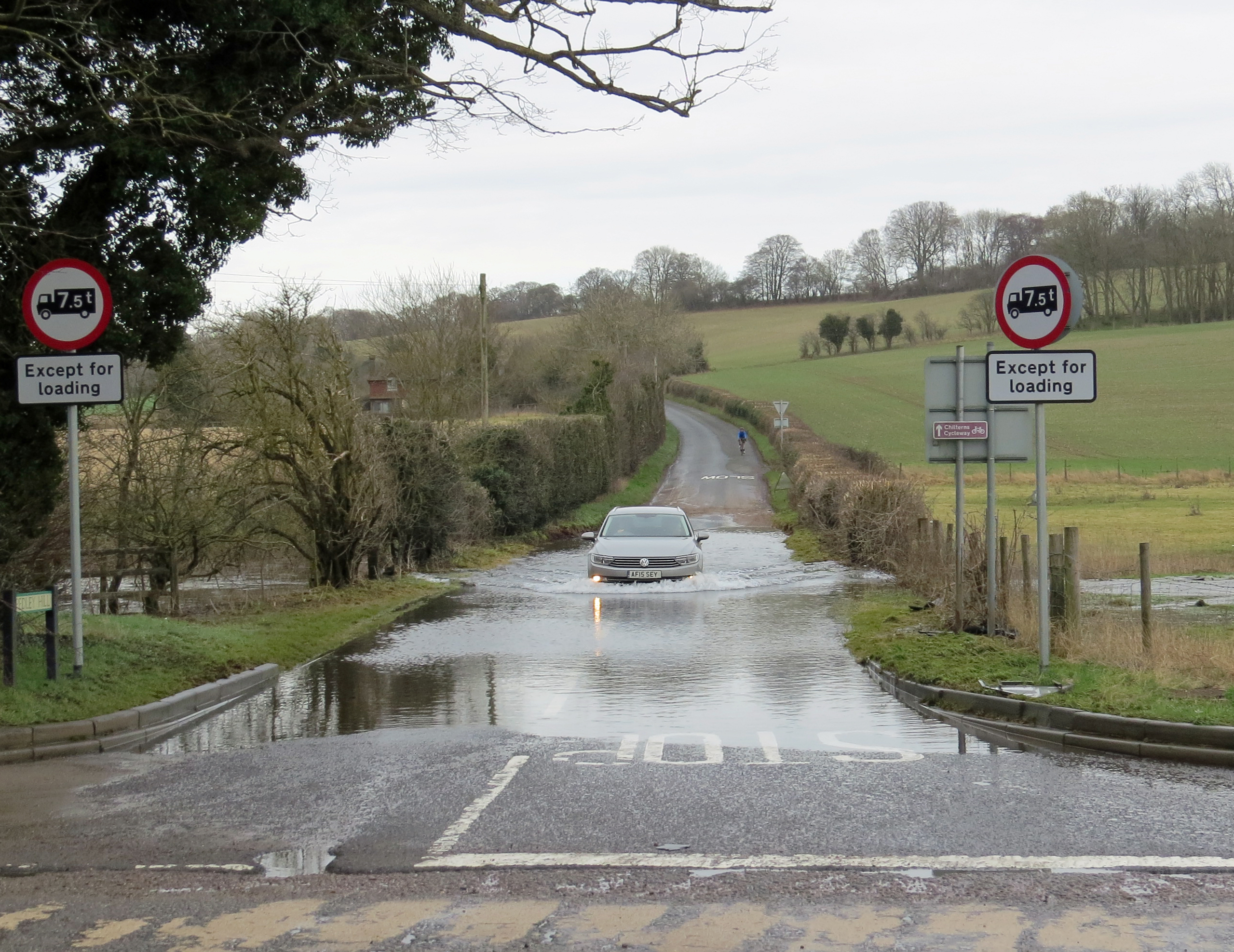
River Gade at Pedley Hill, junction with Hemel Hempstead Road, Feb 2021

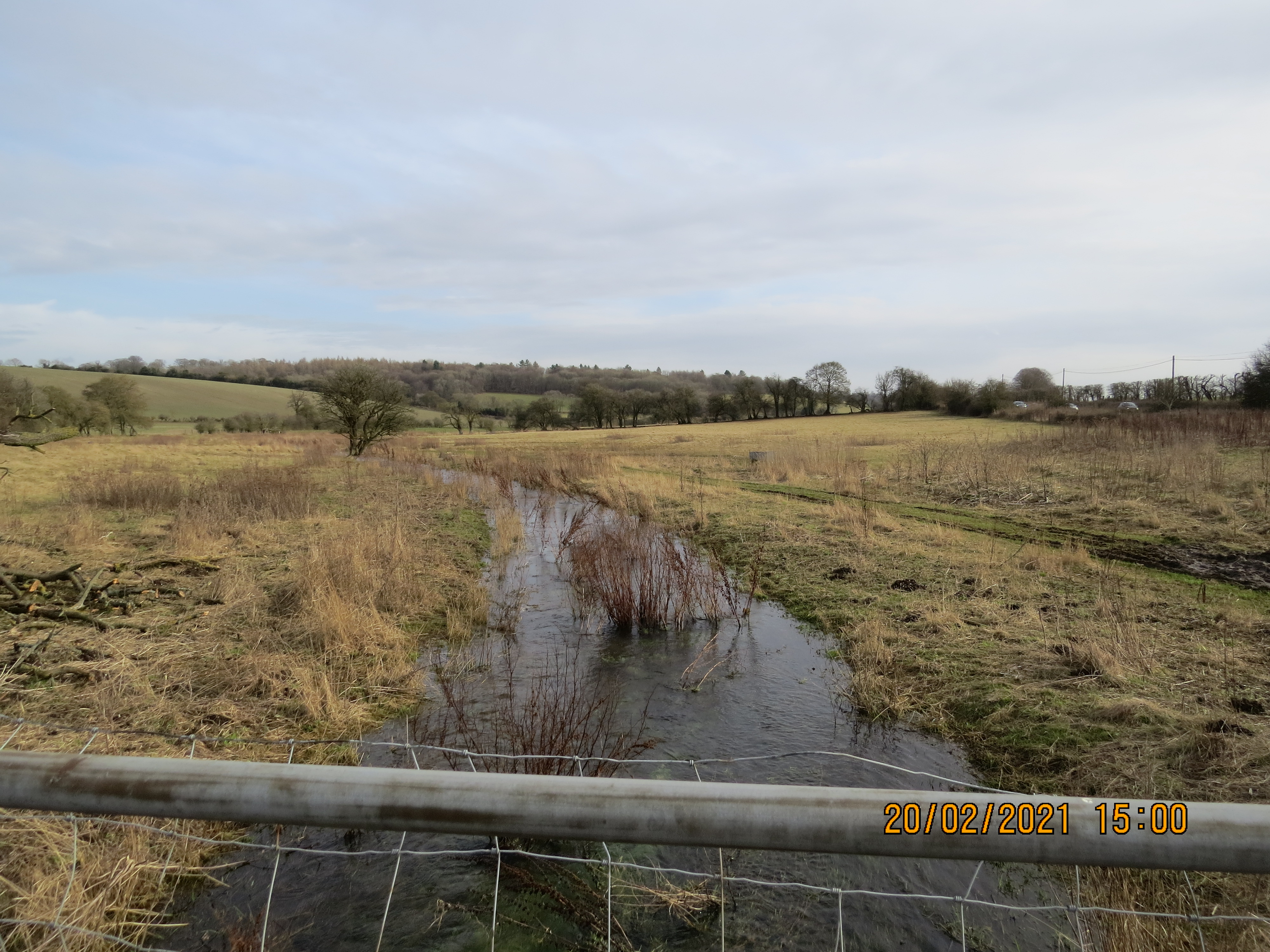
River Gade flowing full at Fourways Farm, Hemel Hempstead Road, Feb 2021
