= Northchurch Roman villa =

Coordinates: 51.773374°N 0.591206°W

Northchurch Roman Villa is a ruined Roman villa at Northchurch, Hertfordshire. The site was excavated in 1973 due to new housing developments on the site.

The excavations uncovered four building phases of a large Roman country estate. First settlement remains come from the middle of the first century BC. No architectural remains were found, but pottery and other finds indicate that there was already a villa at this place. At the beginning of the first century AD, a stone building was erected. At the beginning it consisted of just four rooms with a veranda. In Phase 3 the building was enlarged and received several further rooms and most likely also a second storey. It seems that around AD 170 the villa was abandoned. In the mid third century, the villa was again occupied. In Phase 4 a bath was added on the south side of the complex. The villa was occupied till the end of the Fourth Century.

Some rooms of the villa were decorated with wall paintings. The excavator found one plaster wall fragment with the letter A and was wondering whether these were Christian painting showing once a chi-rho. Stones belonging to a mosaic were found too.

An evaluation of animals found showed that in the second century mainly sheep were kept.

== Conservation ==
The site is a scheduled monument, but it lies beneath a housing development.

== Literature ==
- David S. Neal: Northchurch, Boxmoor, and Hemel Hempstead Station: The Excavation of Three Roman Buildings in the Bulbourne Valley, in: Hertfordshire Archaeology 4 (1974), 1–135, pp. especially pages 53–110
- David S. Neal, Stephen R. Coshː Roman Mosaics of Britain, Volume III: South-East Britain, Part 2, London 2009 ISBN 978-0-85431-289-4, pp. 296–298
