= Sparrows Herne Turnpike Road =

18th-century English toll road

Coordinates: 51.7495°N 0.5343°W

Hertford and Bucks Roads Act 1762
- Act of Parliament
- Parliament of Great Britain
- Long title: An Act for amending, widening, altering, and keeping in Repair, the Road from the South End of Sparrow's Herne on Bushey Heath, through the Market Towns of Watford, Berkhampstead Saint Peter's, and Tring, in the County of Hertford, by Pettipher's Elms, to the Turnpike Road at Walton near Aylesbury in the County of Bucks.
- Citation: 2 Geo. 3. c. 63
- Territorial extent: Great Britain

Dates
- Royal assent: 8 April 1762
- Commencement: 3 November 1761 (Note: Start of session.)
- Repealed: 23 May 1823
Other legislation
Repealed by	Sparrows Herne (Hertfordshire) and Walton (Buckinghamshire) Road Act 1823

Status: Repealed

Text of statute as originally enacted

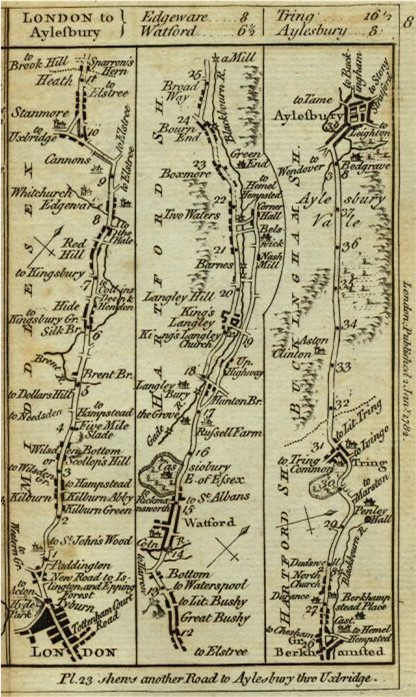
Strip-map of the turnpike from Bowles's Post Chaise Companion (1782)

Sparrows Herne Turnpike Road from London to Aylesbury was an 18th-century English toll road passing through Watford and Hemel Hempstead. The route was approximately that of the original A41 road; the Edgware Road, through Watford, Kings Langley, Apsley, the Boxmoor area of Hemel Hempstead, Berkhamsted, Northchurch, Cow Roast and Tring. Much of this part is now numbered the A4251 road. It linked in with other turnpikes to the north forming a route to Birmingham.

The turnpike trust was set up in 1762 by around 300 landed gentry, who obtained an act of Parliament, the Hertford and Bucks Roads Act 1762 (2 Geo. 3. c. 63), to look after about 26 miles of road between Sparrows Herne near Bushey and Walton near Aylesbury. It was the turnpike's depot at Sparrows Herne which gave the road its name.

The frequent use of the route by heavy carts carrying grain to London made it notorious for its rutted and pitted state even after being made into a turnpike.

The turnpike survived the coming of the railways until 1872, when it passed to the route's various parishes and highway boards to maintain and the tolls were removed.

== Turnpike gates ==
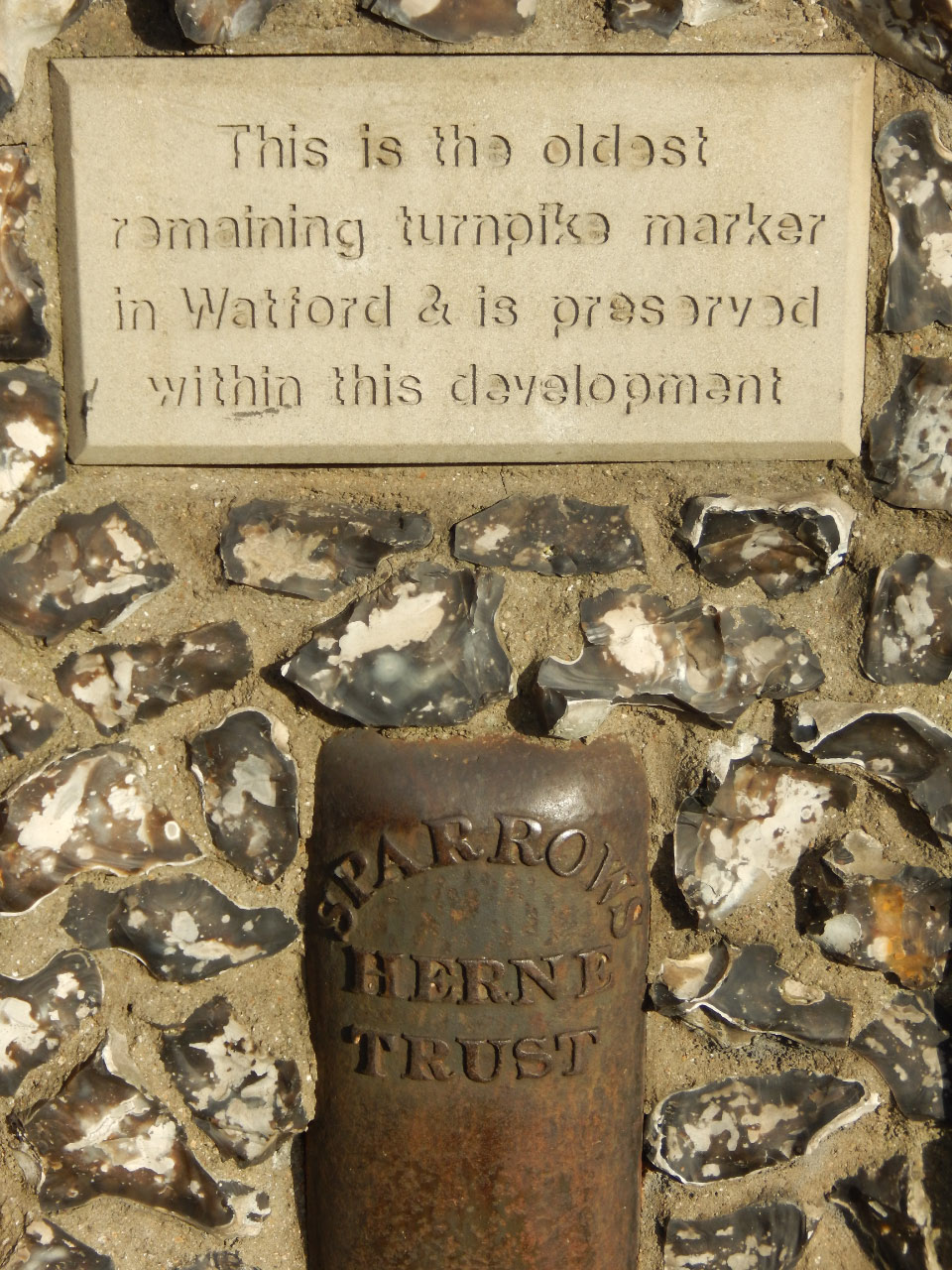
Sparrows Herne Trust marker, by Bushey Arches

The original turnpike gates were:

- Watford Gate at the bottom of Chalk Hill.
- Ridge Lane Gate on the north side of Watford.
- New Ground Gate just to the south of Tring near New Ground Farm,
- Veeches Farm Gate, west of Aston Clinton – this was moved to Aylesbury in 1827 after the road was extended.
- The top of Tring Hill in 1860.

Brick toll houses for these gates were built at a cost of around £25 each. Tollkeepers were appointed and paid 10s/6d a week for which they had to man the gate day and night and from which money they had to pay for the oil for the nighttime illumination of the gates with lamps.

In 1762, the maximum rate for tolls were:

- Horse or beast drawing a coach - 3d
- Packhorse (laden) - 1½d
- Drove of oxen, cows etc. - 10d per score
- Drove of sheep, calves, swine - 5d per score.

An incident at Watford's turnpike, as described in the Watford Observer in 1863, saw a surgeon from Kilburn, London who refused to pay a matter of pennies fined £1 and £2 5s. costs.

A Sparrows Herne Turnpike marker is still situated close to Bushey Arches Viaduct on Lower High Street in Oxhey Village, Watford. It is Grade II listed by Historic England.
