= Northchurch =

Village in Hertfordshire, England

Coordinates: 51.76979°N 0.59050°W

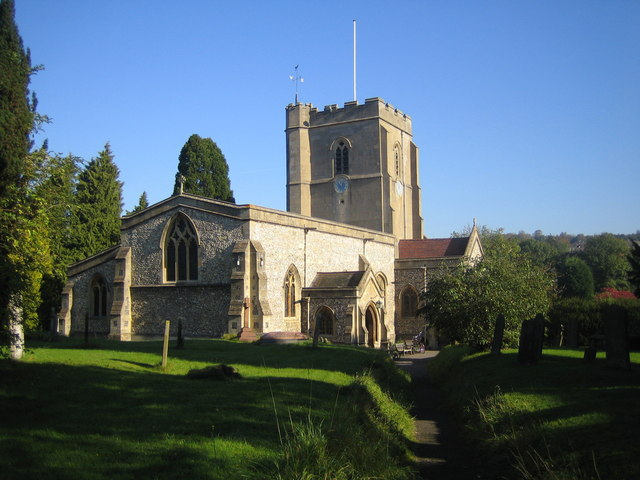
- St Mary's Church, Northchurch

- Location within Hertfordshire
- Population: 2,813 (2011 Census including Cow Roast)
- OS grid reference: SP974088
- District: Dacorum
- Shire county: Hertfordshire
- Region: East
- Country: England
- Sovereign state: United Kingdom
- Post town: Berkhamsted
- Postcode district: HP4
- Dialling code: 01442
- Police: Hertfordshire
- Fire: Hertfordshire
- Ambulance: East of England
- UK Parliament: Harpenden and Berkhamsted

Northchurch is a village and civil parish in the Bulbourne valley in the county of Hertfordshire in the United Kingdom. It lies between the towns of Berkhamsted and Tring.

Situated on the Roman road Akeman Street, a major Roman villa dating from about AD 60 was discovered in the village in the 1970s. The settlement predates the neighbouring larger town of Berkhamsted.

== History ==
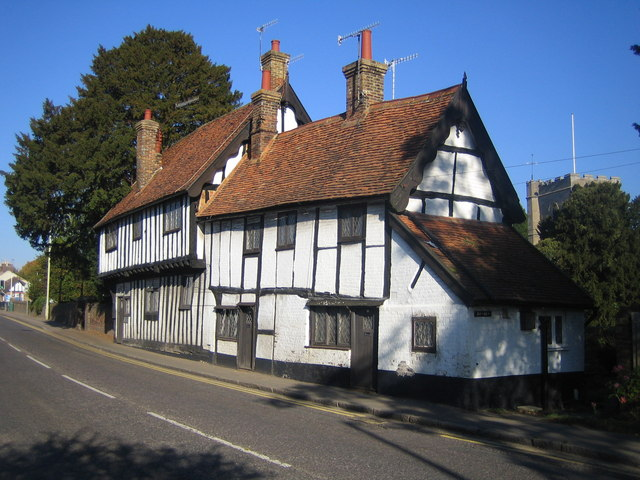
The almshouses, or Church House, dating to the 15th and 16th centuries, are on Northchurch High Street

Other earlier names for Northchurch include Berkhamsted St. Mary and Berkhamsted Minor. Both names support the view that Northchurch may have been the site of the original Berkhamsted which expanded down the Bulbourne Valley following the construction of Berkhamsted Castle 2 miles to the south west. The village eventually became known as the area around the North Church, St. Mary's lying to the Northwest of the newer Parish Church of St. Peter built to the southeast nearer the Castle.

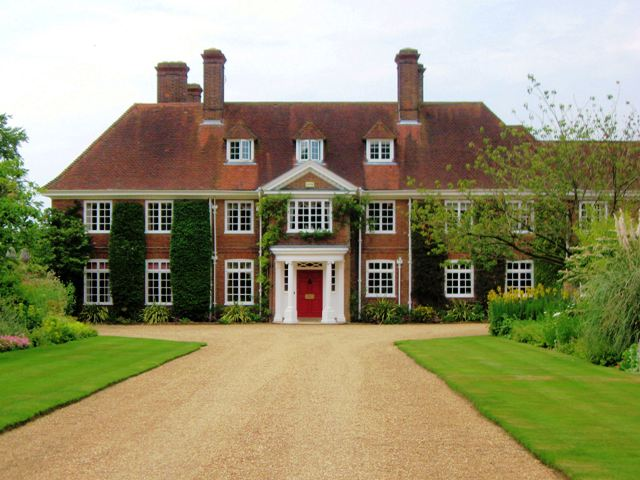
Norcott Hall

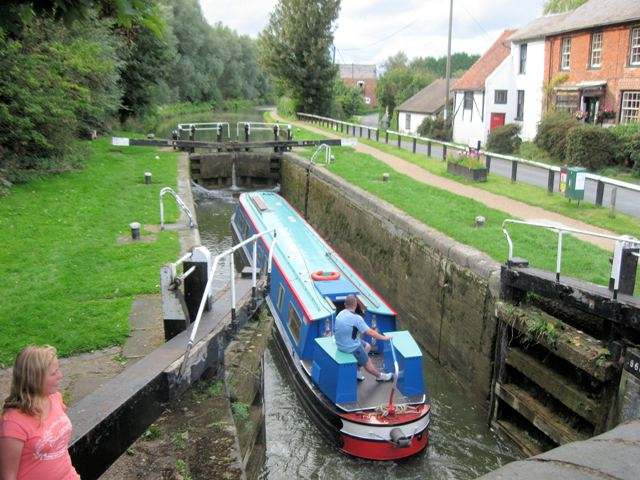
Grand Union Canal

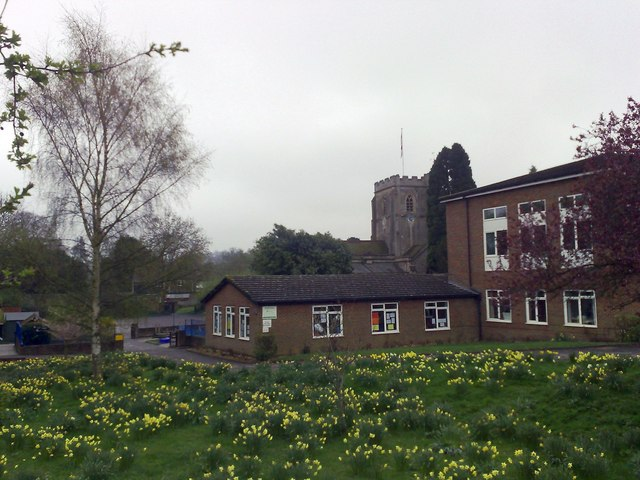
St Mary's School

The parish church of St. Mary dates from Saxon times and is one of the oldest churches in Hertfordshire. Part of the original Saxon building remains in the south and west walls. Flint wall extensions were built between the 11th and 14th centuries, to form a cruciform building. A stone-faced tower was added over the crossing during the 15th century. A Victorian north aisle, vestries and south porch were added in the 1880s. The church is a Grade I listed building.

The village stands on both the River Bulbourne and the Grand Union Canal. The main road running through Northchurch, the A4251, is built over Akeman Street, the original Roman road from London (Londinium) to Cirencester (Corinium). From 1762, the same road formed part of the Sparrows Herne Turnpike Road between Watford and Aylesbury. The parish almshouses, the Church Houses, are two-storey half-timbered houses dating from the 15th and 16th centuries and are Grade II* listed. From 1936 until 1972 Northchurch and Berkhamsted were united under Berkhamsted Urban District Council. Northchurch now forms a part of the Borough of Dacorum, but is recognised as a separate civil parish with its own parish council.

St Mary's churchyard contains the grave of Peter the Wild Boy (c. 1731-1785), a German feral child adopted at the court of King George I and II. His grave can be seen directly outside the main door to the church. Inside the church is a brass memorial of 1785 to Peter, with an engraved head after a portrait by Francesco Bartolozzi.
