= Hemel Hempstead Gazette & Express =

Local newspaper in Hertfordshire, England

- Front page of the Gazette & Express, January 2018
- Format: Tabloid
- Owner: Johnston Press
- Publisher: Premier Newspapers
- Founded: 1858
- Language: English
- Headquarters: Hemel Hempstead, UK
- Circulation: 850 (as of 2023)
- Sister newspapers: formerly the Berkhamsted & Tring Gazette and the Herald Express freesheet
- ISSN: 2514-9458
- Website: hemeltoday.co.uk

The Hemel Hempstead Gazette & Express is a local newspaper in the United Kingdom that covers the towns of Hemel Hempstead, Berkhamsted and Tring and the surrounding area in Hertfordshire.

== History ==
It was first published in 1858 as The Hemel Hempstead Gazette and West Herts Advertiser, this was renamed in 1899 as The Hertfordshire, Hemel Hempstead Gazette and West Herts Advertiser and it was published under this title until 1973. From 1973 it was known simply as the Hemel Hempstead Gazette, and from 1991 as The Gazette. The paper generated two sibling titles, the Berkhamsted & Tring Gazette and a free newspaper, Herald Express, all of which come from the same offices. In May 2017, the Gazette's parent company Johnston Press merged the three titles into on single newspaper, the Hemel Hempstead Gazette & Express.

The paper covers a range of local stories, including reports about crime and violence, planning applications affecting green belt land, stories related to the killer clown craze and film premieres.

In 2005, the Newspaper Society praised the Hemel Hempstead Gazette for its coverage of the Buncefield oil depot explosion. In 2014, the Gazette covered a local controversy about the proposed construction of a Lidl supermarket in Berkhamsted. The public debate attracted attention from national media such as the Daily Mail and was featured on an edition of ITV London News.

In 2018, the Gazette was reprimanded by the Independent Press Standards Organisation for a news item on its Hemel Today website which falsely reported that a former mayor of Dacorum Borough Council had committed suicide after suffering from the effects of the menopause. The story related to another woman of the same name, and the Gazette apologised to the former mayor.

== Publication, production and ownership ==
The Hemel Hempstead Gazette & Express is part of Premier Newspapers Ltd which itself is part of the Johnston Press group of local newspapers. It is printed in Sheffield. It is published on Wednesdays.

The Gazette's website is published under the title Hemel Today, with archives going back to 1990, with corresponding mirror websites entitled Berkhamsted Today and Tring Today.

Previously, about 10 people worked in the editorial department which was based at Newspaper House, 39 Marlowes, Hemel Hempstead, Herts, HP1 1LH. In January 2014 Johnston Press closed the Gazette office, and the editorial staff are now remote workers. The Gazette's paper archive is now held by Dacorum Heritage.
