= Akeman Street =

Roman road in southern England

Coordinates: 51.88624°N 1.19202°W

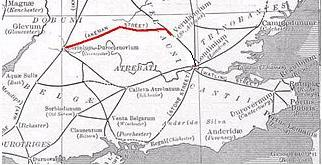
- Roman roads in south east England with Akeman Street in red

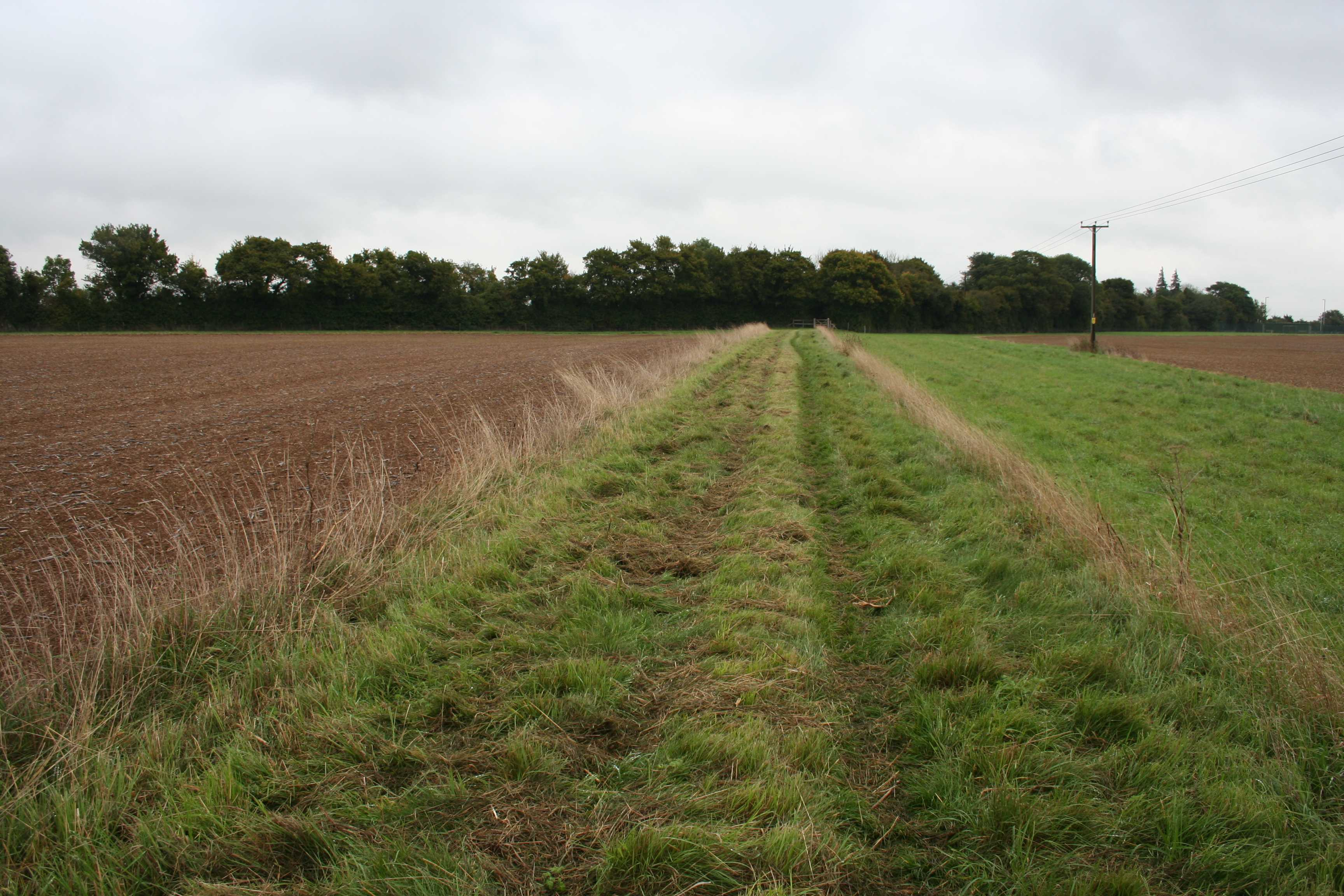
- Akeman Street north of Woodstock, here part of the Oxfordshire Way

Route information
- Length: 117 km (73 mi)
- Time period: Roman Britain
- Margary number: 16

Major junctions
- From: Verulamium (St Albans)
- To: Corinium Dobunnorum (Cirencester)

Location
- Country: United Kingdom
- Counties: Hertfordshire, Buckinghamshire, Oxfordshire, Gloucestershire

Road network
- Roman roads in Britannia

Akeman Street is a Roman road in southern England between the modern counties of Hertfordshire and Gloucestershire. It is approximately 117 kilometres (73 mi) long and runs roughly east–west.

Akeman Street linked Watling Street just north of Verulamium (near modern St Albans) with the Fosse Way at Corinium Dobunnorum (now Cirencester). Evidence suggests that the route may well have been an older track, metalled and reorganised by the Romans. Its course passes through towns and villages including Hemel Hempstead, Berkhamsted, Tring, Aylesbury, Alchester (outside modern Bicester), Stonesfield (where a large Roman villa was discovered around 1712), Chesterton, Kirtlington, Ramsden and Asthall.

Parts of the A41 road between Berkhamsted and Bicester use the course of the former Roman road, as did the Sparrows Herne turnpike between Berkhamsted and Aylesbury. A minor road between Chesterton and Kirtlington also uses its course. Other parts are in use as public footpaths, including a 6-mile (10 km) stretch between Tackley and Stonesfield that is part of the Oxfordshire Way.

== See also ==
- Roman Britain
- Roman roads in Britain
- RAF Akeman Street

== Sources ==
- Copeland, Tim (2009). Akeman Street Moving Through Iron Age and Roman Landscapes. History PressLtd. ISBN 978-0-7524-4732-2.
- Davies, Hugh (2002). Roads in Roman Britain. Stroud: Tempus. ISBN 9780752425030.
