= Potten =

Potten may refer to:

- Agnes Potten (died 1556), Ipswich martyr
- Nettleden with Potten End, a village in Hertfordshire, England
- Potten Creek, a tributary to the River Roach
- The plural of the Dutch word pot (see Dutch orthography)
- Potten End, a village in west Hertfordshire, England
