= Berkhamsted =

Town in Hertfordshire, England

Coordinates: 51.76°N 0.56°W

- Town
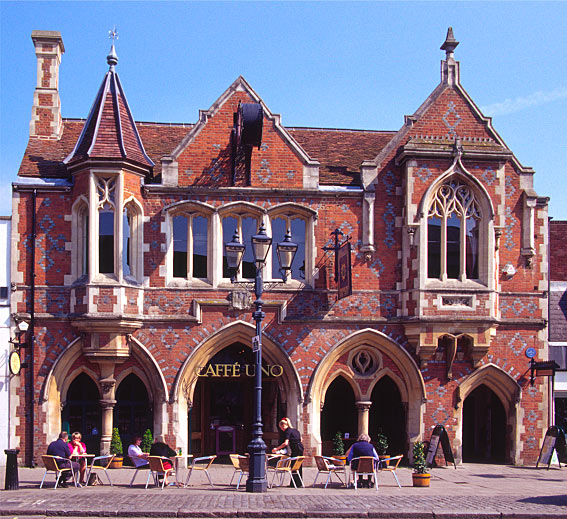
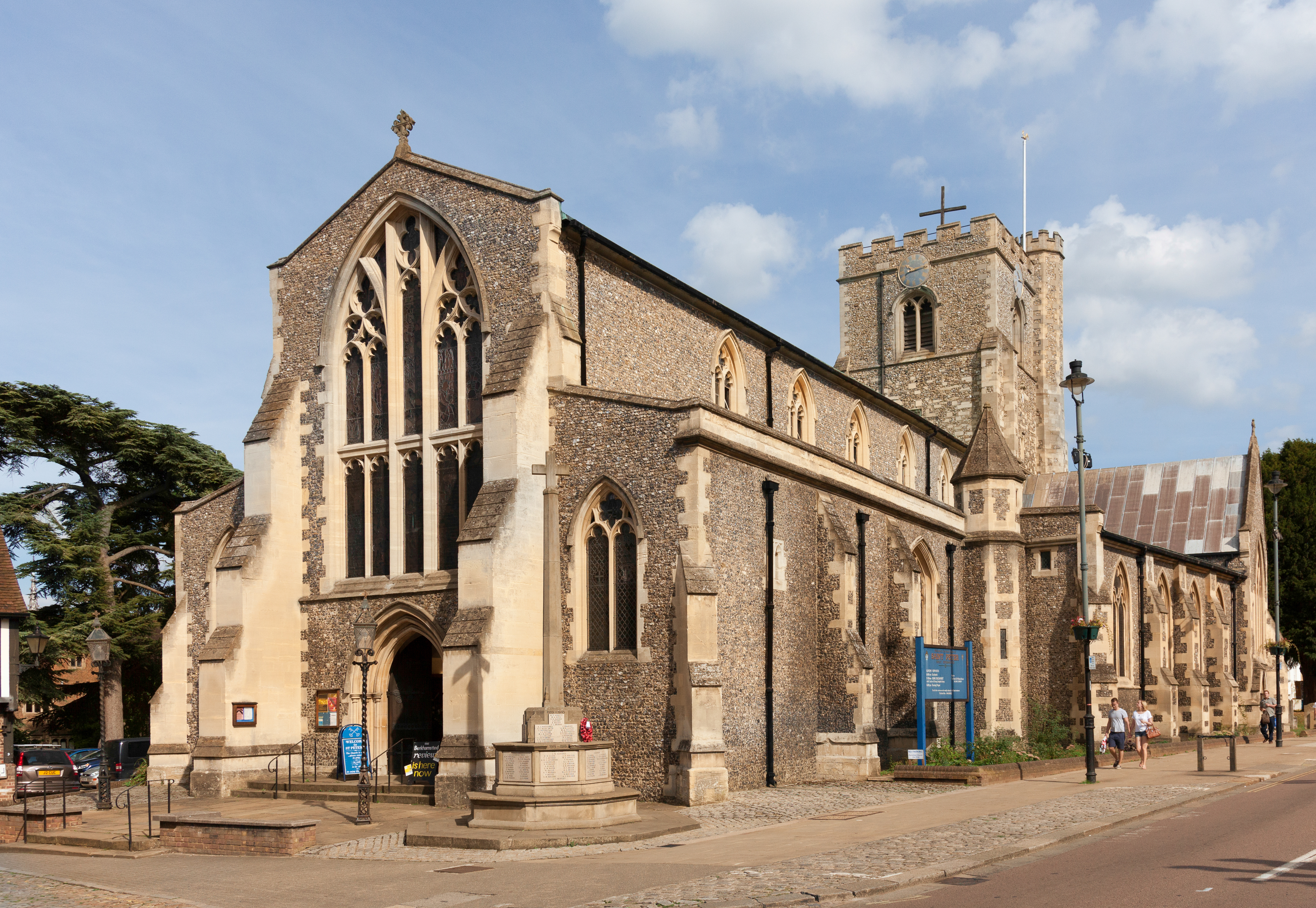
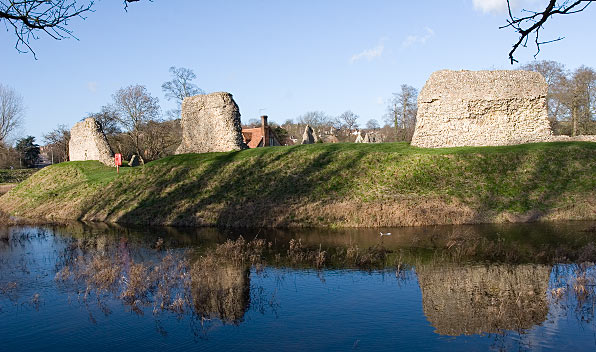
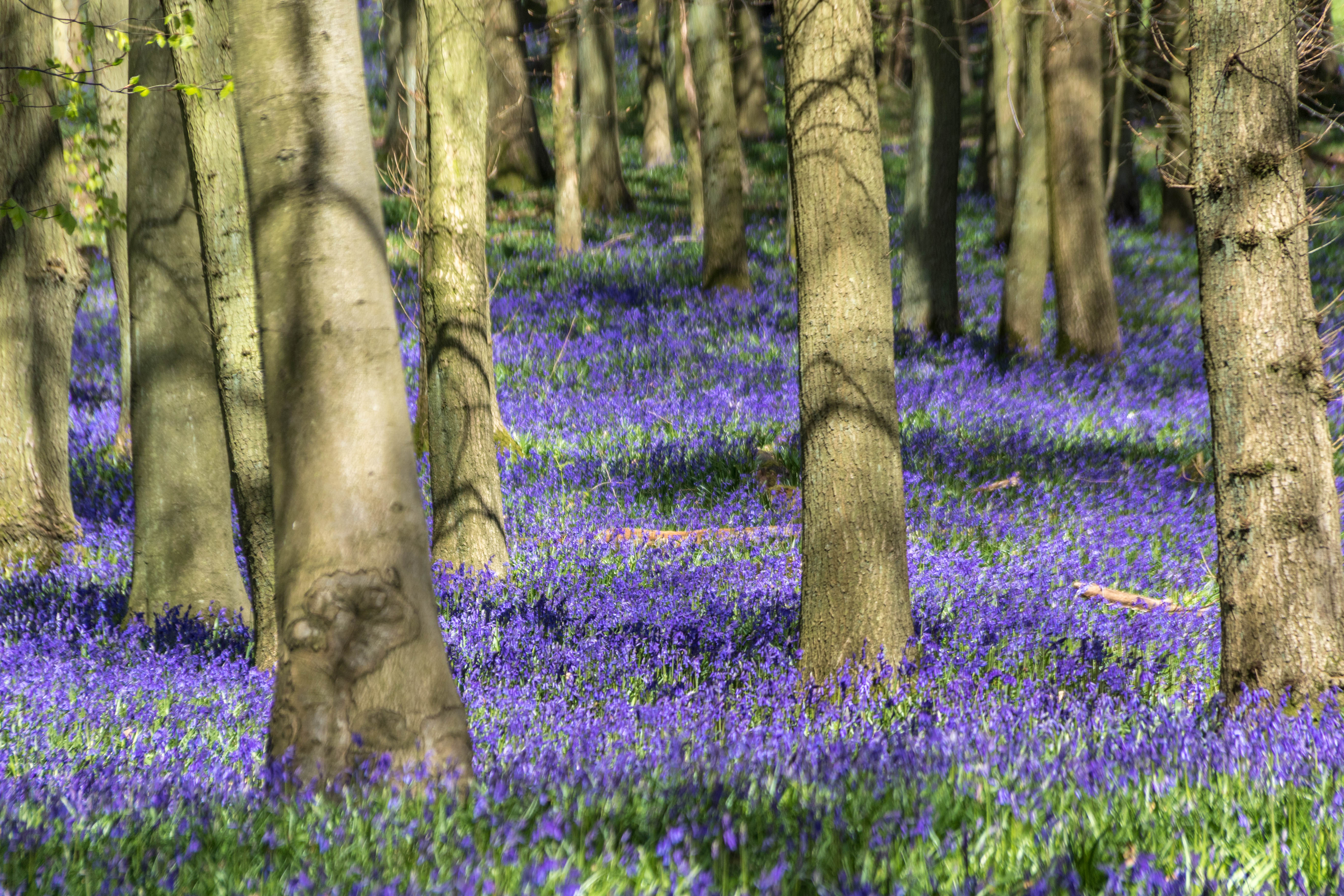
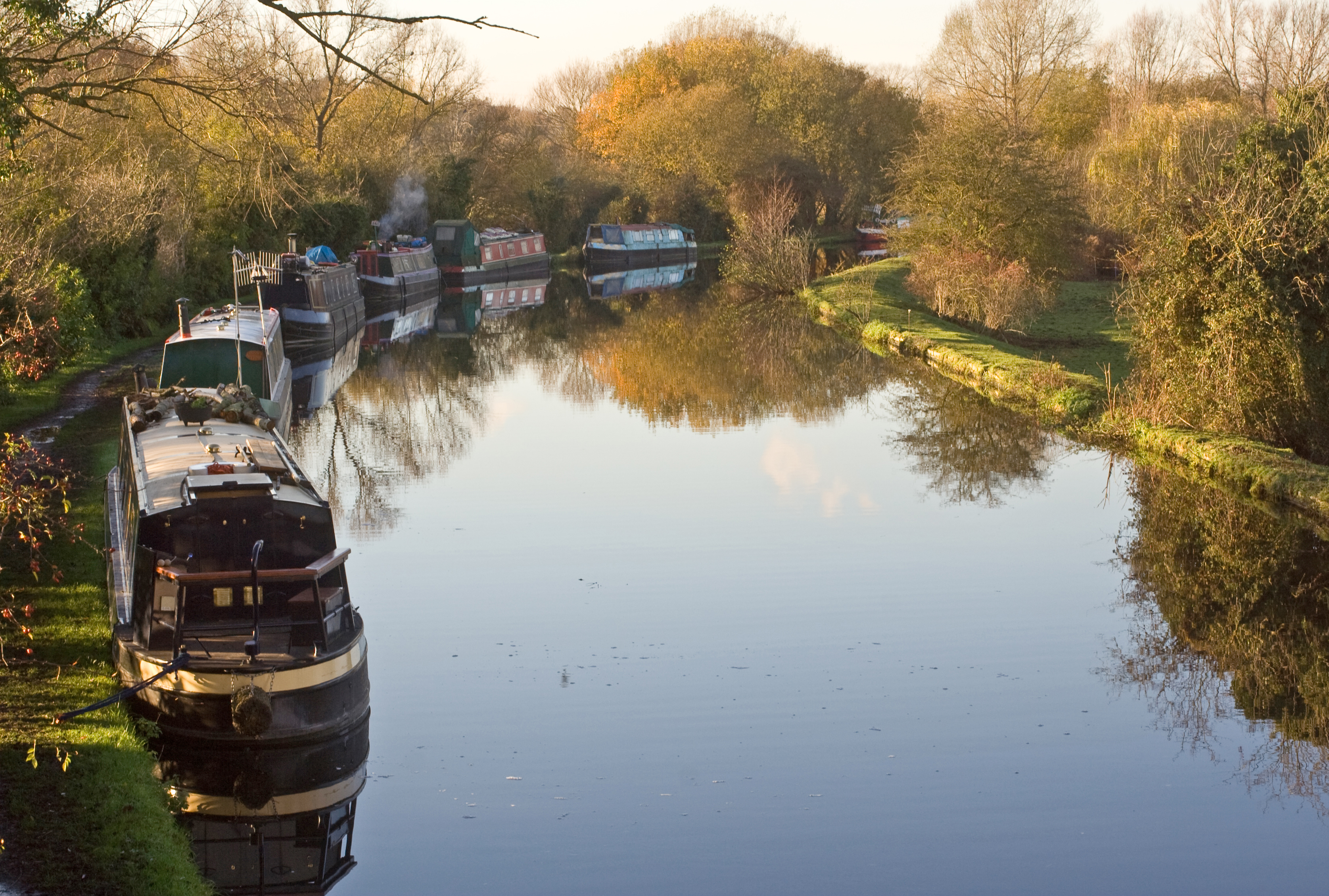
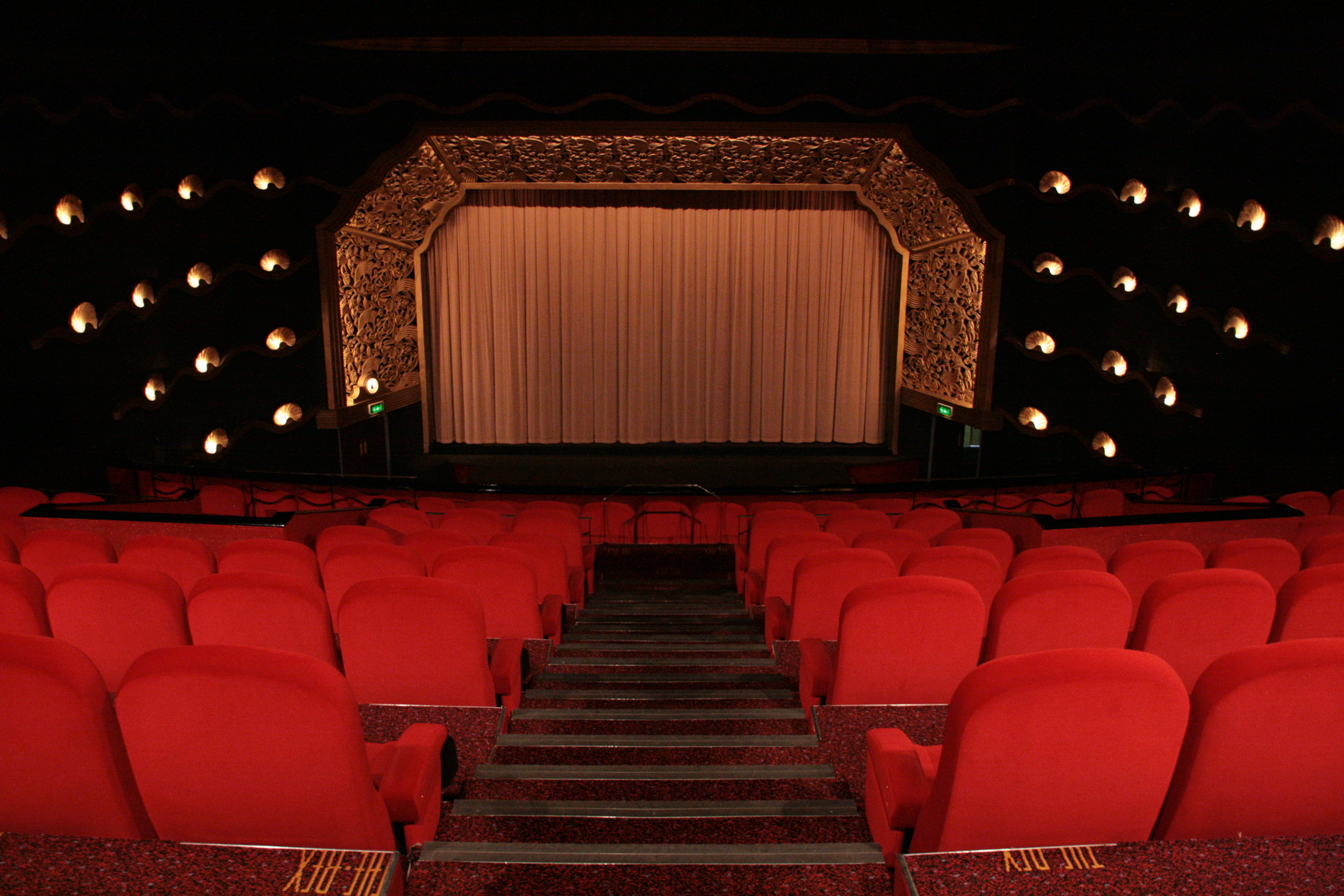
- Town Hall St Peter's Church Berkhamsted Castle Ashridge Grand Union Canal The Rex cinema

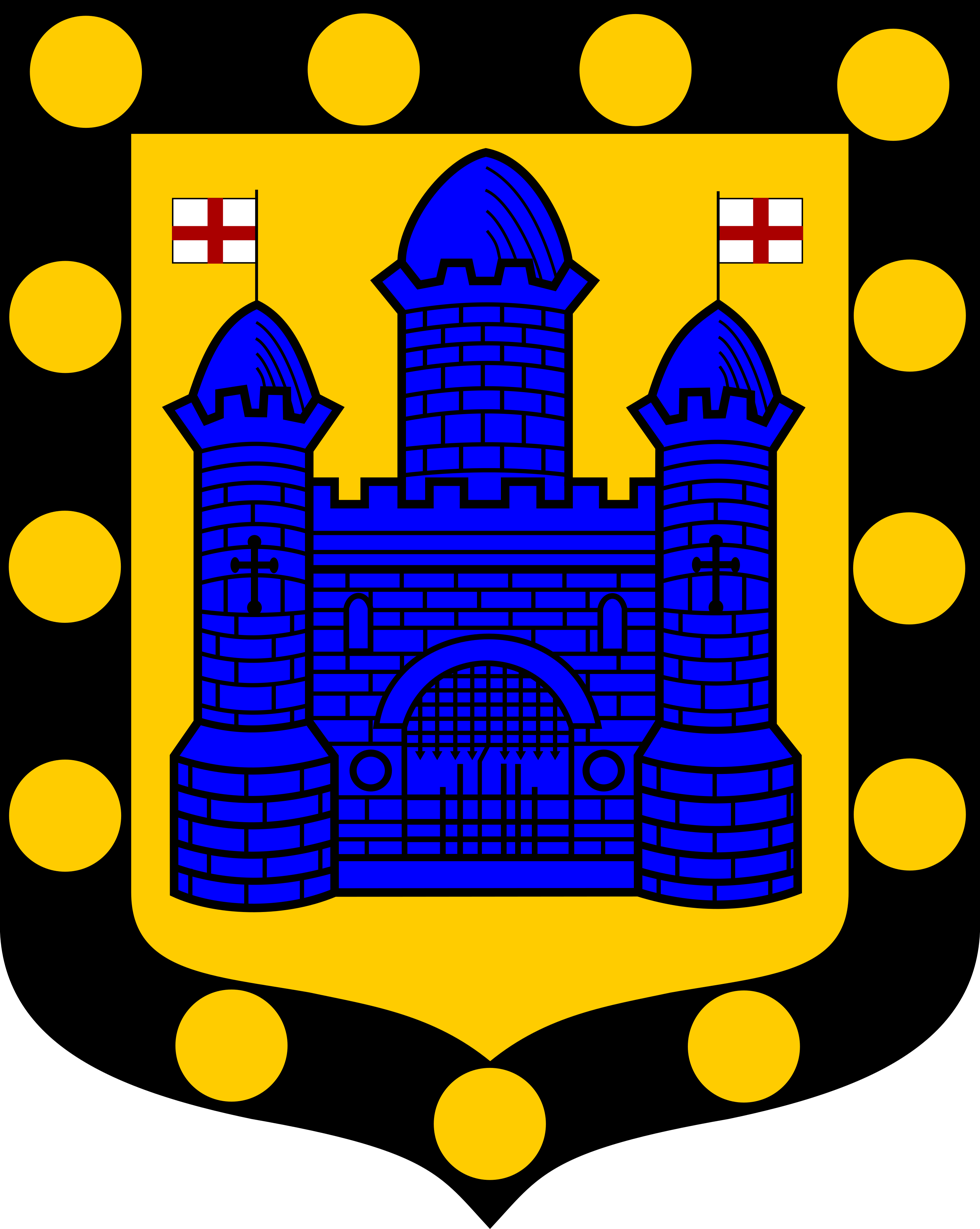
- Coat of arms

- Location within Hertfordshire
- Population: 21,245
- OS grid reference: SP993077
- District: Dacorum
- Shire county: Hertfordshire
- Region: East
- Country: England
- Sovereign state: United Kingdom
- Post town: BERKHAMSTED
- Postcode district: HP4
- Dialling code: 01442
- Police: Hertfordshire
- Fire: Hertfordshire
- Ambulance: East of England
- UK Parliament: Harpenden and Berkhamsted

Berkhamsted (/ˈbɜːrkəmstɛd/ BUR-kəm-sted) is a market town in Hertfordshire, England. Located in the Bulbourne Valley, it is 26 miles (42 km) north-west of London and had a population of 21,245 at the 2021 census. The town is a civil parish within the borough of Dacorum, which is based in the neighbouring large new town of Hemel Hempstead. Berkhamsted, along with the adjoining village of Northchurch, is surrounded by countryside and the Chiltern Hills, an Area of Outstanding Natural Beauty.

Berkhamsted was first mentioned in 970 AD and was recorded as a burbium (ancient borough) in the Domesday Book in 1086. A (now ruined) motte-and-bailey Norman castle was built shortly after the Norman Conquest and remained a royal possession and residence for four centuries. In the 13th and 14th centuries, the town was a wool trading centre, with a busy local market. The oldest-known extant jettied timber-framed building in Great Britain, built between 1277 and 1297, survives as a shop on the town's high street.

The town's literary connections include the 17th-century hymnist and poet William Cowper, the 18th-century writer Maria Edgeworth and the 20th-century novelist Graham Greene. Arts institutions in the town include The Rex (a well regarded independent cinema) and the British Film Institute's National Archive at King's Hill, which is one of the world's largest film and television archives. Schools in the town include Berkhamsted School, a co-educational boarding independent school (founded in 1541 by John Incent, Dean of St Paul's Cathedral); Ashlyns School, a state school, whose history began as the Foundling Hospital established in London by Thomas Coram in 1742; and Ashridge Executive Education, a business school offering degree courses, which occupies the Grade I listed neo-Gothic Ashridge House.

== Toponymy ==
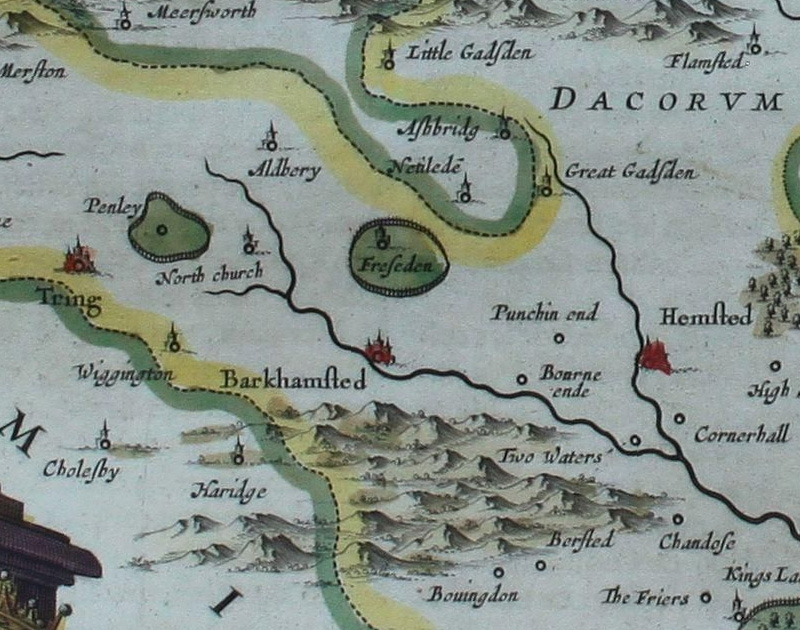
Joan Blaeu map of Hertfordshire from 1659, showing Barkhamsted [sic], one of the many archaic spellings of the town's name

The earliest recorded spelling of the town's name is the 10th century Anglo-Saxon Beorhðanstædæ. The first part may have originated from either the Old English words beorg, meaning "hill", or berc or beorc, meaning "birch"; or from the older Old Celtic word Bearroc, meaning "hilly place". The latter part, "hamsted", derives from the Old English word for homestead. So the town's name could be either mean "homestead amongst the hills" or the "homestead among the birches".

Through history, spellings of the town's name have changed. Local historian Rev John Wolstenholme Cobb identified over 50 different versions of the town's name since the writing of the Domesday Book; these include "Berkstead", "Berkampsted", "Berkhampstead", "Muche Barkhamstede", "Berkhamsted Magna", "Great Berkhamsteed" and "Berkhamstead". In 1937, the name was changed by the local council from Great Berkhampstead to Berkhamsted. The town is known locally as "Berko".

== History ==
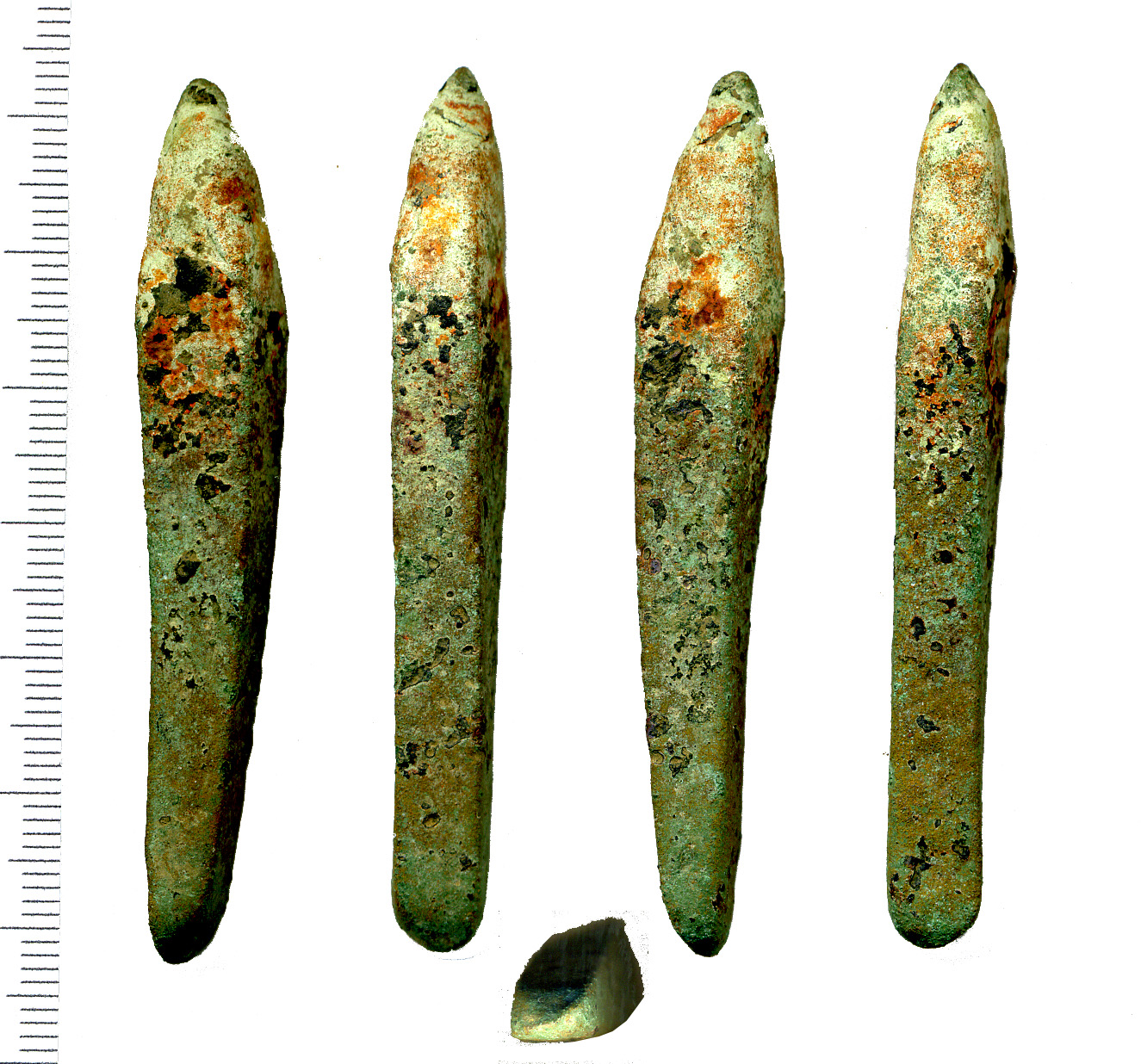
An Early Middle Bronze Age (c.1500-1300 BC) copper chisel, found in Berkhamsted

=== Early history ===
Neolithic, Bronze Age, Iron Age and Roman artefacts show that the Berkhamsted area of the Bulbourne Valley has been settled for over 5,000 years.

A major iron production around Northchurch is considered to be one of the most important late Iron Age and Roman industrial areas in England; this led to the settlement of a Roman town at Cow Roast, about two miles (three kilometres) north-west of Berkhamsted. Other evidence of settlement includes a pottery kiln on Bridgewater Road. The town's high street still follows the line of the Roman-engineered Akeman Street, which had been a pre-existing route from St Albans (Verulamium) to Cirencester (Corinium).

During the Roman occupation, which lasted until 410 AD, the Berkhamsted area appears to have been divided into two or three farming estates, with villa buildings; remains of a villa were found close to the river. A Roman-British villa, dyke and temple were found 1.25 miles (2.0 km) away from the castle at Frithsden. Excavations in 1954 revealed masonry foundations and tesserae floors. Together, the villa, dyke and temple form a unique complex, suggesting occupation in the late Iron Age and Roman period.

The earliest written reference to Berkhamsted is in the will of Ælfgifu (died 970 CE), the wife of King Eadwig of England (r. 955–959), who bequeathed land including Berkhamsted. Rare Anglo-Saxon pottery dating from the 7th century and 9th century water mills demonstrate the existence of Anglo-Saxon settlement. The church may have been an important minster, which became part of the medieval manor of Berkhamsted after the Norman Conquest. The church held various synods at Berkhamsted during the medieval period.

By the 14th century, the adjoining village of "Berkhamsted St Mary" or "Berkhamsted Minor" had become "North Church", later "Northchurch". In 1070 at Berkhamsted, in the presence of the Archbishop of Canterbury, King William the Conqueror vowed to keep the ancient Saxon laws and set up local courts.

=== Middle Ages ===
In the 13th and 14th centuries, the town was a wool trading centre, with a busy local market. The oldest-known extant jettied timber-framed building in Great Britain, built between 1277 and 1297, survives as a shop on the town's high street.

The Domesday survey records that there was enough land for 26 plough teams, but only 15 working teams. There were two flour mills, woodland for 1,000 pigs and a vineyard. The population was calculated at either 37 or 88 households. (Note: Later in the Middle Ages, the Tring Hundred merged with the Danais Hundred, "which overlapped it", to form the Dacorum Hundred (Danais referred to Danish settlers in the area). A monk writing about this area described it as "the Hundred of the Danes", using the word Daneis. The word was later incorrectly transcribed as "Danicorum" and subsequently shortened to Dacorum.)

From 1066 to 1495, Berkhamsted Castle, of which only ruins are extant, was a Norman motte-and-bailey castle. was a favoured residence of royalty and the nobility, including King Henry II, Edward the Black Prince, Thomas Becket and Geoffrey Chaucer. Radiocarbon dating indicates that it was probably built post-1066. The castle was a high-status residence and, an administrative centre, it contributed to the growth of the town. In 1227, Richard of Cornwall, was given the castle, (Note: One of the wealthiest men in Europe, Richard, 1st Earl of Cornwall, was elected King of Germany, or Holy Roman Emperor, in 1256.) redeveloped it as a palatial residence and the centre for the administration of the Earldom of Cornwall. In 1317, the castle was given to Edward II's Queen, Isabella of France.

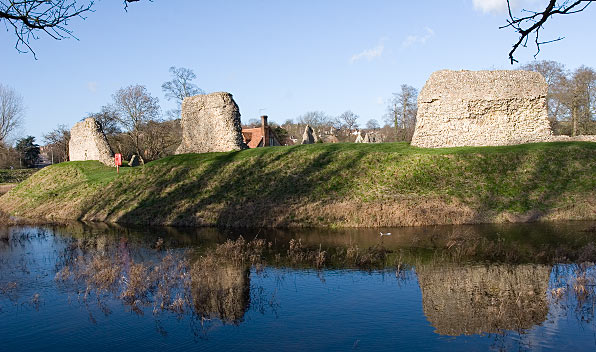
Berkhamsted Castle ruins

Edward III gave the castle to his son, Edward, the Black Prince, under whom Berkhamsted become a centre of English longbow archery, making the longbow a decisive factor in the English victory at the Battle of Crécy. In 1400, Henry IV lived in the castle after he deposed Richard and, during this time, Geoffrey Chaucer – later famous for writing The Canterbury Tales – oversaw renovation work on the castle in his role as Clerk of Works at Berkhamsted. Henry V and Henry VI owned the castle; in 1469, Edward IV gave the castle to his mother, Cecily Neville, Duchess of York, who had a significant social and financial impact on the town and was the last person to live in the castle.

In 1833, the castle was the first building in the United Kingdom to receive statutory protection. The castle ruins are managed by the Berkhamsted Castle Trust, in partnership with English Heritage, for the Duchy of Cornwall, and are open to the public.

From the 12th to the 15th centuries, the town continued to develop separately on the old Akeman Street 0.4 miles (0.6 km) to the south of the castle and to the west of St Peter's Church. In 1156, Henry II officially recognised Berkhamsted as a town in a royal charter, which confirmed the conditions enjoyed under Edward the Confessor, and also decreed that no market could be set up within 7 miles (11 km) of the town.

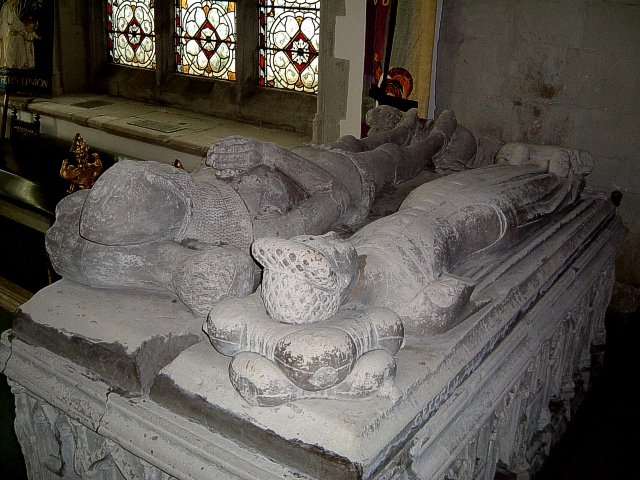
Tomb of Henry of Berkhamsted (who served under Edward the Black Prince at the battles of Crécy and Poitiers) and his Lady

The town became a trading centre on an important trade route in the 12th and 13th centuries, and received more royal charters. In 1216, Henry III relieved the men and merchants of the town from all tolls and taxes everywhere in England, and the growing wool trade brought prosperity to Berkhamsted from the 12th century until the early Tudor period.

In 1217, Henry III recognised Berkhamsted's market by royal charter. (Note: The market had been in existence since at least 1086. It was originally held on a Sunday but, by this charter, it was changed to Monday, as the rector of the new St Peter's Church objected to the noise. The market is now held on a Saturday.) In the mid–13th century, the wealthy banker Abraham of Berkhamsted, financier to the Earl of Cornwall, lived in the town; this was unusual for a small town in a time of heightened persecution of Jews.

At this time, larger houses were built on the south side of the high street including 173 High Street, the oldest known extant jettied building in England). In 1307, Berkhamsted was a large town by English medieval standards, with an estimated population of 2,000 to 2,500. In the 14th century, Berkhamsted (recorded as "Berchamstede") was considered to be one of the "best" market towns in the country. In 1440, there is a reference to lime kilns.

The town benefited when Edmund, 2nd Earl of Cornwall founded Ashridge Priory in 1283, two miles (three kilometres) away and within the castle's park. At the foundation of the abbey, the Earl donated a phial claimed to contain Christ's blood. Pilgrims from all over Europe passed through the town to see the holy relic; the abbey grew quite wealthy as a result. In the 15th century, the town was reaffirmed as a borough by a royal charter granted by Edward IV (1442–1483), which decreed that no other market town was to be set up within 11 miles (18 km). In the 13th and 14th centuries, the town was a wool trading centre, with a busy local market. The oldest-known extant jettied timber-framed building in Great Britain, built between 1277 and 1297, survives as a shop on the town's high street.

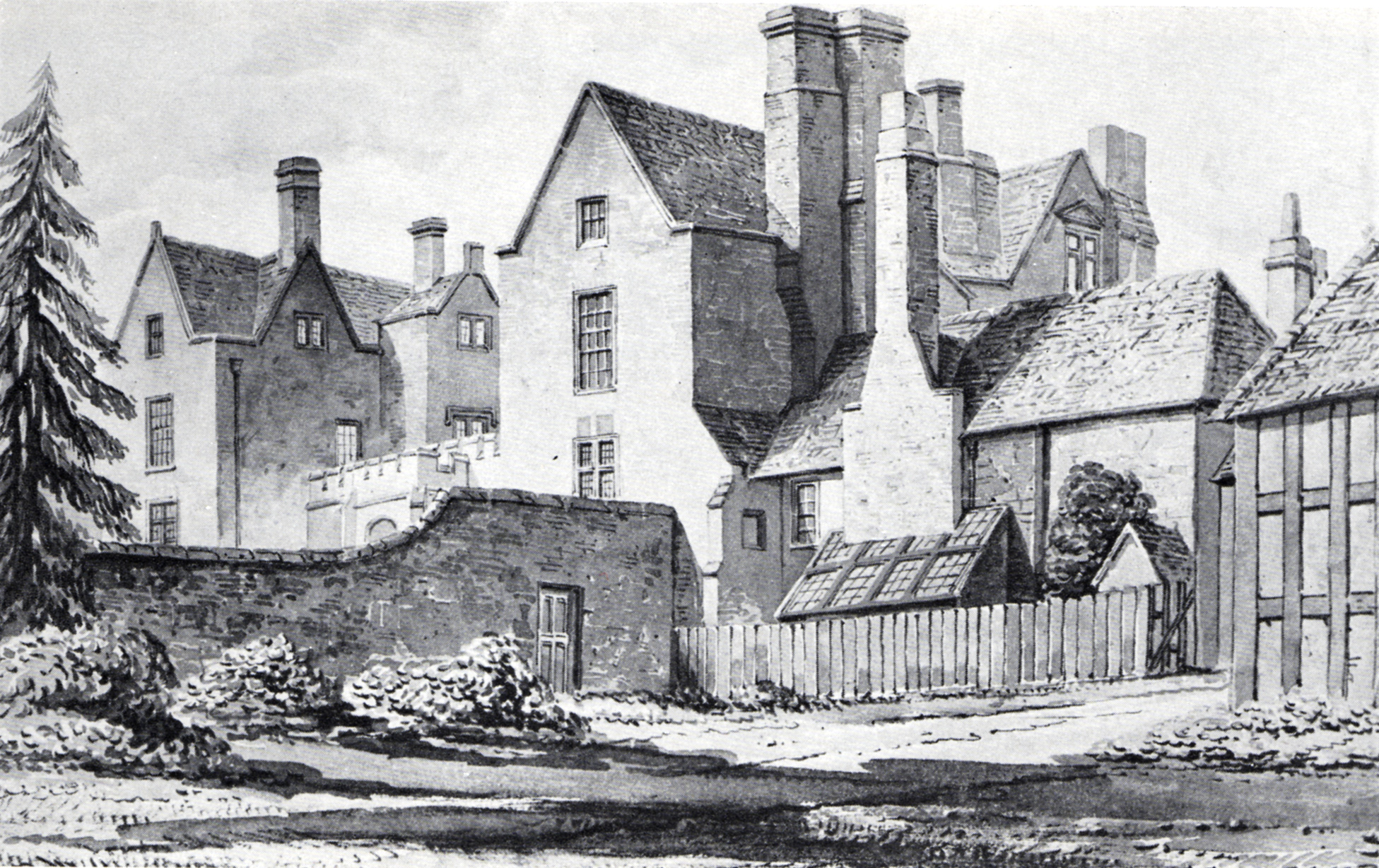
Berkhamsted Place, 1832

In around 1583, a new market house was erected west of St Peter's Church, at the end of Middle Row (alternatively named Le Shopperowe or Graball Row); it was destroyed in a fire in 1854. In 1612, Berkhamsted Place was bought by Henry Frederick, Prince of Wales for £4,000. Henry died later that year and bequeathed the house to his brother Charles (later King Charles I). In 1618, James I reaffirmed Berkhamsted's borough status with a charter.

Following surveys in 1607 and 1612, the Duchy of Cornwall enclosed 300 acres (121 ha) from the Common (now known as Coldharbour Farm), despite local opposition led by Rev Thomas Newman.

Born in Berkhamsted, Colonel Daniel Axtell (1622 – 19 October 1660), played an important part in the English Civil War and participated as in Pride's Purge of the Long Parliament (December 1648), arguably the only military coup d'état in English history. During Cromwell's Protectorate, he appropriated Berkhamsted Place. Shortly after the Restoration of the monarchy Axtell was hanged, drawn and quartered as a regicide. After the Restoration, the town lost its charter granted by James I and its borough status. The population of the town in 1640 and in the 1690s was estimated at 1075 and 767, respectively. The town was a centre of religious nonconformity from the 17th century: over a quarter of the population were Dissenters in the second half of the century.

=== Modern era ===
With the coming of the Industrial Age, Berkhamsted became a gateway through the Chilterns, between the markets of London and the industrial Midlands; the town's population expanded again. In 1868, middle-class villas began to appear south of the High Street. In 1887, John Bartholomew's Gazetteer of the British Isles recorded the population at 4,485.

In the mid-18th century, wood milling and woodturning were the town's most prominent industries, with brush making as an offshoot of the timber industry. The canal trade stimulated the economy of the town and Berkhamsted became a centre for the construction of the barges needed for the canal trades. A boatyard for building canal barges and other boats was one of three important boatyards in Hertfordshire; this site, next to the canal, is the location of the Berkhamsted Canadian totem pole. The construction of the canal had helped to drain the marshy areas along the valley of the River Bulbourne and the area was developed into watercress beds. William Cooper was a veterinary surgeon, who arrived in Berkhamsted in the early 1840s and experimented in treatments for scab in sheep. He formulated an innovative arsenic and sulphur sheep dip. Henry Lane's nurseryman business, founded in 1777, became one of the largest employers in the town in the 19th century. Wood's Ironworks was set up in 1826 by James Wood.

Utilities in the 19th century included a gasworks, installed to provide street lighting in 1849; it was closed in 1959. The Great Berkhamsted Waterworks Company was set up in 1864 on the High Street and mains drainage was first supplied in 1898–99, when effective sewerage was installed.

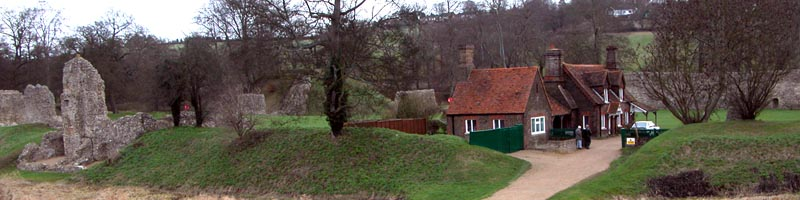
The 19th century soup kitchen, built inside Berkhamsted Castle

In 1725, "An Account of Several Workhouses" records a parish workhouse in Berkhamsted and a parliamentary report of 1777 refers to a parish workhouse. The workhouse system was ended in 1930 and control was given to local council, with the workhouse finally closing in 1935. In 1841, the Countess of Bridgewater built a soup kitchen for the local poor within the ruins of Berkhamsted Castle. The soup kitchen was used by an estimated 15% of the population of Berkhamsted (about 500 people) during the winter months, until at least 1897.

In 1866, the Battle of Berkhamsted Common played an important part in the national preservation of common land. In an action similar to that of many other large estate holders, Lord Brownlow of Ashridge House attempted to enclose Berkhamsted Common by erecting 5-foot (1.5 m) steel fences, in order to claim the land as part of his family's estate. On the night of 6 March, in response to the enclosure action and in defence the historic right of the public to use the ancient common land, men from London's East End dismantled the fences; this became known nationally as the Battle of Berkhamsted Common. The decision of Lord Justice Romilly in the ensuing court case, along with the Metropolitan Commons Act 1866, helped to ensure the protection of open spaces nationally threatened with enclosure. In 1926, the common was acquired by the National Trust.

In 1909, Sunnyside was added to Berkhamsted Urban District; Northchurch joined in 1935. Shortly after 1918, much of the extensive estate belonging to Berkhamsted Hall, at the east end of the High Street, was sold; many acres west of Swing Gate Lane were developed with council housing. More council housing was built at Gossoms End. Development on the north side of the valley was limited, until the sale of the Ashridge estate in the 1930s; after which, housing appeared at each end of Bridgewater Road. In the second half of the 20th century, many of the old industrial firms in Berkhamsted closed, while the numbers of commuters increased.

== Geography ==
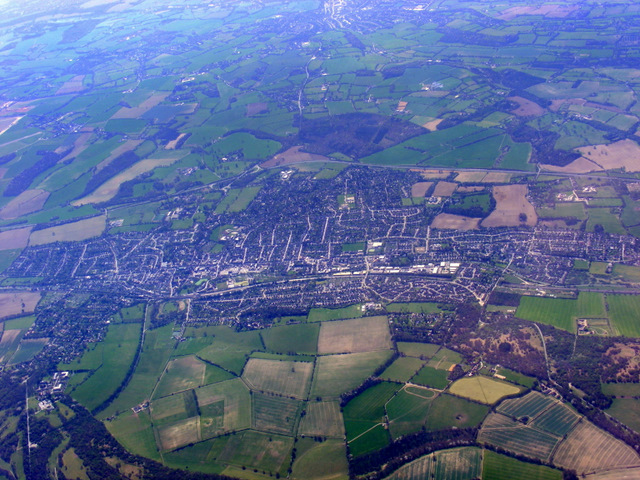
Berkhamsted and Northchurch from the air, looking south across the valley

Berkhamsted is situated within the Chiltern Hills, part of a system of chalk downlands throughout eastern and southern England, believed to have formed between 84 and 100 million years ago in the Cretaceous Period, when the area was a chalk-depositing marine environment. The town is located in a narrow north-west to south-east valley, falling from 590 feet (180 m) above sea level to 344 feet (105 m). The valley is at the southernmost limit of the Pleistocene glaciation ice erosion throughout the Chiltern scarp, giving it a smooth rounded appearance, with alluvial soils in the valley bottom and chalk, clay and flint on the sides.

In the early Mesolithic period (Middle Stone Age, mid-to-late eighth millennium BC), the local upland was mostly pine woodland and the low area of central Berkhamsted probably a grass-sedge fen. In the sixth millennium BC, the dense deciduous forest became well established. By the mid-to-late third millennium BC, during the Neolithic period (the New Stone Age), human activity can be seen in wood clearances; the woodland being then dominated by lime trees, with alder trees growing on the flood plain. The River Bulbourne, a chalk stream, runs through the valley for 7 miles (11 km) in a south-east direction, starting at Dudswell and the adjoining village of Northchurch and running through Berkhamsted, Bourne End and Boxmoor, where it merges with the River Gade at Two Waters in Apsley, near Hemel Hempstead. It was fast-moving and full, and prone to frequent localised flooding. The river created a marsh environment in the centre of the valley. The river powered the watermills (recorded in 1086) and fed the three moats of the large Norman castle, that stands close to the centre of the town.

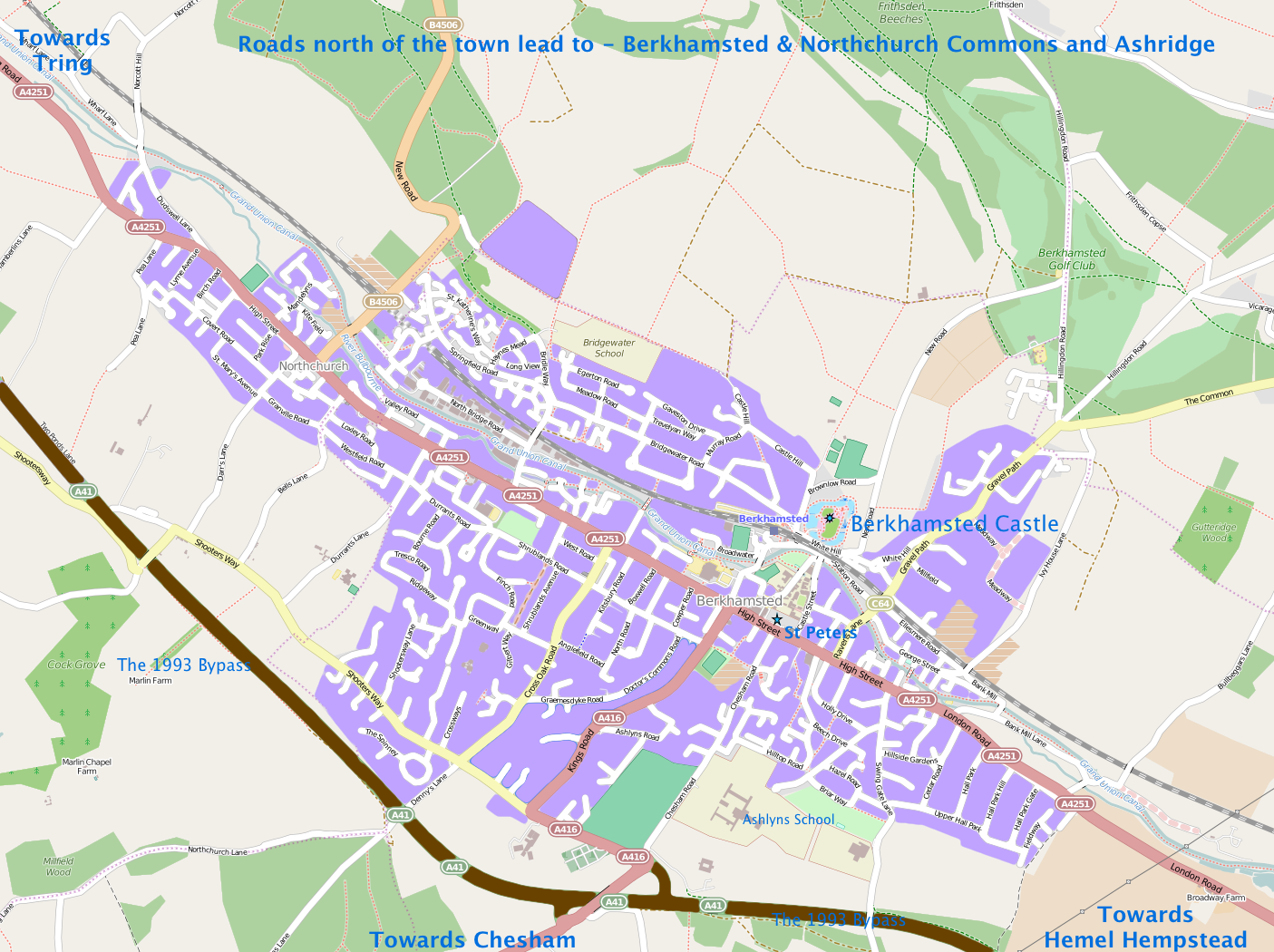
A 2014 map of Berkhamsted and Northchurch.

The countryside surrounding the town includes parts of the Green Belt and the Chilterns Area of Outstanding Natural Beauty (ANOB). The Urban Nature Conservation Study (UNCS) recognises the town's hinterland as a biodiversity resource. The hills gently rise to an undulating and open plateau, which has a mix of arable farmland, common land and mixed oak, ash and beech woodland. On the northeast side of town are the Berkhamsted and Northchurch commons, the largest in the Chilterns at 1,055 acres (427 ha), and forming a large arc running from Northchurch, through Frithsden and down to Potten End. Ownership of Berkhamsted Common is divided between the National Trust and Berkhamsted Golf Club. Beyond the common is the 5,000-acre (2,000 ha) historic wooded parkland of Ashridge; once part of Berkhamsted Castle's hunting park, it is now managed by the National Trust. Ashridge is part of the Chilterns Beechwood Special Area of Conservation (SAC), a nationally important nature conservation area, and is also designated as a Site of Special Scientific Interest. Agriculture is more dominant to the south of the town; close to the Buckinghamshire border there are two former large country estates, Ashlyns and Rossway. The ancient woodland at Dickshills is also located here.

The centre of Berkhamsted is typical of a medieval market town with its long, straight High Street (aligned on the Akeman Street) forming the east–west axis, from which extend medieval burgage plots to the north and south. The town centre slowly developed over the years and contains a wide variety of properties that date from the 13th century onwards. The canal intersects the river at numerous points, taking most of its water supply and helping to drain the valley. The townscape was shaped by the Bulbourne Valley, which rises 300 feet (91 metres) on either side at its narrowest point.

=== Neighbouring settlements ===
Along the Bulbourne Valley, towards London, are the village of Bourne End and the large new town of Hemel Hempstead. To the south-south-east is the large village of Bovingdon and south from Berkhamsted, along the Chiltern Hills into Buckinghamshire, is the hamlet of Ashley Green and the market town of Chesham. Further south-west is the village of Great Missenden and to the west is the small market town of Wendover.

North-westwards are the village of Northchurch, and the hamlets of Dudswell and Cow Roast, Wigginton and the small market towns of Tring and Aylesbury, the county town of Buckinghamshire. Following the Chiltern Hills northwards, to the north-north-west is the village of Aldbury; situated to the north of Berkhamsted are the villages of Ringshall and Little Gaddesden; located to the north-east of the town are the villages and hamlets of Potten End, Frithsden and Great Gaddesden.

=== Climate ===
Like most of the United Kingdom, Berkhamsted has an oceanic climate (Köppen climate classification Cfb).

Climate data for Berkhamsted
Month	Jan	Feb	Mar	Apr	May	Jun	Jul	Aug	Sep	Oct	Nov	Dec	Year
Mean daily maximum °C (°F)	6 (43)	7 (45)	10 (50)	12 (54)	16 (61)	19 (66)	21 (70)	22 (72)	18 (64)	14 (57)	9 (48)	6 (43)	13 (55)
Mean daily minimum °C (°F)	3 (37)	3 (37)	4 (39)	5 (41)	8 (46)	10 (50)	12 (54)	13 (55)	11 (52)	8 (46)	5 (41)	3 (37)	7 (45)
Average precipitation mm (inches)	69.3 (2.73)	59.4 (2.34)	46.5 (1.83)	70.1 (2.76)	58.1 (2.29)	58.9 (2.32)	46.0 (1.81)	68.9 (2.71)	51.7 (2.04)	84.3 (3.32)	93.9 (3.70)	80.9 (3.19)	788.0 (31.02)

== Governance ==
Berkhamsted lies within Harpenden and Berkhamsted, a constituency newly-created by the 2023 review of Westminster constituencies. In the first election to be held in the constituency in 2024, Victoria Collins won the seat for the Liberal Democrats.

Berkhamsted town council represents the area to two higher tiers of local government: Dacorum Borough Council and Hertfordshire County Council. The modern district of Dacorum, based in Hemel Hempstead, was formed in 1974 under the Local Government Act 1972; the local government district's main population centres include Hemel Hempstead, Tring and the western part of Kings Langley. Berkhamsted accounted for just over 12% of the district's population of 153,300 in 2017.

Berkhamsted has three local government wards: East, West and Castle. The result of the 2023 town council elections was: Liberal Democrats 11 councillors, Green 2 and Labour 2.

=== Administrative history ===
Berkhamsted was an ancient borough, but lost this status in the 17th century. The town was then governed by its parish vestry until the 19th century. In 1835, Berkhamsted was made the centre of a poor law union which covered the town and the surrounding parts of western Hertfordshire, as well as parts of Buckinghamshire. Under the Public Health Act 1872, sanitary districts were created, and the boards of guardians of poor law unions were made responsible for public health and local government for any part of their district not included in an urban authority. As Berkhamsted had no local board or other urban authority, it was therefore included in the rural sanitary district.

In 1893, the town petitioned for the creation of a local board covering both Berkhamsted and Northchurch parishes, which would make it independent of the rural sanitary authority. An inquiry was held by a government inspector in December 1893, but he advised against the scheme. Hertfordshire County Council therefore did not pursue it, although did comment that an urban authority covering just the town itself rather than the two whole parishes might be more favourably received.

Under the Local Government Act 1894, rural sanitary districts became rural districts on 28 December 1894 and so the town became part of the Berkhampstead Rural District. Parish councils were also established under the act, to take over the civil functions of the old vestries. The new parish councils came into being on 31 December 1894 if an election had been needed to choose the first parish councillors, as was the case at Berkhamsted.

=== Berkhamsted Urban District (1898–1974) ===
Berkhamsted Great Berkhampstead (1898–1937)
- Urban District
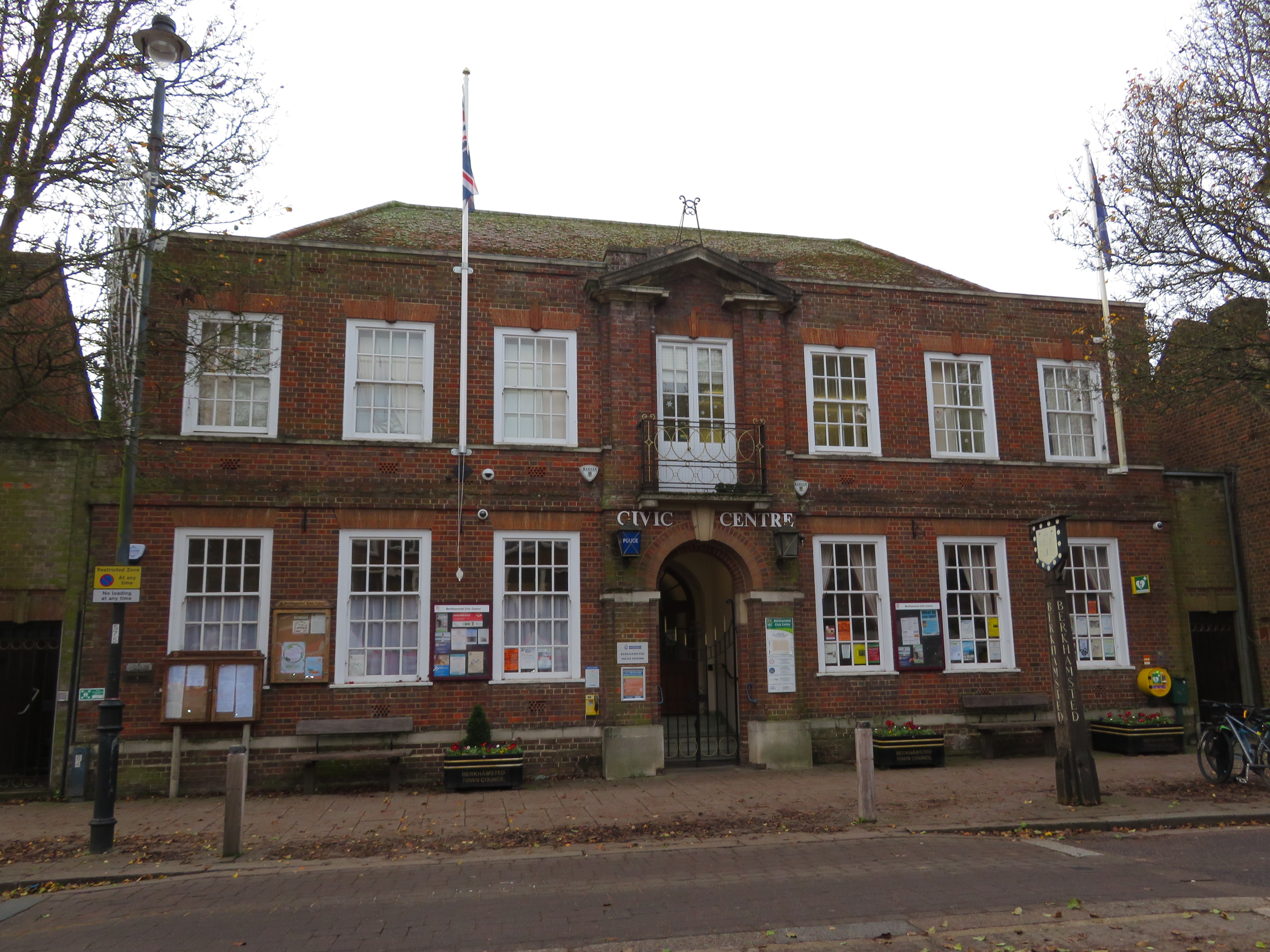
- Civic Centre, 161 High Street, Berkhamsted.
- Population
  - 1901: 6,371
  - 1971: 15,255
- History
  - Created: 15 April 1898
  - Abolished: 31 March 1974
  - Succeeded by: Dacorum
  - HQ: Berkhamsted
- Contained within
  - County Council: Hertfordshire

In 1898, the parish was split into a Great Berkhampstead Urban parish, which became an urban district, and a "Great Berkhampstead Rural" parish, which remained in the Berkhampstead Rural District. The Great Berkhampstead Rural parish ceded land to the urban district in 1935 and was split between Nettleden with Potten End, Northchurch, and Great Gaddesden in 1937. Older municipal buildings were demolished in 1938 and the new Civic Centre was built on the site.

Until 1937, the official name of the council's area was the Great Berkhampstead Urban District. A change of name to Berkhamsted Urban District came into effect on 19 July 1937. A few months later, the neighbouring Berkhampstead Rural District became Berkhamsted Rural District. Under the Local Government Act 1972, Berkhamsted Urban District was abolished to become part of the non-metropolitan district of Dacorum in 1974. Berkhamsted Town Council was created as a successor parish to the former urban district council.

== Coat of Arms ==
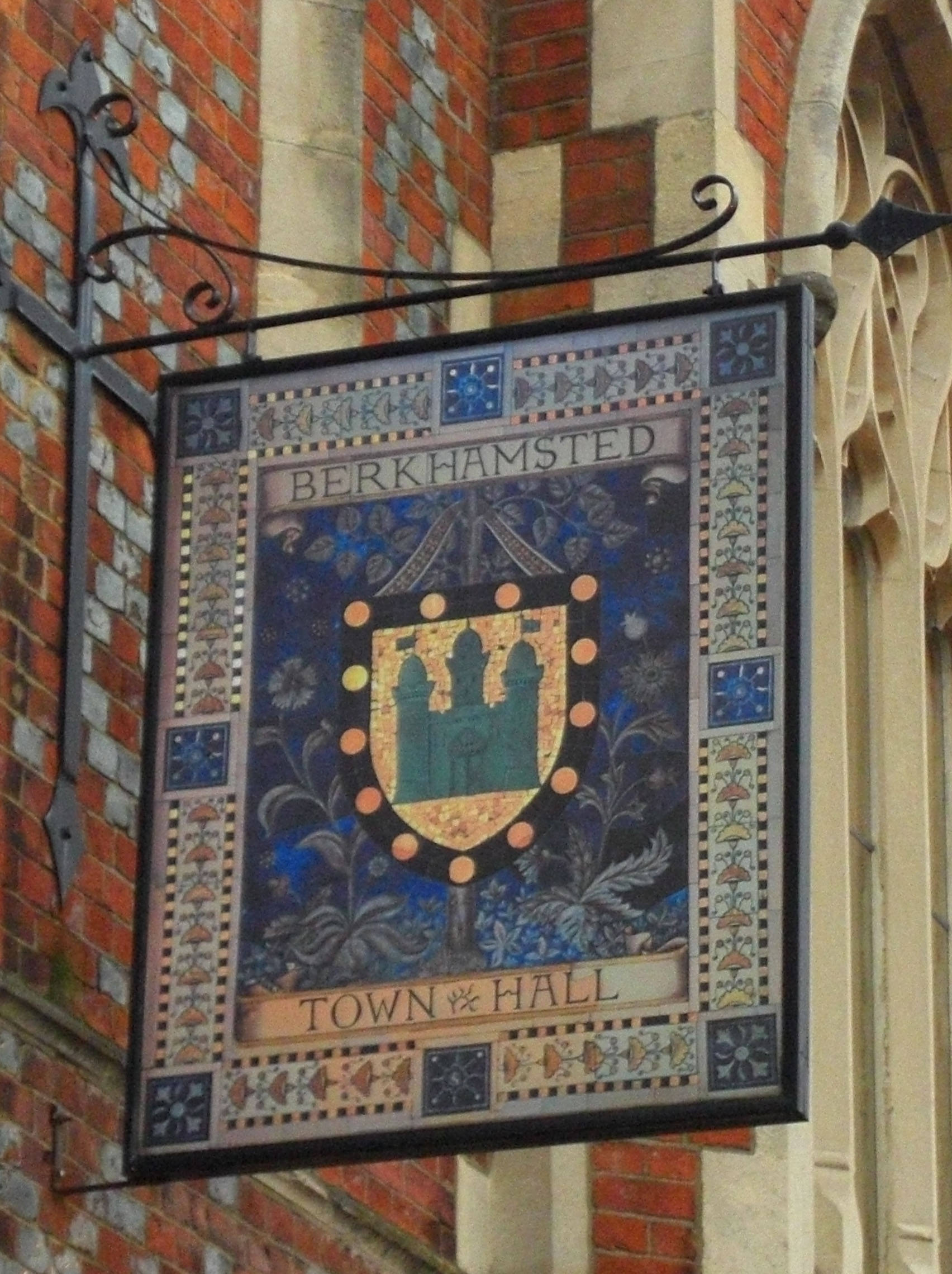
The town's coat of arms, an Escutcheon or shield with a castle of three towers each domed Azure flying from the two outer towers a banner Argent charged with a cross Gules all within a bordure Sable bezanty. The border is derived from the arms of the Duchy of Cornwall, as Berkhamsted Castle was part of that estate from the beginning under Richard Earl of Cornwall.

The coat of arms was granted to the Borough of Berkamsted St Peter by William Camden on 25 September 1618; it was transferred to the Berkamsted Town Council by King Charles III on 13 May 2024 and are described as: "escutcheon or a castle of three domed towers Azure the portcullis raised or flying from each outer tower a banner Argent charged with a cross Gules all within a bordure Sable charged with fifteen bezants."

== Demography ==
=== Employment and economic wellbeing ===
In 2011, 76% of Berkhamsted residents between the ages of 16 and 74 were employed (of which: full-time, 43%; part-time, 13%; self-employed, 14%); and 24% economically inactive (retired, 13%; long-term sick/disabled, 2%).

In mid-2016, the Office for National Statistics estimated the following figures:

- Working age population of Berkhamsted (males and females aged 16 to 64) as 11,400, i.e. 62% of the town's population
- Employment: 17.5% worked as managers, directors and senior officials; 27.5% professional occupations and 8.5% in associate professional and technical occupations; 10% were employed in administrative and secretarial occupations; 7% in skilled trades; 6% caring, leisure and other service occupations; 5% were in sales and customer service occupations; 3% were in process, plant and machine operatives; and 5.5% worked in elementary occupations.

=== Homes ===
Of the 7,363 households in Berkhamsted in 2011, 72% of homes were owner-occupied (34% were owned outright and 38% owned with a mortgage), compared to 63% for England; 26.5% of homes were rented (13% each for social and private) compared to a national figure of 34.5%.

In 2021, according to Rightmove, the average cost of a home in Berkhamsted was £696,949. The majority of sales in the town were detached properties, with an average selling value of £1,076,244. The average terraced dwelling price was £563,291 and the average semi-detached properties went for £657,436. Overall, in 2021, property house prices in Berkhamsted were 4% up on the previous year and 5% up on the 2018 peak of £661,336.

=== Diversity ===
From the 2021 census for the Berkhamsted built-up area, the following statistics were measured:

- Population: recorded at 21,245, with a near equal number of males and females
- Ethnicity: White individuals make up approximately 93–94% of the population, with Asian (~2–2.5%), Black (~0.6–0.7%) and mixed/multiple (~2–3%) being modest minorities
- Religion: 46.5% of the population of Berkhamsted identify as Christian; other faiths included 0.52% Buddhist, 0.49% Jewish, 0.64% Muslim, 0.68% Hindu, 0.17% Sikh and other religions 0.47%. The remaining 9,179 residents reported no religion.

== Transport ==
=== Railway ===
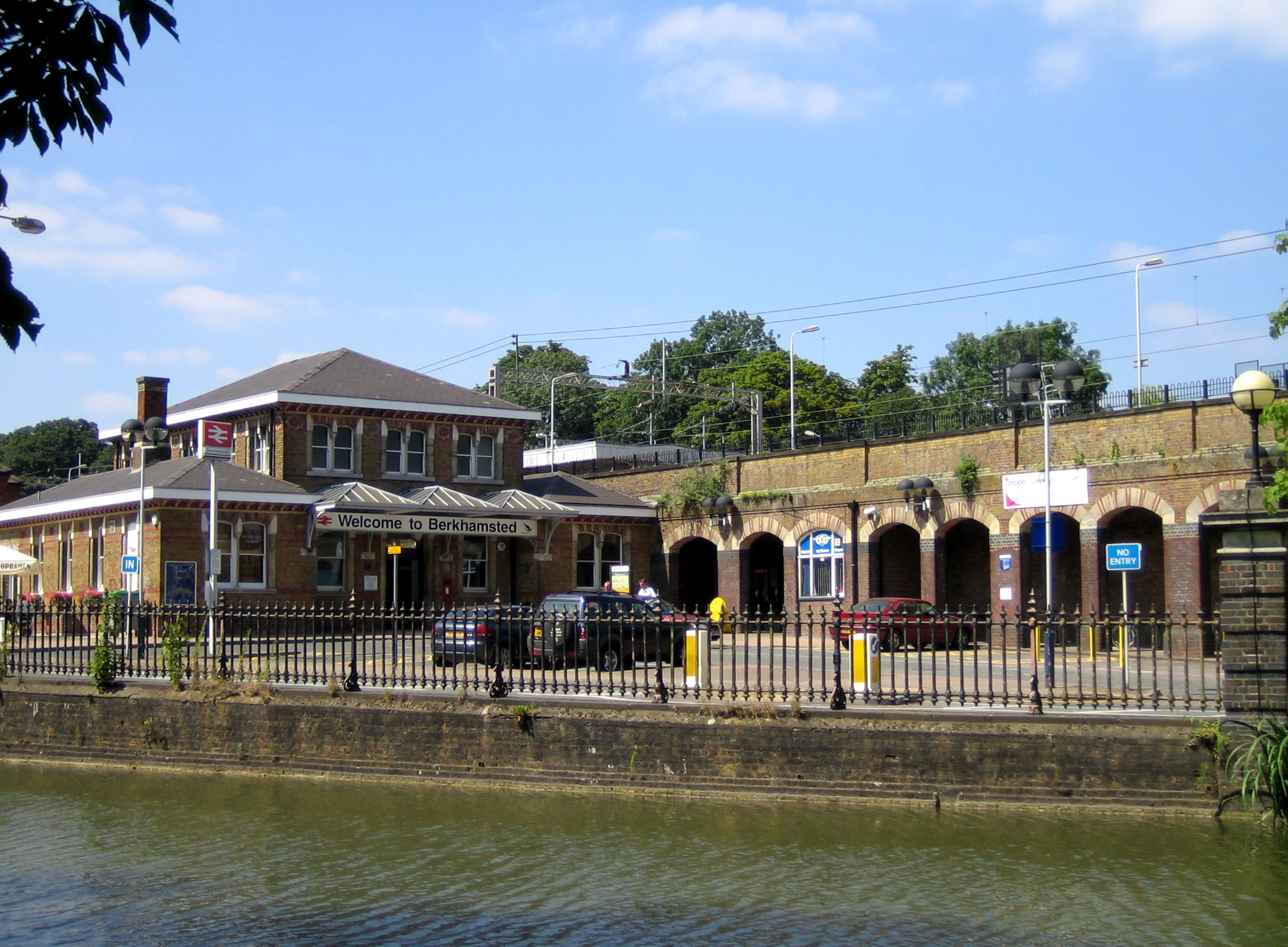
The station, sited next to the Grand Union Canal

Berkhamsted railway station is located just beside Berkhamsted Castle, overlooking the Grand Junction Canal. The station lies 28 miles (45 km) north-west of London Euston on the West Coast Main Line. Services are operated by London Northwestern Railway, on a route between London Euston, Tring and Milton Keynes Central.

=== Buses ===
Local bus routes are operated by Red Eagle and Red Rose Travel, which connect the town with Aylesbury, Hemel Hempstead, Luton, Watford and Whipsnade Zoo.

Since 1999, the county's bus network has been overseen by Hertfordshire County Council's Intalink transport partnership.

=== Road ===
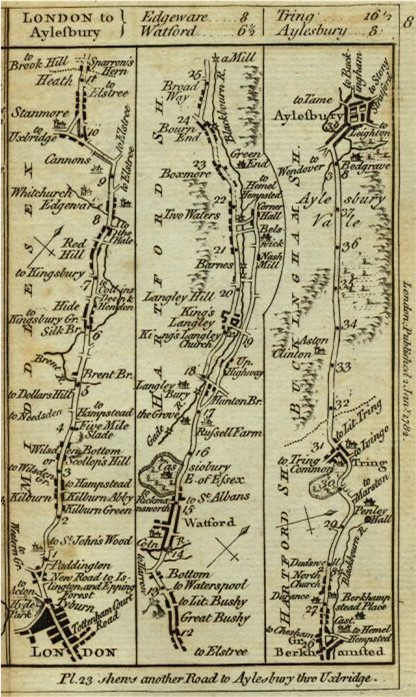
A strip map showing Berkhamsted on the route of the Sparrows Herne turnpike.

Originally proposed in the 1930s, a bypass was opened in 1993 to relive town traffic and the main A41 road now passes south-west of Berkhamsted.

== Economy ==
In 1986, farming, service and light industry were characteristic local employers. In 2015, schools and retail (predominantly Waitrose) were the town's largest employers; these are both situated in Berkhamsted Castle ward. Of the employed residents living in both Berkhamsted and Tring, 35% live and work in the towns, while 65% commute to workplaces away from the towns, particularly to London. Of the 7,100 people who work in Berkhamsted, 58% commute into the town. In 2011, 9.5% of Berkhamsted residents (aged 16 to 74 in employment) worked mainly at or from home; 52% drove to work by car (2.5% as a passenger in a car); 22% travelled by public transport; and 13% cycled or walked to work. In 2011, an average commute to work was around 13 miles (21 km).

In 2014, Berkhamsted's High Street had full retail occupancy of independent traders and a "cafe culture". Coming top in the south-east region in Sunday Times 2018 Best Places to Live, Berkhamsted was described as "affluent and attractive; its medieval centre is filled with chic shops and great places to eat", with 76% of shops being independent stores. Berkhamsted has an active Transition Town community.

== Education ==
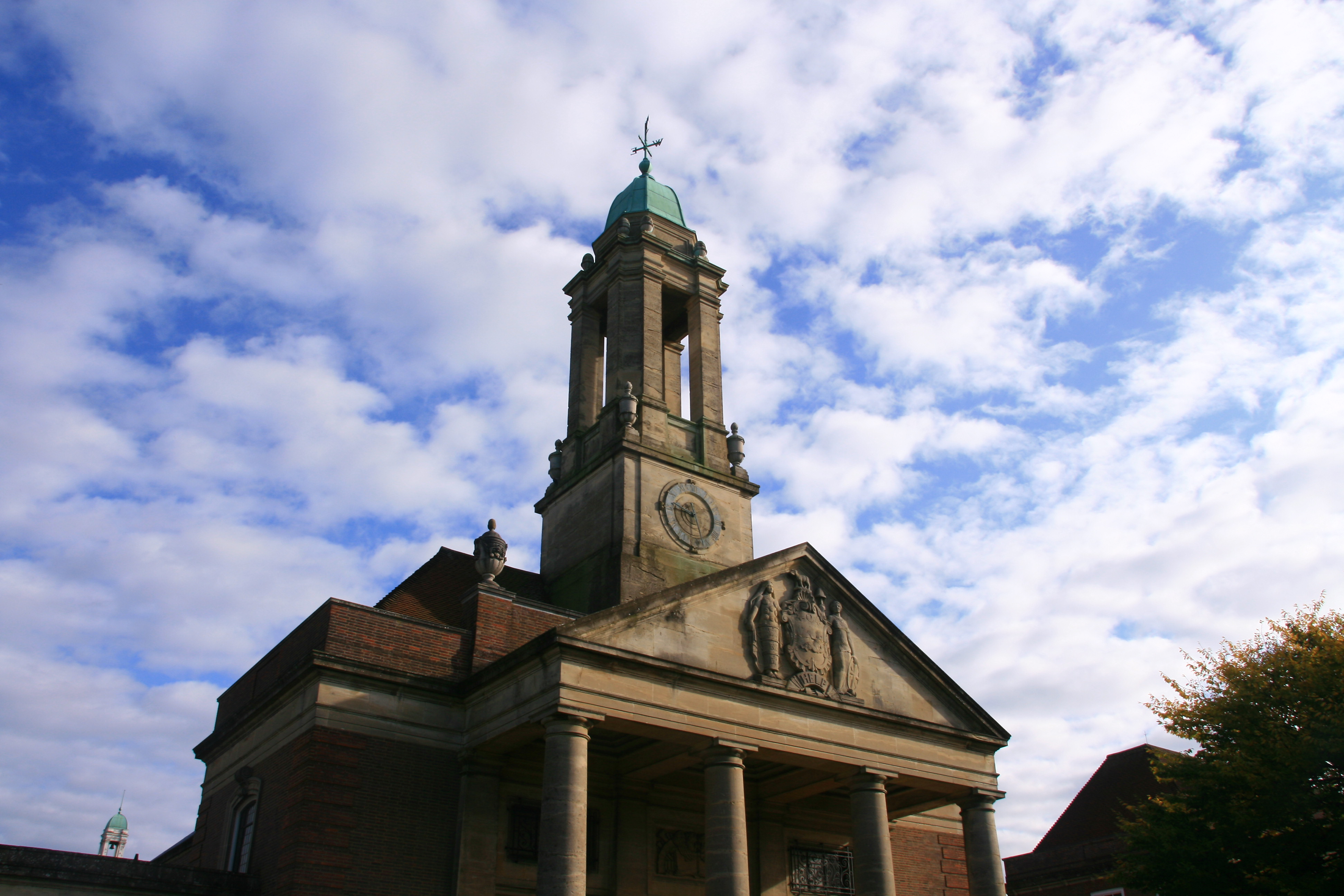
The Neoclassical portico of Ashlyns School (1935) bearing the Foundling Hospital coat of arms

State schools in Berkhamsted provide education in a two-tier system. Elementary education is offered by the seven primary schools in the town: Bridgewater Primary School, Greenway Primary & Nursery School, St Mary's Church of England Primary School, St. Thomas More Catholic Primary School, Swing Gate Infant School and Nursery, Thomas Coram Church of England Primary School, and Westfield Primary School and Nursery.

Ashlyns School is a Foundation school and sixth form with 1,200 mixed pupils aged 11 to 19 years. The school was begun in the 18th century, when a philanthropist, Thomas Coram, was granted a royal charter "for the Maintenance and Education of Exposed and Deserted Children" in 1739. The school is located in a Grade II listed building and is an example of neo-Georgian architecture.Since 2003, Ashlyns School building and its chapel have been a Grade II listed building.

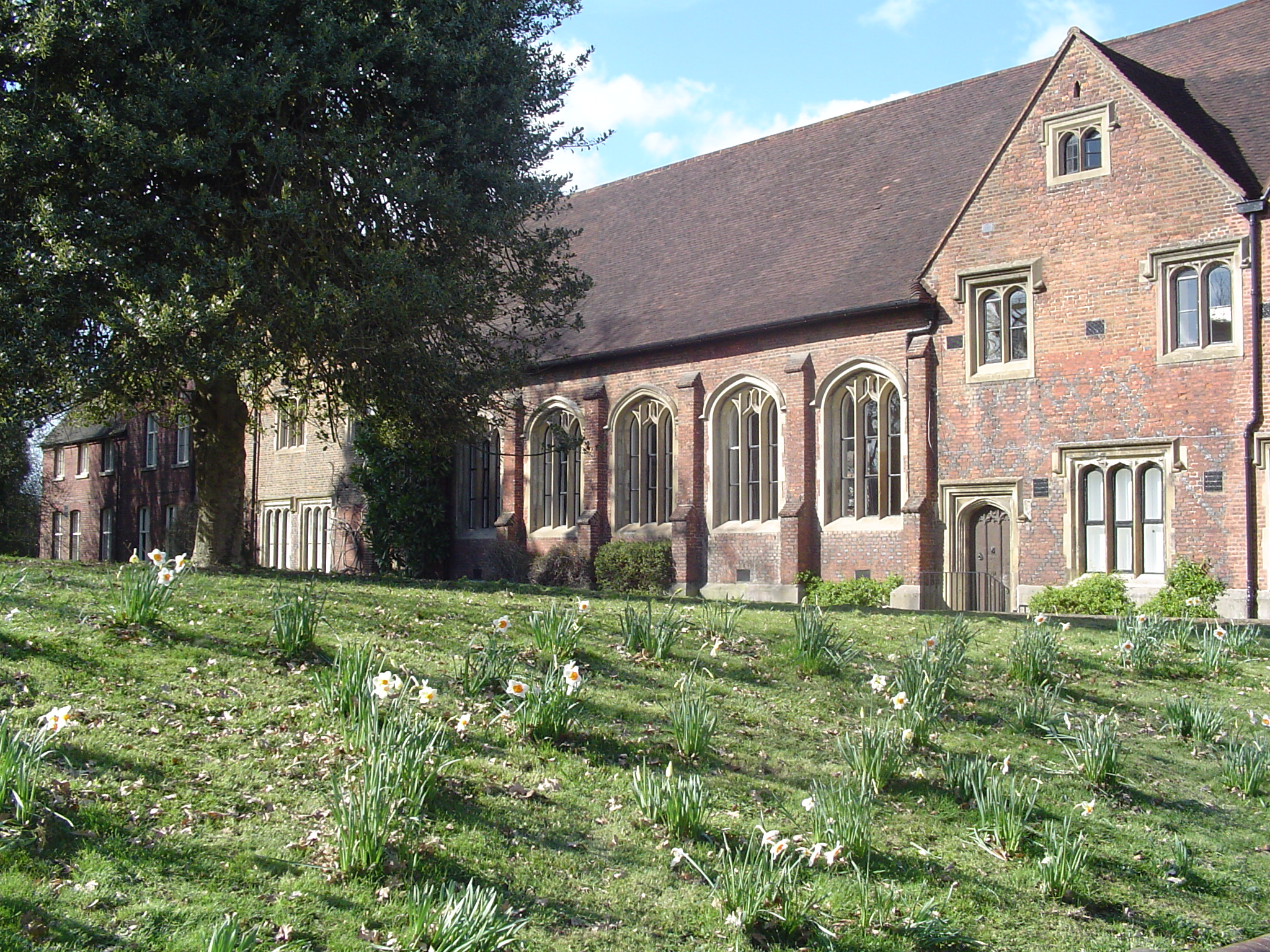
The Grade I Listed Berkhamsted School Old Hall, described by William Camden as "the only structure in Berkhamsted worth a second glance."

Primary and secondary education is also provided by two independent schools:

- Berkhamsted School, a private fee-paying school for around 1,850 pupils aged 3 to 18. The present school was formed in 1997 by the amalgamation of the original Berkhamsted School, founded in 1541 by John Incent, Dean of St Paul's Cathedral, Berkhamsted School for Girls, established in 1888, and Berkhamsted Preparatory School.
- Egerton Rothesay School is a small independent fee-paying school for around 150 Special Educational Needs (SEN) pupils between the ages of 5 and 19. The school was formed by the merger of two independent primary schools: Rothesay, founded in 1922 and situated in Charles Street, and Egerton School, founded in 1950.

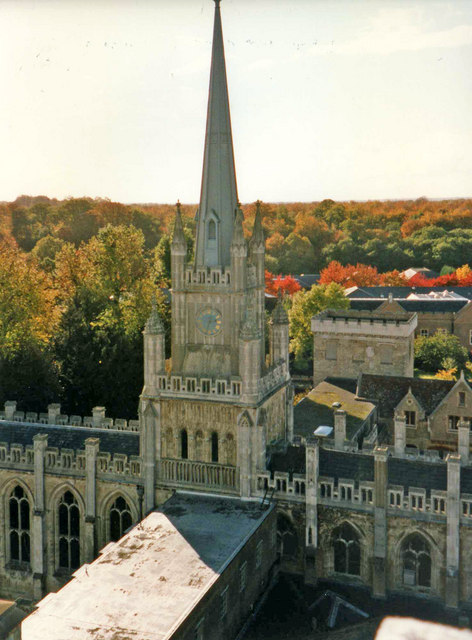
Spire of chapel at the Grade I Ashridge House, with the estate behind

Hult Ashridge (formerly Ashridge Business School/Ashridge Executive Education) is located in Ashridge House, the former stately home of the Duke of Bridgewater. In 2015, Ashridge merged with Hult International Business School, to become Hult Ashridge.

== Historic buildings ==
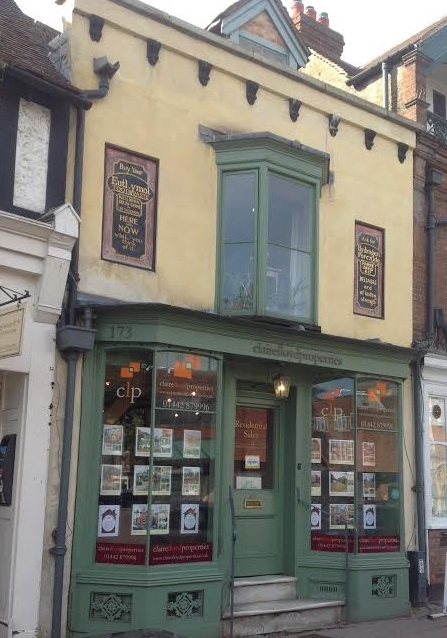
173 High Street, possibly the oldest jettied timber building in the UK

The majority of Berkhamsted's 85 listed or scheduled historical sites are half-timbered houses on the High Street; some are on Castle Street, which began as the medieval lane from the town's High Street to the drawbridge of the royal castle. At the other end of the lane was the parish church of St Peters. Berkhamsted school was founded in the 16th century while, in the 17th century, there were seven public houses among the street's trade outlets: four are scheduled, one is Grade I, seven are Grade II* and the remaining 75 are Grade II. To the north-west of Berkhamsted lie the ruins of Marlin's Chapel, a 13th-century chapel next to a medieval fortified farm. The walls and moat surrounding the modern farm still remain and are reputed to be haunted. 173 High Street is a Grade II* listed building, with a Victorian façade hiding what is considered to be the oldest extant jettied timber-framed building in Great Britain, dated by dendrochronology to between 1277 and 1297. The shop was restored on a £250,000 grant from English Heritage, and provides an insight into how the High Street would have looked in medieval times.

The Dean Incent's House at 129 High Street is a 15th-century timber-framed house which is reputed to be the birthplace of John Incent (c. 1480 – 1545), a dean in the Church of England who held office at St Paul's Cathedral from 1540 to 1545. 125 High Street, a house and shop, is a timber-framed building. This was an unusually large house, its size and central position suggesting a manor house or other high status house, possibly supporting the castle. The Swan, a pub at 139 High Street, contains the remains of a medieval open hall. The Court House, next to the church, dates from the 16th century, and is believed to lie on the site of the medieval court where the Portmote (Note: Also referred to as portmanmoot or portmoot. The name had Anglo-Saxon origins; the court had aspects both of court and of council meeting.) or Borough Court was held.

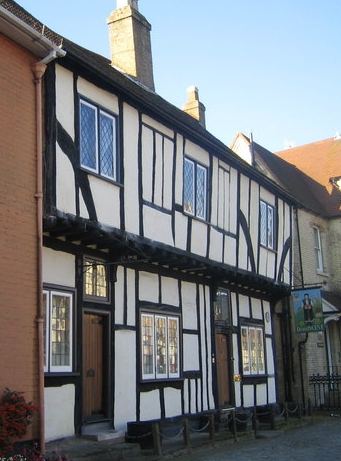
Dean Incent's House

Sayer's Almshouses, were the legacy of John Sayer, chief cook to Charles II, at 235–241 High Street, comprise a single-storey row of almshouses built in 1684. The Bourne School, at 222 High Street, was the legacy by Thomas Bourne (1656–1729) (Master of the Company of Framework Knitters) to build a charity school in Berkhamsted for 20 boys and 10 girls. The front was rebuilt in 1854 in Jacobean-style red brick. The site now occupied by the Pennyfarthing Hotel dates from the 16th century, having been a monastic building used as accommodation for religious guests passing through Berkhamsted or going to the monastery at Ashridge. Berkhamsted Town Hall, a Victorian gothic market house and town hall, was built in 1859. When Berkhamsted became part of the new Dacorum Borough Council (based in Hemel Hempstead) plans to demolish the building were stopped in the 1970s and 1980s by a citizens' campaign, through the High Court.

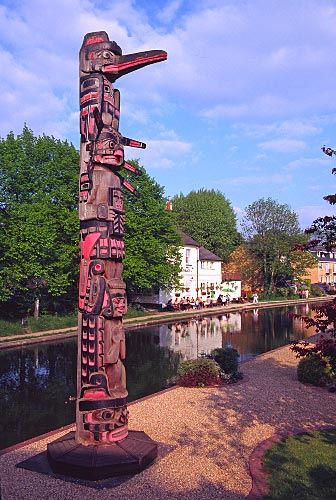
The totem pole at Berkhamsted

The Berkhamsted Canadian totem pole stands next to the canal, near Castle Street Bridge. In the early 1960s, Roger Alsford, a great-grandson of the founder of the timber company, James Alsford (1841–1912), went to work at the Tahsis lumber mill on Vancouver Island. During a strike, he was rescued from starvation by a local Kwakiutl community. Alsford's brother, William John Alsford, visited the island, and in gratitude for the local people's hospitality, commissioned a totem pole from the Canadian First Nations artist Henry Hunt. The western red cedar pole, 30 feet (9 m) high and 3 feet (1 m) in diameter, was carved by Hunt at Thunderbird Park, a centre for First Nation monuments. The completed pole was shipped to Britain and erected at Alsford's Wharf in 1968. It is one of only a handful of totem poles in the United Kingdom, others being on display at the British Museum and Horniman Museum in London, Windsor Great Park, Bushy Park and the Yorkshire Sculpture Park. The carvings on the totem pole represent four figures from First Nations legend: at the top sits Raven, the trickster and creator deity; he sits on the head of Sunman, who has outstretched arms representing the rays of the sun and wears a copper (a type of ceremonial shield); Sunman stands on the fearsome witch-spirit Dzunukwa; at the base is the two-headed warrior sea serpent, Sisiutl, who has up-stretched wings.

Ashridge is a country estate and stately home with a large Gothic Revival country house built between 1808 and 1814. The surrounding country estate is a 5,000 acres (2,000 ha) park managed by the National Trust; it has been used as a film location for Sleepy Hollow and Harry Potter and the Goblet of Fire. A monument to Francis Egerton, 3rd Duke of Bridgewater, a tall Doric column with urn (a Grade II* listed building), stands in a grove within Ashridge.

== Religion ==
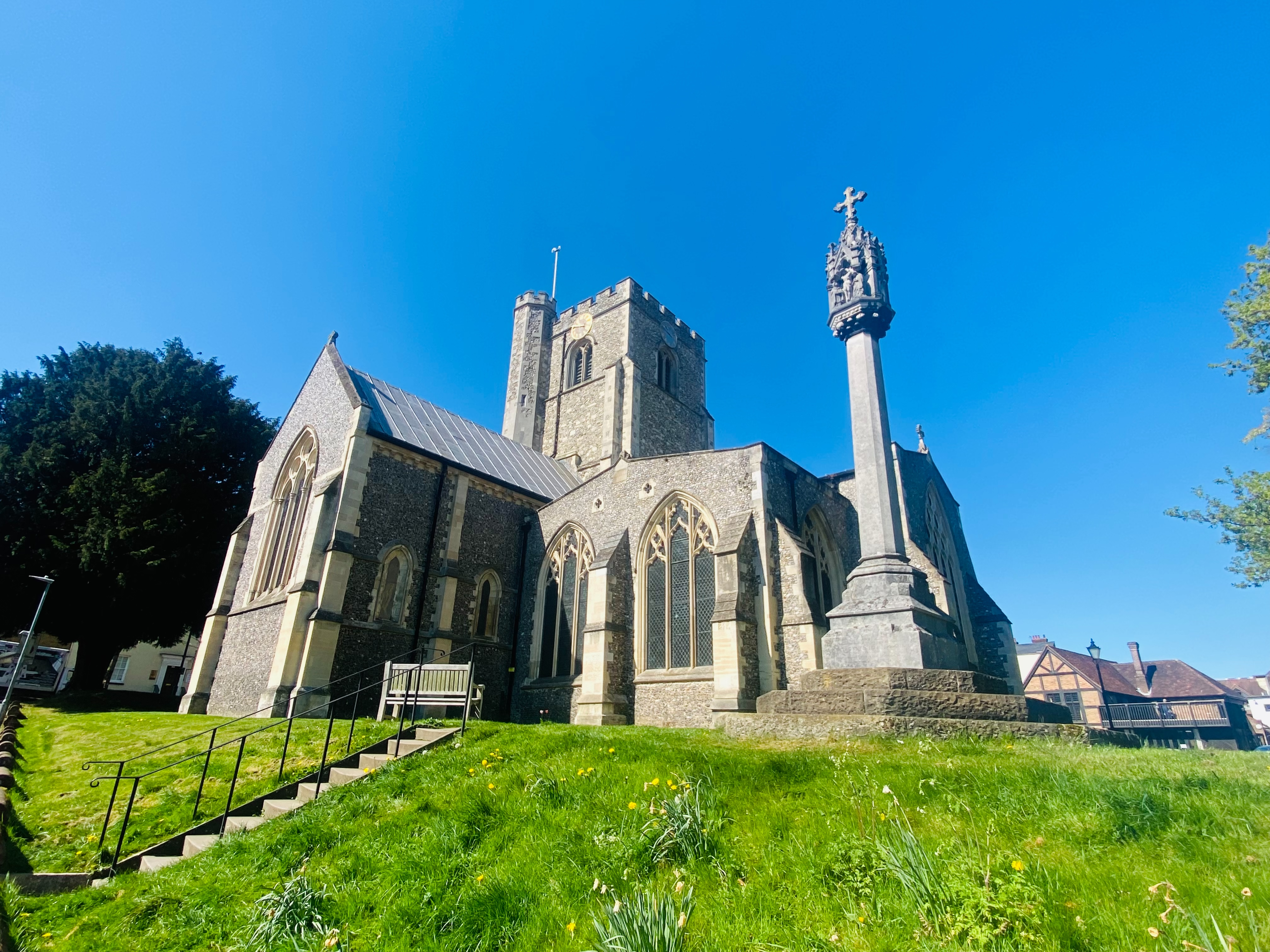
The Anglican Parish Church of St Peter's, established in the 13th century

The oldest extant church locally is St Mary's in the adjacent village of Northchurch. Between 1087 and 1104, there is reference to a chaplain called Godfrey and to a chapel of St James with parochial status within St Mary's Berkhamsted parish. A chapel situated close to St John's Lane was the base for a small community of monks, the Brotherhood of St John the Baptist, in the 11th and 12th centuries. (Note: For many centuries, the Berkhamsted town fair was held on the feast day of St James the Greater rather than on Petertide, which suggests that an older parish church before St Peter's was built in the 13th century.)

During King John's reign, Geoffrey Fitz Peter, was instrumental in the foundation of the parish church of St Peter, and in 1222, Robert de Tuardo was registered as the first known rector. Because of the church's proximity to the castle, the reigning monarch was patron of Berkhamsted rectors for several centuries. In 1648, during the English Civil War, St Peter's Church was requisitioned by General Fairfax as a military prison to hold soldiers captured at the siege of Colchester. The poet William Cowper was christened in St Peter's, where his father John Cowper was rector.

The parish church of St Peter, on the High Street, is one of the largest churches in Hertfordshire. Two other Anglican churches in the town are St Michael and All Angels (Sunnyside) (original building 1886) and All Saints' Church & St Martha's (built in 1906) on Rectory Lane.

Several other Christian denominations are represented in Berkhamsted:

- The Baptist community has a chapel on the High Street.
- A Quaker meeting house was opened in 1818 on the High Street.
- The Congregationlists worship together with a Presbyterian congregation at St Andrew's United Reformed Church on the corner of Castle Street and Chapel Street.
- The Methodists share All Saints' Church with Anglicans.
- The Evangelists began life as part of the Plymouth Brethren; their Hope Hall opened in 1875, which was renamed Kings Road Evangelical Church in 1969.
- A Roman Catholic church, the Church of the Sacred Heart, a modern church building dating from 1980, is located on Park Street.

== Culture ==
=== Literary connections ===
Geoffrey Chaucer was clerk of works at Berkhamsted Castle from 1389 and based his Doctor of Phisick in The Canterbury Tales on John of Gaddesden, who lived in nearby Little Gaddesden. William Cowper was born in Berkhamsted Rectory in 1731. Although he moved away when still a boy, there are frequent references to the town in his poems and letters. In the Victorian era, Cowper became a cult figure and Berkhamsted was a place of pilgrimage for his devotees. Maria Edgeworth, a prolific Anglo-Irish writer of adults' and children's literature who was a significant figure in the evolution of the novel in Europe, lived in Berkhamsted as a child in the 18th century. Between 1904 and 1907, the Llewelyn Davies boys were the inspiration for the author and playwright J.M. Barrie's Peter Pan. A little later, novelist Graham Greene was born in the town and was educated at Berkhamsted School, alongside literary contemporaries Claud Cockburn, Peter Quennell, Humphrey Trevelyan and Cecil Parrott.

=== Cinema ===
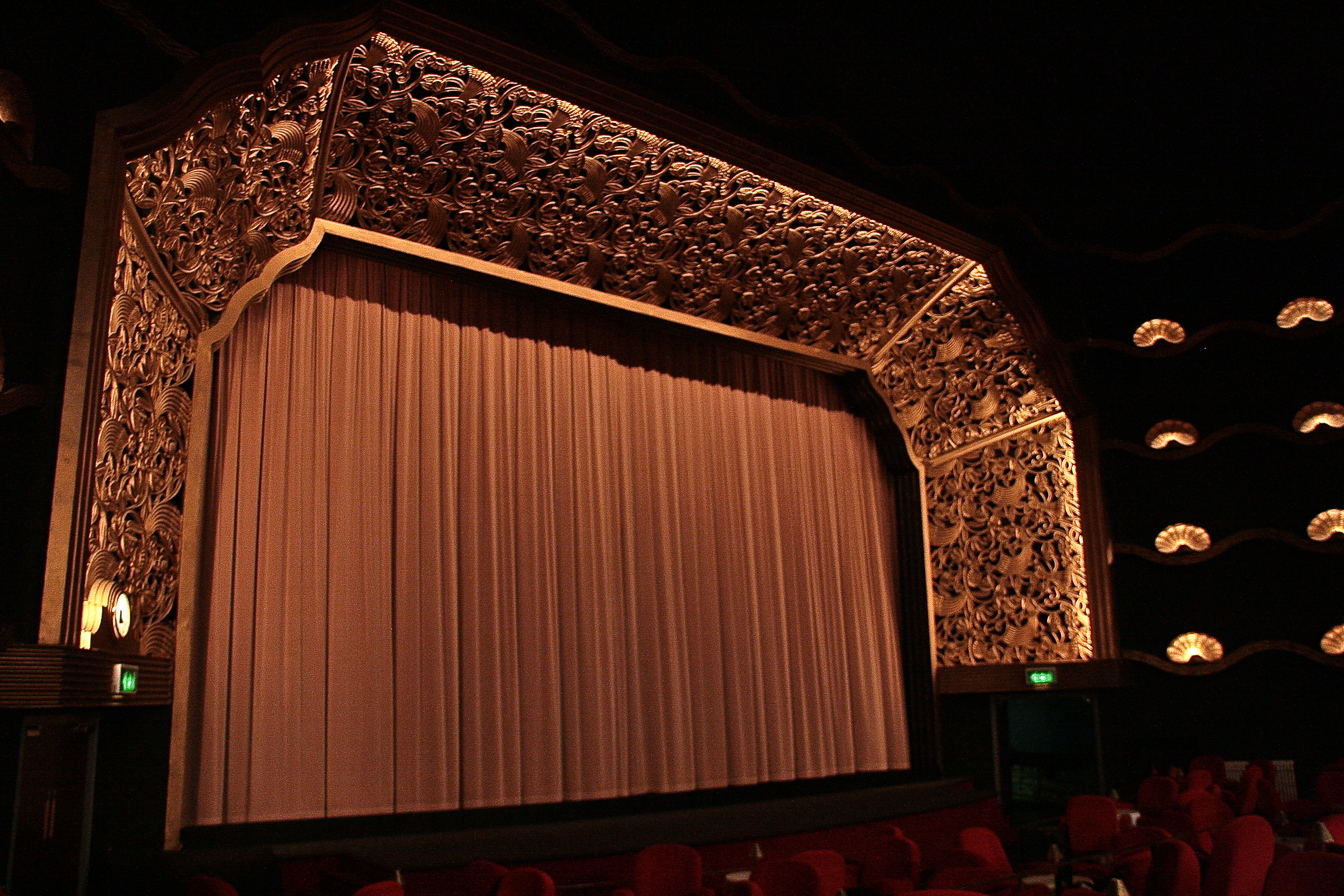
Interior of the Rex cinema

The Rex cinema, built in 1937, is recognised by English Heritage as a fine example of a 1930s art deco cinema. The cinema was designed by architect David Evelyn Nye for the Shipman and King circuit. Closed in 1988, the cinema was extensively restored in 2004 and has become a thriving independent local cinema. The cinema features luxurious seating and two licensed bars. Prior to the cinema's construction, an Elizabethan mansion, Egerton House, had occupied the site for 350 years.

=== BFI National Archive at King's Hill ===
Rarely open to the public, "The J. Paul Getty, Jr. Conservation Centre" is the location of much of the film restoration work of the National Archive of the British Film Institute. With over 275,000 feature, non-fiction and short films (dating from 1894) and 210,000 television programmes, it is one of the world's largest film archives. Two of the archive's collections were added to the United Nations Educational, Scientific and Cultural Organization (UNESCO) UK Memory of the World Register, in 2011.

== Leisure ==
The town has a large National Trust common and woodland on its long north-east edge. Running east–west through the centre of the town, along the town's length the Grand Union Canal provides an open space with recreational opportunities, with the small River Bulbourne it creates a wildlife corridor through the town.

Other public green spaces include the castle and Butts Meadow. In 2016, the Friends of St Peter's Berkhamsted received £907,000 in a grant from the National Lottery Heritage Fund and the Big Lottery Fund to repurpose the Rectory Lane Cemetery and for restored heritage features and create a new green community space in the town.

== Sport ==
- The Berkhamsted Bowmen is the oldest archery club in England.
- Founded in 1875, Berkhamsted Cricket Club competes in the Herts League and celebrated its 150th anniversary in 2025. The club is based at the Berkhamsted Community Cricket and Sports Club, at Kitcheners Field, Castle Hill.
- The nine Berkhamsted and Hemel Hempstead Hockey Club teams are based at their club grounds just outside the town at Cow Roast, playing their matches on their astroturf pitch.
- There are two bowls clubs: Berkhamsted and Kitcheners.
- Berkhamsted Football Club play in the Southern Football League Division One Central, part of the 8th level in the English League. The team was formed in 2009 after the demise of Berkhamsted Town F.C. which had been established in 1895. Founded in 1996, Berkhamsted Raiders CFC (Community Football Club) was recognised as the FA Charter Standard Community Club of the Year at the English Football Association Community Awards in 2014 and awarded the UEFA Grassroots Silver Award in 2015 for their work across the local community. In 2023, the club had more than 1,300 affiliated players (including 250 girls) in 94 youth teams plus Senior, Veterans, Ladies, Walking Football and Inclusive Football sections. In 2022, the club was awarded the Herts FA Grassroots Club of the Year.
- A sports centre near Douglas Gardens, comprises a large indoor multi-purpose sports hall, squash courts, a swimming pool and an outdoor all-weather pitch.
- The area has a variety of road cycling and mountain biking routes, including traffic-free off-road routes in Ashridge Estate.

== Media ==
Berkhamsted lies within the BBC London and ITV London region. Television signals are received from the Crystal Palace TV transmitter and the local relay transmitter situated in Hemel Hempstead.

Local radio stations are BBC Three Counties Radio on 103.8 FM serving Bedfordshire, Hertfordshire and Buckinghamshire, Heart Hertfordshire on 106.9 FM broadcasting across Hertfordshire, Greatest Hits Radio Bucks, Beds and Herts (formerly Mix 96.2) on 92.2 FM and community based stations, Radio Dacorum and Tring Radio.

The town is served by the regional newspaper, Hemel Hempstead Gazette & Express, which covers the towns of Hemel Hempstead, Berkhamsted and Tring.

== Notable people ==
- Poet and hymn writer William Cowper (1731–1800), one of the most popular poets of his time, was born and raised in Berkhamsted. Cowper changed the direction of 18th century nature poetry by writing of everyday life and scenes of the English countryside. Two stained-glass windows in St Peter's Church are dedicated to his memory.
- Novelist Graham Greene (1904–1991), whose father was headmaster of Berkhamsted School, which Greene attended. One of Greene's novels, The Human Factor, is set there and mentions several places in the town. In his autobiography, Greene wrote that he has been 'moulded in a special way through Berkhamsted'. Greene's life and works are celebrated annually with a festival organised by the Graham Greene Birthplace Trust.
- Sir Hugh Carleton Greene (1910–1987) was born and educated in Berkhamsted. Greene was a British television executive and journalist and brother of Graham Greene. He was director-general of the BBC from 1960 to 1969.
- Dame Esther Rantzen (1940–2026) is an English journalist and television presenter, who presented the BBC television series That's Life! for 21 years, from 1973 until 1994. Ranzen became Dame Commander of the Order of the British Empire in 2014 for services to children and older people through Childline and The Silver Line.
- Nick Owen (b.1947) is an English television presenter and News presenter, known for presenting the ITV breakfast programme Good Morning Britain, Good Morning with Anne and Nick, ITV Sport and the BBC's regional news show Midlands Today since 1997.

== Twin towns ==
Through Dacorum, Berkhamsted is twinned with:

- Beaune, Burgundy, France
- Neu-Isenburg, Hesse, Germany.
