= Egerton Rothesay School =

Location
- Durrants Lane; Berkhamsted, Hertfordshire, HP4 3UJ; United Kingdom; 51.76171°N 0.58864°W

Information
- Type: Independent
- Religious affiliation: Christian Ethos
- Opened: 1988 as ERS
- Founder: John Adkins
- Local authority: Pupils from 16 Local Authorities
- Specialist: Pupils requiring extra support at school, SEN, Confidence
- Department for Education URN: 117623 Tables
- Ofsted: Reports
- Head teacher: Allan Cairns
- Gender: Coeducational
- Age: 6 to 19
- Enrolment: c.150
- Houses: Plantagenet, Hanover, Tudor, Stuart
- Colours: Navy and Blue
- Publication: The Egerton
- Registered Charity No: 1091089
- Company No: 4301828
- Website: http://www.eger-roth.co.uk/

Egerton Rothesay School is an independent special education school located in Berkhamsted, Hertfordshire, United Kingdom.

== History ==
Egerton Rothesay School arose from the amalgamation of two Berkhamsted prep schools Rothesay, a pre-preparatory school founded in 1922 and situated in Charles Street, was bought in 1981. Three years later, Egerton School, founded in 1951 and located a few hundred yards along the same road, was purchased. The two amalgamated giving the school its current name.

In 1988 a purpose-built middle school, formerly Thomas Bourne Church of England Middle School, was purchased from Hertfordshire County Council and the former Rothesay School buildings were sold for development. The new school located on Durrants Lane was opened in September 1988 by the then Prime Minister, Rt Hon. Margaret Thatcher.

Initially a pure mainstream school ERS began to develop additional facilities for SEN education once on the new site. Development of specialist facilities and expertise followed along with the decision to become a school that was entirely focused on providing a superb education for the child who had some form of "additional, individual need". (This on the basis that the SEN description can so easily become merely a negative label which can impact both a child's self-esteem and their ability to develop strategies for learning to meet their particular need.)

The Junior School in Charles Street moved to a new building on the Durrants Lane site in January 2008, and the Charles Street premises were sold in 2009. Further development on the Durrants Lane site has included a 2-story classroom block with a large hall. Further buildings have been added for the 6th Form and Specialist Learning. In March 2020 it was rated as excellent in all areas by the Independent School Inspectorate.

== Achievements and recognition ==
The school specializes in supporting the education of children with Special Needs whilst following a mainstream curriculum. An ISI Inspection in March 2020 rated the school as excellent in all areas.

Open Days are usually held twice a term. However as the school is often over subscribed these depend on available space.
