= Berkhamsted Rural District =

History of Hertfordshire

Coordinates: 51.762°N 0.570°W

Berkhamsted Rural District Berkhampstead Rural District (1894–1937)
- Rural district
- Population
  - 1901: 4,708
  - 1971: 6,020
- History
  - Created: 28 December 1894
  - Abolished: 31 March 1974
  - Succeeded by: Dacorum
  - HQ: Berkhamsted
- Contained within
  - County Council: Hertfordshire

Berkhamsted Rural District was a rural district in Hertfordshire, England from 1894 to 1974, covering an area to the west of the county. Until 1937 the official spelling of the district's name was Berkhampstead Rural District.

== Evolution ==
Berkhampstead Poor Law Union had been created in 1835 following the Poor Law Amendment Act 1834. Under the Public Health Act 1872 sanitary districts were created, and the boards of guardians of poor law unions were made responsible for public health and local government for any part of their district not included in an urban authority. The Berkhampstead Rural Sanitary District therefore covered the area of the Berkhampstead Poor Law Union except for the town of Tring, which had a local board.

Under the Local Government Act 1894 (56 & 57 Vict. c. 73), rural sanitary districts became rural districts from 28 December 1894. The Act also directed that the new rural districts should be only in one county. Where rural sanitary districts straddled county boundaries, as Berkhampstead Rural Sanitary District did, they should be split into separate rural districts in each county, or otherwise boundary amendments should be made. Most of Berkhampstead Rural Sanitary District was in Hertfordshire, but it also included the parishes of Marsworth, Nettleden, and Pitstone in Buckinghamshire. Following discussion between Buckinghamshire and Hertfordshire County Councils, the Local Government Board agreed that Marsworth and Pitstone would join the Linslade Rural District, whilst Nettleden would be administered by the Berkhampstead Rural District from the outset, pending its formal transfer to Hertfordshire. On 30 September 1895, nine months after Berkhampstead Rural District was created, Nettleden was transferred from Buckinghamshire to Hertfordshire (along with part of Ivinghoe parish which was added to Nettleden at the same time) and thereafter the Berkhampstead Rural District was entirely in Hertfordshire.

The link with the poor law union continued, with all the elected councillors of the rural district council being ex officio members of the Berkhampstead Board of Guardians. The new district council held its first meeting on 31 December 1894 at the workhouse in Berkhamsted. Frederick Quincey Lane was appointed the first chairman of the council. He held the post until his death in 1907.

When first created, the Berkhampstead Rural District included the town of Berkhamsted (officially known as Great Berkhampstead at the time). An urban district was created for the town on 15 April 1898, when the parish of Great Berkhampstead was split into a Great Berkhampstead Rural parish, which remained in the Berkhampstead Rural District, and a Great Berkhampstead Urban parish, which became the Great Berkhampstead Urban District.

In 1937 the Great Berkhampstead Urban District Council formally changed the urban district's name to Berkhamsted Urban District, reflecting the more commonly used variant of the town's name. That change took effect on 19 July 1937. The Berkhampstead Rural District followed suit a few months later, formally becoming Berkhamsted Rural District on 1 November 1937.

== Parishes ==
Berkhamsted Rural District contained the following civil parishes.

Parish	From	To	Notes
Aldbury	28 Dec 1894	31 Mar 1974	
Great Berkhampstead	28 Dec 1894	14 Apr 1898	Parish split into urban and rural parishes on creation of Great Berkhampstead Urban District.
Great Berkhampstead Rural	15 Apr 1898	31 Mar 1937	Parish created as that part of the former Great Berkhampstead parish not within the urban district. Ceded land to urban district on 1 April 1935. Parish abolished 1937, split between Northchurch, Great Gaddesden, and Nettleden with Potten End.
Little Gaddesden	28 Dec 1894	31 Mar 1974	
Nettleden	28 Dec 1894	31 Mar 1937	In Buckinghamshire until 30 September 1895. Abolished 1937 to become part of new parish of Nettleden with Potten End.
Nettleden with Potten End	1 Apr 1937	31 Mar 1974	Created from former parish of Nettleden and parts of Great Berkhampstead Rural and Northchurch.
Northchurch	28 Dec 1894	31 Mar 1974	
Puttenham	28 Dec 1894	31 Mar 1964	Abolished to become part of Tring Rural.
Tring Rural	28 Dec 1894	31 Mar 1974	
Wigginton	28 Dec 1894	31 Mar 1974	

== Premises ==
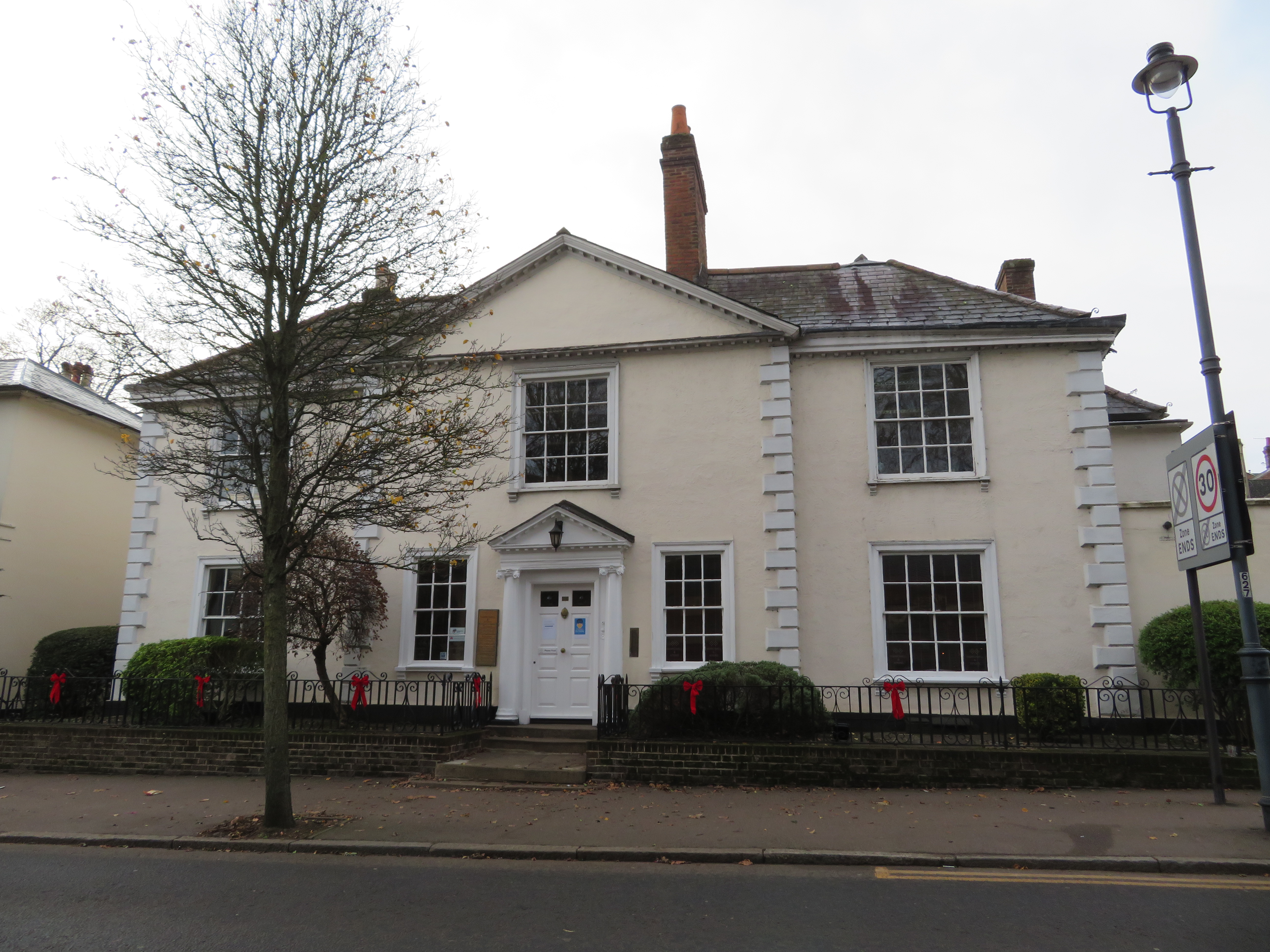
Boxwell House, 275 High Street, Berkhamsted: the council's offices 1960–1974.

For the first few years, Berkhamsted Rural District generally met at the board room in the workhouse in Berkhamsted, which was at the corner of High Street and Kitsbury Road. The old workhouse was demolished in the late 1930s. By 1928 the council was using as its offices 240 High Street, Berkhamsted (renumbered as 268 High Street around 1950), which was also the office of the solicitor who acted as clerk to the council. In 1960 the council moved to Boxwell House at 275 High Street in Berkhamsted, remaining there until the council's abolition in 1974.

== Abolition ==
Berkhamsted Rural District was abolished under the Local Government Act 1972, becoming part of the district of Dacorum on 1 April 1974.
