= Berkhamsted Town Hall =

Municipal building in Berkhamsted, Hertfordshire, England

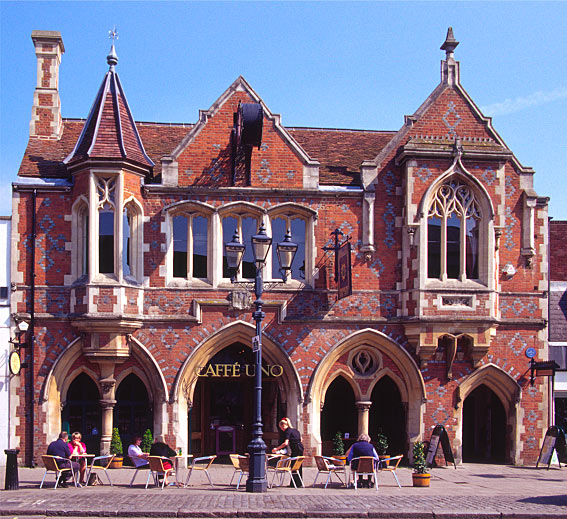
- Berkhamsted Town Hall

- Shown in Hertfordshire
- 51.7608°N 0.5647°W
- Location: High Street, Berkhamsted

History
- Built: 1859

Site notes
- Architect: Edward Buckton Lamb
- Architectural style: Gothic Revival style

Listed Building – Grade II
- Designated: 8 November 1972
- Reference no.: 1078138

Berkhamsted Town Hall is a Grade II listed municipal building in the High Street, Berkhamsted, Hertfordshire, England.

== History ==
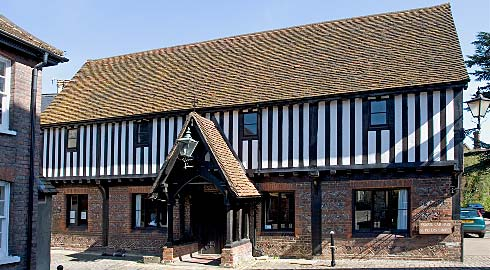
The 16th century former town hall known as the "Court House"

The current building was commissioned to replace a 16th century town hall in Church Lane which still stands and is now known as the "Court House". It was also intended to replace a Tudor market hall which had been located further east along the High Street and which had burnt down in 1854. Lady Marian Alford was closely involved in the initiative to establish the new town hall and a site was selected for the new building which had previously been occupied by the offices and stables of a firm of London carriers.

The new building, which was designed by Edward Buckton Lamb in the Gothic Revival style was financed by public subscription and completed in 1859. A substantial contribution to the cost was made by John Egerton-Cust, 2nd Earl Brownlow. The design involved a market hall on the ground floor, and a large assembly hall and rooms for the Mechanics' Institute on the first floor. On the first floor there was an octagonal turret with lancet windows and a spire on the left, a set of three two-light windows with a gable above in the centre, and a three-light ogee-shaped oriel window with tracery and a gable above on the right. A projecting clock was erected on the outside of the building, in memory of Thomas Read, a former town surveyor, in 1897.

The town hall served as the meeting place of Berkhamsted Parish Council until 1898, and the venue for hearings of the local magistrates' court until Berkhamsted Civic Centre was built on the south side of the High Street in 1938. During the Second World War the town experienced a surge in the size of the local population, and the town hall served as a British Restaurant providing meals for needy people, many of whom had been evacuated from London.

After the Second World War, the vacant building became derelict and, when Dacorum Borough Council was formed in Hemel Hempstead in 1974, the new council made proposals to demolish the building. These plans were stopped by a ten-year citizens' campaign, supported by local people Graham Greene, Richard Mabey and Antony Hopkins, during the late 1970s and early 1980s, which eventually ended at the High Court. The town hall was restored in the 1980s and the market hall on the ground floor was officially opened for commercial use as a shopping arcade by the actor Bernard Miles in December 1983. After the shopping arcade fell out of use, the market hall was converted for restaurant use in 1998, and after some years as "Cafe Uno" and then being re-branded as "Brasserie Chez Gérard" in 2007, it became "Carluccios" in 2012 and "the Copper House" in 2019. It re-opened again as Prime Steak & Grill in September 2023.

== Sources ==
- Hastie, Scot (1999). Berkhamsted, an Illustrated History. Kings Langley, UK: Alpine Press. ISBN 978-0-9528631-1-3.
