= Berkhamsted Civic Centre =

Municipal building in Berkhamsted, Hertfordshire, England

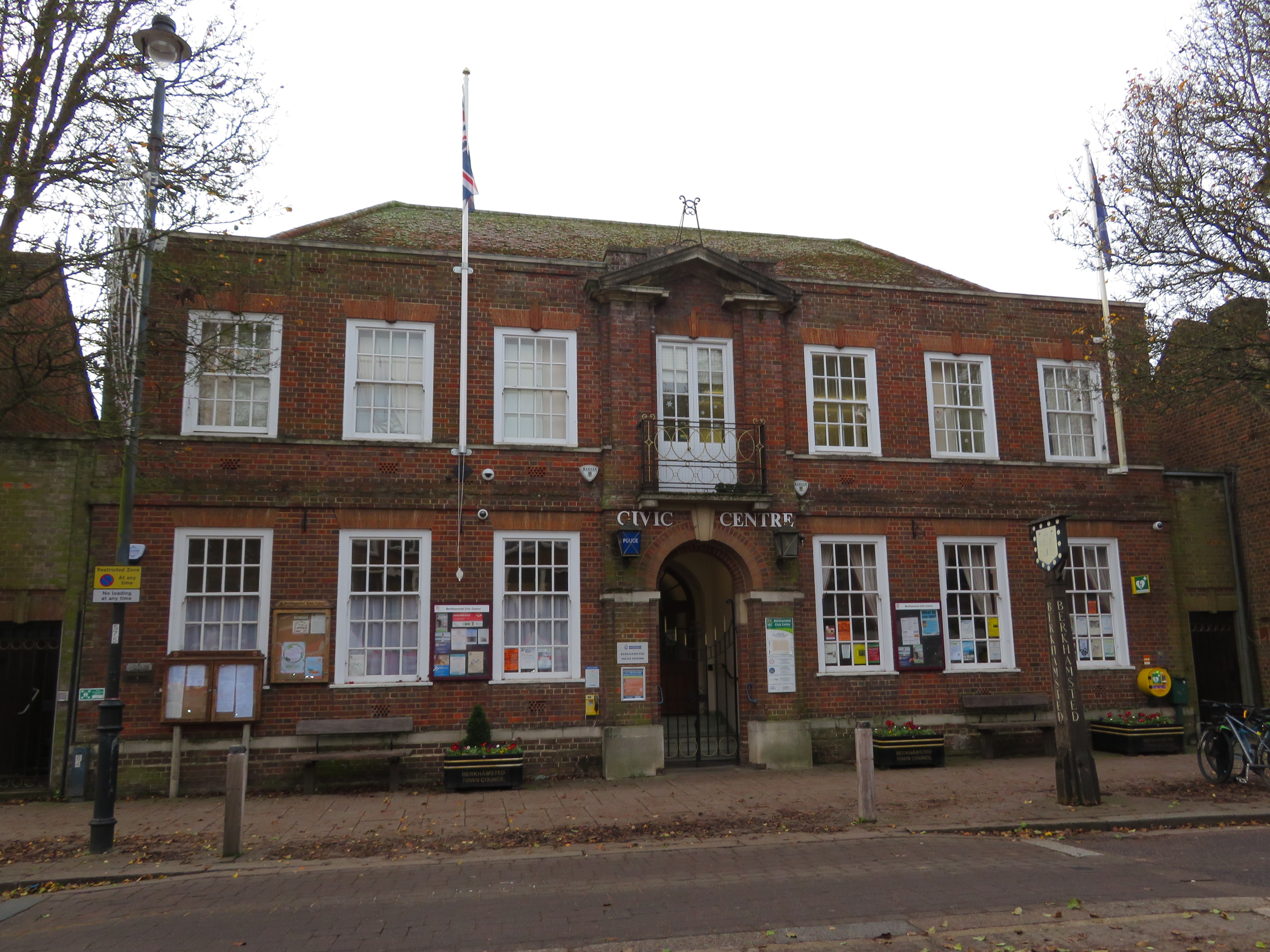
- Berkhamsted Civic Centre

- Shown in Hertfordshire
- 51.7601°N 0.5640°W
- Location: High Street, Berkhamsted

History
- Built: 1938

Site notes
- Architect: John Hadfield
- Architectural style: Neo-Georgian style

Berkhamsted Civic Centre is a municipal building in the High Street in Berkhamsted in Hertfordshire, England. The structure accommodates the offices and meeting place of Berkhamsted Town Council.

== History ==
In the 19th century, the main municipal building in the town was Berkhamsted Town Hall. After it was formed in 1898, Great Berkhampstead Urban District Council (as it was initially called) met in the local workhouse (on the corner of High Street and Kitsbury Road). In 1908 the council bought at auction the premises of a local building contractor, William Nash & Son, for the sum of £2,300. These premises comprised a house facing High Street, behind which was a former Wesleyan Chapel (by then used as a workshop), with a large yard and other outbuildings. These premises were converted to serve as the council's offices and meeting place, with the former chapel becoming the council chamber. In the early 1930s, after the council decided it needed more office space, it acquired the adjacent fishmonger's shop and demolished both buildings. The new civic centre was designed by the council surveyor, John Hadfield, in the Neo-Georgian style, built in red brick with stone dressings and was officially opened by the chairman of the council, Councillor Walter Pitkin, on 14 October 1938.

The design involved a symmetrical main frontage with seven bays facing onto the High Street; the central bay, which slightly projected forward, featured a round headed entrance with brick voussoirs, a keystone, wrought iron gates and a deeply recessed doorway inside. There was a wrought iron balconet and French door on the first floor, flanked by pilasters supporting an open pediment, while the other bays were fenestrated by sash windows on both floors. Internally, the principal rooms were a courtroom on the ground floor and a council meeting room on the first floor.

The council maintained garaging behind the civic centre for the local fire engines until 1969, when the fire service moved to Castle Street. The civic centre continued to serve as the local seat of government until the enlarged Dacorum Borough Council was formed in 1974. The courtroom was subsequently converted into an assembly hall and the council meeting room became the offices and meeting place of Berkhamsted Town Council. In the 1980s and 1990s, the civic centre was a significant events venue: the rock band, Marillion, performed their first concert there in 1980, the jazz singer, Elaine Delmar, performed there in 1986, and the American jazz tenor saxophonist, Scott Hamilton, took part in a BBC concert, which was broadcast from there, in 1998. Also, the Master of the Queen's Music, Malcolm Williamson, delivered at least one premiere of his works at the civic centre in the 1980s.

A wooden sign bearing the coat of arms of the town was presented by the Berkhamsted Citizens Association and erected on the pavement outside the civic centre in 1983. The garaging behind the civic centre, previously used by the fire service, was converted into a museum store for Dacorum Heritage in 1994.
