= Potten End =

Village in Hertfordshire, England

Coordinates: 51.77°N 0.53°W

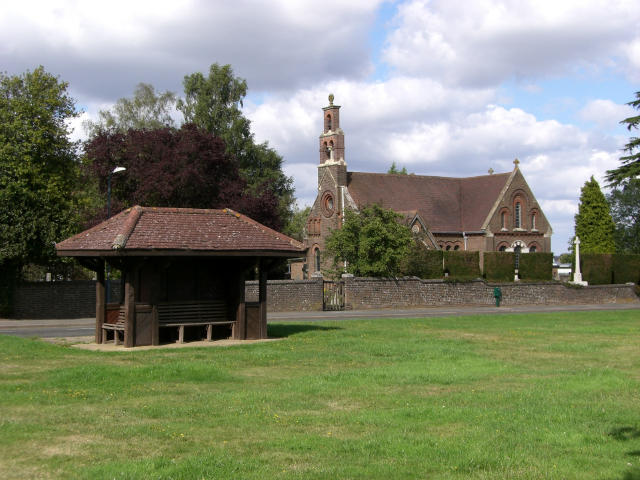
- Holy Trinity Church and Green, Potten End

- Location within Hertfordshire
- Population: 1,340
- OS grid reference: TL017089
- District: Dacorum
- Shire county: Hertfordshire
- Region: East
- Country: England
- Sovereign state: United Kingdom
- Post town: BERKHAMSTED
- Postcode district: HP4
- Dialling code: 01442
- Police: Hertfordshire
- Fire: Hertfordshire
- Ambulance: East of England
- UK Parliament: Harpenden and Berkhamsted

Potten End is a village in west Hertfordshire, England. It is located in the Chiltern Hills, two miles (3.2 km) east-north-east of Berkhamsted, three miles (4.8 km) north west of Hemel Hempstead and two miles south east of the National Trust estate of Ashridge. Nearby villages include Nettleden, Great Gaddesden and the hamlet of Frithsden. The village is part of the parish of Nettleden with Potten End within the borough of Dacorum.

== History ==
The ecclesiastical parish of Potten End was formed in 1894, but the village of Potten End straddled the civil parishes of Great Berkhampstead Rural and Northchurch until the parish of Nettleden with Potten End was created in 1937.

The village name derives from the earlier form "Pottern" which refers to a place where pots and pottery were made. "End" is an old term common in Hertfordshire defining any outlying settlement in a far corner of a parish or manor.

== Geography ==
Most of the village is situated on a plateau of land extending from Ashridge to the north and rising from the valleys of the River Gade to the east and from the River Bulbourne to the west. The green lies at a height of approximately 166 m (543 ft) above mean sea level. Consequently, all roads from Potten End lead downhill.

== Amenities ==
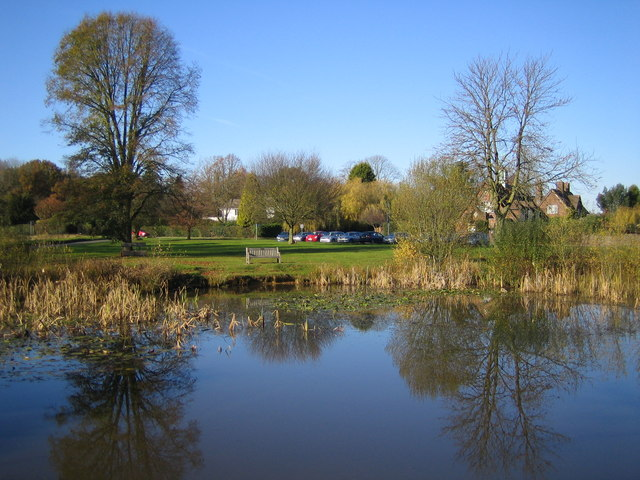
Martins Pond on Potten End village green

At the centre of the village there is a green and pond. The village largely comprises residential properties, together with Holy Trinity Church; a primary/junior school Potten End First School; a village store and coffee shop; and two public houses, Martins' Pond; and The Plough. A number of small businesses are also based in the village. Recreational facilities include cricket and football fields, bowls club and a children's grassed play area. A Village Hall provides community use for a wide variety of regular and special events.

There has been only minimal building development in the village in recent years and no immediate prospect of the surrounding farming land being given over to residential expansion. The Parish Council are keen to retain this status quo but are concerned that eventually the green belt will be lost by the growth of Hemel Hempstead where the gap is now down to little more than a mile from the boundary at Hempstead Lane.

Live Potten End weather information is available on the Potten End weather web site.

The long distance county footpath the Hertfordshire Way passes on the west side of the village.

Before its withdrawal in March 2024 public transport to/from the village comprised a bus service (no. 532) operating five return trips a day between Hemel Hempstead & Berkhamsted. In place of this there now operates a HertsLynx Dacorum mini-bus service. This is part of Hertfordshire County Council’s Demand Responsive Transport (DRT) service, and provides a flexible way to travel by bus. Passengers can pre-book a HertsLynx journey from a wide variety of pick up and drop off locations within the designated operating zone across the Dacorum area.

The nearest railway station is at Berkhamsted station, 2 miles distant. Frequent services operate from here to stations southbound to London Euston, and northbound to Tring and Milton Keynes, and less frequently to Northampton and Birmingham New Street. All these services are operated by London Northwestern Railway.

Following his retirement from professional cricket Fred Titmus and his wife Stephanie ran the post office and newsagent's shop in the village for 20 years. Subsequently, this facility transferred to the village shop but following a review by the post office, the sub post office counter was removed in 2008 despite a campaign to save it by the village and local MP.

== Open Day ==
Every two years on the last Sunday in June, the village hosts an Open Day, with special outdoor events and a number of private gardens open to the public. The last such event was held on 26 June 2011.

== Places of worship ==
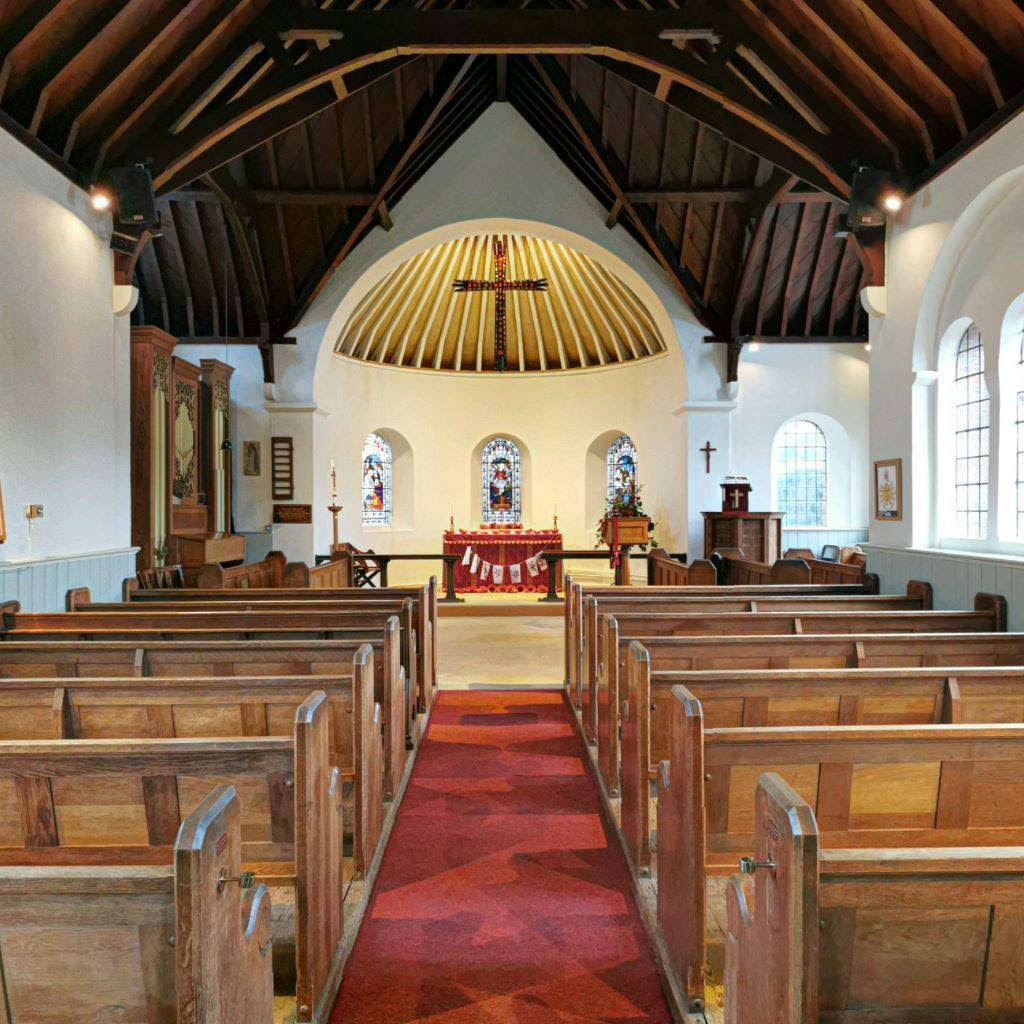
Interior of Holy Trinity, Potten End

The Anglican church of Holy Trinity was designed in an Italian Romanesque style by the architect Francis Penrose and consecrated in 1868. For its first thirty years operated as a Chapel of Ease to Berkhamsted St. Peter, before becoming the church of the newly created ecclesiastical parish of Potten End. In recent years the church has reformed links with St. Peter as part of the Berkhamsted Team Ministry. The parish lies within the Church of England Diocese of St. Albans.

The church has a graveyard within its boundaries and in 2006 an additional Parish Burial Ground was consecrated on an area of land down Hempstead Lane. The monthly church newsletter is delivered to every household in the village and in addition to the vicar's letter and church news also includes local news articles and reports of the recent parish council meetings.

A small baptist chapel (with small graveyard) also existed. This was on a site set back from the general frontage of properties on The Front. The chapel was closed and the building sold in 1997 and is now a private residence.
