= Nettleden =

Village in Hertfordshire, England

Coordinates: 51.77956°N 0.53737°W

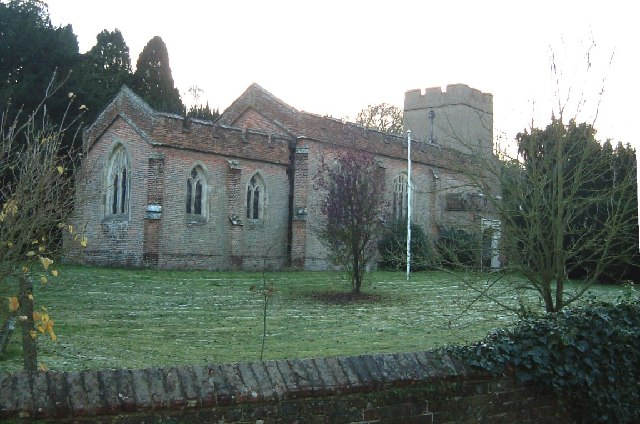
- Nettleden Church

- Location within Hertfordshire
- OS grid reference: TL0110
- Civil parish: Nettleden with Potten End
- District: Dacorum
- Shire county: Hertfordshire
- Region: East
- Country: England
- Sovereign state: United Kingdom
- Post town: Berkhamsted
- Postcode district: HP1
- Dialling code: 01442
- Police: Hertfordshire
- Fire: Hertfordshire
- Ambulance: East of England
- UK Parliament: Hemel Hempstead

Nettleden is a small village in the civil parish of Nettleden with Potten End, in the Dacorum borough of Hertfordshire, England. It is in the Chiltern Hills, about 4 miles (6 km) north-west of Hemel Hempstead, near Little Gaddesden, Great Gaddesden and Frithsden.

== Etymology ==
The village name of Nettleden is Anglo-Saxon in origin and means 'valley where nettles grow'. In manorial records of the late twelfth century the village was recorded as Neteleydene.

== History ==
Historically, Nettleden was a hamlet in the parish of Pitstone in Buckinghamshire, although the boundary of the hamlet was almost surrounded by the county of Hertfordshire. Nettleden was included in the Berkhamsted Poor Law Union from 1835. Parish functions under the poor laws were exercised separately for the hamlet of Nettleden and the rest of Pitstone parish. Nettleden therefore became a civil parish in 1866 when the legal definition of 'parish' was changed to be the areas used for administering the poor laws. When district councils were established in December 1894, Nettleden was included in the Berkhamsted Rural District, which was temporarily allowed to straddle Hertfordshire and Buckinghamshire pending Nettleden being transferred to Hertfordshire, which happened on 30 September 1895.

The church, St Lawrence, was first mentioned in 1285 when it became a part of the endowment of Ashridge Monastery. The church, except for the tower, was largely rebuilt in brick by John, Earl of Bridgewater, in 1811. Until 1895 it was a chapelry of Pitstone.

The hamlet of St Margaret's, formerly belonging to Ivinghoe in Buckinghamshire, was added to the parish of Nettleden in 1895 at the same time as the county boundary change. Here, Henry de Blois, bishop of Winchester, founded the nunnery of St Margaret's de Bosco. After the Dissolution in 1539, St Margaret's came into private hands. During the Second World War, St Margaret's Camp was a London County Council senior school for evacuee boys from London. The school closed one week after the end of the war in Europe, when all the boys were returned to their homes in London. Since 1984 it has been the Amaravati Buddhist Monastery.

On 1 April 1937 the civil parish of Nettleden was abolished, joining with parts of the parishes of Great Berkhampstead Rural and Northchurch to form a new parish called Nettleden with Potten End. At the 1931 census (the last before the abolition of the parish), Nettleden had a population of 133.

From Nettleden to Frithsden runs the Roman Road or Spooky Lane, named in reference to the ghost of an Ashridge monk. In the early 19th century, the lane was dug deeper into the hill, with high revetted walls on both sides, and a bridge was built over the lane, in order that people using the driveway leading to Ashridge did not meet the villagers. Another feature of Nettleden is the steep Pipers Hill to the east of the village.
