= Frithsden =

Hamlet in Hertfordshire, England

Coordinates: 51°46′40″N 00°31′40″W

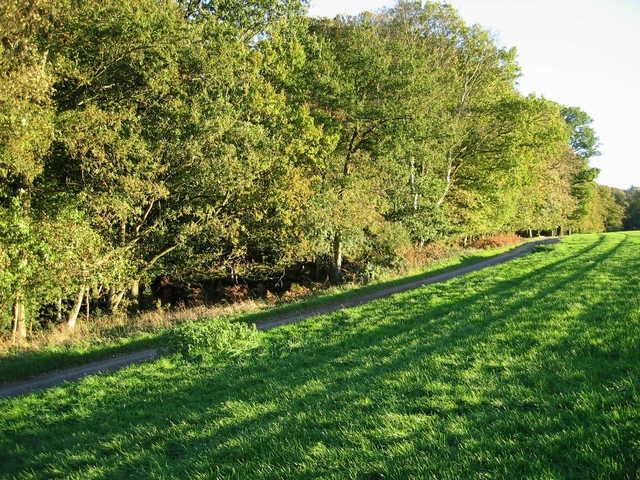
- Frithsden Beeches

- Location within Hertfordshire
- OS grid reference: TL015098
- District: Dacorum
- Shire county: Hertfordshire
- Region: East
- Country: England
- Sovereign state: United Kingdom
- Police: Hertfordshire
- Fire: Hertfordshire
- Ambulance: East of England
- UK Parliament: Hemel Hempstead

Frithsden /ˈfrɪzdən/ (locally pronounced 'Frizden') is a small hamlet in Hertfordshire, England. It sits in the Chiltern Hills, about two miles north of the town of Berkhamsted, which it's part of. Administratively, it falls under the Dacorum district, specifically in the ward of Nettleden with Potten End.

The village name is derived from the wood le Fryth (me. frith »wood«). It is first mentioned 1291 as Frithesdene (»valley of the wood«).

West of the hamlet bordering to Ashridge Park are the Frithsden Beeches, a wood left to nature, with large beeches. Scenes for Sleepy Hollow, Jonathan Creek and Harry Potter and the Goblet of Fire have been filmed in this wood.

Frithsden, together with the neighbouring hamlets Nettleden and Potten End, is famous for its black cherries and the villagers hold in July their annual cherry fair. They also claim to have originated the Cherry Bounce and the Cherry Turnover. The village also had a winery, Frithsden Vineyard, but this closed in 2019.
