= Nettleden with Potten End =

Civil parish in Hertfordshire, England

Coordinates: 51.77011°N 0.52733°W

- Location within Hertfordshire
- Population: 1,546 (2011 census)
- OS grid reference: TL017090
- Civil parish: Nettleden with Potten End
- District: Dacorum
- Shire county: Hertfordshire
- Region: East
- Country: England
- Sovereign state: United Kingdom

Nettleden with Potten End is a civil parish in Hertfordshire, England, covering the villages of Potten End and Nettleden and the surrounding rural area.

The parish of Nettleden with Potten End was created on 1 April 1937 from the former parish of Nettleden and parts of the parishes of Great Berkhampstead Rural and Northchurch. The village of Potten End had previously straddled Great Berkhampstead Rural and Northchurch parishes. From its creation, the parish of Nettleden with Potten End was included in the Berkhamsted Rural District until that district was abolished in 1974 to become part of Dacorum.

Nettleden with Potten End parish council generally meets at the Church Room in Potten End, the larger of the two villages.
