= Grade II* listed buildings in Dacorum =

There are over 20,000 Grade II* listed buildings in England. This page is a list of these buildings in the district of Dacorum in Hertfordshire.

== Dacorum ==
Name	Location	Type	Completed (Note: The date given is the date used by Historic England as significant for the initial building or that of an important part in the structure's description.)	Date designated	Grid ref. (Note: The grid reference is based on the British national grid reference system, sometimes known as OSGB36, used by the Ordnance Survey.) Geo-coordinates	Entry number (Note: The "List Entry Number" is a unique number assigned to each listed building and scheduled monument by Historic England.)	Image	Wikidata
Manor Cottage, the Old Manor House	Aldbury	House	1516	14 May 1952	SP9646812492; 51°48′10″N 0°36′08″W	1100624	Manor Cottage, the Old Manor House More images	Q17542482
The Bridgewater Monument	Moneybury Hill, Aldbury	Column	1831-2	14 May 1952	SP9701113118; 51°48′30″N 0°35′39″W	1078046	The Bridgewater Monument More images	Q15108035
Ash	Berkhamsted Place, Berkhamsted	House	Medieval	9 May 1973	SP9909108710; 51°46′06″N 0°33′55″W	1078166	Ash	Q17542375
Ashlyns Hall	Ashlyns Hall, Berkhamsted	House	Early 19th century	29 July 1950	SP9915606690; 51°45′01″N 0°33′54″W	1078164	Ashlyns Hall More images	Q17542362
Church of Saint Peter	Berkhamsted	Church	13th century	29 July 1950	SP9935907754; 51°45′35″N 0°33′42″W	1342174	Church of Saint Peter More images	Q5117681
Edgeworth House	Berkhamsted	House	Late 18th century	9 May 1973	SP9796408469; 51°45′59″N 0°34′54″W	1342141	Upload Photo	Q17542684
Great Barn at Castle Hill Farm	Berkhamsted	Barn	Probably 16th century	9 May 1973	SP9909108780; 51°46′08″N 0°33′55″W	1078167	Upload Photo	Q17542388
173 High Street	Berkhamsted	Workshop	Late 13th century	19 May 2001	SP9916307817; 51°45′37″N 0°33′53″W	1246942	173 High Street More images	Q17542609
Dean Incent's House	Berkhamsted	Timber Framed House	16th century	29 July 1950	SP9932007727; 51°45′34″N 0°33′45″W	1356570	Dean Incent's House More images	Q15978967
Church of St Lawrence	Bovingdon	Parish Church	Medieval	2 December 1986	TL0171703717; 51°43′23″N 0°31′44″W	1348432	Church of St Lawrence More images	Q17542785
Rent Street Barn	Bovingdon	Farmhouse	16th century	2 December 1986	TL0213003208; 51°43′06″N 0°31′23″W	1167711	Upload Photo	Q17542543
Street Farm	Bovingdon	Farmhouse	16th century	26 January 1967	TL0260203092; 51°43′02″N 0°30′58″W	1100478	Street Farm	Q17542470
The Manor House	The Common, Chipperfield	Farmhouse	Late Medieval	22 October 1952	TL0477201403; 51°42′06″N 0°29′07″W	1348423	The Manor House More images	Q17542768
Bonners	Pepperstock, Flamstead	Farmhouse	16th century	26 January 1967	TL0791816702; 51°50′19″N 0°26′06″W	1296461	Upload Photo	Q17542675
Cheverells and attached Stables	Cheverells Green, Flamstead	Country House	c. 1700	26 January 1967	TL0545115430; 51°49′39″N 0°28′16″W	1100372	Upload Photo	Q17542399
Gates, Gatepiers and Flanking Walls at Main Entrance to Park at Beechwood Park School	Beechwood Park, Flamstead	Gate	c. 1760	19 March 1987	TL0532514322; 51°49′03″N 0°28′24″W	1348457	Upload Photo	Q74824621
Hill Farm	Flamstead	Farmhouse	1740s	19 March 1987	TL0548314030; 51°48′54″N 0°28′16″W	1100384	Upload Photo	Q17542410
Saunders Almshouses	Flamstead	Almshouse	1669	22 October 1952	TL0783314611; 51°49′11″N 0°26′13″W	1348459	Saunders Almshouses More images	Q17542827
Oak Cottage	Flaunden	House	Late 15th century	21 June 1967	TL0161900840; 51°41′50″N 0°31′52″W	1348450	Upload Photo	Q17542816
Sharlowes Farm House	Flaunden	Farmhouse	c. 1500	26 January 1967	TL0155500877; 51°41′51″N 0°31′55″W	1100436	Upload Photo	Q17542452
Church Farmhouse and Stables	Great Gaddesden	Farmhouse	C15/C16	26 January 1967	TL0282611182; 51°47′23″N 0°30′38″W	1173686	Upload Photo	Q17542571
Eastern Barn at Church Farm, 50m south-east of Parish Church	Great Gaddesden	Courtyard	c. 1987	21 February 1978	TL0291511218; 51°47′25″N 0°30′33″W	1296091	Eastern Barn at Church Farm, 50m south-east of Parish Church	Q17542662
Gaddesden Hall	Water End, Great Gaddesden	Farmhouse	Late Medieval	22 October 1952	TL0430409597; 51°46′31″N 0°29′23″W	1101228	Gaddesden Hall More images	Q17542505
Gaddesden Place	Bridens Camp, Great Gaddesden	Villa	1768	22 October 1952	TL0382411083; 51°47′20″N 0°29′46″W	1101253	Gaddesden Place More images	Q5516314
Glebe House	Great Gaddesden	House	Late 16th century	26 January 1967	TL0273811126; 51°47′22″N 0°30′43″W	1173673	Glebe House More images	Q17542557
Moor Cottage	Water End, Great Gaddesden	House	Late 17th century	26 January 1967	TL0393510244; 51°46′52″N 0°29′41″W	1173712	Upload Photo	Q17542586
The Golden Parsonage and Garden Walls attached on North-east	Great Gaddesden	House	1705	22 October 1952	TL0506312536; 51°48′06″N 0°28′40″W	1101260	The Golden Parsonage and Garden Walls attached on North-east More images	Q14949356
The Hoo	Great Gaddesden	House	c. 1683	26 January 1967	TL0365612775; 51°48′14″N 0°29′53″W	1348057	The Hoo More images	Q17542755
Church of All Saints	Kings Langley	Church Hall	1976	26 January 1967	TL0733502493; 51°42′39″N 0°26′52″W	1100442	Church of All Saints More images	Q17542461
Langley House	Kings Langley	House	Late 16th century	22 October 1952	TL0719902536; 51°42′41″N 0°26′59″W	1100412	Upload Photo	Q17542440
Priory Remains (now part of the new School) and attached Buildings	Kings Langley	House	18th century	22 October 1952	TL0647702700; 51°42′47″N 0°27′37″W	1348439	Priory Remains (now part of the new School) and attached Buildings	Q17542797
Sunbury Hill Farm	Kings Langley	Farmhouse	Late 15th century	26 January 1967	TL0627001501; 51°42′08″N 0°27′49″W	1295908	Sunbury Hill Farm More images	Q17542651
John of Gaddesden's House	Little Gaddesden	House	Late 17th century	14 May 1952	SP9929213401; 51°48′38″N 0°33′40″W	1100427	Upload Photo	Q17871264
The Manor House and No 55	Little Gaddesden	House	1576	14 May 1952	SP9933213506; 51°48′41″N 0°33′38″W	1100390	Upload Photo	Q17542426
Cell Park	Markyate	Country House	1539-40	22 October 1952	TL0588217246; 51°50′38″N 0°27′52″W	1173939	Cell Park More images	Q17542598
Church of St John the Baptist	Markyate	Chapel of Ease	1734	26 January 1967	TL0588716898; 51°50′26″N 0°27′52″W	1101241	Church of St John the Baptist More images	Q17542533
Amersfort, with Forecourt Walls, and linked Terraces and Loggia on South East	Potten End	House	1911	19 March 1987	TL0102908575; 51°46′00″N 0°32′15″W	1101220	Amersfort, with Forecourt Walls, and linked Terraces and Loggia on South East	Q17542496
Church of St Lawrence	Nettleden	Chapel of Ease	c. 1470	30 November 1966	TL0199910474; 51°47′01″N 0°31′22″W	1101192	Church of St Lawrence More images	Q17542487
84–96 High Street	Northchurch	Timber Framed House	15th century OR 16th century	29 July 1950	SP9742508774; 51°46′09″N 0°35′22″W	1295556	84–96 High Street More images	Q17542342
The Clock House	Tring Park, Tring	School	1986	21 September 1951	SP9258911186; 51°47′30″N 0°39′32″W	1077999	Upload Photo	Q17542242
The Mansion (the Arts Educational Schools)	Tring Park, Tring	Country House	c1682-3	29 May 1981	SP9267911189; 51°47′30″N 0°39′27″W	1342226	The Mansion (the Arts Educational Schools) More images	Q2453454
Barn adjoining on North Chapel Farmhouse	Wilstone	House	Early 18th century	23 April 1985	SP9043513780; 51°48′55″N 0°41′22″W	1342230	Upload Photo	Q17542733
Tower of the Old Church of All Saints	Long Marston	Tower	15th century	30 November 1966	SP8942515611; 51°49′55″N 0°42′13″W	1078012	Tower of the Old Church of All Saints More images	Q17542258
Church of St Bartholomew (Church of England)	Wigginton	Church	1973	30 November 1966	SP9404810316; 51°47′01″N 0°38′17″W	1077986	Church of St Bartholomew (Church of England) More images	Q17542235
Charter Tower	Hemel Hempstead	Manor House	16th century	18 June 1948	TL0547807715; 51°45′30″N 0°28′23″W	1262943	Charter Tower More images	Q17542632
Little Marchmont, Marchmont House	Piccotts End	Country House	Late 18th century	18 June 1948	TL0528808612; 51°45′59″N 0°28′32″W	1078042	Little Marchmont, Marchmont House More images	Q17542267
Lockers	Bury Hill, Hemel Hempstead	Country House	16th century	18 June 1948	TL0503807552; 51°45′25″N 0°28′47″W	1078118	Lockers	Q17542331
Northend Cottage	Leverstock Green	Timber Framed House	16th century or early 17th century	17 February 1977	TL0846806455; 51°44′47″N 0°25′49″W	1078114	Northend Cottage	Q17542324
Nos 6 and 8, Queensway: Wrought Iron Front Railings	Hemel Hempstead	House	Late 18th century	18 June 1948	TL0553707633; 51°45′27″N 0°28′20″W	1251119	Nos 6 and 8, Queensway: Wrought Iron Front Railings More images	Q17542619
Old Marlowes House	Hemel Hempstead	House	18th century	18 June 1948	TL0554907314; 51°45′16″N 0°28′20″W	1372609	Old Marlowes House More images	Q17542848
Snatchup End Cottages	Apsley	House	1898	17 February 1977	TL0611105035; 51°44′02″N 0°27′53″W	1078070	Snatchup End Cottages More images	Q17542301
The Bury	Hemel Hempstead	House	Late 18th century	18 June 1948	TL0544007648; 51°45′27″N 0°28′25″W	1262960	The Bury More images	Q17542641
The King's Arms Public House	Hemel Hempstead	Public House	17th century	18 June 1948	TL0558007819; 51°45′33″N 0°28′18″W	1342190	The King's Arms Public House More images	Q17542706
The Old Bell Public House	Hemel Hempstead	Inn	1603	18 June 1948	TL0557007844; 51°45′34″N 0°28′18″W	1078086	The Old Bell Public House More images	Q17542311
Three Gables	Hemel Hempstead	House	Early 17th century	18 June 1948	TL0562206140; 51°44′38″N 0°28′18″W	1342168	Three Gables More images	Q17542697
80 High Street	Hemel Hempstead	House	18th century	20 December 1976	TL0548407954; 51°45′37″N 0°28′23″W	1078059	80 High Street	Q17542286
109 High Street	Hemel Hempstead	House	Early 19th century	18 June 1948	TL0550907977; 51°45′38″N 0°28′22″W	1342194	109 High Street	Q17542717
Fernery, attached wall to west and steps to south, Ashridge	Little Gaddesden	Fernery	1864	26 March 2019	SP9933212031; 51°47′53″N 0°33′39″W	1462796	Fernery, attached wall to west and steps to south, Ashridge	Q66480081
