= Saunders Almshouses =

Historic building in Hertfordshire

Coordinates: 51°49′11″N 0°26′13″W

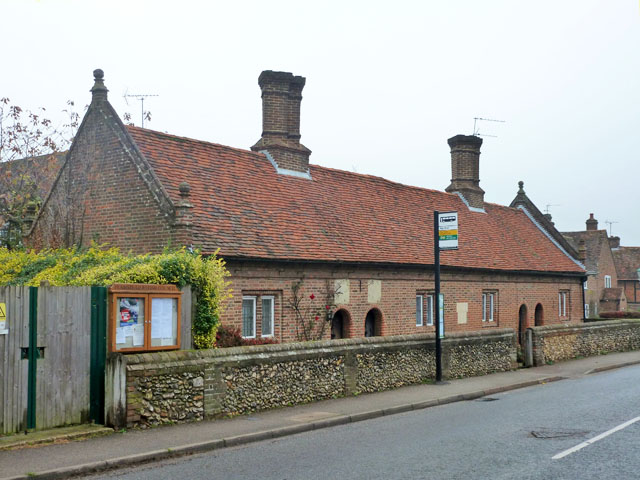
Saunders Almshouses

The Saunders Almshouses are Grade II* listed almshouses in Flamstead, Hertfordshire, England. They date from 1669 and were built for Thomas Saunders of Beechwood Park.
