= St Margaret's Convent, Hertfordshire =

Medieval English convent

Coordinates: 51.795681°N 0.529177°W

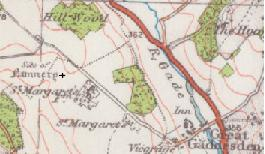
Location of St Margarets Nunnery on the 1932 Ordnance Survey Map.

St Margaret's Convent was a convent of the Benedictine order near Great Gaddesden in Hertfordshire, England. Founded in 1160, it was abolished as a consequence of King Henry VIII's dissolution of the monasteries in the 1530s. It was also known as The Priory of Ivinghoe, St. Margaret's, in the Wood and Muresley Priory.

It was founded by Henry de Blois, Bishop of Winchester. Some accounts point to an earlier foundation by Thomas Becket before 1129. It therefore predated the nearby Ashridge Priory. In 1280 King Edward I gave lands in Surrey to the convent, but it was always known for its poverty.

Names of some of the prioresses survive, from Isoda, elected in 1250, to Margaret Hardwick, in place at the time of closure under the first Act of Suppression of 1535, when the convent had five nuns, and an annual income of £18 8s 9d. It was sold to Sir John Dauncey in 1538, along with the Manor of Muresley. It changed hands over the centuries, finally passing to the Earls of Bridgewater and Lord Brownlow in 1823.

The buildings are described as being of Totternhoe stone with mullioned windows, square mouldings and trefoil-headed stained glass windows. The structure survived as a manor house until at least 1802, but had been almost completely demolished by 1862.

Several place names persist from the convent, including St Margaret's Lane and Farm; and the district north-west of Great Gaddesden is still known as St Margaret's.

The modern Buddhist monastery of Thai Forest Tradition, Amaravati Buddhist Monastery is situated only a quarter of a mile from the site.
