= 130–136 Piccotts End =

Medieval timber framed building in Piccotts End in Hertfordshire, England

Piccotts End
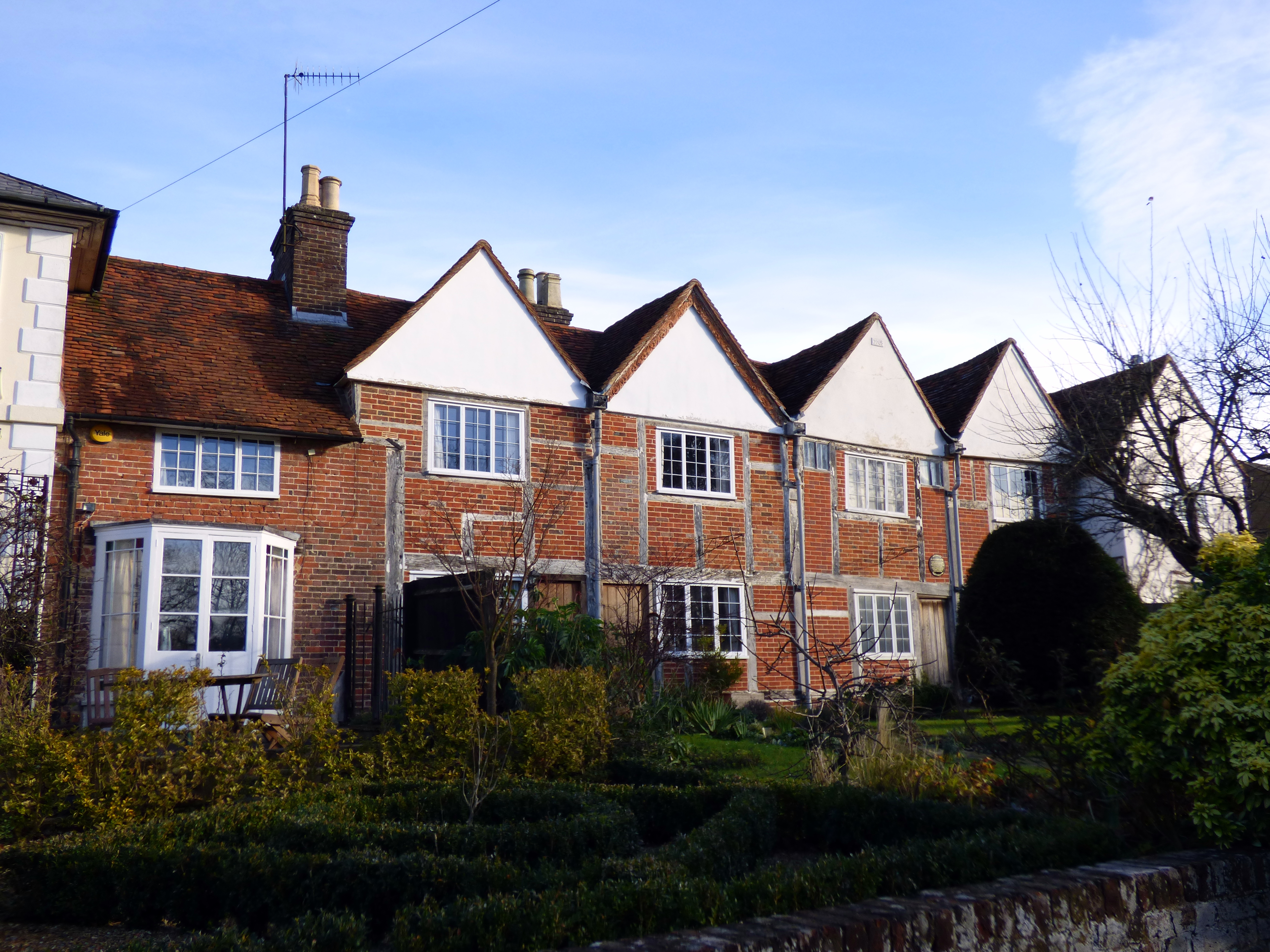
- 130–136 Piccotts End

- Location within Hertfordshire

General information
- Type: Hall house converted to cottages
- Architectural style: Tudor
- Location: Piccotts End, near Hemel Hempstead, Hertfordshire, 130–136 Piccotts End, Hemel Hempstead, HP1 3AU, United Kingdom
- Coordinates: 51.770871°N 0.4779387°W

Technical details
- Structural system: Timber frame
- Material: Oak, red brick and whitewashed plaster
- Floor count: 2

Design and construction
- Designations: listed Grade I
- Known for: 15th-century religious wall paintings

Website
- piccottsendpaintings.uk

130–136 Piccotts End is a medieval timber framed building in Piccotts End in Hertfordshire, England. Originally a hall house, the structure has been divided into a row of cottages. Two of the cottages are of interest for the art they contain. Important 15th-century murals were discovered, at 132, in 1953 and the entire building was listed Grade I the following year. Later murals have been recorded at 134.

== Location ==
Piccotts End is a village in the north of the parish of Hemel Hempstead. The original function of the building is not known. It has been suggested that the building was connected with Ashridge Priory, which was the home of religious community from the thirteenth to the sixteenth century.

== Murals ==
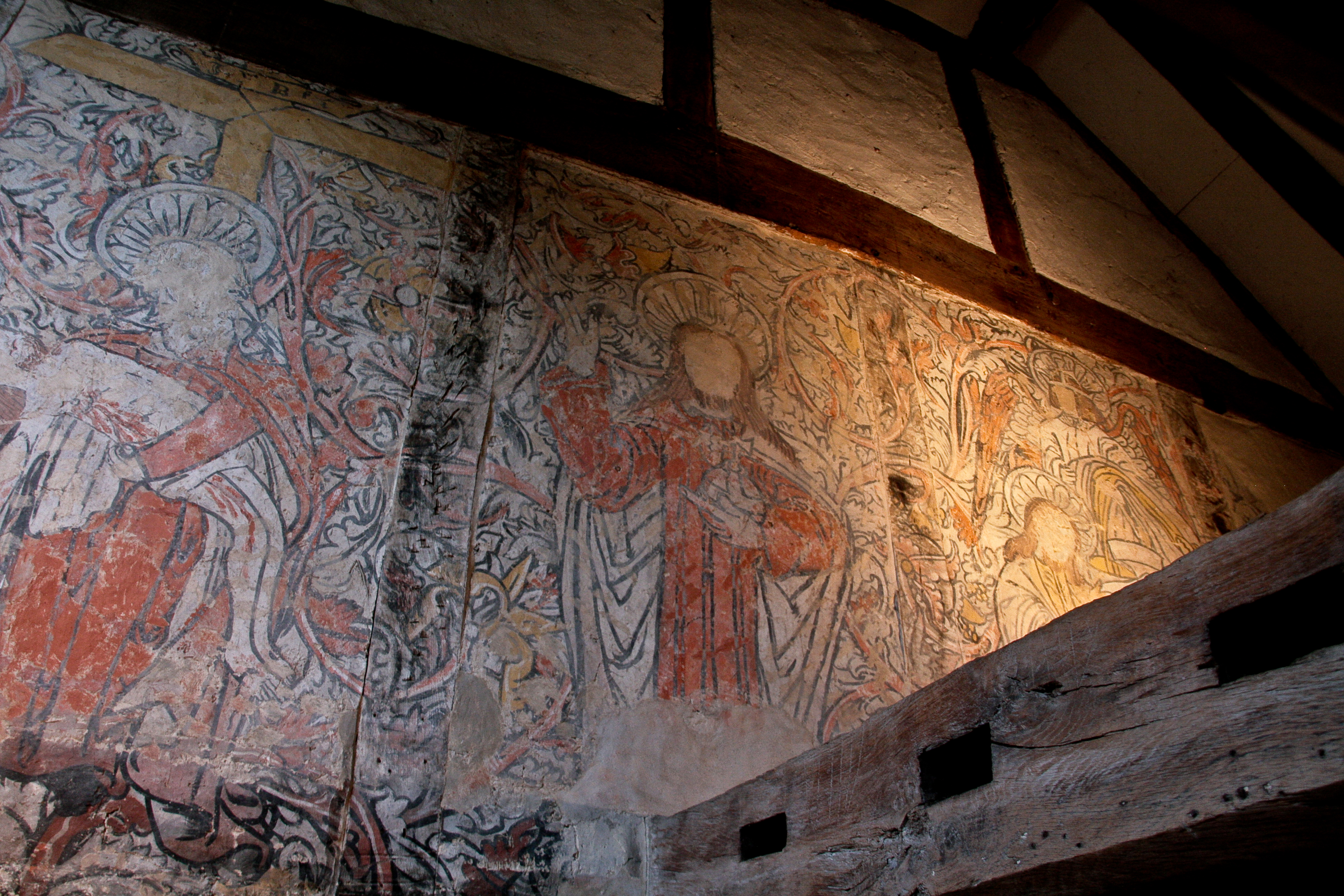
The Piccotts End wall paintings

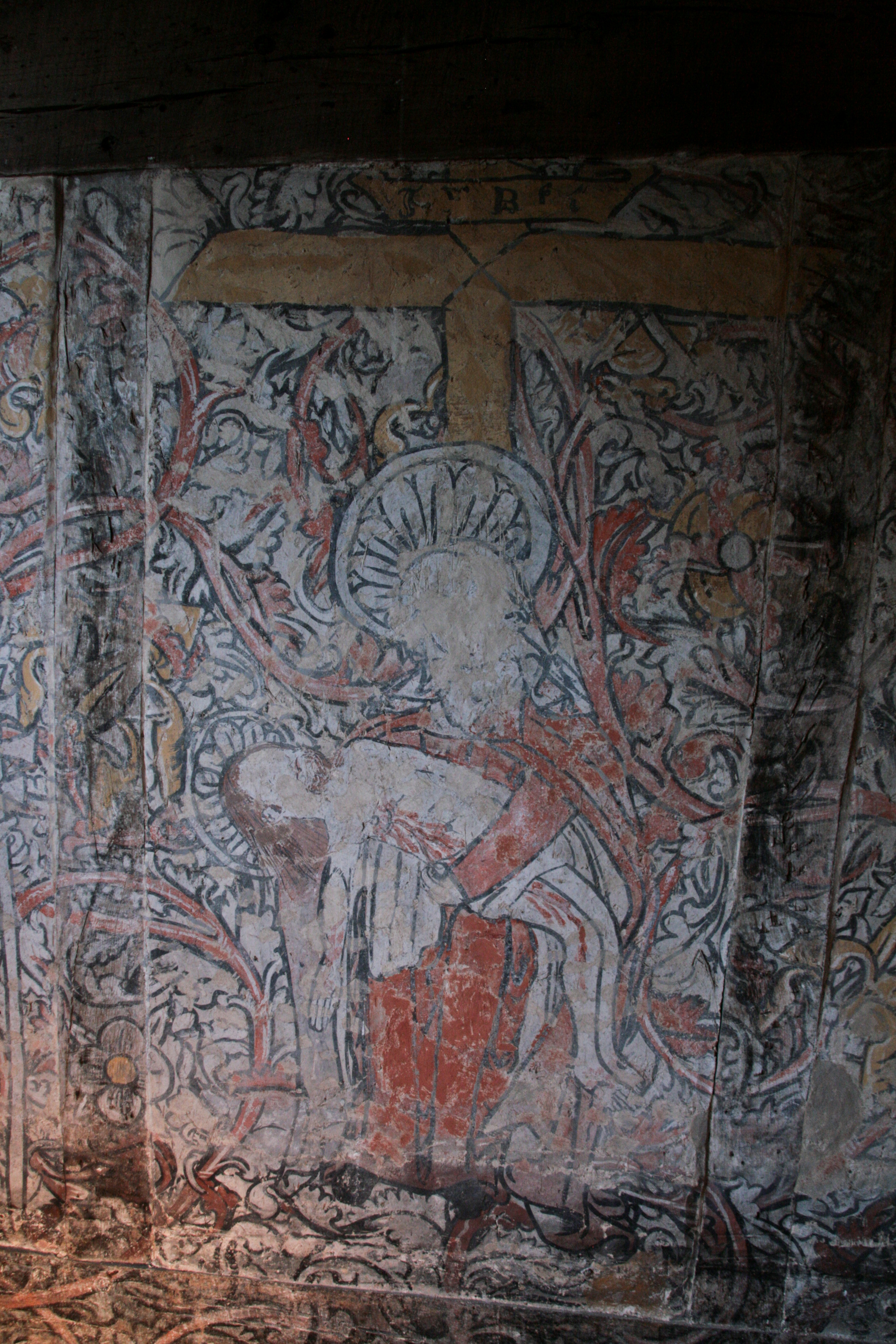
Detail of the wall paintings, showing a Pietà

Inside the house at number 132 are a number of fifteenth-century religious wall paintings, which are of particular interest to historians as a rare example of pre-Reformation English Catholic art. The paintings are thought to originate from around 1470–1500. Following the English Reformation, religious art came to be regarded as a form of idolatry and many works were obliterated or destroyed; for this reason, some of the faces in the Piccotts End murals were mutilated and the paintings subsequently covered over by whitewash. They remained hidden for over 400 years until they were uncovered in 1953 by a resident.

The origins of the paintings are unknown. Historians surmise that the Piccotts End house may have served as a hospice for pilgrims, as it was located close to a pilgrim trail which went via the nearby Ashridge Priory. At Ashridge, pilgrims could venerate a phial of the Blood of Christ before proceeding to St Albans Abbey to venerate the holy relics of Saint Alban. The art historian E. Clive Rouse has noted that the murals exhibit a technique of woodcut illustration dating from the late 15th and early 16th centuries, suggesting the influence of the artistic style of the Low Countries.

The wall paintings consist of five panels, arranged in a type of iconostasis, resembling a large screen covered with icons, set in tiers. In the centre panel is Christ in Majesty, with the "IHS" Sacred Monogram in the halo. In the right panel is depicted the Baptism of Jesus by Saint John the Baptist; in the background an archangel holds Christ's robes. On the extreme right is a badly damaged image of Saint Clement, the third Pope with a symbolic anchor on each shoulder and the Papal cross. The left panel contains a Pietà (the Virgin Mary holding the dead Christ), and on the far left is a representation of Saint Peter wearing the Papal Tiara, with a Papal cross and the Keys of Heaven. In the two lower panels are paintings of figures of St Catherine of Alexandria (with her Catherine wheel) and Saint Margaret of Antioch emerging from the belly of a dragon. Many figures are depicted wearing typical Tudor dress. They are decorated with orange-red, grey and blue and white foliation with yellow fruit and flowers. A blank space in the lower wall suggests the former presence of an altar.

=== Putative connections with Catharism ===
It has been suggested that some of the symbolism contained in the wall paintings indicate connections with the doctrines of Catharism, a sect considered heretical by the Catholic Church. This is linked to speculation regarding the religious views of the Augustinian community at Ashridge Priory, who were known as good men (Boni Homines). In Cathar texts, the terms good men (Bons Hommes), good women (Bonnes Femmes), or good Christians (Bons Chrétiens) are the common terms of self-identification. A 1943 article in Speculum establishes that there had been conflation of two unrelated groups and that the Boni Homines of Ashridge were not Cathars.

For purposes of clarity, the iconography of the murals needs to be considered separately from the issue of the supposed heretical leanings of the Augustinian canons at Ashridge. Some motifs have been claimed to be dualistic (in the sense of Manichaean or Cathar dualism). For example, it has been claimed that the emphasis on Christ’s suffering in the murals implied a belief that matter is evil (the Cathars believed that the material world had been created not by the true God but by a lower, corrupted power). On the other hand, it appears that visitors to the property are currently told that the murals are probably a statement of Catholic orthodoxy.

== Hospital ==
In the 1820s the building was converted for use as a cottage hospital by the anatomist and surgeon Sir Astley Cooper. In the early 1830s the number of patients increased because of injuries to workers constructing the London to Birmingham railway. Accordingly, the hospital moved to larger premises at Cheere House in Hemel Hempstead in 1832.

== See also ==
- Dean Incent's House
- Art in the Protestant Reformation and Counter-Reformation
- Medieval art

== Access ==
In recent years there has been limited opening of No. 132, which is privately owned. The public has been able to visit under the Heritage Open Days scheme. In 2014 a local conservation charity, Dacorum Heritage, launched an appeal to raise funds to buy the property.
