= List of road junctions in the United Kingdom: F =

This is a partial list of road junctions in the United Kingdom.

Many road junctions are named after pubs. For more information regarding the derivation of pub names, see pub names.

== F ==
Junction Name	Type	Location	Roads	Grid Reference	Notes
Fair Cross		near Grampound, Cornwall	B3287; unclass.	SW955473	
Fairways Roundabout	Roundabout	Two Mile Ash, Milton Keynes	V4 Watling Street; H3 Monks Way	52°02′26″N 0°49′07″W	
Falconwood Interchange		Falconwood, LB Bexley	A2 Rochester Way Relief Road; Rochester Way; Riefield Road	51°27′29″N 0°04′45″E	
Falmer Interchange	Grade separated Dumbbell roundabouts above A27.	Falmer, East Sussex	A27 Falmer Hill; Knights Gate Road; B2123 The Drove	TQ 35186 08859	
The Fantail		Farnborough, LB Bromley	A21 Farnborough Common; A232 Croydon Road; A232 Crofton Road	51°21′59″N 0°03′06″E	
Featherstone		Wolverhampton, West Midlands	M54 J1; A460 Cannock Rod	52°38′23″N 2°05′14″W	
Fence Roundabout	Roundabout	Aughton, South Yorkshire	B6200 Sheffield Road; Sheffield Road	53°22′03″N 1°20′23″W	
Fen Street Junction		Attleborough, Norfolk	A11 London Road; A11 Attleborough Bypass; London Road (formerly A11); Fen Street; Roe Road	TM025929	
Fenny Lock Roundabout		Fenny Lock, Milton Keynes	H10 Bletcham Way; unclass.	52°00′26″N 0°42′52″W	Reserved for future link with V8 Marlborough Street
Ferne Wall Corner		Milkwell, Wiltshire	unclass.	ST919223	
Ferrybridge	Roundabout Interchange	Ferrybridge, West Yorkshire	M62 J33; A1 Great North Road	53°41′45″N 1°16′06″W	
Fields End Roundabout		Goldthorpe, South Yorkshire	A635 Goldthorpe Road; B6098 Barrowfield Road; Barrowfield Road	53°32′13″N 1°18′30″W	
Fingerpost		near Bewdley, Worcestershire	A456; A4117	52.363°N 2.388°W	
Finsbury Circus		Moorgate, City of London	Finsbury Circus	51°31′05″N 0°05′12″W	
Finsbury Square		St Luke's, LB Islington	A501 Finsbury Pavement; A501 City Road; B100 Chiswell Street; B100 Sun Street	51°31′13″N 0°05′15″W	
Fire Stone Cross		South Zeal, Devon	unclass. (formerly A30); unclass.	SX668930	
Firway Cross	T junction	Morebath, Devon		51.0062°N 3.4754°W	
Fishbourne Roundabout	Roundabout	Chichester, West Sussex	A27; A259 Cathedral Way; Terminus Road; A27 Chichester Bypass; A259 Fishbourne Road West	SU 84682 04404	
Fishermead Roundabout		Fishermead, Milton Keynes	H7 Chaffron Way; V8 (B4034) Marlborough Street	52°02′10″N 0°44′09″W	
Five Bells		Vange, near Basildon, Essex	A13; A176; B1420 (formerly A13); B1464 (formerly A13); Bells Hill Road; High Road (Fobbing)	TQ710865	Junction straddles border with Thurrock, formerly part of Essex
Five Cross Way	5 way junction	Cullompton		50.8405°N 3.3624°W	
Five Crosses	5 way junction	Witheridge		50.9218°N 3.6476°W	
Five Elms Cross	T junction	Newton St Cyres	A377	50.7747°N 3.6040°W	
Five Lane End		Burton upon Trent, Staffordshire	B5234; B5017; Rangemore Hill; Belmot Road	52°48′55″N 1°44′08″W	
Five Lane Ends		Skellow, South Yorkshire	A1; B1220 Hampole Balk; Leys Lane; Crabgate Lane	SE521104	
Five Mile Hill Cross		Pathfinder Village, Devon	Five Mile Hill (formerly A30); Heath Lane	SX844931	
Five Oaks Cross	T junction	Newton St Cyres /Upton Pyne		50.7794°N 3.5606°W	
Five Ways Corner		Hendon, LB Barnet	M1 J2; A1 Great North Way; A1 Watford Way; A41 Watford Way; Page Street	51°36′04″N 0°14′02″W	
Five Ways	Roundabout Interchange	Birmingham	Broad Street; A456 Hagley Road; A4540 Ladywood Middleway; A4540 Islington Row Middleway; B4217 Calthorpe Road; B4284 Harborne Road	SP056861	Broad Street was part of the A456 until the late 2000s. It now starts in the underpass.
Five Ways Island		Dunstall Park, Wolverhampton	A449 Stafford Road; A449 Lower Stafford Street; Waterloo Road (former route of A449); Dunstall Road; Foxes Lane		A sixth road, North Road, originally joined at the same junction, Five Ways referring to the original choice of five directions when entering the junction.
Fivebridges Cross	T junction	Hemyock		50.9054°N 3.2105°W	
Fiveways Corner	Gyratory	Croydon, LB Croydon	A23 Purley Way; A232 Stafford Road; B271 Stafford Road; B275 Denning Avenue	51°21′59″N 0°07′03″W	
Fiveways Roundabout		Yeovil, Somerset	A37 Ilchester Road; A359 Mudford Road; Preston Road	50°56′45″N 2°38′14″W	
Flint Cross		Bridgefoot, Cambridgeshire	A505; B1368 London Road; B1368 Barley Road	TL408429	
Flood Street Island		Dudley, West Midlands	A461 Dudley Southern By-Pass; Flood Street; Blackacre Road	52°30′26″N 2°04′51″W	
Floristonrigg		Todhills, Cumbria	A74; unclass.	NY360642	
The Flouch Roundabout	Roundabout	Stocksbridge, South Yorkshire	A616 Whams Road; A628 Old Manchester Road	53°30′33″N 1°42′08″W	
Fontwell East Roundabout	Roundabout	Fontwell, West Sussex	A27/A29 Arundel Road; A29 London Road; A27 Arundel Road	SU 95694 07225	
Fontwell West Roundabout	Roundabout	Fontwell, West Sussex	A27 Arundel Road; A27/A29 Arundel Road; Arundel Road; A29 Fontwell Avenue	SU 95060 07104	
Ford Roundabout	Roundabout	Arundel, West Sussex	A27 Chichester Road; A284 London Road; Maltravers Street; A27 Arundel Bypass; Ford Road	TQ 01368 06887	
Ford Bridge Roundabout		Ashford, Surrey	A308 Staines By-Pass; A308 Kingston Road; B377 Ashford Road; B377 Ford Bridge Road	51°25′36″N 0°28′22″W	
Ford Cross		Monkton, Devon	A30 Butler Way; Hedgend Road	ST184029	
Fountain Roundabout		New Malden, Royal Borough of Kingston	A2043 Kingston Road; A2043 Malden Road; B282 Burlington Road; B283 High Street	51°23′55″N 0°15′20″W	
Four Cross	Double roundabout	Penryn, Cornwall	A39; A393; B3292	50.1843°N 5.1247°W	
Four Cross Ways		Willand, Devon	B3181 Silver Street (formerly A38); B3440 Uffculme Road; South View Road	ST039113	
Four Lane Ends		Over Hulton, Bolton	A6 Manchester Road; A6 Salford Road; A579 Newbrook Road; A579 St Helens Road	53°32′52″N 2°28′08″W	
Four Lane Ends		Sedbergh, Cumbria	A683; B6256; unclass.	54°18′23″N 2°34′32″W	
The Four Wantz	Roundabout	Ongar, Essex	A414 Epping Road; A414 Chelmsford Road; B184 Fyfield Road; A128 High Street	51°42′46″N 0°14′41″E	The Four Wantz derives its name from the original meaning of the Four Ways
Four Went Ways	Roundabout Interchange	Little Abington, Cambridgeshire	A11; A1307 Cambridge Road	TL522502	
Fowley Cross		Okehampton, Devon	A3079 Holsworthy Road (formerly A30); A386 Bowerland Road	50°43′51″N 4°02′36″W	
Fox and Hounds		Comford near Redruth	A393; B3298	50.2153°N 5.1770°W	
Fox Milne Roundabout		Milton Keynes Village, Milton Keynes	H6 (A4146) Childs Way; V11 (A4146) Tongwell Street	52°02′55″N 0°42′27″W	
Foxhills Roundabout		Scunthorpe, Lincolnshire	A1077 Phoenix Parkway; Clayfield Road	53°36′19″N 0°39′43″W	
Foxholes Roundabout	Roundabout	Hertford, Hertfordshire	A414; B1197 London Road	51°47′37″N 0°03′43″W	Known locally as the Lancaster Roundabout after the motor dealer on the site
Foxley Corner		Wedhampton, Wiltshire	B3098; unclass.	SU054572	
Friar's Wash		Flamstead, Hertfordshire	M1 J9; A5 London Road; A5183 Dunstable Road (formerly A5); Watery Lane	51°49′13″N 0°25′04″W	
Frodingham Grange		Scunthorpe, Lincolnshire	M181; A18 Doncaster Road; A1077 Phoenix Parkway	53°35′22″N 0°41′55″W	
Frognal Corner	Roundabout with underpass	Sidcup, LB Bexley	A20 Sidcup Bypass; A222 Perry Street / Chislehurst Road	51°25′7″N 0°5′52″E	Named after nearby Frognal House
Fulford Interchange	Dumbbell interchange	Fulford, York	A19 Selby Road; A64 York By-Pass; St Nicholas' Avenue	53°55′31″N 1°4′2″W	
Fulham Broadway		Fulham, LB Hammersmith and Fulham	A304 Fulham Road; A3219 Dawes Road	51°28′49″N 0°11′47″W	
Fullarton Road Interchange		Glasgow	M74 J2A; A74 London Road; Fullarton Road	55°50′07″N 4°10′18″W	
The Fulshaw Cross: aka King's Arms Roundabout		Wilmslow, Cheshire	Alderley Road (formerly A34); B5086 Knutsford Road	53°19′15″N 2°14′12″W	Named after a stone cross placed at the side of the roundabout. Also known as the King's Arms after the pub.
Fulwell Cross		Barkingside, LB Redbridge	A123 High Street Barkingside; A123 Fencepiece Road; Forest Road; Fulwell Avenue; Craven Gardens	51°35′37″N 0°5′7″E	
Furnace Lane		Aughton, South Yorkshire	B6200 Retford Road; B6064 Furnace Lane	53°21′59″N 1°21′08″W	
Furzton Roundabout		Furzton, Milton Keynes	H7 Chaffron Way; V3 Fulmer Street	52°00′44″N 0°46′42″W	
