= Ashridge Priory =

Priory in Little Gaddesden, Dacorum, England, UK

Coordinates: 51.799°N 0.56°W

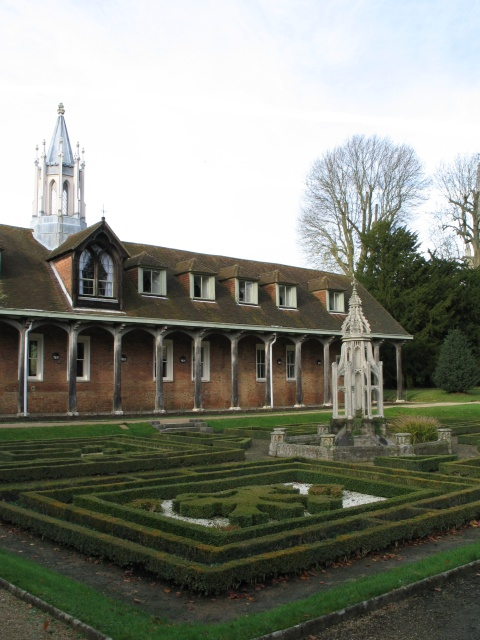
A part of Ashridge House which may have formed part of the old priory

Ashridge Priory was a medieval college of Austin canons called variously the "Brothers of Penitence" or the "Boni Homines". It was founded by Edmund of Almain in 1283 who donated, among other things, a phial of Christ's blood to the abbey. It was granted to Mary Tudor, Queen of France and later became the private residence of the future queen Elizabeth I. It was acquired by Sir Thomas Egerton in 1604 and then passed down to the Duke of Bridgewater before being demolished.

== History ==
In 1283 Edmund, son of Richard, Earl of Cornwall holders of Berkhamsted Castle (two and half miles away) founded a monastery at Ashridge, Hertfordshire. The monastery was built for a rector and twenty canons who formed, according to the sixteenth-century historian Polydore Vergil, "a new order not before seen in England, and called the Boni homines".

At the foundation of the abbey Edmund, 2nd Earl of Cornwall donated, among other things, a phial of Christ's blood. This relic was perhaps not so well known as the Holy Blood which the Earl of Cornwall donated to Hailes Abbey in Gloucestershire, but it proved fruitful for the abbey. Pilgrims from all over Europe flocked to see the phial and the abbey grew quite wealthy as a result of their donations.

One such visitor was King Edward I. In 1290 he held parliament at the abbey while he spent Christmas in Pitstone. The Black Prince, a later lord of Berkhampstead castle, became interested in the College around the time of the Black Death around 1350. A second house of the Order was established at the prince's suggestion at Edington, Wiltshire around 1358 by William Edington.

The last rector was Thomas Waterhouse, who surrendered the house to Henry VIII. The building ceased to be used for religious purposes shortly afterwards.

At the Dissolution of the Monasteries the priory was surrendered to the crown and King Henry VIII used it to house his children, namely Prince Edward and the Princesses Mary and Elizabeth. Eventually he bequeathed the property to his daughter Elizabeth. It was here that Elizabeth was arrested in February 1554, under suspicion of treason during Wyatt's rebellion. Two doctors, George Owen and Thomas Wendy, certified that she was fit to travel and she was taken to the Tower of London.

In 1604 the priory was acquired by Sir Thomas Egerton. A descendant of his, the Duke of Bridgewater, demolished the old buildings in the 1760s.

== Albigensian connection ==
There has been speculation that the order was in some way associated with the Albigensian heresy of southern France whose perfecti called themselves bonhommes. Edmund's mother had been married by proxy to Raymond VI, Count of Toulouse, a protector of the heretical sect. Wall paintings in the college cloisters, now lost, were described in the eighteenth century as favouring the Albigensians. Wall paintings in a cottage at Piccotts End, near Ashridge, have been similarly described. These paintings were discovered in the 1950s and have been preserved.

== See also ==
- Ashridge
- Ashridge Business School
- Collegiate and Parochial Church of St Peter, Ruthin

== Sources ==
- Douglas Coult (1980). "2-6". A Prospect of Ashridge. Chichester: Phillimore. ISBN 978-0-85033-360-2.
