= The Hoo, Great Gaddesden =

House in England

Coordinates: 51°48′14″N 0°29′53″W

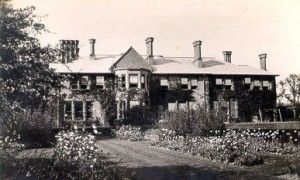
The Hoo, Great Gaddesden

The Hoo is a Grade II* listed country house in Great Gaddesden, Hertfordshire, England. It dates from around 1683. In 1944 it was in use as a maternity home.
