= Golden Parsonage =

The Golden Parsonage
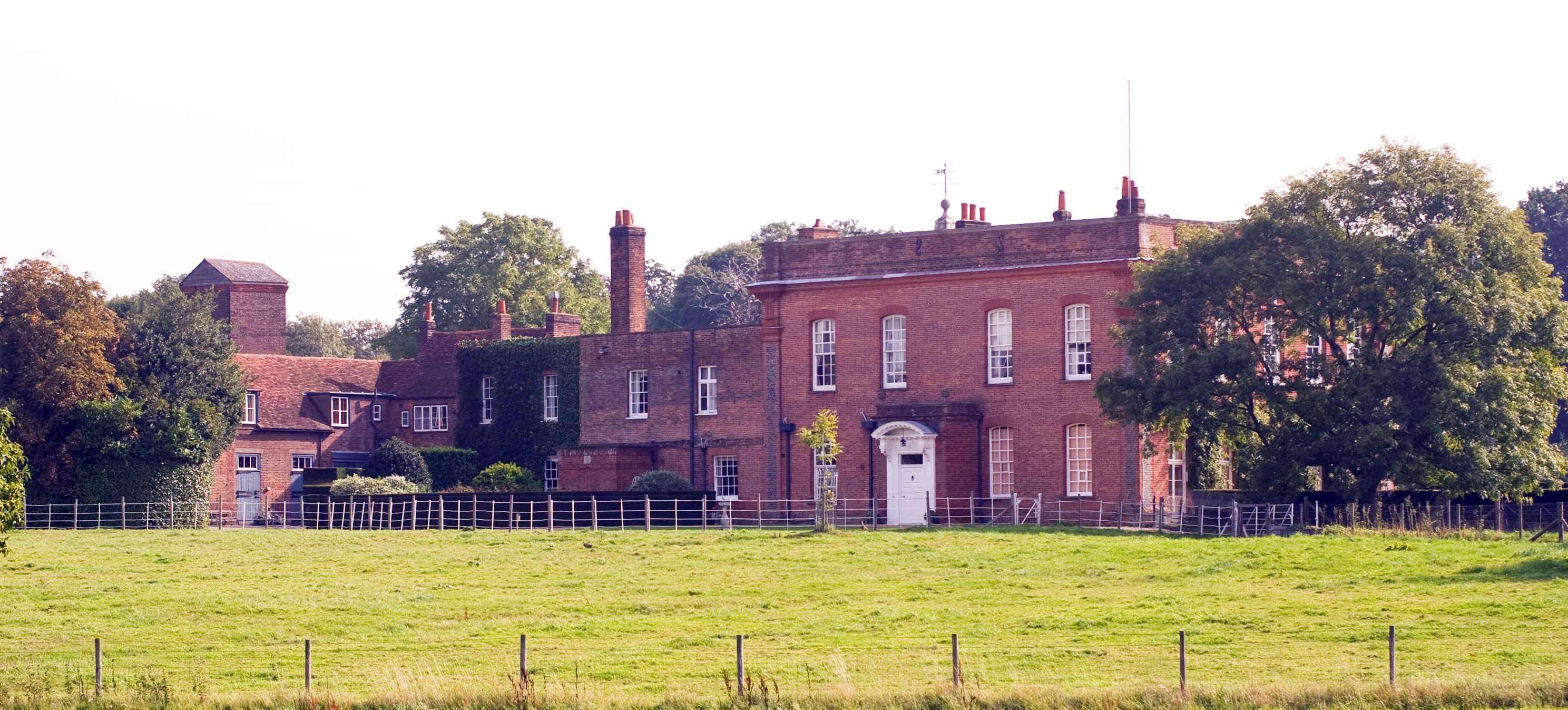
- The Golden Parsonage

- Location within Hertfordshire

General information
- Type: Country House
- Location: Gaddesden Row, Great Gaddesden
- Coordinates: 51°48′5.4″N 0°28′40.44″W
- Completed: c. 1705

The Golden Parsonage is a Grade II* listed country house in Great Gaddesden, Hertfordshire, and is part of the Gaddesden Estate. The house remains in the ownership of the Halsey Family.

== History ==
The land upon which the Golden Parsonage sits, was once a part of the Kings Langley Priory, having been owned on the Orders behalf by the Prioress of Dartford. Part of this land was farmed by John Halsey who tenanted at the site from 1520 onwards. Following the Dissolution of the Monasteries, the Priory closed and the land passed to The Crown. In 1544, the land was purchased for £174 13s 4d by William Halsey, John's son. The land was subsequently passed down the Halsey family. One of John's descendants, Thomas Halsey emigrated to Southampton, New York and in 1660 built Halsey House. Halsey House now stands as a museum and is one of the oldest buildings in New York.

The Golden Parsonage as it now stands is credited to Thomas Halsey (1655–1715), a Tory Member of Parliament for Hertfordshire, having been built in c. 1705. Thomas was married Anne, the daughter of noted alchemist, statesman and co-founder of the Royal Society, Thomas Henshaw. The avenue of Lime Trees was planted by Thomas's son, Henshaw Halsey, a monument for whom stands in St John the Baptish Church in Great Gaddesden, created by Flemish Sculptor John Michael Rysbrack.

In 1768, Thomas Halsey feeling that the Golden Parsonage was out of date, commissioned James Wyatt to design and build a new seat for the Halsey family in the style of a Palladian Villa. This would become Gaddesden Place. The family would live in Gaddesden Place until 1950, when Sir Thomas Halsey would return the family to the Golden Parsonage. Further alterations to the Parsonage would be made in 1869, when Frederick Halsey would build a Billiard room. With the Halsey family living at Gaddesden Place, the Golden Parsonage was used for other purposes. Most notably for sixty years starting in 1875, the house served as a boys prep school, of which Thomas J. Bata was a notable student.

Since their return in 1950, the Golden Parsonage has remained as the home of the Halsey family, and is currently overseen by Nicholas, Viola and Guy Halsey. The present head of the family however, is Rev. Brother John Halsey who eschews his inherited title.
