= John Incent =

English clergyman

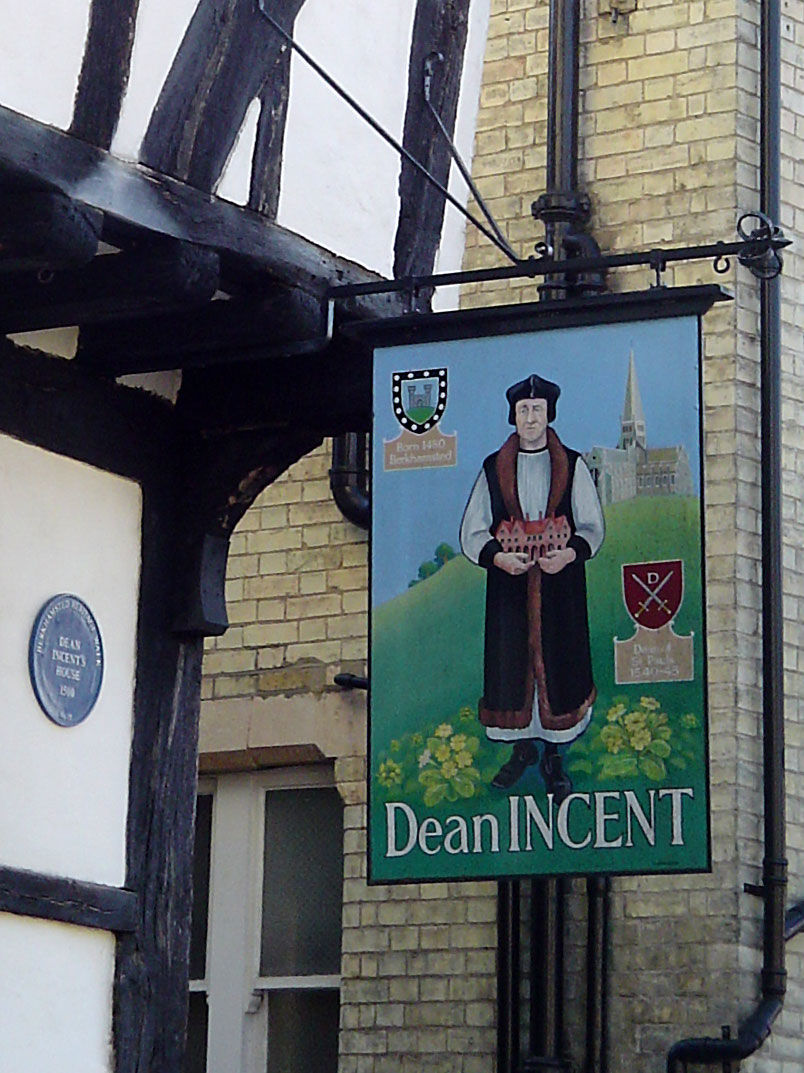
- Sign on the Berkhamsted house depicting John Incent
- Born: c. 1480; Berkhamsted, England
- Died: 1545; Berkhamsted
- Other name: John Innocent
- Education: University of Cambridge (1500); B.C.L. All Souls College, Oxford (1506); D.C.L. 1513
- Parent(s): Robert and Katherine Incent
- Church: Church of England
- Ordained: 1513
- Congregations served: Several in the Diocese of Winchester
- Offices held: Prebendary of St Paul's London], 1519-4; Canon residentiary, 1534; Master of Holy Cross Hospital, Winchester, 1537; Dean of St Paul's London, 1540-5; Adm. at Gray's Inn, 1542

John Incent (c. 1480 – 1545) was an English clergyman in the early 16th century, during the early years of the English Reformation. Originating from the town of Berkhamsted in Hertfordshire, he studied at the University of Cambridge and later at All Souls College, Oxford, and served as Dean of St Paul's Cathedral in London between 1540 and 1545.

Incent is noted for being one of the agents of the Lord Chancellor Thomas Cromwell, responsible for the sequestration of religious properties during the Dissolution of the Monasteries and as the founder of Berkhamsted School. His home in Berkhamsted, built in 1500, remains in use to the present day, situated on the High Street facing St Peter's Church.

== Early life ==
John Incent was born in Berkhamsted around 1480 and was the son of Katherine and Robert Incent. Robert was the Secretary to Cicely, Duchess of York, the last royal resident at Berkhamsted Castle, wife of the Duke of York and mother of two Kings of England: Edward IV and Richard III. The standing of the Incent family in the town is marked by two brass memorials to Robert and Katherine in St John's Chapel in St Peter's Church. According to the inscriptions, Robert died in 1485 of the Great Sweating Sickness:

Here lyeth buryed and thys stone the body of Robert Incent Gentylman late suant to the nobel pryncess Cecyle duchesse of Yorke & mother unto the worthy kyng Edward and Richard the thyrde whych sayd Robert dyed of the grete swetyng sykeness the first yere of the reygne of kyng Henry the vii upon whose sowlys Jhu have mercy Amen.

Here lyeth buryed und(er) thys stone the bodye of Kateryn sumtyme wife of Robert Incent, Vgent father and mother unto John Incent docto(r) of ye lawe who hath done many benyfyt & ornament given unto thys chapel of Saynt John whyche sayd Kateryn dyed the XII day of Marche ye xii yere of the reygne of kyng Henry the viii.

== Education and career ==
At the age of 20, Incent studied civil law for one year at Cambridge University, continuing his studies at All Souls College, Oxford and graduating as a Bachelor of Common Law. In 1509 he was appointed as an ecclesiastical lawyer in the Chancellor's Court. Richard Foxe, Bishop of Winchester and the Lord Privy Seal, appointed Incent in 1512 Commissary and President of the Episcopal Consistory in the Winchester diocese. Incent became a Doctor of Civil Law in 1513, and in the same year he was ordained as a priest in the Church of England.

Incent's career continued to flourish: he took charge of several parishes around Winchester; became master of the Hospital of St Cross in Winchester and the Hospital of Domus Dei in Portsmouth; and he acquired a prebendal stall in St Paul's Cathedral. Upon Bishop Foxe's death in 1529, Cardinal Wolsey became Bishop of Winchester and Incent soon became Chaplain to King Henry VIII, serving during the turbulent period of Henry's divorce from Catherine of Aragon. Following the break with Rome, Incent, like many other clergy, renounced Roman Catholicism.

Incent's loyalty to the king was evident; he was a faithful supporter of the king's chief minister, Thomas Cromwell, who was a leader of the Dissolution of the Monasteries, and probably played an active part in the destruction of religious houses. In 1540 he turned the Domus Dei Hospital over to the Crown for use as an arsenal in the coastal defences against France. Incent's devotion was rewarded when he was appointed by the king as Dean of St Paul's Cathedral. Cromwell, meanwhile had fallen into disfavour with the king and he was executed that same year.

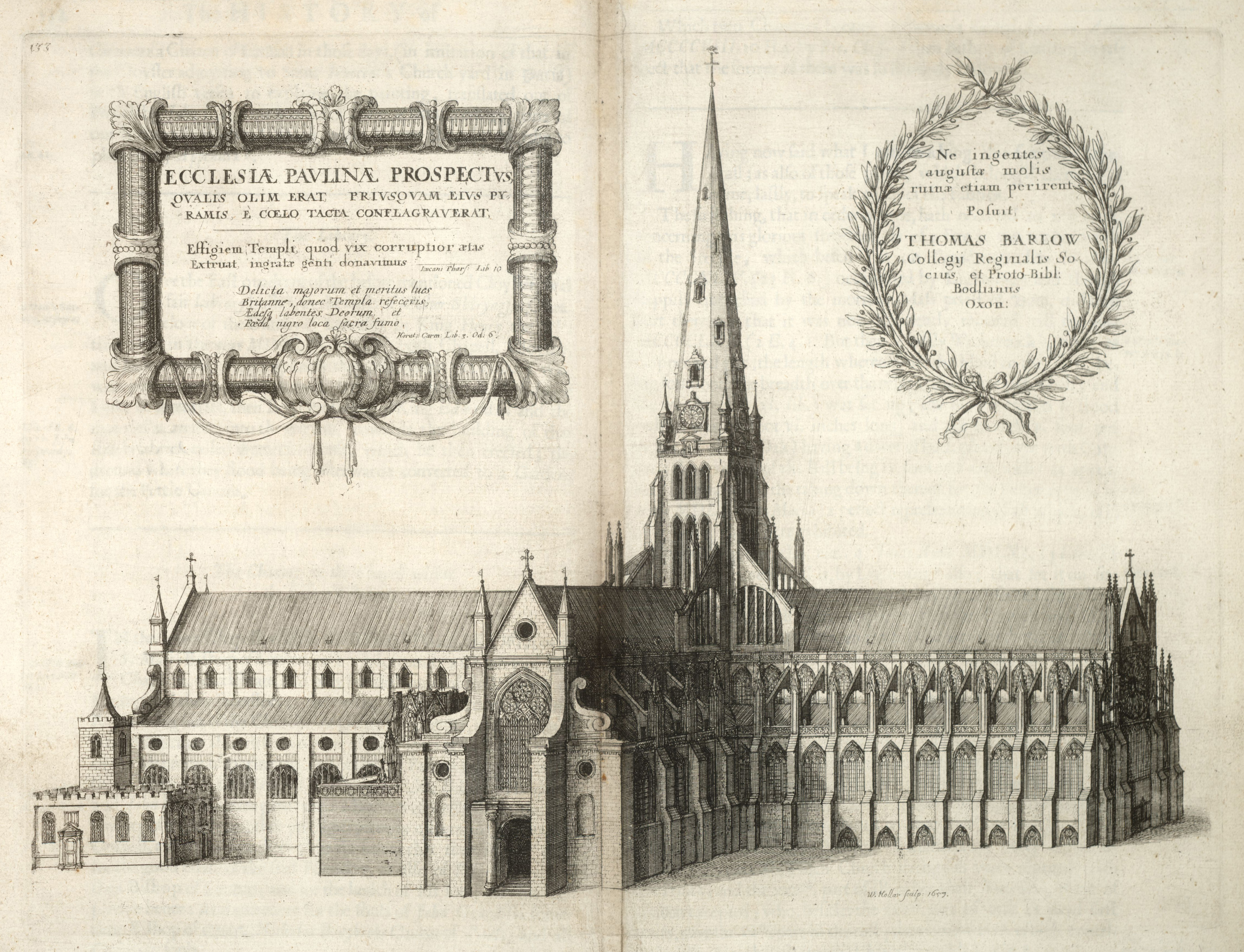
St Paul's Cathedral as it appeared in Incent's day (illustration c.1670)

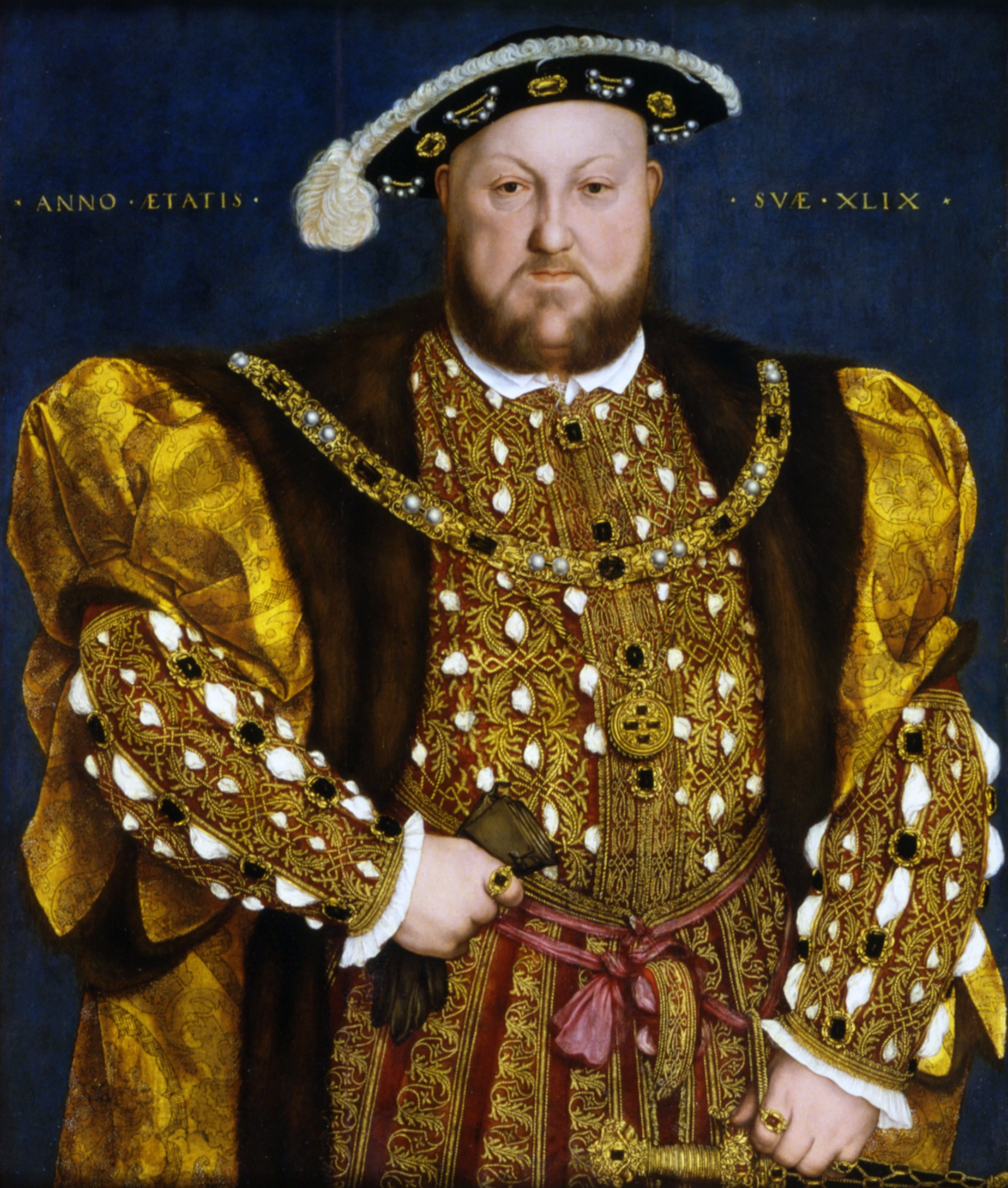
Incent was Chaplain to Henry VIII from 1529

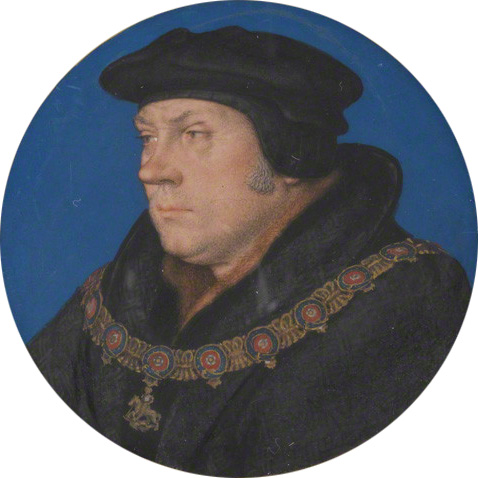
Thomas Cromwell

== Foundation of Berkhamsted School ==
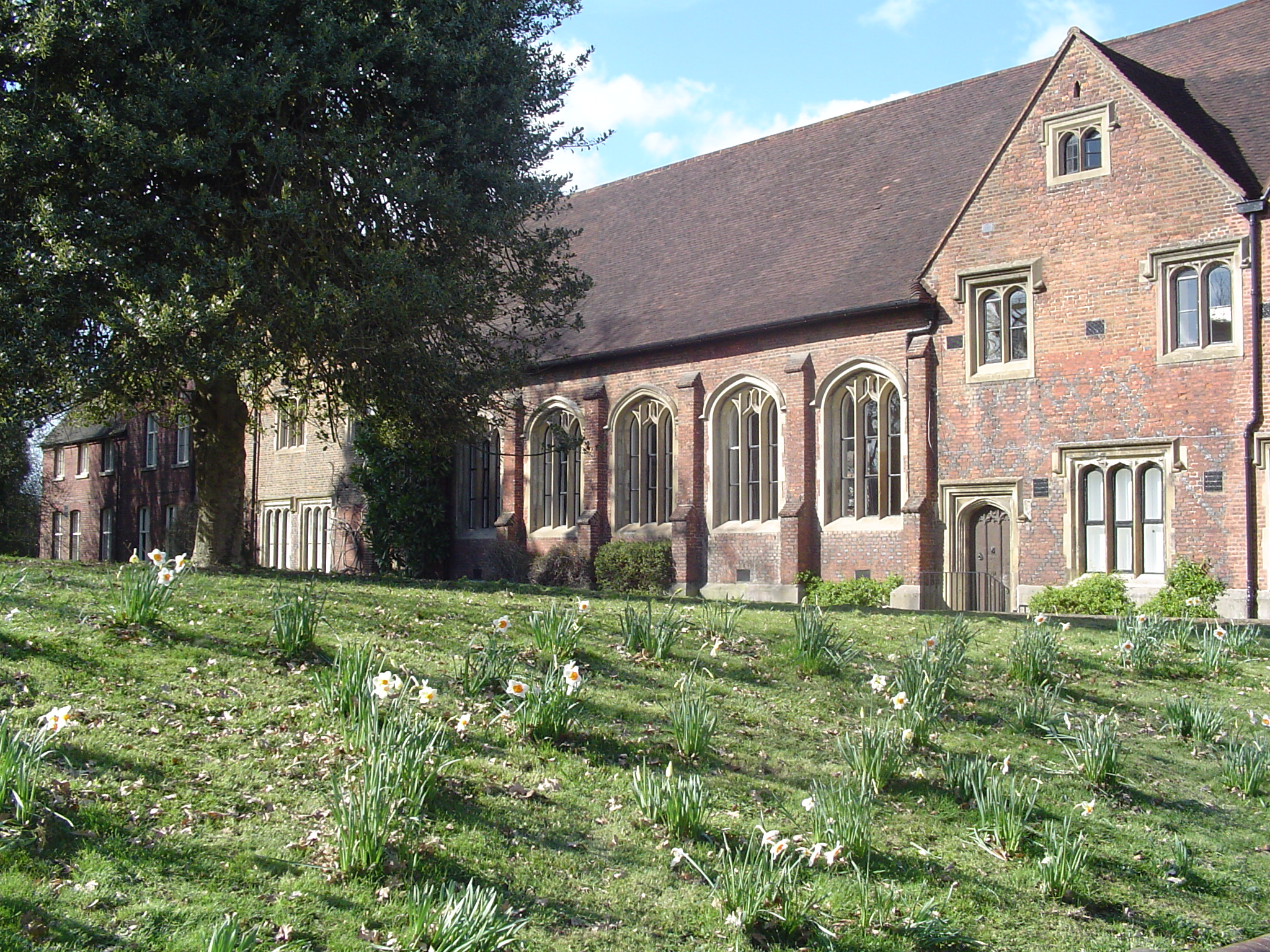
Berkhamsted School Old Hall (1544)

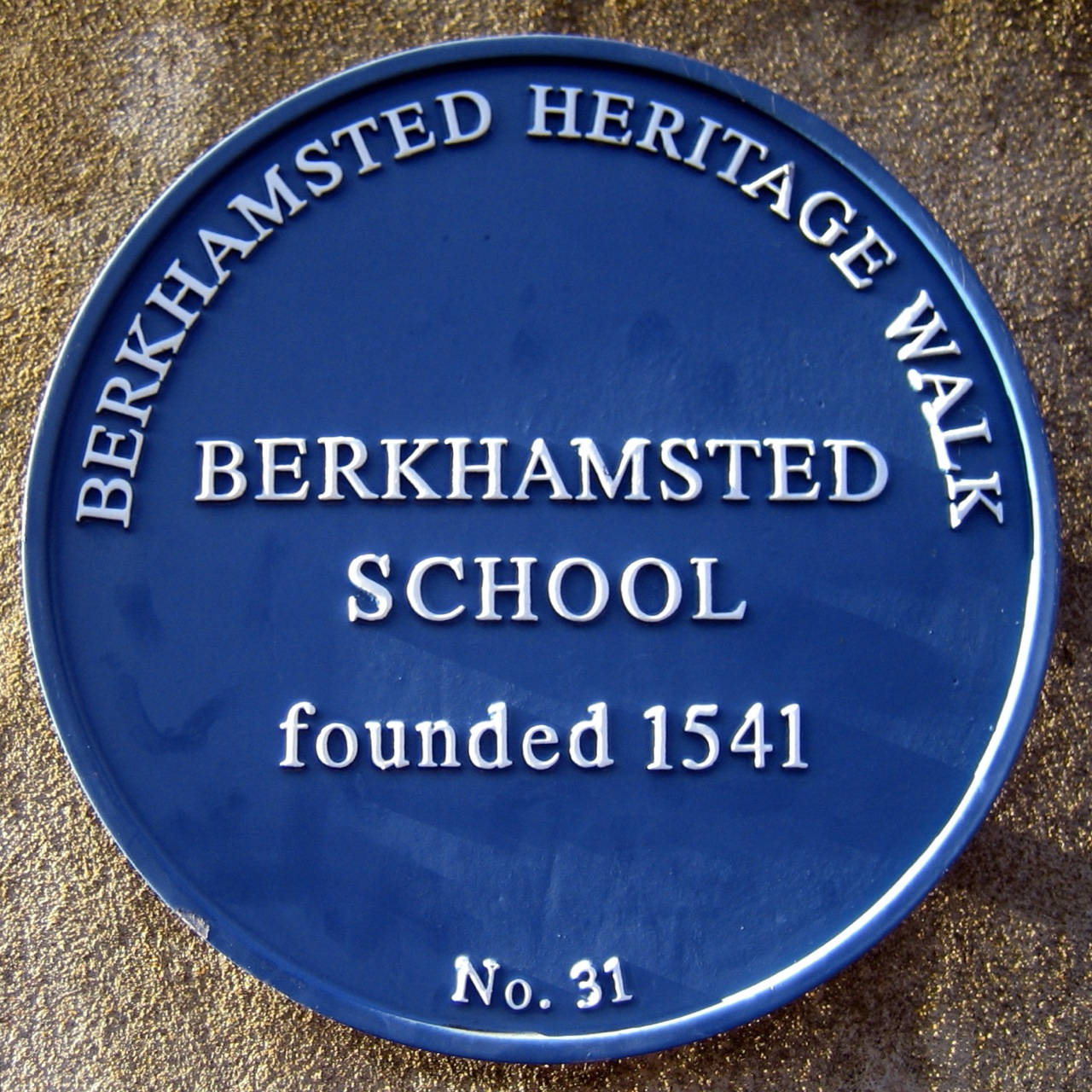

It was common at this time for high-ranking clergy to make their mark by founding schools. Incent was master of the Brotherhood of St John the Baptist in Berkhamsted, a monastic hospital which Incent himself had closed down. In 1523 he appropriated the brotherhood's lands and joined it to his own land, donating it for the creation of a school. In 1541 he obtained a Royal Charter for "one chauntry perpetual and schools for boys not exceeding 144 to be called Dean Incent's Free School in Berkhamstedde". Records of the time state that Incent "builded with all speed a fair schoole lartge and great all of brick very sumptuously.". It was completed in 1544; "when ye said school was thus finished, ye Deane sent for ye cheafe men of ye towne into ye school where he kneeling gave thanks to Almighty God". The school had no chapel of its own; for over 300 years the St John's Chantry in neighbouring St Peter's Church was used exclusively by the masters and boys of the school for worship, until a new school chapel was built in 1894 by Charles Henry Rew, based on the design of the church of the Santa Maria dei Miracoli, Venice.

Incent died some 18 months after his school opened, but it remains today as a lasting legacy of his more constructive activities. The founder died intestate and there were legal arguments originating from "Evill Persons" who claimed a financial interest in his estate. To protect the school from subsequent challenges of this nature, school was incorporated by an Act of Parliament as The Free Schole of King Edwarde the Sixte in Berkhampstedde, making the Master and the Usher into trustees of the school property and making the Warden of All Soul's, Oxford the Visitor. The school adopted a common seal bearing Incent's coat of arms.

== Dean Incent's House ==
Dean Incent's House stands on Berkhamsted High Street and is a two-storey Grade II* listed building.
