= Cheverells =

Building in Hertfordshire, England

Coordinates: 51°49′39″N 0°28′16″W

Cheverells is a Grade II* listed dower house to the Beechwood Park estate in Hertfordshire, England. It dates from around 1693.
