= Gaddesden Hall =

House in Great Gaddesden, Hertfordshire, England

Coordinates: 51°46′31″N 0°29′23″W

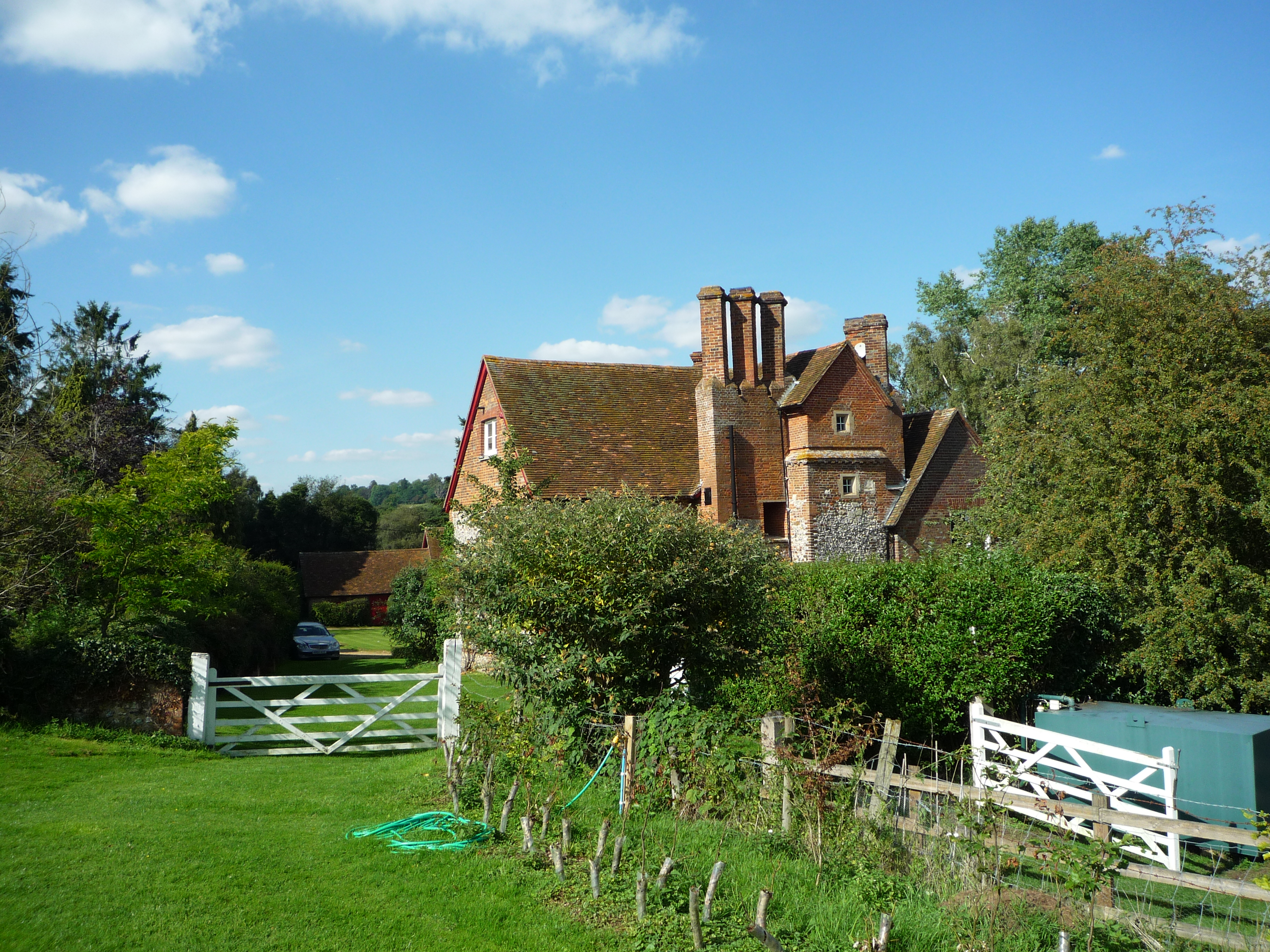
Gaddesden Hall

Gaddesden Hall is a Grade II* listed manor house in Water End, Great Gaddesden, Hertfordshire, England. It was the manor-house for the manor of Southall, a sub-manor of Great Gaddesden, and was originally called Southall. Later it was known as Oliver's Place after its owner from 1448, Robert Oliver. It has been known as Gaddesden Hall since the 17th century.
