= The Manor House, Chipperfield =

House in Chipperfield, Hertfordshire, England

Coordinates: 51°42′06″N 0°29′07″W

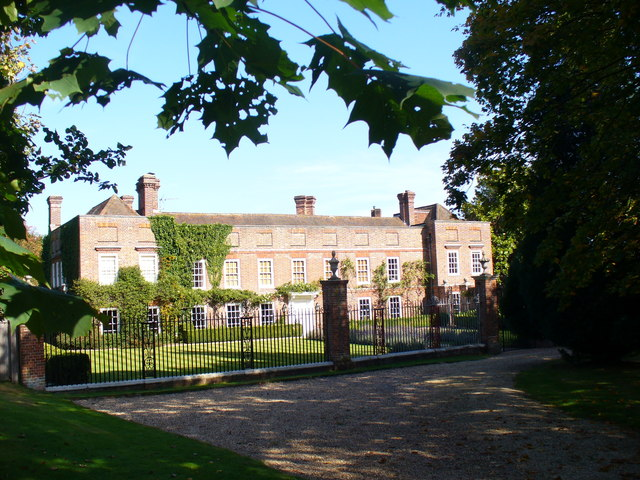
The Manor House

The Manor House (formerly known as Pingelsgate) is a country house in Chipperfield, Hertfordshire, England. It dates from the late medieval period. It has been listed Grade II* on the National Heritage List for England since December 1986.

It has its origins in a late medieval hall house possibly dating from the early 16th century. It has been speculated that it was rebuilt for a clerk, Thomas Gulston, prior to the 1590s. It was refronted in brick for a John Marriott in the 1710s. A cistern on the house is dated 1716. North and south wings in symmetrical design were added to the original frontage of the house in 1912 by owner Samuel Blackwell. The house has wooden panelling with the arms of the Kettell family. The panelling was transferred to the house in 1852 following the demolition of the Manor House in Kings Langley High Street by Robert Blackwell, who renamed this house from Pingelsgate to the Manor House.

The house is 2 storeys high in red brick with a wide frontage of 11 windows.

The comedian and actor Peter Sellers bought the Manor House in the 1960s. It was subsequently owned by Gerald Legge, 9th Earl of Dartmouth.

It was available to rent at £10,000 a month in 1998 (equivalent to £222,260 in 2023).
