= 173, High Street, Berkhamsted =

Medieval building in Hertfordshire, England

Coordinates: 51.760268°N 0.564611°W

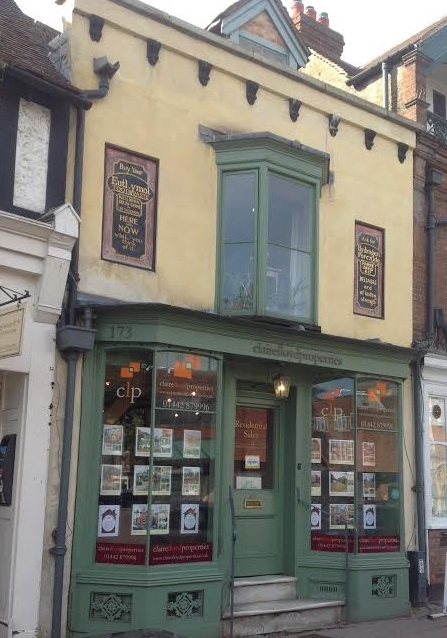
173 High Street, one of several buildings in Berkhamsted that have medieval origins; it is the oldest jettied timber building in the United Kingdom

173, High Street, Berkhamsted, is a medieval building in Hertfordshire, England. It is considered to be the oldest extant jettied timber framed building in Great Britain, dated by dendrochronology of structural timbers to between 1277 and 1297. At the time of the building's construction, the town of Berkhamsted was a relatively large, flourishing wool trading market town that benefited from having an important royal castle.

== History ==
The building was given a Victorian facade and was used as a pharmacy in the nineteenth century. Its historical significance was not recognised until 2001 when it was Grade II* listed after the medieval timber framing was exposed during renovation work. It is currently used as an estate agent's.

The building received two grants from English Heritage, one for investigations and one for conservation work. Dr Simon Thurley, Chief Executive of English Heritage, said "This is an amazing discovery. It gives an extraordinary insight into how Berkhamsted High Street would have looked in medieval times."

Initially, the investigations suggested that it had always been a shop, as there was evidence for the existence of a jeweller or goldsmith's shop with a workshop behind. This generated headlines to the effect that the country's "oldest shop" had been discovered. The age of the building would make it a contender for the title, but there is doubt about how long it served as a shop. It is now believed to have originally been a jettied service wing to a larger aisled hall house, which has since disappeared.

== See also ==
- Dean Incent's House (also on High Street, Berkhamsted)
