= The Old Bell, Hemel Hempstead =

Pub in Hemel Hempstead, Hertfordshire, England

Coordinates: 51°45′34″N 0°28′19″W

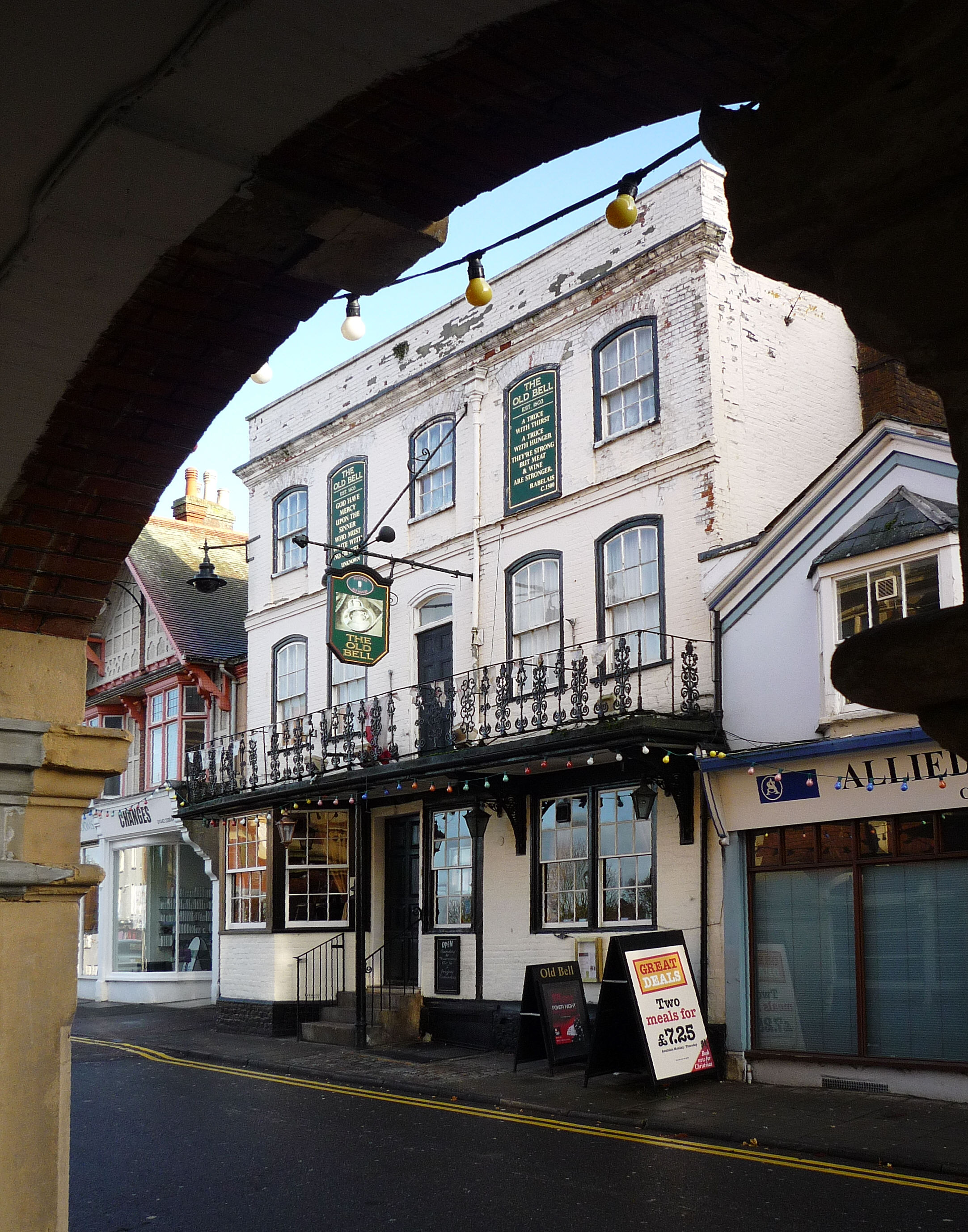
The Old Bell

The Old Bell is a grade II* listed public house in Hemel Hempstead, Hertfordshire, England. It dates from the early 18th century and is built on the site of an earlier inn that dated from 1603.
