= Dean Incent's House =

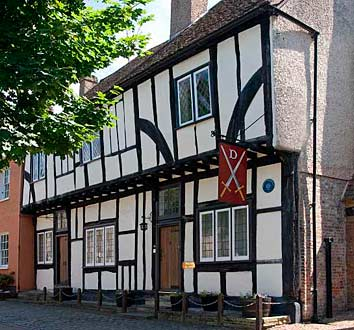
- Dean Incent's House, Berkhamsted

- Location within Hertfordshire

General information
- Type: Town house
- Architectural style: Half-timbered house
- Location: 129 High Street, Berkhamsted, England, United Kingdom
- Coordinates: 51.759673°N 0.561751°W
- Completed: c. 1500
- Inaugurated: c. 1400
- Client: Robert Incent

Technical details
- Structural system: Timber frame

Design and construction
- Designations: Grade II* listed building

Dean Incent's House is a 15th-century timber-framed house in Berkhamsted, Hertfordshire, England. It is reputed to be the birthplace of John Incent (c. 1480 – 1545), a dean in the Church of England who held office at St Paul's Cathedral from 1540 to 1545.

The two-storey house is situated on Berkhamsted High Street. Since 1950 it has been a Grade II* listed building.

== History ==
The oldest domestic building on Berkhamsted High Street is probably no. 173. However, Dean Incent's House has a rival claim. Evidence exists that an older medieval building stood to the rear of the house, at right angles to the High Street. Part of this older house was incorporated into the Tudor house which was built facing the High Street. It is thought that the house may originally have been used as a public meeting hall before the construction of the Court House on the opposite side of the road.

In the late 15th century, the house belonged to Robert and Katherine Incent. They were a family of high standing in the town of Great Berkhamsted, Robert serving as Secretary to Cicely, Duchess of York, the last royal resident at Berkhamsted Castle, wife of the Duke of York and mother of two Kings of England, Edward IV and Richard III. The house is named after the Incents' son, John Incent (c. 1480 – 1545), a priest in the Church of England who served as Chaplain to King Henry VIII during the turbulent period of Henry's divorce from Catherine of Aragon. In 1540, Incent was appointed by the King as Dean of St Paul's Cathedral in recognition of his loyalty and service during the Break with Rome. The Incent family are commemorated with memorials in the Church of St Peter, Great Berkhamsted, which stands on the High Street opposite Dean Incent's House.

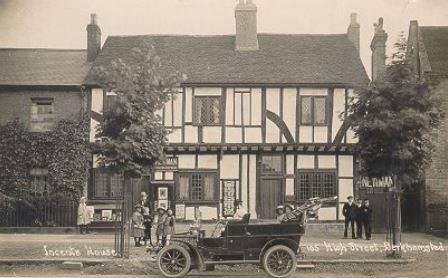
Incent's House photographed by J.T. Newman (c. 1908)

In common with many high-ranking clergy at this time, John Incent founded a school in the town. Dean Incent's Free School in Berkhamstedde was established in 1541 using land that he had appropriated from the monastic hospital of St John the Baptist during the Dissolution of the Monasteries. The school, which stands behind St Peter's Church, is still in existence today as the Berkhamsted School.

Around 1907–8, Dean Incent's House was occupied by a local photographer, James T Newman, who had moved to Berkhamsted in 1888. Newman set up a studio in the house and shot many photographs of Berkhamsted, as well as photographs of the Inns of Court Regiment which was based in Berkhamsted during World War I. His photographic legacy has provided a substantial historical record of late 19th and early 20th century life in the town.

From 1930 to 1970, Dean Incent's House was used as a traditional tearoom and restaurant, after which it was used as accommodation for schoolmasters at Berkhamsted School. It has since been returned to use as a private dwelling.

== Architecture ==
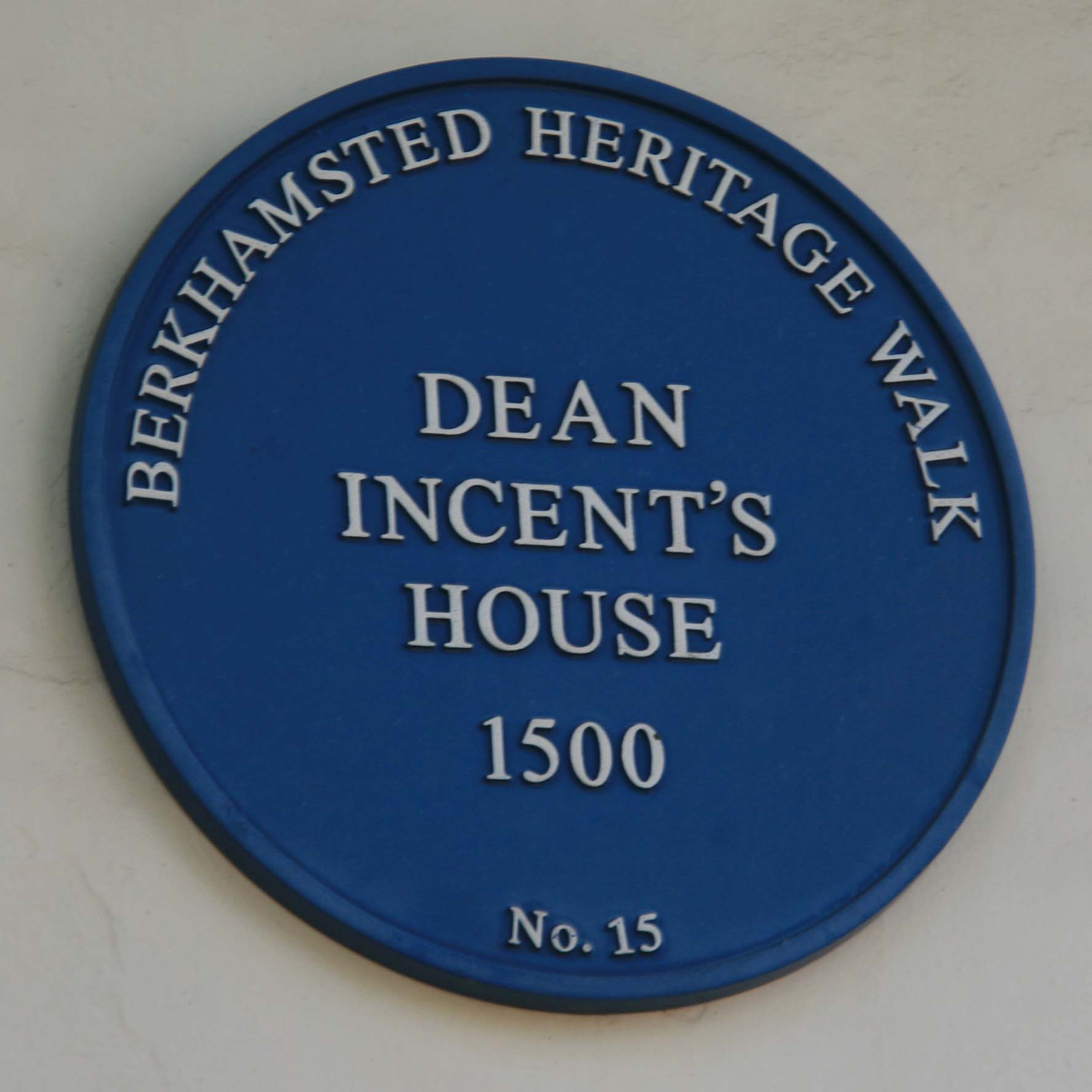

The house was built sometime in the 16th Century in the half-timbered style typical of the period with plaster infilling. The ground floor and oversailed first floor have leaded casement windows flush with the plaster. The oldest section of the structure is the south-west part, dating from the 14th century, which appears to have been originally part of a larger hall house. This suggests that this was a house of high status that may have been used to house royal officials. Later additions to the house date from the 17th, 18th and 19th centuries.

The interior of the house has original exposed timber framing. Extensive remains of wall paintings were uncovered in the 1970s by David Sherratt, one of the resident schoolmasters at Berkhamsted School. The paintings are thought to date from the late Tudor or early Jacobean era.

A painted sign hangs outside the house depicting Dean Incent in ecclesiastical vestments, with the arms of the Dean of St Paul's (an initial D above crossed swords) and of the town of Berkhamsted (a castle); behind Incent is Old St Paul's Cathedral, the medieval building that stood until the Great Fire of London of 1666.

The house was listed in 1950 and has undergone some restoration work. It is now a private dwelling and is not normally open to the public. Nikolaus Pevsner described it as "the best house in Berkhamsted".

Immediately in front of Dean Incent's House stands another listed structure, a cast iron red K6 Post Office telephone kiosk in the 1935 design by Sir Giles Gilbert Scott. The telephone box was listed Grade II in 1988.

== See also ==
- 173, High Street, Berkhamsted
- 130–136 Piccott's End
