= Chipperfield =

Coordinates: 51°42′14″N 0°29′26″W

- Village
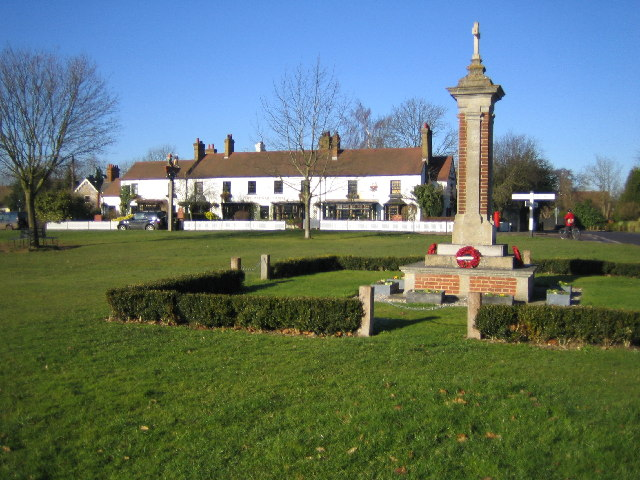
- The Two Brewers, the village green and the war memorial

- Location within Hertfordshire
- Population: 1,753 (2011 Census)
- OS grid reference: TL043016
- District: Dacorum
- Shire county: Hertfordshire
- Region: East
- Country: England
- Sovereign state: United Kingdom
- Post town: KINGS LANGLEY
- Postcode district: WD4
- Dialling code: 01923
- Police: Hertfordshire
- Fire: Hertfordshire
- Ambulance: East of England
- UK Parliament: South West Hertfordshire

Chipperfield is a village and civil parish in the Dacorum district of Hertfordshire, England, approximately 5 mi (8.0 km) southwest of Hemel Hempstead and 5 mi (8.0 km) miles north of Watford. It stands on a chalk plateau at the edge of the Chiltern Hills, between 130 metres (430 ft) and 160 metres (520 ft) above sea level.

The village green is at the centre of Chipperfield on the edge of the 117 acre Chipperfield Common. The rural parish includes the hamlet of Tower Hill.

== History ==
Prehistoric activity in the area is testified by the presence of two tumuli on the common. Besides being burial mounds these may have designated the boundary of lands worked by Bronze Age communities in the Gade and Chess valleys.

For centuries Chipperfield was an outlying settlement of Kings Langley consisting only of scattered houses. The first documentary evidence of the name is found in 1316, when Edward II bequeathed 'the Manor House of Langley the closes adjoining together with the vesture of Chepervillewode for Fewel and other Necessaries' to the Dominican Black Friars.

The name is probably derived from the Anglo-Saxon ceapere meaning a trader together with feld meaning field. This suggests that there was some form of market or trading of goods here in early times.

The Manor House, on the east side of the common, is a late medieval hall house but was extensively rebuilt by Thomas Gulston, before 1591. It is a Grade II* listed building.

By the 1830s Chipperfield was large enough to warrant the building of both Anglican and Baptist churches and became a separate ecclesiastical parish in 1848.

For a number of years the Lords of the Manor were the Blackwell family who were benefactors to the village. Two of the family's sons were killed during World War One. Second Lieutenant Charles Blackwell (4th battalion, Royal Fusiliers) was wounded at the Second Battle of Ypres and died in France in July 1915. Lieutenant William Gordon Blackwell (8th battalion, Royal Fusiliers), the younger of the two brothers, was killed in action during the Battle of the Somme on 5 October 1916. As a memorial the Blackwell family gave the village the village club, which remained a club until recently. It has now been renamed Blackwells and is both a bar and cafe open to the public next to the common.

The names of 38 local men who died in World War One are inscribed on the War Memorial on the village green and repeated on a memorial plaque inside the church. An additional name appears on a war grave in the churchyard. There are also the names of 10 men who died in World War Two.

In 1936 Chipperfield Common was gifted to the local authority to be maintained in consultation with the people of Chipperfield.

Since the end of World War II the village has dramatically expanded with housing estates built during the 1940s and an extensive council estate to the east of Croft Lane built in the 1960s.

In 1963 Chipperfield was split off from Kings Langley and Chipperfield Parish Council was created.

In 1959 the actor and comedian Peter Sellers purchased the Manor House on the east side of the common. He lived there until 1962 attracting many famous stars and film moguls to visit him in the village.

The former U.S. President Jimmy Carter traced his family roots to a John Carter of Jeffery's Farm, situated to the south east of the village.

== Description ==
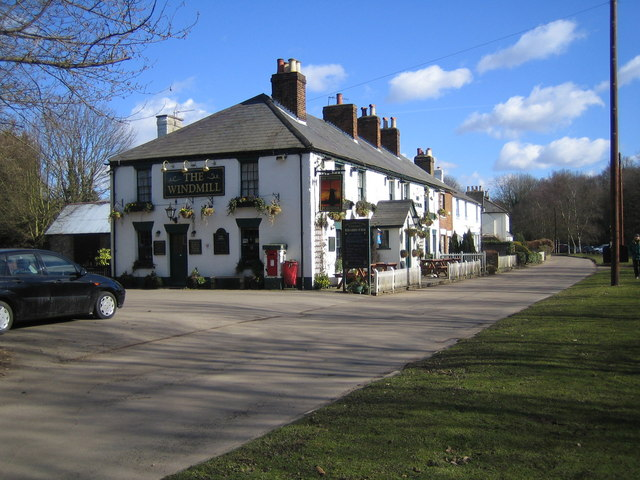
Chipperfield: The Windmill

Perhaps the most significant feature is the common, comprising 47.5 ha (117 acres) of secondary growth woodland to the south of the village. The common is criss-crossed by way-marked paths and contains eight veteran Spanish sweet chestnut trees (Castanea sativa), one having a girth of about 21 feet. They are estimated to date back to the 1600s and believed to be descended from specimens brought from Spain in the Middle Ages. Tradition has it they were planted "for the delight of Isabel of Castile". Isabel of Castile (1355–1392) was the first Duchess of York, the wife of Edmund Langley who lived in the nearby Royal Palace of Kings Langley. The common has several ponds, notably the Apostles Pond, which has twelve lime trees surrounding it and was once a monastery fishpond.

The village cricket club has a green and pavilion on the northern edge of the common. Two Brewers Inn stands adjacent to the common. It was founded by Robert Waller as an ale house in 1799, originally the middle one of a row of three cottages. It eventually took over its neighbours to make a long frontage on the green. A modern hotel extension has been built to the rear. The pub acquired fame as the training quarters for many notable 19th-century prize-fighters such as Jem Mace, Thomas Sayers and Bob Fitzsimmons who sparred in the Club Room and took their runs round the nearby Chipperfield Common. Facilities in the village include two more pubs, a shop, post office, car dealership, a delicatessen, a restaurant and two garden centres.

Chipperfield has three churches: Church of England, Catholic and Baptist. It also has a primary school, St Pauls C of E, with strong ties to the church, which is located adjacent to the school.

Next to the school are the cafe-bar (formerly village club) Blackwell's, and the tennis courts owned by Chipperfield Tennis Club.

Every year, a pantomime is held in the Village Hall, which is organised by the Chipperfield Theatre Group.

There is a lively range of musical activity in the village centred mainly on St Paul's Church, which boasts a fine three manual organ. The choir mounts several choral evensong services each year and a remarkable diversity of concerts, some with orchestra. The Festival of Lessons and Carols at Christmas is accompanied by organ and orchestra and attracts a packed church. Chipperfield Choral Society rehearses in the Village Hall and maintains a popular following at its concerts both at St Paul's and elsewhere, locally. The Cricket Club periodically hosts Jazz concerts.

Chipperfield Corinthians FC football team play in the top division of the Herts County Senior League, with a reserve team in the Herts County Reserve and Development West League.

In order to preserve its rural feeling the village has very little street lighting.
