= Piccotts End =

Village in Hertfordshire, England

Coordinates: 51.770487°N 0.477733°W

- Location within Hertfordshire
- OS grid reference: TL051090
- District: Dacorum
- Shire county: Hertfordshire
- Region: East
- Country: England
- Sovereign state: United Kingdom
- Post town: Hemel Hempstead
- Postcode district: HP1
- Dialling code: 01442
- Police: Hertfordshire
- Fire: Hertfordshire
- Ambulance: East of England
- UK Parliament: Hemel Hempstead

Piccotts End is a village in Hertfordshire, England situated on the upper River Gade. While often mistaken for a hamlet, it became a village when its church – All Saints – was dedicated in 1907 and remained a place of worship until the 1970s. It is in the Dacorum Ward of Gadebridge.

== Description ==
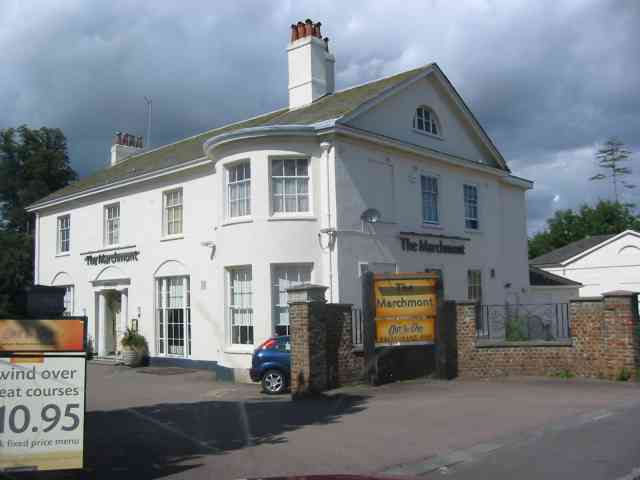
Marchmont House, now a pub

The village is home to several medieval cottages and a number of Georgian and Regency villas. One of these, Marchmont House, is now a pub. There is an extensively restored 19th century watermill. Piccotts End is positioned on the edge of Hemel Hempstead's extensive urban area, but careful planning has kept green space between it and the town.

The Piccotts End Pumping Station operated by Affinity Water takes its name from the village, but is actually located across the Leighton Buzzard Road on a dedicated utility site containing water treatment works and an electricity sub-station.

== Piccotts End Murals ==
In 1953 some unusually fine medieval wall paintings were discovered in some cottages here. The paintings date to between 1470 and 1500 and show a number of religious scenes, including the baptism of Jesus by St John (wearing camel skin complete with head and hoofs) and a scene of the Virgin Mary holding Christ's body in front of the cross. Also depicted are St Peter, St Catherine of Alexandria with her wheel and sword and St Margaret of Antioch emerging from the belly of the dragon. It is believed that these wall paintings show a link to the 'heretical' Cathar beliefs of southern France and adjacent areas of Catalonia and northern Italy. The building was also found to have a hidden room in the roof, suggesting it was a priest hole and an Elizabethan painted room in the next door cottage. In 1827 the same building had been converted into the West Herts Infirmary, the first cottage hospital, by Sir Astley Cooper, providing free medical services.
