= Flamstead =

Village in Hertfordshire, England

Coordinates: 51.81874°N 0.43744°W

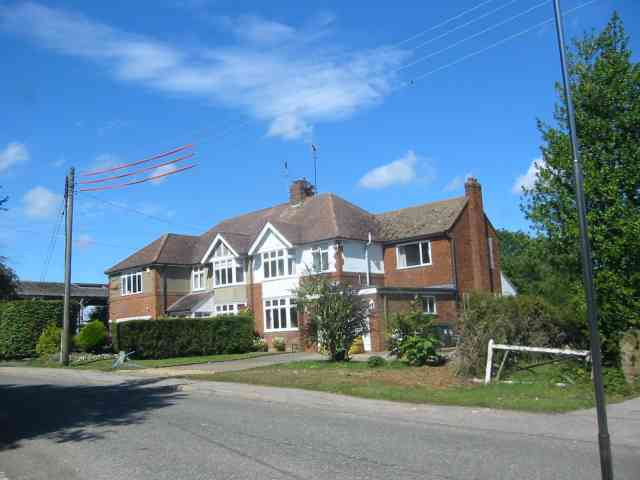
- Houses in Singlets Lane, Flamstead

- Location within Hertfordshire
- Population: 1,551 (2021 Census)
- OS grid reference: TL078145
- Civil parish: Flamstead
- District: Dacorum
- Shire county: Hertfordshire
- Region: East
- Country: England
- Sovereign state: United Kingdom
- Post town: ST ALBANS
- Postcode district: AL3
- Dialling code: 01582
- Police: Hertfordshire
- Fire: Hertfordshire
- Ambulance: East of England
- UK Parliament: Harpenden and Berkhamsted

Flamstead is a village and civil parish in north-west Hertfordshire, England, near the junction of the A5 and the M1 motorway (junction 9). At the 2021 Census, the parish had a population of 1,551.

The name is thought by some historians to derive from Verulamstead. The village stands on a ridge above the River Ver, which runs along its northern side; to the south it extends downhill towards the adjoining hamlet of Trowley Bottom.

Flamstead was first recorded in 1006 and appears in the Domesday Book of 1086. In the Middle Ages it was sufficiently significant to hold a market and fair. It is now primarily a dormitory village for nearby towns, with local bus connections providing access to surrounding areas.

== Geography ==
Flamstead is situated in the Chiltern Hills in south-west Hertfordshire, approximately 4 miles (6 km) north-west of Hemel Hempstead and 5 miles (8 km) south-east of Harpenden. The village lies close to the boundary with Bedfordshire and is located near the A5 (Watling Street), a historic Roman road.

The settlement is set on elevated ground overlooking the surrounding Gade Valley and is characterised by a predominantly rural landscape of farmland and woodland. The River Ver rises to the north-east of the village and flows through the parish before joining the River Colne.

Flamstead forms part of the Dacorum borough and lies within the Hertfordshire Green Belt, which helps to preserve its rural setting and limit urban expansion.

== Buildings ==
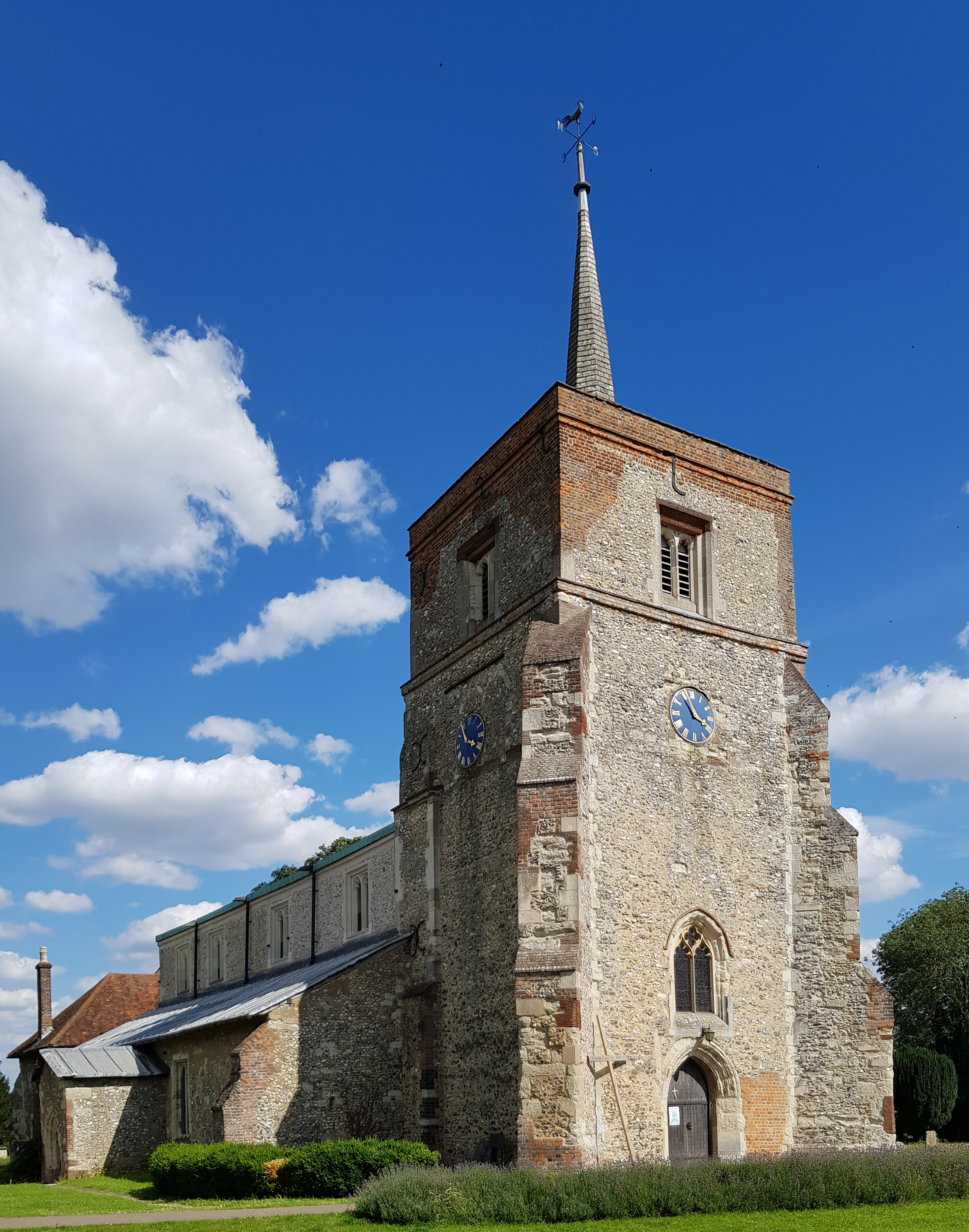
St Leonard's Church, topped by its Hertfordshire spike spire

From a distance the village is dominated by the parish church of St Leonard, with its characteristic "Hertfordshire spike" spire. St Leonard's (Church of England) is believed to stand on the site of a ninth-century Saxon chapel, though the oldest parts of the present structure date from around 1140. Features of interest include medieval wall paintings, the Saunders Memorial of 1670, and a fifteenth-century rood screen. A seventeenth-century painted wooden panel commemorating George Cordell was stolen in 1996 and discovered by an Australian researcher in an online auction and returned to the church in 2026. The village also has a Methodist church.

Flamstead retains a largely linear High Street settlement pattern, with many historic buildings fronting the main road. Other notable buildings in Flamstead include the almshouses in the High Street, built in 1669; the Three Blackbirds pub opposite (one of three in the village), partly dating from the sixteenth century; and several cottages of similar age. The village contains a mixture of timber-framed and brick cottages dating mainly from the 16th to 18th centuries. Flamstead has 65 listed buildings.

Flamstead has a pre-school and a primary school, though older local children have to travel to secondary schools elsewhere in Hertfordshire. The present school dates from the late 1950s, while the former school building adjacent to the churchyard is now used as a pre-school and village hall.

Beechwood Park School, now a preparatory school, was once the site of a Benedictine nunnery and then a Tudor mansion. It lies in the parish, though it is closer to the neighbouring village of Markyate. Beechwood Park gave its name to a song by the Zombies, written by the group's bassist Chris White, who grew up in Markyate.

== History ==
=== Roman Era ===
The parish of Flamstead is situated along the route of the Old Watling Street, an ancient Roman road. The modern A5 road follows a similar path, though it runs closer to the River Ver. In 2008, a significant Roman temple complex, previously undiscovered, was unearthed by Time Team near Watling Street at Friar's Wash. This complex is believed to have been associated with Verulamium (St. Albans). Archaeological evidence, including a coin dating to 98 AD, suggests an earlier building of unknown purpose was constructed on the site during the reign of Emperor Trajan. The main temple complex was built in the 3rd century and remained in use until at least 341 AD. The excavation was featured in an episode of Time Team broadcast on January 4, 2009.

=== Saxon and Norman Eras ===
The village of Flamstead itself developed during the Saxon era, situated away from the Roman temple site. While Flamstead is first documented in 1006, it likely existed in the 9th century. The current St Leonard's Church stands on the site of a 9th-century chapel, with the existing structure dating back to 1140, during the Norman era.

=== Medieval to Modern Periods ===
A significant portion of Flamstead's current buildings were constructed between the 15th and 17th centuries. Notable examples include the almshouses, built in 1669, and numerous cottages from the late 17th century. The church also features many paintings from the 15th to 17th centuries.

Since 2002, Flamstead has hosted an annual Scarecrow Festival, which raises funds for the church's upkeep and local charities. In 2014, the village introduced a literary festival called 'Books in the Belfry', which has attracted well-known authors and raises money for the restoration of medieval wall-paintings in the village church.

In June 2023, two of the village's three pubs, The Three Blackbirds and The Spotted Dog, closed on the same day, leaving The Rose & Crown as the sole remaining pub. Both pubs subsequently reopened, restoring the village’s three public houses.
