= Beechwood Park (mansion) =

Beechwood Park School
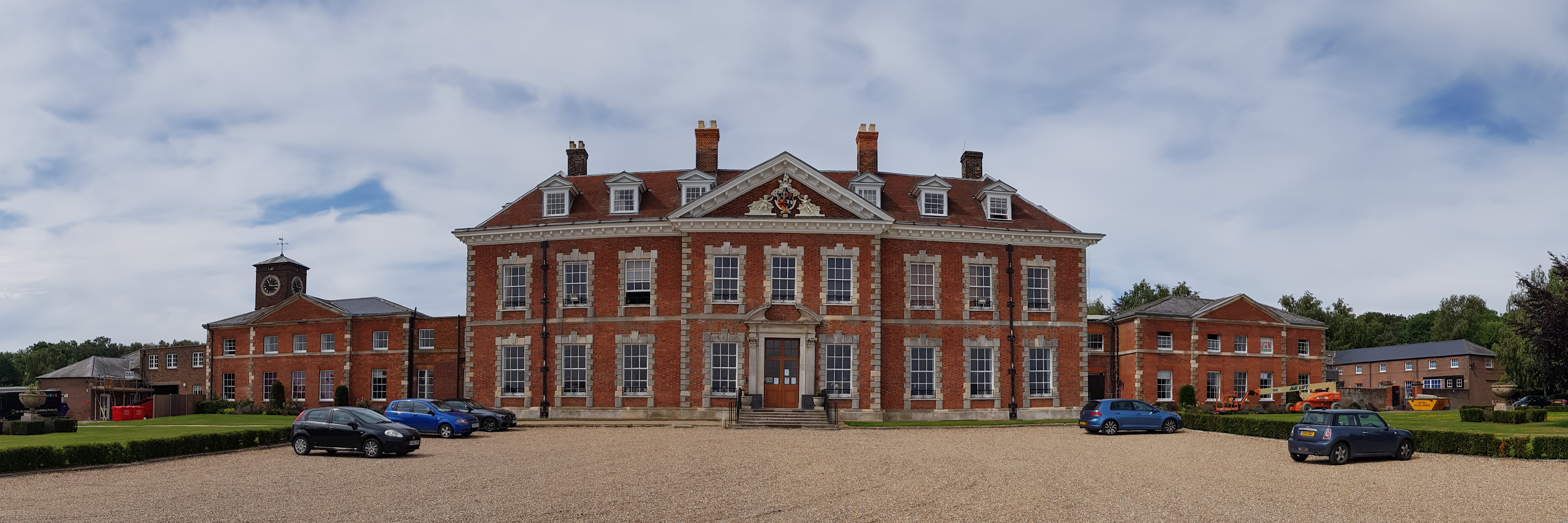

Location
- Markyate; St Albans, Hertfordshire, AL3 8AW; United Kingdom
- 51.81917°N 0.48477°W

Information
- Type: Preparatory day and boarding
- Religious affiliation: Church of England
- Established: 1964
- Local authority: Hertfordshire
- Department for Education URN: 117620 Tables
- Headmaster: Christian Pritchard
- Gender: Coeducational
- Age: 3 to 13
- Enrolment: c.500 pupils
- Houses: 4
- Colours: Navy Blue, Maroon
- Website: http://www.beechwoodpark.com

Beechwood Park was a mansion, near Markyate, Hertfordshire, England. It now houses Beechwood Park School.

== History ==
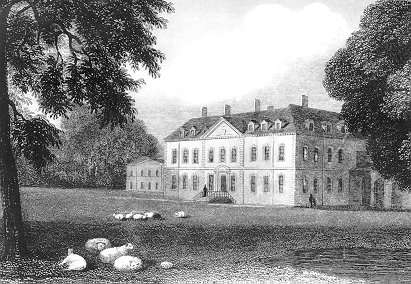
Beechwood Park in the early 18th century shortly after the completion of the new facade

Ralph de Tony held this site, in the manor of Flamstead, as recorded in the Domesday Book of 1086. As King of England, William the Conqueror would have expected this new Lord of the Manor to protect St Albans Abbey and its pilgrims. Ralph de Tony's grandson Roger IV de Toesny then founded a Benedictine nunnery, St Giles in the Wood Priory, Flamstead, in the middle of the 12th century. The Dissolution of the Monasteries resulted in the destruction of the nunnery of St Giles in 1537.

The Manor House on the site was used frequently by Henry VIII and later by Edward VI. In 1537, the site was let to Sir John Tregonwell by Henry VIII. Shortly afterwards, however, the king granted it by Letters Patent dated 30 September 1539, to Richard Page and Dame Elizabeth.

The property subsequently passed first to George Ferrers, and then in 1628 to Thomas Saunders of Long Marston. In 1698 his great granddaughter Anne Saunders married Sir Edward Sebright, who belonged to a wealthy Worcestershire family, establishing a family connection for the next two and a half centuries. One of six children, only Anne herself survived childhood. A monument in St Leonard's Church, Flamstead, is a memorial attributed to William Stanton (c.1690) to the early death of her brothers and sisters. Edward Sebright moved from Worcestershire to his bride's home in Hertfordshire, and set about transforming the Tudor building that he found there.

Further changes (e.g. the addition of much of the façade and of the two wings) were made in the 18th century; a Library was added at the start of the 19th century, and the courtyard covered over in 1854 (it is now the Great Hall). In 1880 the tenant was Mr W.B. Greenfield, who established there in that year one of the three leading herds of pedigree Aberdeen Angus cattle in England. In 1908 he was the tenant of Haynes Park, Bedfordshire.

The Sebrights fell on hard times after World War I, and eventually relinquished the estate. The Second World War brought changes to Beechwood. Firstly the Sebright family, with the requisitioning of the house by the government, moved into a smaller house that they owned, nearby. The main house became the headquarters for Spillers Foods, which had evacuated from London. An airfield was built in the grounds to land damaged or obsolete planes. Specially constructed hangars were used to house these planes and care was taken to camouflage the strip and the hangars. At the end of the war the house first became a girls' school, which eventually closed in 1961 due to lack of funds. A new preparatory school was opened in 1964 which continues to this day.

== Beechwood Park School ==
Beechwood Park School, is a co-educational independent day and flexi boarding school in Hertfordshire in England, UK for children age 3 to 13 (Year 8). It is set on the site of an old mansion house with extensions put in over the last 50 years including the Junior Department (now known as Pre-Prep), Sports Hall and Performance Hall. More recent developments include the onsite Woodlands Nursery, which opened in September 2015 and also the covered swimming pool complex, officially opened by the swimmer Karen Pickering in July 2015.

=== School history ===
Beechwood Park School was formed in 1964 by the amalgamation of two much older prep schools, Shirley House (in Watford) and Heath Brow School (in Hemel Hempstead). By 1961 the buildings and estate of Beechwood Park were in a terrible state of neglect and disrepair. It was apparently close to demolition when it went on the market in 1961. The Stewart family who owned Shirley House put in a successful bid and decided to restore it. Shortly afterwards Group Captain Peter Stewart (the brother of a former Head of Shirley House) became Estates Manager of Beechwood, and he is regarded as the present school's true founder. The school's first headmaster was Alan Mould. The school roll has since increased to about 500 pupils. Pupils at the school are divided into four houses, named Tudor, Saunders, Sebright and Stewart in homage to the history of the school and its buildings.

From its opening in 1964 the school enrolled only boys and was known as "Beechwood Park Preparatory School for Boys". Having admitted the first girls in the 1980s, the school became fully co-educational in September 1993.

=== Popular culture ===
The school was used as a location for the film The Dirty Dozen in 1967.

The school was the subject of the 1967 song "Beechwood Park" by St. Albans band the Zombies on their Odessey and Oracle album. The song's writer and Zombies' bass guitarist, Chris White lived at nearby Markyate.

=== Alumni ===
- Martin Bayfield, rugby player
- Julian Bliss, clarinettist
- Alan Duncan, politician
- James Fox, art historian and TV presenter
- Anna Henderson, cyclist, Olympic silver medallist

== See also ==
- RAF Beechwood Park
