= Great Gaddesden =

Village in Hertfordshire, England

Coordinates: 51.791°N 0.510°W

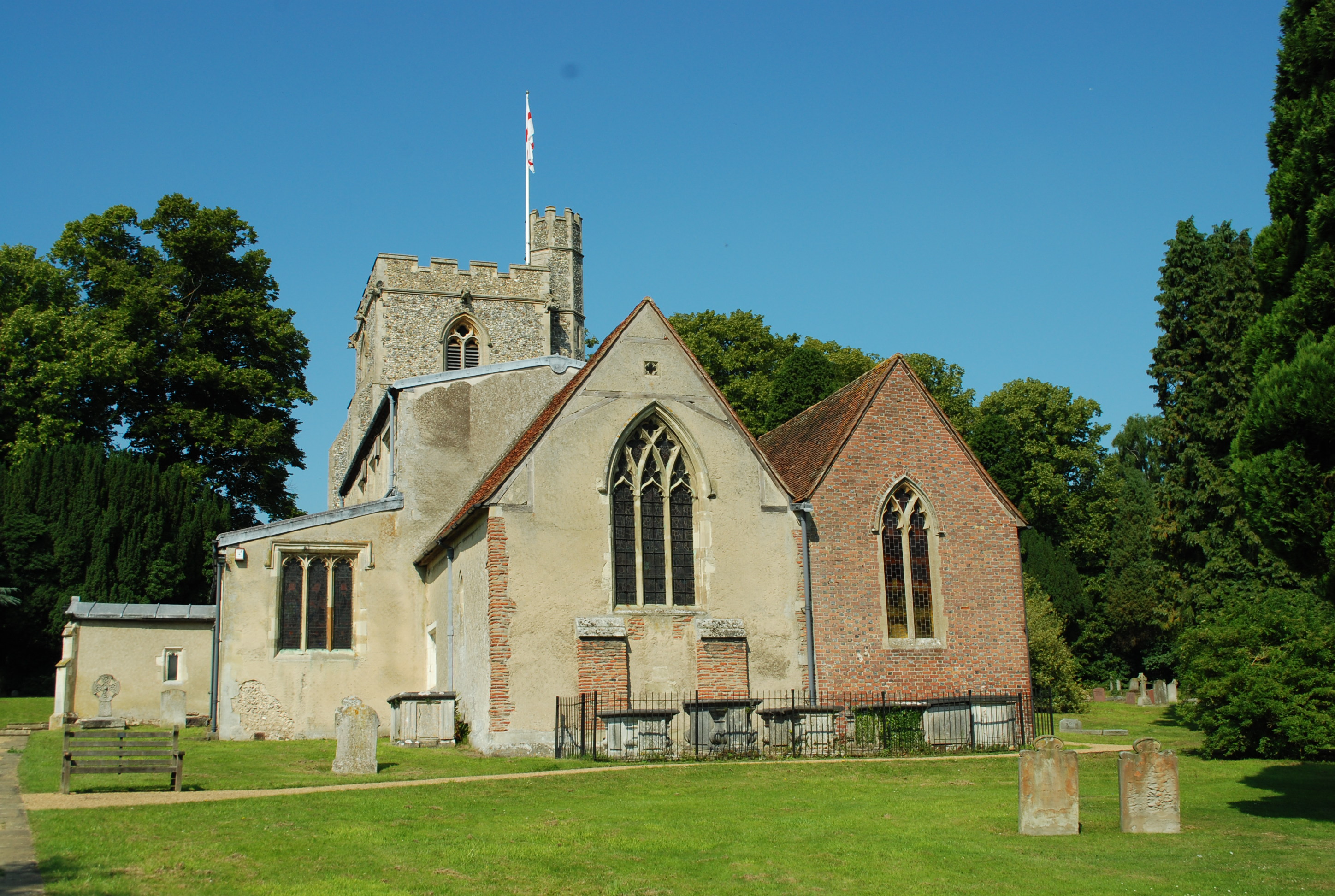
- Church of St. John the Baptist

- Location within Hertfordshire
- Population: 972 (2011 Census including Ballingdon Bottom)
- OS grid reference: TL030113
- Civil parish: Great Gaddesden
- District: Dacorum
- Shire county: Hertfordshire
- Region: East
- Country: England
- Sovereign state: United Kingdom
- Post town: HEMEL HEMPSTEAD
- Postcode district: HP1, HP2
- Dialling code: 01442
- Police: Hertfordshire
- Fire: Hertfordshire
- Ambulance: East of England
- UK Parliament: Harpenden and Berkhamsted

Great Gaddesden /ˈɡædzdən/ is a village and civil parish in Dacorum Hundred in Hertfordshire, England. It is located in the Chiltern Hills, north of Hemel Hempstead. The parish borders Flamstead, Hemel Hempstead, Nettleden and Little Gaddesden and also Studham in Bedfordshire.

The Church of St. John the Baptist was probably the site of a pre-Christian sanctuary. The church shows features of every period since the 12th century. Part of the chancel with Roman bricks dates back to the early 12th century. The old church was extended by the south aisle in the 13th century and the north aisle in the 14th century, while the west tower was built in the 15th century and the north chapel in the 18th.

The medieval convent of St Margaret's stood northwest of the village. For a while the site served as a WW2 Royal Canadian Air Force transit camp and later a boarding school for children with disabilities. It is now a Theravadin Buddhist monastery of Thai Forest Tradition, the Amaravati Buddhist Monastery, complete with temple.

Gaddesden Place, east of the village, was built from 1768 to 1773 for the Halsey family. It is surrounded by a large park. In 1905 a fire destroyed the interior of the main house.

The River Gade takes its name from Gaddesden (or vice-versa). Its clear water is used for watercress beds along the river, and at Water End, south of Great Gaddesden, is an old corn mill. The bridge over the river at Water End has a medieval appearance but was built in the 19th century.

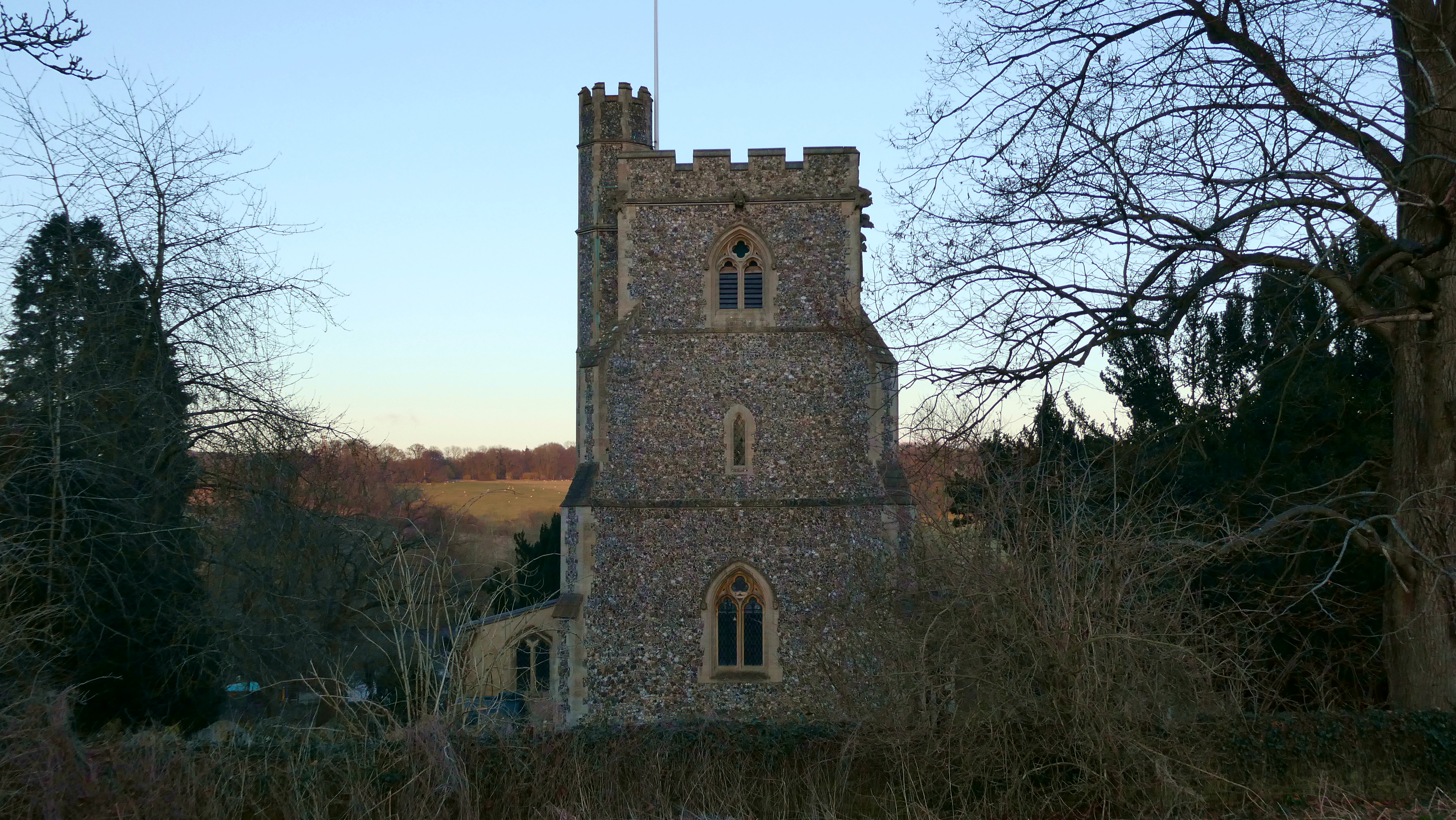
St. John the Baptist tower
