= Tring Market House =

Municipal building in Tring, Hertfordshire, England

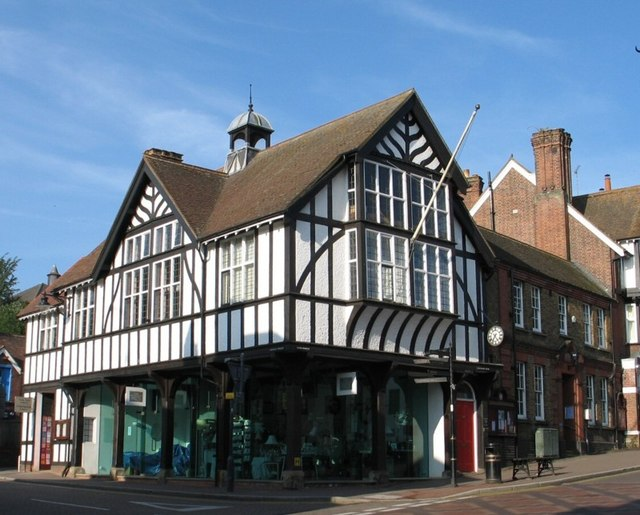
- Tring Market House

- Shown in Hertfordshire
- 51.7934°N 0.6625°W
- Location: 61 High Street, Tring

History
- Built: 1898

Site notes
- Architect: William Huckvale
- Architectural style: Tudor Revival style

Listed Building – Grade II
- Official name: The Market House
- Designated: 29 May 1986
- Reference no.: 1083558

Tring Market House is a municipal building in the High Street, Tring, Hertfordshire, England. The structure, which is the meeting place of Tring Town Council, is a Grade II listed building.

== History ==
The first market house in Tring was a modest mid-17th century rectangular building in Church Yard, and it stood between the parish church of St Peter and St Paul and the High Street. It was built on wooden stilts and was equipped with a pillory and a lock-up for petty criminals on the ground floor.

A public meeting was convened by Tring Urban District Council on 23 April 1897 at the town's Victoria Hall, to consider how to celebrate the Diamond Jubilee of Queen Victoria. The meeting voted in favour of demolishing the old market house and building a new one on part of the same site. A committee was appointed to pursue the scheme, and it raised the idea with Lord Rothschild, who owned the manorial rights to the market, and whose country home was Tring Park Mansion. He supported removing the old market house, but said that he would give a much more generous donation towards the cost of a new building if a new site elsewhere could be found, leaving the old site in Church Yard to become an open space. The committee therefore found a new site about 130 metres (140 yd) west of the old building. The new site was in a prominent position at the junction of High Street and Akeman Street, and was owned by Thomas Elliman, who was willing to sell the land.

The new building was financed by public subscription. The land was purchased for £900 and the building cost £1,056; the Rothschild family donated £1,203 towards the total. The architect was William Huckvale, who designed many buildings for Lord Rothschild in Tring around this time. The building was designed in the Tudor Revival style, and was built using timber frame construction. Construction began in 1898 and the building was formally opened on 13 July 1900. Lord Rothschild donated the manorial rights to the market to Tring Urban District Council at the same time. Work on demolishing the old market house began the following week.

As first built, the building comprised an arcaded market place on the ground floor which was open to both High Street and Akeman Street. At the southern end of the ground floor was an ante-room and offices. The upper storey was a large room intended for use as a corn exchange. The design involved an asymmetrical main frontage with three bays facing onto the High Street; the left hand two bays were open but the right hand bay contained a doorway with a fanlight giving access to a stairway leading to the first floor. On the first floor, which was jettied over the pavement, there was a large oriel window with a gable above.

The building was designed to serve as a market; it was not initially intended that it would become council offices. One of the ground floor offices was used by the council's surveyor from late 1901, but otherwise the council held its meetings at the vestry hall in Church Yard and other office functions were carried out at the offices of Arthur Vaisey, the solicitor who served as the council's clerk. The market house was not a commercial success, and the building had ceased to be used as a market by 1910. At a council meeting in June 1910 it was said that the open lower part of the building had become a public nuisance, whilst the upper part was no longer used and the whole thing was "an expensive and useless building". It was decided to enclose the open ground floor to serve as the town's fire station, and to make alterations to the upper floor to make it more suitable for meetings. The council used the building for its regular monthly meetings from October 1910 onwards.

During the First World War, the building was used as a depot for hospital stores. The council also temporarily moved its meetings back to the vestry hall between 1916 and 1919 due to the wartime lighting regulations that were imposed under the Defence of the Realm Act 1914; it was easier to darken the windows at the vestry hall than the large windows of the market house.

Apart from the surveyor's office in the market house, the council's other administrative offices remained at their clerk's office until 1933. On the resignation of the clerk in November 1933 the council agreed to make alterations to the council chamber in the market house to allow it to house the other office functions and to give the new clerk an office in the building. In 1937 the principal rooms were described as being the council chamber and the offices of the town clerk and town surveyor.

The market house continued to serve as the headquarters of the urban district council until 1952, when the council moved to the former Tring Park estate office at 9 High Street. In 1974 Tring Urban District was abolished, with the town then coming under Dacorum Borough Council, based in Hemel Hempstead. A new Tring Town Council was created to cover the former urban district, and the town council returned to Market House, taking over the first floor as its offices and meeting place, while the ground floor was occupied by the local information centre and various retail users including, since January 2009, a homewares shop.

== Artworks ==
Works of art in the market house include paintings by the local artist, Arthur Hedges, depicting both the old market house in Church Square and the new market house as it was when it was first built.
