= John Brown (brewer) =

English brewer, born 1795

- Born: 31 December 1795; Okeford Fitzpaine, Dorset
- Died: 23 October 1890 (aged 94); Tring, Hertfordshire
- Occupation: Brewer

John Brown (31 December 1795 – 23 October 1890) was a brewer in Tring, Hertfordshire. Born in Okeford Fitzpaine in Dorset, he moved to Tring in 1826. His brewery was in Tring High Street, and he built several public houses in the area, at a period when the coming of the railway was advantageous to the business. (The brewery is not to be confused with the present-day Tring Brewery).

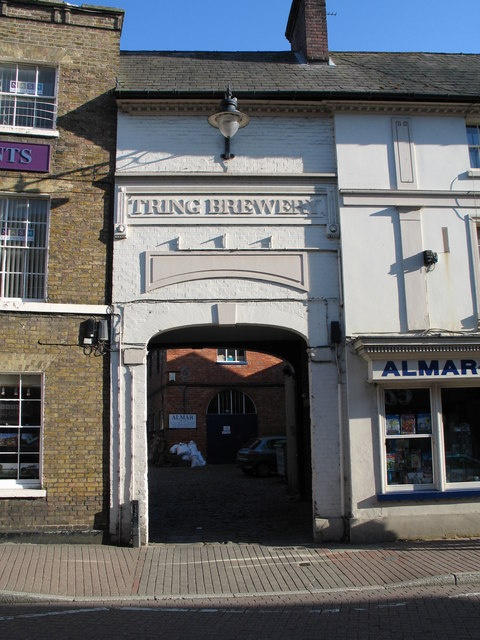
The brewery in Tring High Street

== Coming of the railway ==
In the 1830s, a railway line, of the London and Birmingham Railway, was built, which passed near the town. Since it used shallow gradients, a cutting was created through chalk hills near Tring between 1834 and 1837. The cutting was the largest created at that time, being 4 km long and 12 m deep. It was mostly dug manually. The navvies employed in its construction provided business for breweries in Tring, including that of John Brown.

During the 1830s he built several pubs in the area, which had a distinctive architectural style. In Tring, these included the Britannia (the present Norfolk House) and the King's Arms. The King's Arms is away from the town centre: John Brown expected that the town would expand with the coming of the railway, and that the pub would be in a busy area; however, the expansion did not happen as he expected. Another of his buildings is near to the railway station about two miles from Tring; it was built in 1838 under arrangement with the London and Birmingham Railway Company. Its name was originally the Harcourt Arms, after the Harcourt family who owned Pendley Manor; it was renamed, some time between 1845 and 1851, the Royal Hotel.

In 1851 John was a farmer and a wine and spirit merchant, as well as a brewer; in 1881 he was employing nine men at the brewery.

== The end of the family brewery ==
In later years the brewery was run by John's son John Herbert Brown; he and his brother Frederick William took over when John died in 1890. However, John Herbert died in 1896, and in 1898 Frederick William sold the brewery, with nine freehold public houses, to Locke and Smith of Berkhamsted.

A stained glass window in Tring parish church, on the east wall of the south aisle, is dedicated to the memory of John Brown and his brother William Brown, who founded a land agent business in the town.

== Horseriding ==
He was an enthusiastic horseman. In 1844 he established the Tring Steeplechase; he owned one of the horses in the inaugural race. The event was reported in The Sunday Times of 21 January 1844; he is described there as "a gentleman well known to all the sporting men of the neighbourhood as one of the most active and zealous among them in supporting all measures connected with the pleasures of the chase." Notable sporting people associated with the race, including Baron Rothschild, met before and after the event at the Harcourt Arms, where John Brown was the host.

== Buildings of John Brown's Tring Brewery ==
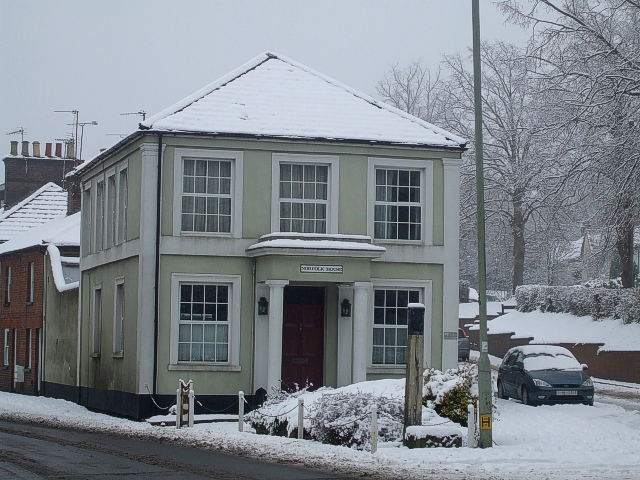
The Britannia public house in Tring (the present-day Norfolk House)

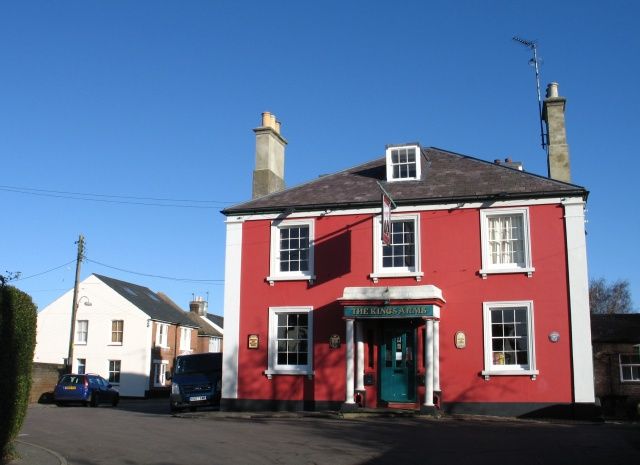
The King's Arms in Tring

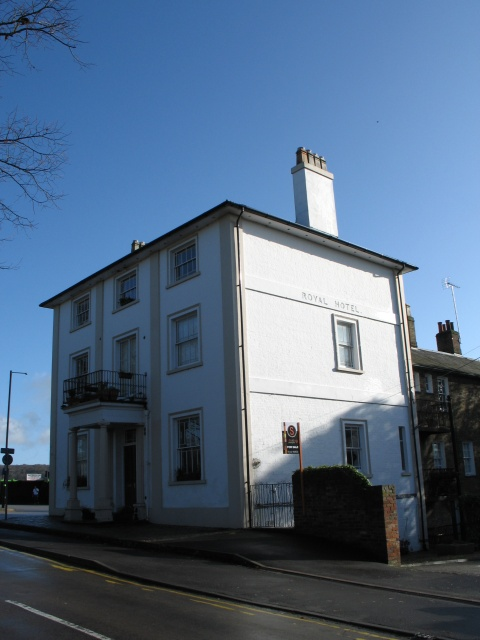
The Harcourt Arms, later the Royal Hotel, at Tring Station (about 2 miles from Tring town centre)
