= Tring Park School for the Performing Arts =

Coordinates: 51.79285°N 0.65635°W

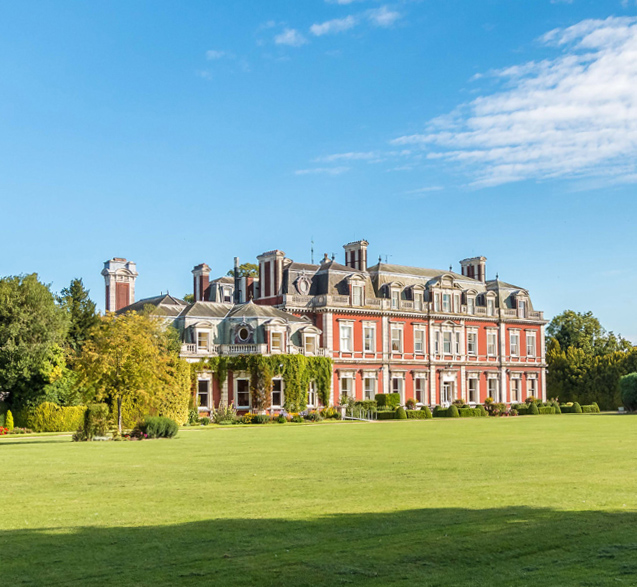

Location
- Tring Park; Tring, Hertfordshire, HP23 5LX; United Kingdom

Information
- Type: Private day and boarding
- Established: 1939
- Founders: Grace Cone & Olive Ripman
- Specialist: Performing Arts
- Department for Education URN: 117618 Tables
- President: Dione Grimston, Countess of Verulam
- Principal: Simon Larter-Evans
- Gender: Co-education
- Age: 8 to 19
- Enrolment: 355
- Accreditation: CDET
- Website: http://www.tringpark.com

Tring Park School or Tring Park School for the Performing Arts is a co-educational, independent day and boarding school in Tring, Hertfordshire, England. The school combines academia with vocational courses in the performing arts for pupils aged 7–19. All prospective pupils are required to attend an audition to determine admission, with the exception of those in the Prep School. Around one in every seven applicants are successful.

The school comprises a Prep School, a Lower School, a Middle School and a Sixth Form. Originally known as the Arts Educational School, Tring Park, it was founded as the sister school of the Arts Educational Schools, London. In 2009, it became independent of the London school and was renamed Tring Park School for the Performing Arts.

Tring Park School charges up to £49,536 per year (£16,512 per term, with three terms in the academic year). However, it is one of only twenty-one schools in the U.K. selected to allocate Dance and Drama Awards and one of eight schools selected to allocate Music and Dance Scheme Awards, both government funded scholarship schemes established to subsidise the cost of professional dance and drama training for talented pupils at leading institutions. The school also offers its own scholarships awarded exclusively in recognition of talent during auditions.

== Overview ==
Tring Park School for the Performing Arts is an independent, co-educational boarding and day school for pupils aged 8–19 years. The school is divided into 4 levels consisting of a preparatory school (years 3–6), a Lower School (years 7–9), a Middle School (years 10–11), and an Upper School/Sixth Form (years 12–13). Recognised as a specialist provider of vocational training in the performing arts, students combine their academic studies with a specialised course of one of the following; dance, acting, commercial music or musical theatre. Thus, vocational studies are supported by a full academic syllabus from prep to A-level.

== History ==
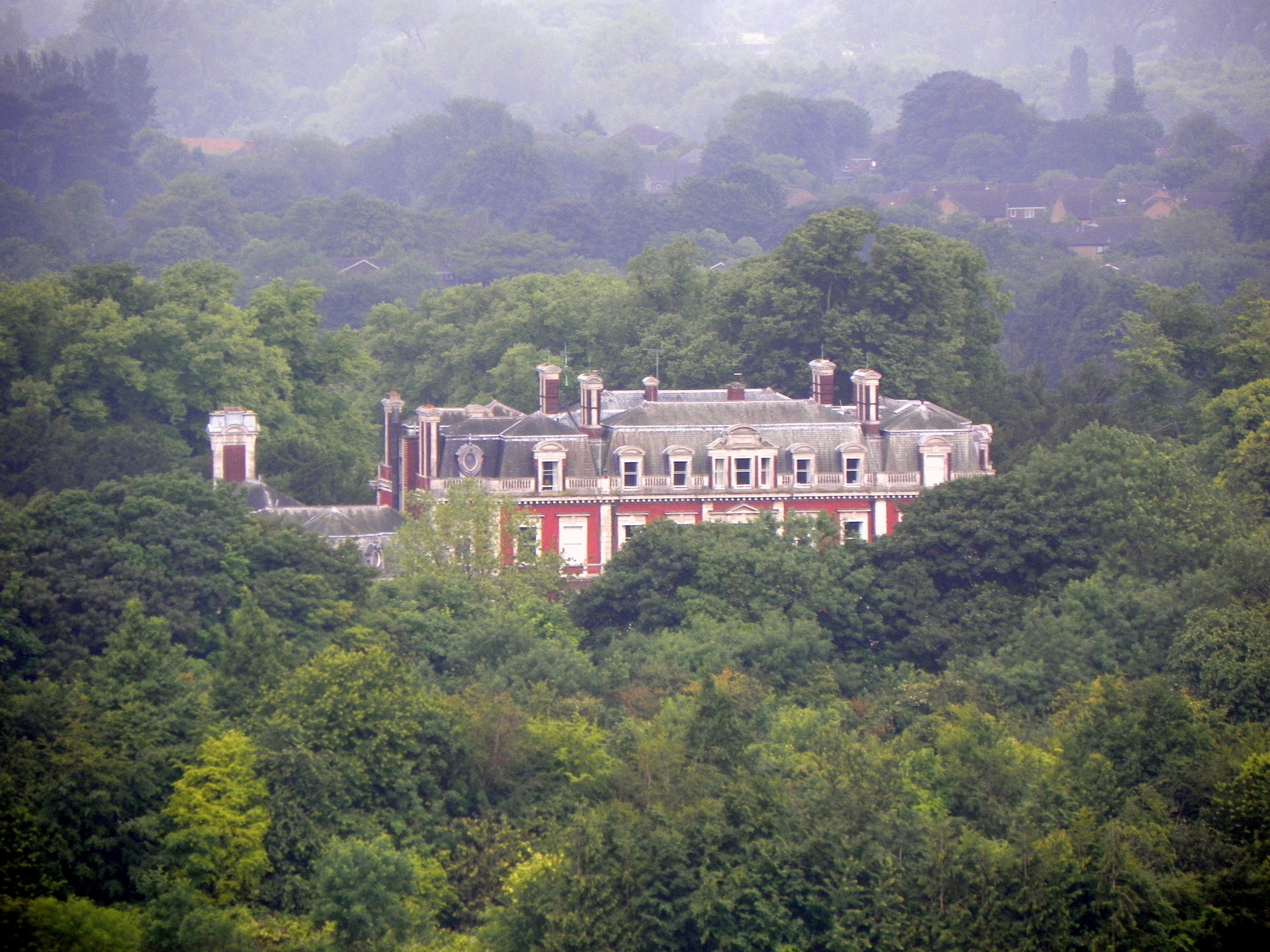
Tring Park Mansion viewed from a nearby hill.

The school was first founded in 1939 and was originally known as the Cone–Ripman School. It was formed as a result of a merger between the Cone School of Dancing founded in 1919 by Grace Cone, and the Ripman School founded in 1922 by Olive Ripman.

The schools were initially in two parts, the Cone studio located above Lilley & Skinner's shoe shop on Oxford Street and the Ripman in Baker Street. Cone-Ripman School was then based in premises at Stratford Place in London, but following the outbreak of World War II, it was relocated to Tring in Hertfordshire, using various rented buildings. In 1941, the school reopened in London, but a second school continued to operate in Tring. In 1945, the Rothschild Bank vacated the mansion at Tring Park, which had been its temporary base during the war, and the Rothschild family permitted the school to use the premises on a permanent basis. Tring Park remains the school's sole campus to this day and in 1947, the school was renamed the Arts Educational School, Tring Park, with the London school becoming the Arts Educational School, London.

For many years, the school's president was the prima ballerina assoluta, Dame Alicia Markova. After her death, Leopold David de Rothschild became president and the vice presidents are Irek Mukhamedov and Howard Goodall .

== History of the mansion ==
The current Tring Park Mansion was built to a design of Sir Christopher Wren in 1685, for Sir Henry Guy.

Sir William Gore, Lord Mayor of London, bought the house in 1705 and it remained in his family for two generations. In 1786, it was sold to Sir Drummond Smith, a London banker, who refurbished the interior in Georgian style and remodelled the park in the fashion made popular by Capability Brown. William Kay, a Manchester textile magnate, bought the estate in 1823.

In 1838, Nathan de Rothschild began renting Tring Park as a summer residence. When the property was sold in 1872, Lionel de Rothschild bought it as a wedding present for his son, Sir Nathaniel (later Lord) de Rothschild. Lord Rothschild's family grew up and lived at Tring Park until the death of the dowager Lady Rothschild in 1935.

The house was used by the NM Rothschild & Sons bank during World War II before being taken over by the Arts Educational School in 1945.

== Filming location ==
Tring Park School has been a filming location for multiple film and television productions. Some of the most notable include;

- Avengers: Age of Ultron (2015). The schools mansion was used to portray a Russian ballet school, seen most notably during the Red Room scene – Black Widow's vision.
- Judy (2019). Directed by Rupert Goold, the school was used to depict Judy Garland's time in England.
- The Serpent (2021). Hertfordshire filming begin in August 2020 after a five month postponement due to COVID-19.
- The Flash (2023). The schools mansion building staircase was used to portray Batman's Wayne Manor.
- Ghostbusters: Frozen Empire (2024). Featured as the 'Manhattan Adventures Society' interior, along with the lobby and staircase.

== Notable alumni ==
- Dame Julie Andrews, Actress best known for films Mary Poppins and The Sound of Music
- Joe Ashman, Actor known for Free Rein, Doctors and Get Even
- Dame Beryl Bainbridge, novelist
- Jordan Bolger, actor best known for Peaky Blinders, The 100 and The Woman King
- Sarah Brightman, Operatic singer, dancer and actress
- Charlie Bruce (Charlotte), Jazz Dancer/West End performer (Dirty Dancing) and winner of BBC1's So You Think You Can Dance Season 1, (2010)
- Anna Carteret, Actress best known for her role of Kate Longton in BBC's Juliet Bravo
- Emma Cunniffe, Actress best known for BBC's television series The Lakes
- Bart Edwards, Actor best known for television series Lykkeland
- Jessica Brown Findlay, Actress best known for television series Downton Abbey as a lead character: Lady Sybil Crawley (2010/11)
- Regan Gascoigne, Dancer, singer and actor. Winner of the 14th season of Dancing on Ice (2022)
- John Gilpin, Classical ballet dancer, founder member of Festival Ballet (now English National Ballet)
- Louise Griffiths, Songwriter, singer and actress best known for BBC TV's Fame Academy (2003)
- Ella Henderson, singer/songwriter and Brit Award winner
- Lily James, Actress best known for Downton Abbey, War & Peace (2016), Cinderella (2015) and Baby Driver (2017)
- Carly Hopkinson, classical/opera singer/songwriter and Classic Brit Awards nominee
- Glynis Johns, Actress, dancer, musician and singer
- Lesley Judd, Former television co-presenter of Blue Peter
- Aimee Kelly, Actress best known in leading roles of Maddy Smith in CBBC's Wolfblood and Kayla Richards in film Sket (2011)
- Stephanie Lawrence, musical theatre actress, celebrated star of Andrew Lloyd Webber's Evita and original cast lead of Starlight Express
- Michael Learned, Actress best known for her role in television series The Waltons
- Zienia Merton, Actress played Sandra Benes in television series Space: 1999
- Thandiwe Newton, Hollywood actress and star of films such as The Pursuit of Happyness, Run Fatboy Run, Mission: Impossible 2 and Crash
- Amy Nuttall, Actress and singer best known for West End musical Guys and Dolls, television series Emmerdale and Downton Abbey (2011)
- Rupert Pennefather, Principal Dancer of The Royal Ballet
- Caroline Quentin, Actress and comedian best known for television series Men Behaving Badly, Blue Murder and BBC's Life of Riley
- Daisy Ridley, actress best known for her leading role of Rey in the Star Wars sequel trilogy
- Jane Seymour, actress best known for playing Bond girl Solitaire in the film Live and Let Die, and the television series Dr. Quinn, Medicine Woman
- Valerie Singleton, former BBC TV co-presenter of Blue Peter, Nationwide, The Money Programme.
- Geraldine Somerville, actress known for her role of Lily Potter in the Harry Potter films and the film Gosford Park
- Aeronwy Thomas, writer/translator of Italian poetry and daughter of Dylan Thomas
- Claire Trévien, poet, author of The Shipwrecked House
- Freya Skye, singer, songwriter, actress. United Kingdom's 2022 Junior Eurovision contestant. Known for her role as Nova in Disney's Zombies 4: Dawn of the Vampires.
- Evie Templeton, actress, known for her role as Agnes DeMille in the Netflix series Wednesday (2025)
- Eline Van der Velden, comedian, writer, actress and producer best known for creating the AI-generated "actress" Tilly Norwood.
- Skye Lourie, actress best known for her role as Elizabeth of Weymouth in the miniseries The Pillars of the Earth
- Sabrina Bartlett, actress known for roles in the BBC One miniseries The Passing Bells and Bridgerton on Netflix.
- Jessica Revell, actress and singer known for her role as Mandy "Elektra" Perkins in Tracy Beaker Returns and in the BBC spin-off series The Dumping Ground.
- Carly Paoli, classical singer

== Bibliography ==
- Stevenson, Ben (December 2006). "Ben Stevenson: finding relaxation within the riqor of ballet". Dance Magazine. 83 (12). Archived from the original on 19 January 2012 – via FindArticles.
- Texas Ballet Theater
