= Side Pocket (disambiguation) =

Side Pocket is a 1986 pocket billiards video game.

Side Pocket or side pocket may also refer to:

- a side pocket on a billiard table
- a mechanism in a hedge fund to compartmentalize certain assets
- Side Pocket for a Toad, a beer by Tring Brewery
- Side pocket mandrel, containing a side pocket, used in oil and gas well completion
- "Side Pocket", a 1968 episode of Ironside
- "Side Pocket", a song from the 1970 film They Call Me Mister Tibbs!

== See also ==
- Pocket, a receptacle in clothing to hold small items
