= Rupert Pennefather =

British ballet dancer

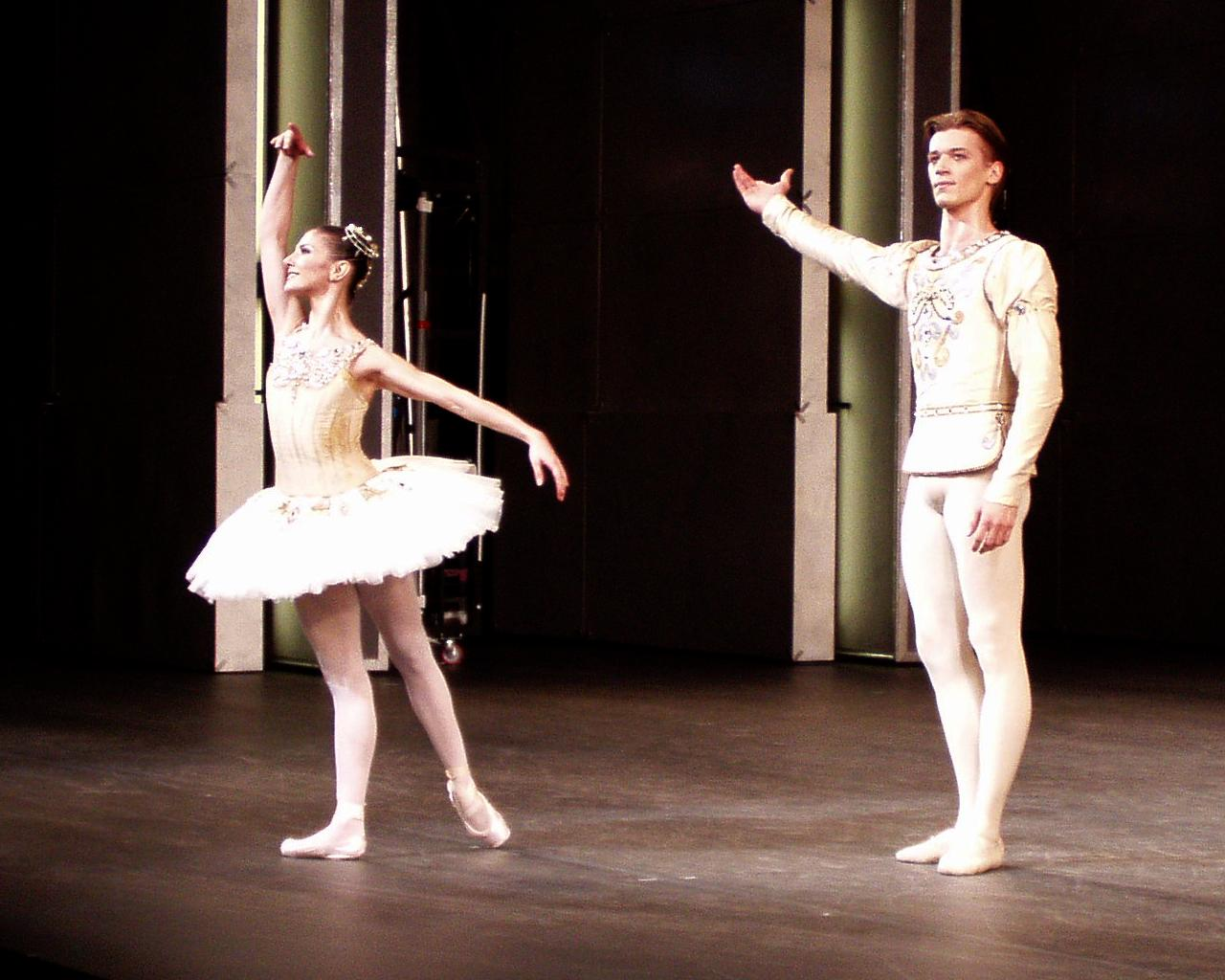
- Rupert Pennefather and Alina Cojocaru in the Diamonds suite from the opening night of George Balanchine's Jewels performed by the Royal Ballet, November 2007
- Born: 7 May 1981 (age 44); Maidenhead, England
- Occupation: Ballet dancer

Rupert Pennefather (born 7 May 1981) is a former principal dancer of the Royal Ballet Company. He joined the company in 1999 and was promoted to principal status alongside his pas-de-deux partner Lauren Cuthbertson in June 2008, following well-received performances in Romeo and Juliet at the Royal Opera House. He left the company in August 2015.

Pennefather has gained acclaim despite several setbacks, including failing the annual assessment at the company's White Lodge school at 12, and 'being asked to leave' The Arts Educational School, Tring Park at 15. Pennefather continued his training in his home town of Maidenhead under Julie Rose, a former Royal Ballet member, and his tenacity saw him accepted into the Royal Ballet Company in 1999. He sustained a tendon injury as a soloist in 2002, and was out of action for 18 months. Upon full recovery in 2004 he was selected for the principal role of Paris in Romeo and Juliet by prima ballerina Sylvie Guillem, and Aminta in Sylvia by director Dame Monica Mason, which 'proved to be his breakthrough'.

Pennefather's potential to enter the canon of great British ballet dancers alongside such greats as Anthony Dowell, David Wall and Jonathan Cope is closely coupled with the fact that his peer and pas-de-deux partner Lauren Cuthbertson is also British-born, bringing them progressively more attention as the next Anthony Dowell and Antionette Sibley in the British media. According to Jonathan Cope, "they are very much in sync with each other... I'm quite excited about it".
