= Tring =

Market town in Hertfordshire, England

Coordinates: 51.7962°N 0.6592°W

- Market town
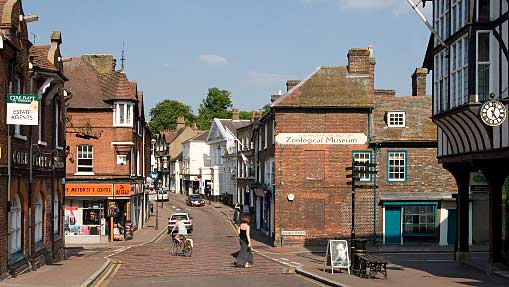
- Tring High Street

- Location within Hertfordshire
- Area: 36.21 km^{2} (13.98 sq mi)
- Population: 12,427
  - Density: 321.32/km^{2} (832.2/sq mi)
- OS grid reference: SP924117
- Civil parish: Tring
- District: Dacorum
- Shire county: Hertfordshire
- Region: East
- Country: England
- Sovereign state: United Kingdom
- Post town: TRING
- Postcode district: HP23
- Dialling code: 01442
- Police: Hertfordshire
- Fire: Hertfordshire
- Ambulance: East of England
- UK Parliament: Harpenden and Berkhamsted
- Website: www.tring.gov.uk

Tring /trɪŋ/ is a market town and civil parish in the Borough of Dacorum, in Hertfordshire, England. It is situated in a gap passing through the Chiltern Hills, classed as an Area of Outstanding Natural Beauty, 30 miles (50 km) from Central London. Tring is linked to London by the Roman road of Akeman Street, the modern A41 road, the Grand Union Canal and the West Coast Main Line to London Euston. Settlements in Tring date back to prehistoric times and it was mentioned in the Domesday Book; the town received its market charter in 1315. Tring is now largely a commuter town within the London commuter belt. As of 2021, Tring had a population of 12,427.

== Toponymy ==
The name Tring is believed to derive from the Old English Tredunga or Trehangr, 'Tre' meaning 'tree' and the suffix 'ing' implying 'a slope where trees grow'.

== History ==
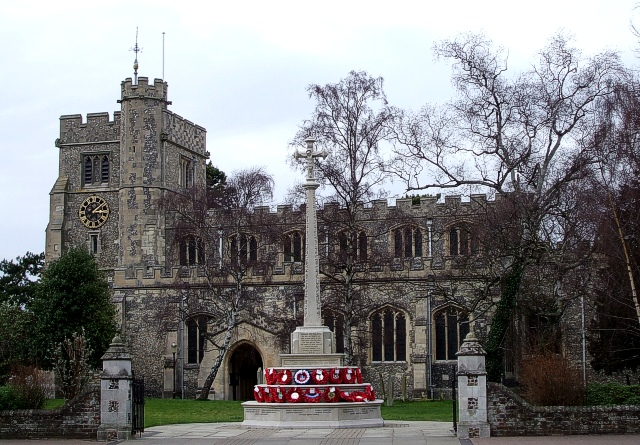
The Church of St Peter and St Paul, Tring, viewed from the Rose and Crown

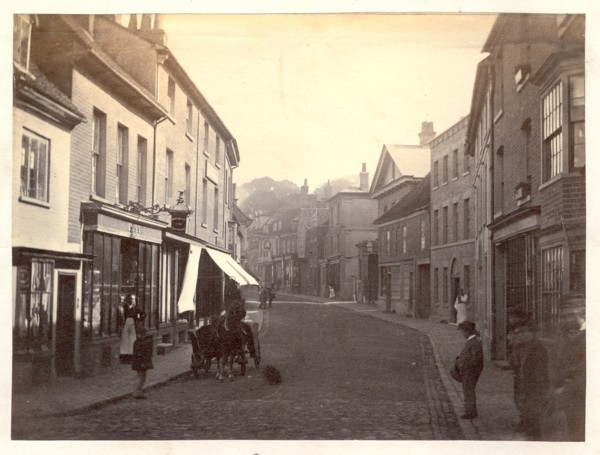
The High Street in the 19th century

There is evidence of prehistoric settlement with Iron Age barrows and defensive embankments adjacent to The Ridgeway, and also later Saxon burials. The town straddles the Roman road called Akeman Street, running through as the High Street. Tring was the dominant settlement in the area, being the primary settlement in the Hundred of Tring at the time of the Domesday Book (1086). Tring had a large population and paid a large amount of tax relative to most settlements listed in that survey. Landholdings included the manor of Treunga, assigned to Count Eustace II of Boulogne by William the Conqueror.

In 1315, the town was granted a market charter by Edward II. This charter gave Faversham Abbey the right to hold weekly markets on Tuesdays, and a ten-day fair starting on 29 June, the Feast of Saints Peter and Paul. It also prevented the creation of any rival markets within a day's travel of the town. The tower of the Church of St Peter and St Paul was built between 1360 and 1400.

Until 1440, there was a small village east of Tring called Pendley (or Penley, Pendele, or Pentlai). The landowner Sir Robert Whittingham received a grant of free warren from King Henry VI. He enclosed 200 acres (about 80 hectares) and tore down the buildings on the land, returning the estate to pasture, and built a manor house, Pendley Manor. This house was variously inhabited by the Verney, Anderson and Harcourt families until the mid-19th century.

Tring Park Mansion was designed by Sir Christopher Wren and was built in 1682 for the owner Henry Guy, Gentleman of the Privy Chamber to Charles II. John Washington, the son of the Reverend Lawrence Washington and Amphyllis Twigden, was born and brought up in Tring. In 1656 he left Tring to go on a trading voyage to Virginia, but after a shipwreck on the Potomac River he remained in Virginia, married and started a family which eventually included his great-grandson, George Washington, the first President of the United States. The town's prosperity was greatly improved at the start of the 19th century by the construction nearby of the Grand Junction Canal, and soon afterwards in 1835 the London and Birmingham Railway. Industries which benefited included flour milling, brewing, silk weaving, lace-making and straw plaiting.

In 1835, the medieval Pendley Manor was destroyed by fire. A local landowner, Joseph Grout Williams, commissioned a new manor house to be built in Jacobean Revival style and this building still stands today on Station Road.

In 1836, Thomas Butcher, a wholesale seed and corn merchant, and his son also called Thomas, established a private bank, Thomas Butcher & Son, in Tring High Street. The business was subsequently run by the next generation of the family, Frederick and George, and was also known locally as Tring Old Bank. By 1900 it had branches in Aylesbury, Chesham and Berkhamsted. From this time, it became the subject of successive bank consolidations, eventually becoming a branch of the National Westminster Bank, the last to be represented in the town.

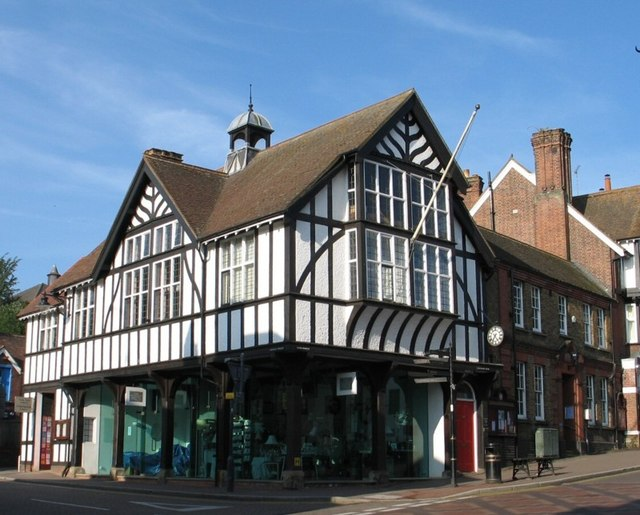
Tring Market House

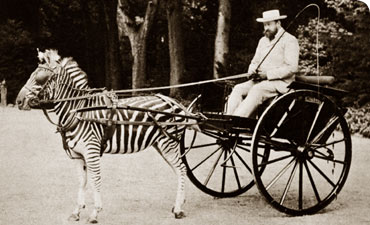
Walter Rothschild and his carriage drawn by zebras

In the late 19th century, the estate became the home of the Rothschild family, whose influence on the town was considerable. The site for Tring Market House was presented by to the town by Nathan Rothschild, 1st Baron Rothschild. His son, Walter Rothschild, 2nd Baron Rothschild, built a private zoological museum in Tring. This housed what may have been the world's largest collection of animal taxidermy at the time of its founding. It has been part of the Natural History Museum, London since 1937; in April 2007, the museum changed its name to the Natural History Museum at Tring, in order to make people more aware of the museum's link to London's Natural History Museum. In 1902, the 2nd Lord Rothschild also released the edible dormouse (Glis glis) into Tring Park; he used to ride around the town in a carriage drawn by zebras. In the town centre of Tring, there is a pavement maze in the shape of a zebra's head in order to remember the link that Tring has to the Rothschild family.

The former livestock market place is now the home of a weekly Friday market and a fortnightly Saturday farmers' market. Some of the former livestock pens have been retained. The old livestock market office is now the home of the Tring Local History Museum, which opened in September 2010.

== Governance ==
Tring is a part of the UK Parliament constituency of Harpenden and Berkhamsted. Victoria Collins has been the Member of Parliament (MP) since the July 2024 election.

Tring has three tiers of local government at parish (town), district and county level: Tring Town Council, Dacorum Borough Council and Hertfordshire County Council. Since the local elections on 2 May 2019, Tring Town Council comprises 11 Liberal Democrats and 1 Conservative.

=== Administrative history ===
Tring
- Local Government District (1859–1894); Urban District (1894–1974)
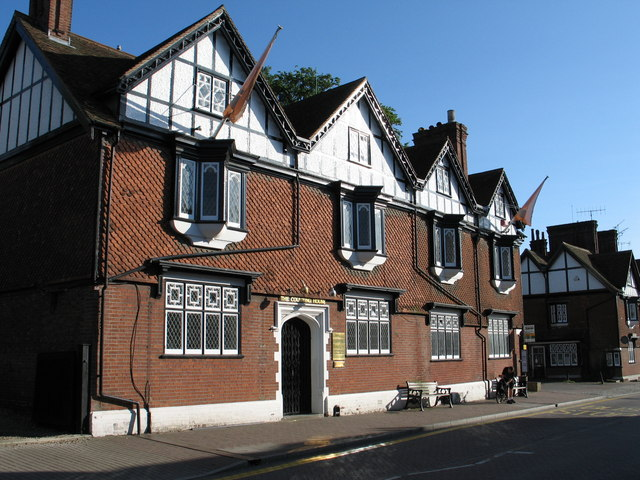
- Council offices 1952–1974: 9 High Street, Tring
- Population
  - 1891: 4,525
  - 1971: 8,815
- History
  - Created: 2 February 1859 (Local Government District); 31 December 1894 (Urban District)
  - Abolished: 31 March 1974
  - Succeeded by: Dacorum
  - HQ: Tring
- Contained within
  - County Council: Hertfordshire

The parish of Tring formerly included a large rural area, as well as the town itself, with Long Marston and Wilstone. The parish was administered by its vestry, in the same way as most small towns and rural areas. It was included in the Berkhamsted Poor Law Union from 1835.

The "Upper Hamlet" of the parish of Tring, covering the town, was made a local government district with effect from 2 February 1859, governed by a local board. Following the Public Health Act 1872, such local government districts were also called urban sanitary districts. Under the Local Government Act 1894, urban sanitary districts became urban districts on 31 December 1894. The 1894 Act also stipulated that a parish could not be partly in an urban district and partly outside it. The old parish of Tring was therefore split, with the part outside the urban district becoming a separate parish called Tring Rural with effect from its first parish meeting on 4 December 1894. The Tring Rural Parish, covering Long Marston, Wilstone and the surrounding areas, was included in the Berkhamsted Rural District.

Tring Urban District Council held its first meeting on 3 January 1895 at the Vestry Hall in Church Yard. The first chairman was Frederick Butcher, who had been the last chairman of the old local board. Tring Urban District Council continued to meet at the Vestry Hall until 1910, and had an office on Western Road. It then moved its meeting place to the Market House at 61 High Street, which had been built between 1898 and 1900. The council remained at Market House until 1952, when it moved to the former Tring Park estate office at 9 High Street, remaining there until the council's abolition.

Tring Urban District was abolished under the Local Government Act 1972, becoming part of the district of Dacorum on 1 April 1974. A successor parish was created for the former urban district, with its parish council taking the name Tring Town Council. The former urban district council's offices at 9 High Street became private offices, with the building being renamed the Counting House. Tring Town Council is based at the Market House at 61 High Street.

== Geography ==
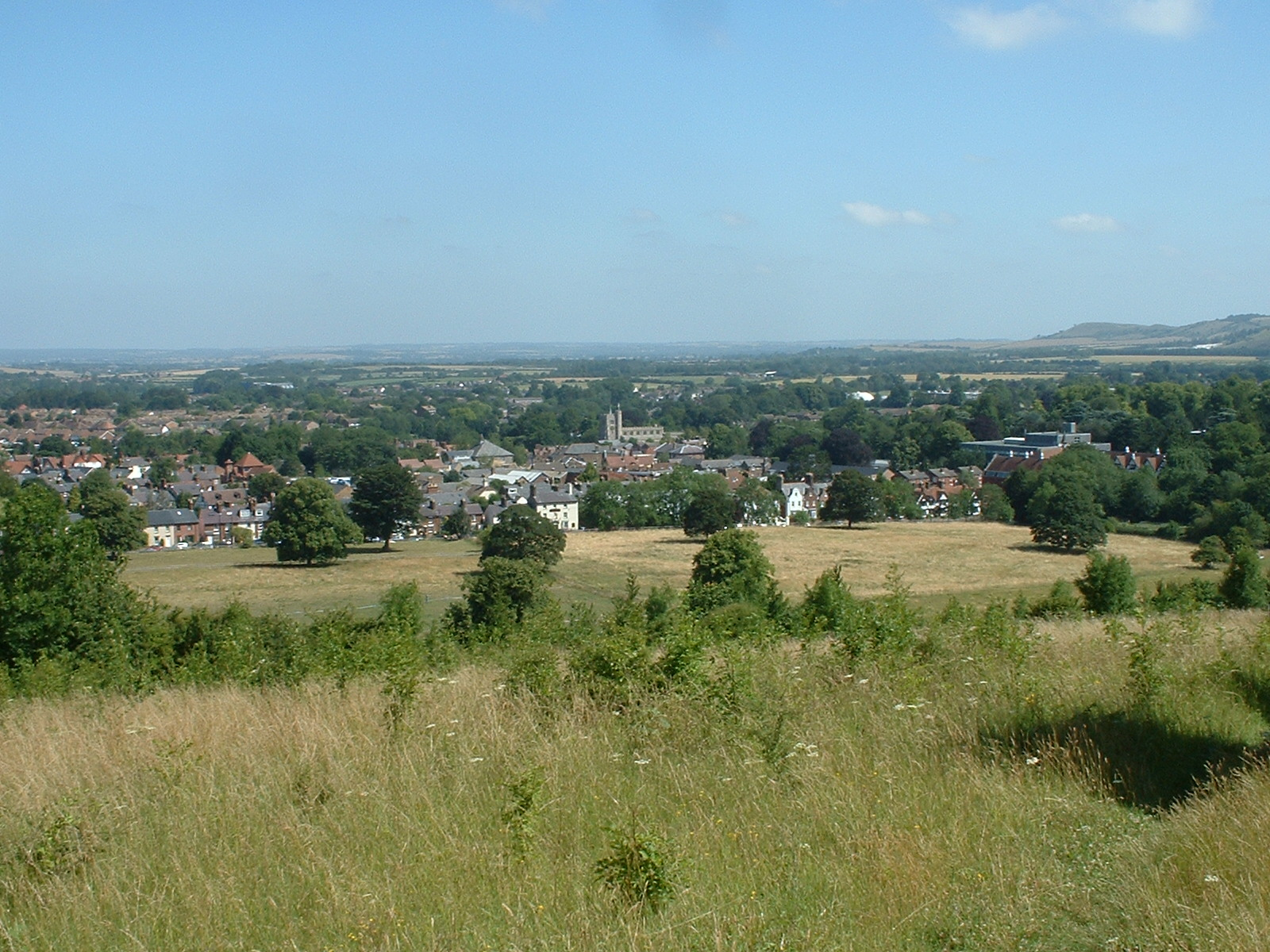
View over Tring, looking north

Tring is in west Hertfordshire, adjacent to the Buckinghamshire border, at a low point in the Chiltern Hills known as the 'Tring Gap'. This has been used as a crossing point since ancient times, being at the junction of the Icknield Way and under the Romans Akeman Street, the major Roman road linking London to Cirencester. It is transected east and west by the ancient earthwork called Grim's Dyke. It is located at the summit level of the Grand Union Canal and both the canal and railway pass through in deep cuttings. Tring railway cutting is 2.5 mi (4.0 km) long and an average of 39 ft (12 m) deep and is celebrated in a series of coloured lithographs by John Cooke Bourne showing its construction in the 1830s.

The four Tring Reservoirs – Wilstone, Tringford, Startops End and Marsworth – were built to supply water for the canal. These have been a national nature reserve since 1955, and identified as a Site of Special Scientific Interest since 1987. Nearby, within the Chilterns Area of Outstanding Natural Beauty that almost surrounds the town, is the Ashridge Estate, part of the National Trust and home to Ashridge Business School.

The civil parish includes the hamlets of Little Tring, New Mill and Bulbourne to the north of Tring and Hastoe to the south.

=== Climate ===
Climate data for Tring
| Month | Jan | Feb | Mar | Apr | May | Jun | Jul | Aug | Sep | Oct | Nov | Dec | Year |
|---|---|---|---|---|---|---|---|---|---|---|---|---|---|
| Mean daily maximum °C (°F) | 6 (43) | 7 (45) | 10 (50) | 12 (54) | 16 (61) | 19 (66) | 21 (70) | 22 (72) | 18 (64) | 14 (57) | 9 (48) | 6 (43) | 13 (55) |
| Mean daily minimum °C (°F) | 3 (37) | 3 (37) | 4 (39) | 5 (41) | 8 (46) | 10 (50) | 12 (54) | 13 (55) | 11 (52) | 8 (46) | 5 (41) | 3 (37) | 7 (45) |
| Average precipitation mm (inches) | 69.3 (2.73) | 59.4 (2.34) | 46.5 (1.83) | 70.1 (2.76) | 58.1 (2.29) | 58.9 (2.32) | 46.0 (1.81) | 68.9 (2.71) | 51.7 (2.04) | 84.3 (3.32) | 93.9 (3.70) | 80.9 (3.19) | 788.0 (31.02) |

== Flour mill ==
Heygates Mill is a flour mill; it was originally a windmill and the company was run by William Mead. It was demolished in 1910 to make way for a wheat storage silo. In those days, Mead lived on-site in a house next to the yard, and owned half the area taken by the mill of today. The remaining space was occupied by boat-builders, Bushell Brothers, who built narrowboats for the canal. The Heygate family took over Mead's business in 1945, and today mills 100,000 tons of wheat a year, resulting in 76,000 tons of flour. This is mainly bakers' flour, but there is also a commitment to wholemeal digestive for biscuits, bulk outlets and a large output of 1.5 kg bags from the pre-packed flour plant.

In the days of the Tring windmill, only two men operated the system, milling ten stone per hour. Now, computerised, more than twelve tons per hour are produced. Heygate's Tring mill has 80 employees and sixteen trucks delivering throughout the south of England.

== Economy ==
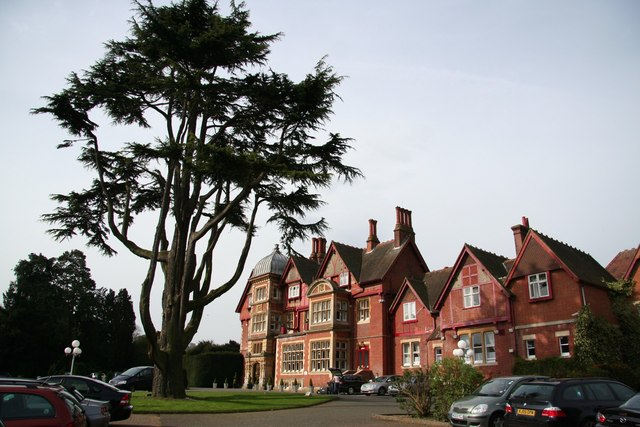
Pendley Manor

Pendley Manor, a hotel, conference and arts centre, is situated about 1 mile (1.6 km) east of the town, near the railway station. Tring Brewery has been operating in the town since 1992.

The UK headquarters of Huel Ltd is in Tring.

Tring is home to the Tring Book Festival; a two-week festival held in November. Tring is part of the Dacorum Local Food Initiative.

== Transport ==
=== Railway ===
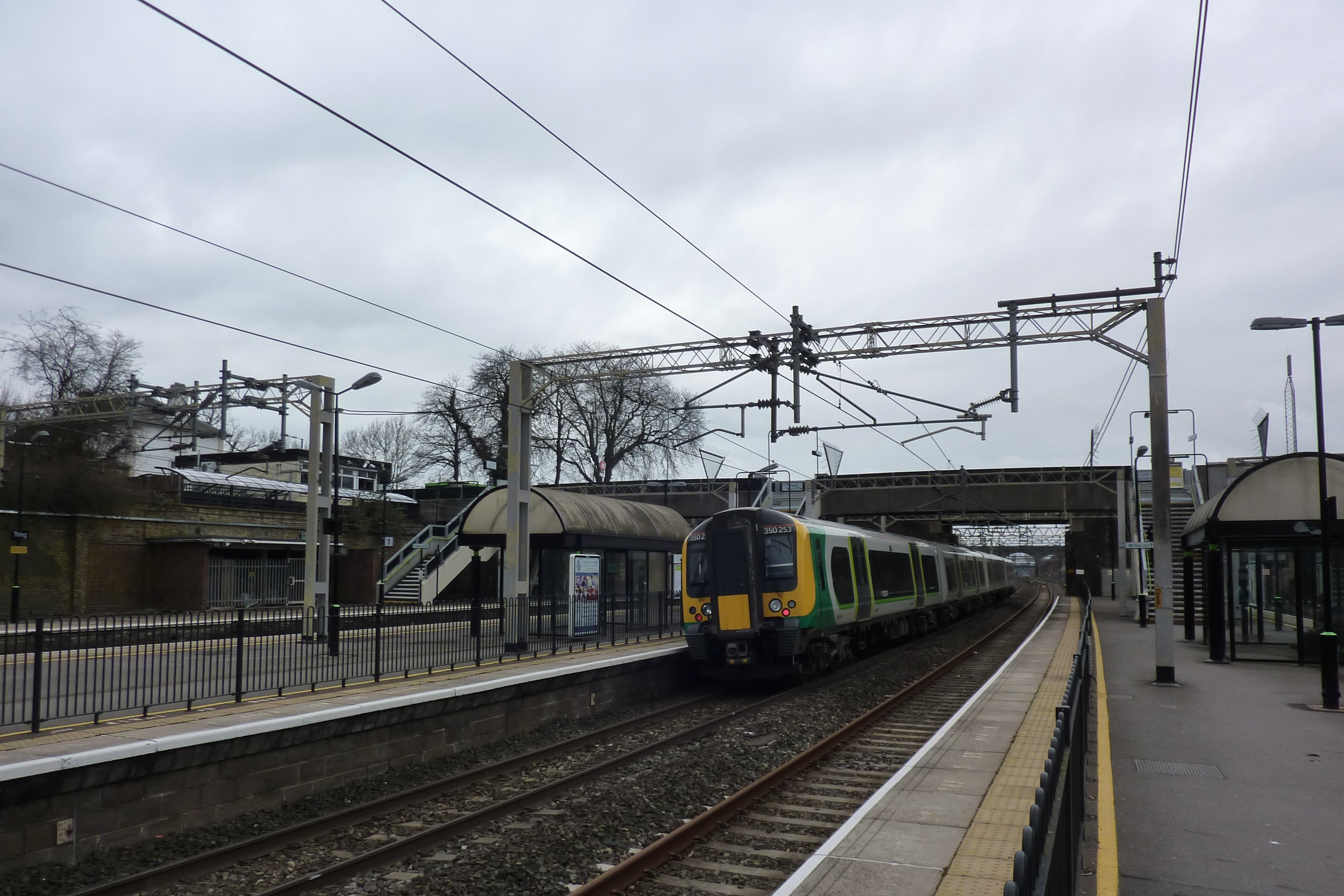
A London Midland train at Tring railway station

Tring railway station is located about 2 miles (3.2 km) east of the town and lies on the West Coast Main Line. London Northwestern Railway operates regular services between Milton Keynes Central and London Euston.

==== History ====
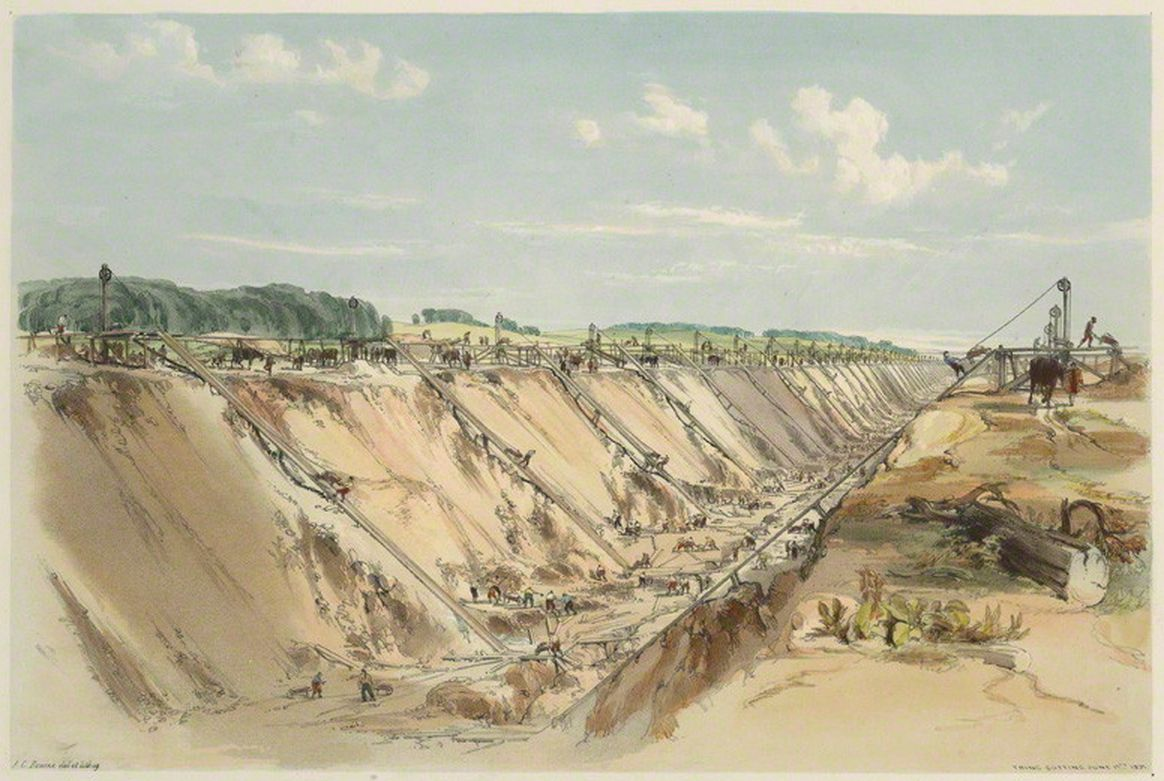
Lithograph entitled Tring Cutting by John C. Bourne (1839) illustrating the excavation near Tring for the London and Birmingham Railway

The station was originally opened in 1837 by the London & Birmingham Railway, under the direction of the railway engineer Robert Stephenson.

The remote location of Tring station was due to changes to the route of the railway imposed on Stephenson by local landowners such as Lord Brownlow, who wished to protect his Ashridge Estate. The location is sometimes wrongly attributed to objections, which were said to have been made by Lord Rothschild to protect his land in Tring; in fact, Lord Rothschild was not born until 1840, three years after the railway had opened, and the Tring lands were only acquired by his father Lionel in 1872. He did, however, object to a much later plan to build a steam tramway between Tring station and Aylesbury.

An extension of the Metropolitan Railway was once considered from Chesham, making Tring station the terminus, with connections to the main line companies serving the north; this project was not realised.

=== Buses ===
Bus services in Tring are operated by Arriva, Red Rose Travel and Red Eagle. Direct destinations include Aylesbury, Dunstable, Hemel Hempstead, Luton and Watford.

=== Roads ===
In 1973, the A41 Tring bypass was opened. It runs through Tring Park and was originally conceived as the first stretch of a new motorway, the A41(M), which was planned to run from the M25 at Hunton Bridge to Aylesbury; the project was not realised and the bypass was downgraded to trunk road status. In 1993, the A41 bypass was extended with 12 miles (19 km) of grade-separated dual carriageway that links the Tring bypass to the M25.

== Education ==
Tring School is a state secondary school and sixth form with approximately 1,500 pupils (ages 11–18). It is located on Mortimer Hill on the east side of the town. It is now designated a Specialist Humanities College, with History, Geography and English as its lead subjects. It has had Academy status since September 2012.

Tring Park School for the Performing Arts (formerly known as the Arts Educational School, Tring Park) is an independent specialist performing arts and academic school. It is located in Tring Mansion and has 300 pupils.

Tring has four state junior schools: Bishop Wood CE Junior School, Dundale Primary and Nursery School, Goldfield Infants and Nursery School, and Grove Road Primary School.

Tring has a youth club – The Tring Youth Project – for those between 11 and 18 at the Temperance Hall in Christchurch Road.

Tring also has a theatre youth group, Court Youth Theatre, which is connected to the Court Theatre, Pendley Manor. This has three sections to it: juniors, intermediates and seniors.

There is also an Air Training Corps squadron in Tring (2457 Squadron) on New Road.

== Media ==
Local news and television programmes are provided by BBC East and ITV Anglia. Television signals are received from the Sandy Heath TV transmitter, BBC South and ITV Meridian can also be received from the Oxford transmitting station.

Tring's local radio stations are BBC Three Counties Radio, Heart Hertfordshire, Greatest Hits Radio Bucks, Beds and Herts (formerly Mix 96) and Tring Radio, a community based radio station that broadcast from the town.

The town is served by the local newspaper, Hemel Hempstead Gazette & Express.

== Sport ==
The town is home to the following:

- Three football clubs: Tring Athletic, Tring Town and Tring Corinthians; all of which play in the Spartan South Midlands Football League. Tring Tornadoes is a youth football club, which field sides for boys and girls up to 16
- Tring R.U.F.C., a rugby union team that won promotion to London Division One in 2008
- Tring Hockey Club has three men's and two ladies' sides
- Tring Park Cricket Club, in the Home Counties Premier Cricket League
- There is also a squash club.

Tring Sports Centre is in the grounds of Tring School.

== In popular culture ==
Edward Lear makes reference to Tring in his work, The Book of Nonsense:

There was an Old Person of Tring,
Who embellished his nose with a ring;
He gazed at the moon,
Every evening in June,
That ecstatic Old Person of Tring.

== Notable people ==
- Sir Francis Verney (1584–1615), English adventurer and pirate.
- John Washington (1631–1677) great-grandfather of George Washington, the first President of the United States.
- Sir William Gore (1643–1707), merchant and Lord Mayor of London. Subject of an impressive monument in the parish church.
- John Brown (1795–1890), brewer in Tring; he built and owned several public houses in the area.
- Gerald Massey (1828–1907) poet, literary critic, Egyptologist and Spiritualist; born nearby at Gamnel Wharf, New Mill, on the Wendover branch of the Grand Union Canal.
- Gilbert Lacy (1834–1878), cricketer
- Arthur Butcher (1863–1955), cricketer
- Walter Rothschild, 2nd Baron Rothschild (1868–1937), banker, politician and zoologist.
- Edward Barber (10 June 1893 – 12 March 1915) born and lived in Tring, was posthumously awarded the Victoria Cross for bravery during the Battle of Neuve Chapelle in the First World War.
- Robert Holmes (scriptwriter) (1926–1986), television writer, notable for writing several episodes of Doctor Who, was born in Tring.
- Roger Moorhouse, a British historian and author
- Lawrence Ward, former Serjeant at Arms of the British House of Commons lived at Kingsley Walk, Tring between 1977 and 1999, attending Dundale Junior and Tring Secondary Schools.
- Julian James, a former professional footballer.
- Graham Poll, an English former football referee for the Premier League and World Cup
- Graham Barber, former Premiership referee and 2003 FA Cup Final referee, used to live in Tring.
- Zoe Harrison, rugby union player for Saracens and England.

== Gallery ==
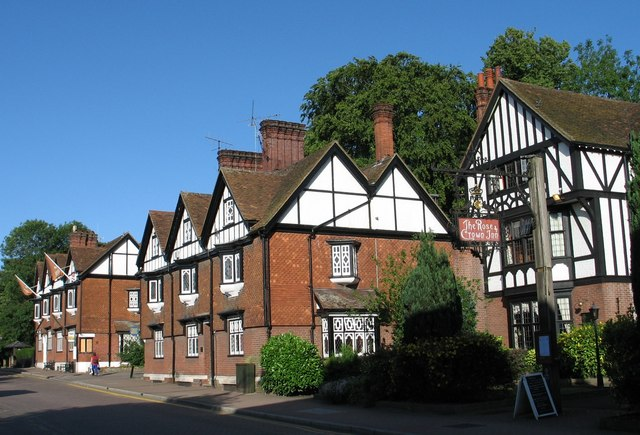
High Street, Tring, Hertfordshire Architecture by William Huckvale (1848–1936).

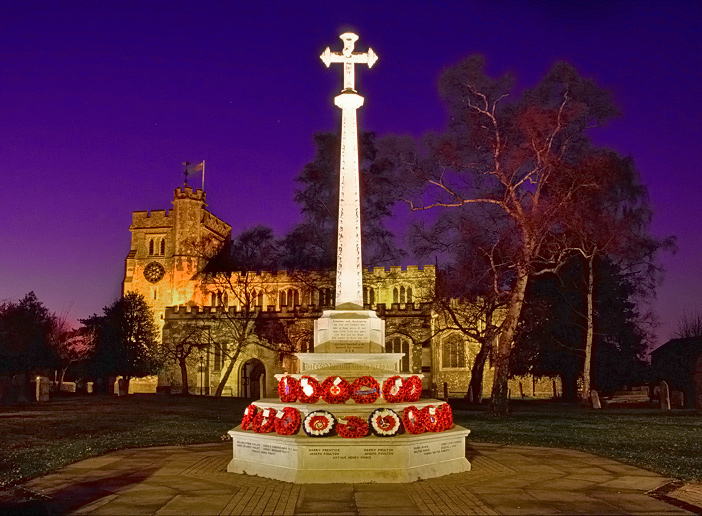
Church of St Peter and St Paul

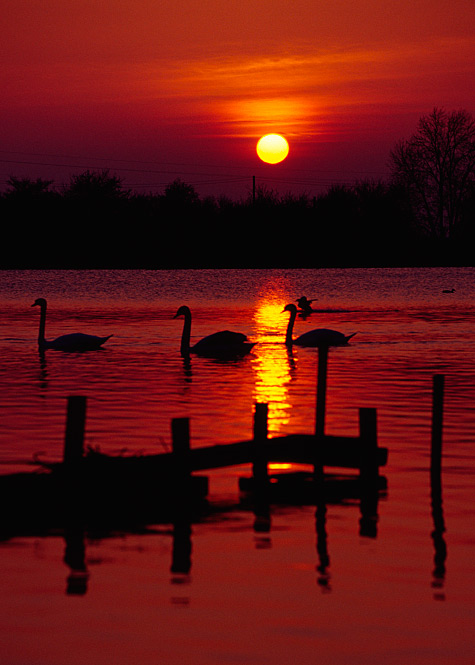
Tring Reservoirs at sunset

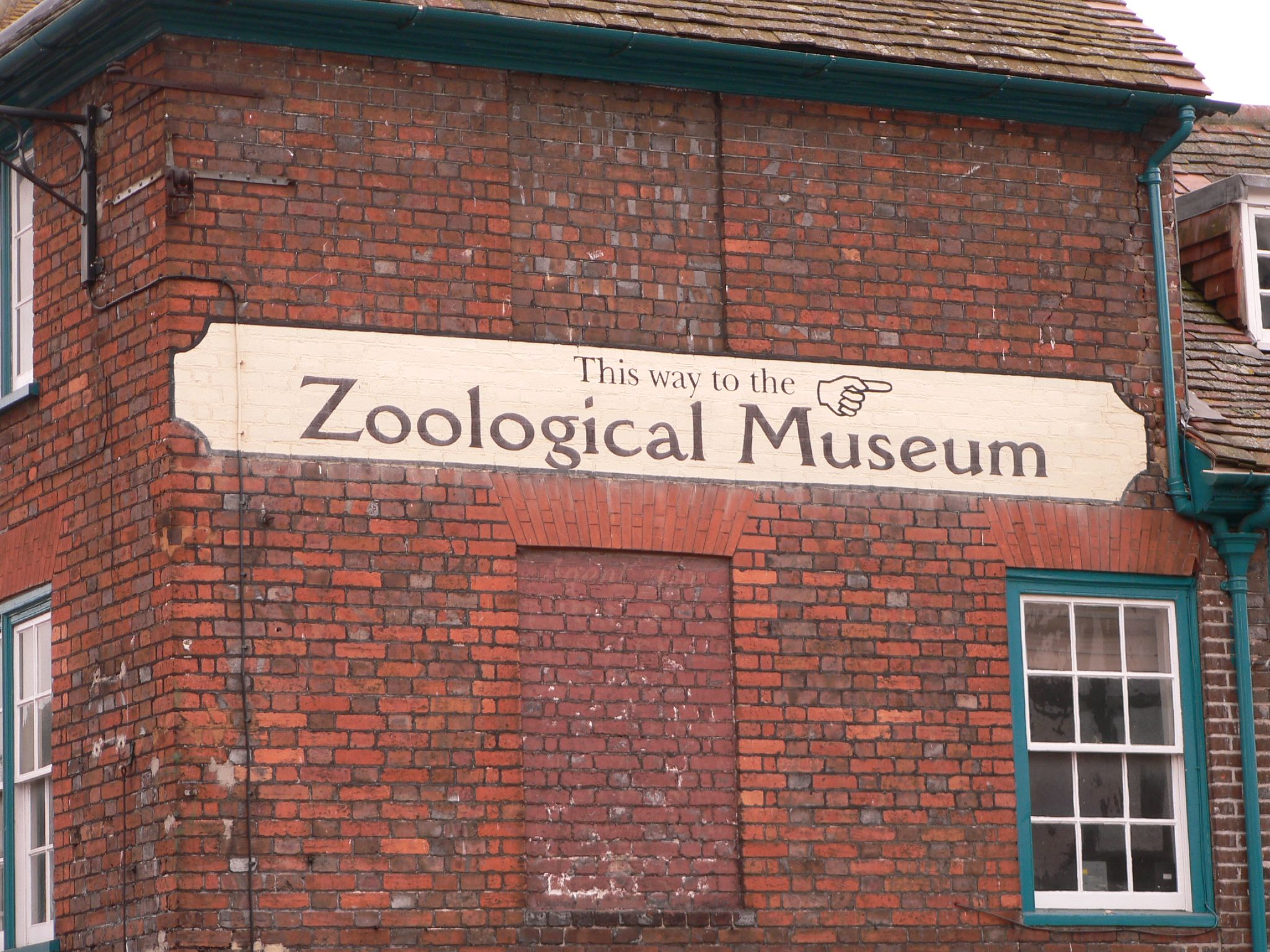
Sign to the Zoological Museum

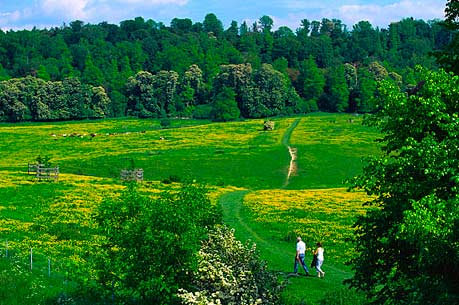
Tring Park
