= Gilbert Lacy =

English cricketer (1834–1878)

Personal information
- Full name: Gilbert de Lacy Lacy
- Born: 26 February 1834; Tring, Hertfordshire, England
- Died: 7 June 1878 (aged 44); Mount Frere, Cape Colony
- Batting: Unknown

Domestic team information
- Years: Team
- 1854: Marylebone Cricket Club

Career statistics
Competition	First-class
Matches	2
Runs scored	12
Batting average	12.00
100s/50s	–/–
Top score	4*
Catches/stumpings	1/–
- Source: Cricinfo, 23 June 2019

Gilbert de Lacy Lacy (26 February 1834 – 7 June 1878) was an English first-class cricketer.

A member of the de Lacy family, Lacy was born to Charles de Lacy Lacy at Tring in February 1826. He was educated at Westminster School, before going up to Magdalen College, Oxford. He made his debut in first-class cricket for the Marylebone Cricket Club against Oxford University at Oxford in 1854, following this up with a second first-class appearance for the Gentlemen of England against the Gentlemen of Kent in the same year at Canterbury. At some point after this he left England for Cape Colony, where he died at Mount Frere in June 1878.
