= Arthur Butcher =

English cricketer

Personal information
- Full name: Arthur Butcher
- Born: 8 November 1863; Tring, Hertfordshire, England
- Died: 17 September 1955 (aged 91); Kensington, London, England
- Batting: Right-handed
- Bowling: Right-arm slow

Domestic team information
- Years: Team
- 1895–1909: Hertfordshire
- 1902–1905: Marylebone Cricket Club

Career statistics
Competition	First-class
Matches	2
Runs scored	35
Batting average	11.66
100s/50s	0/0
Top score	24*
Catches/stumpings	0/–
- Source: Cricinfo, 1 July 2019

Arthur Butcher (8 November 1863 – 17 September 1955) was an English first-class cricketer.

Born at Tring in November 1863, Butcher made his debut in minor counties cricket for Hertfordshire against Norfolk in the 1895 Minor Counties Championship. Butcher played minor counties cricket for Hertfordshire until 1909, making 111 appearances in the Minor Counties Championship. He also made two appearances in first-class cricket for the Marylebone Cricket Club at Lord's, playing against London County in 1902, and Leicestershire in 1905. He score 35 runs in his two first-class matches, with a high score of 24 not out. He died at Kensington in September 1955.
