= Tring railway station =

Railway station in Hertfordshire, England

Tring
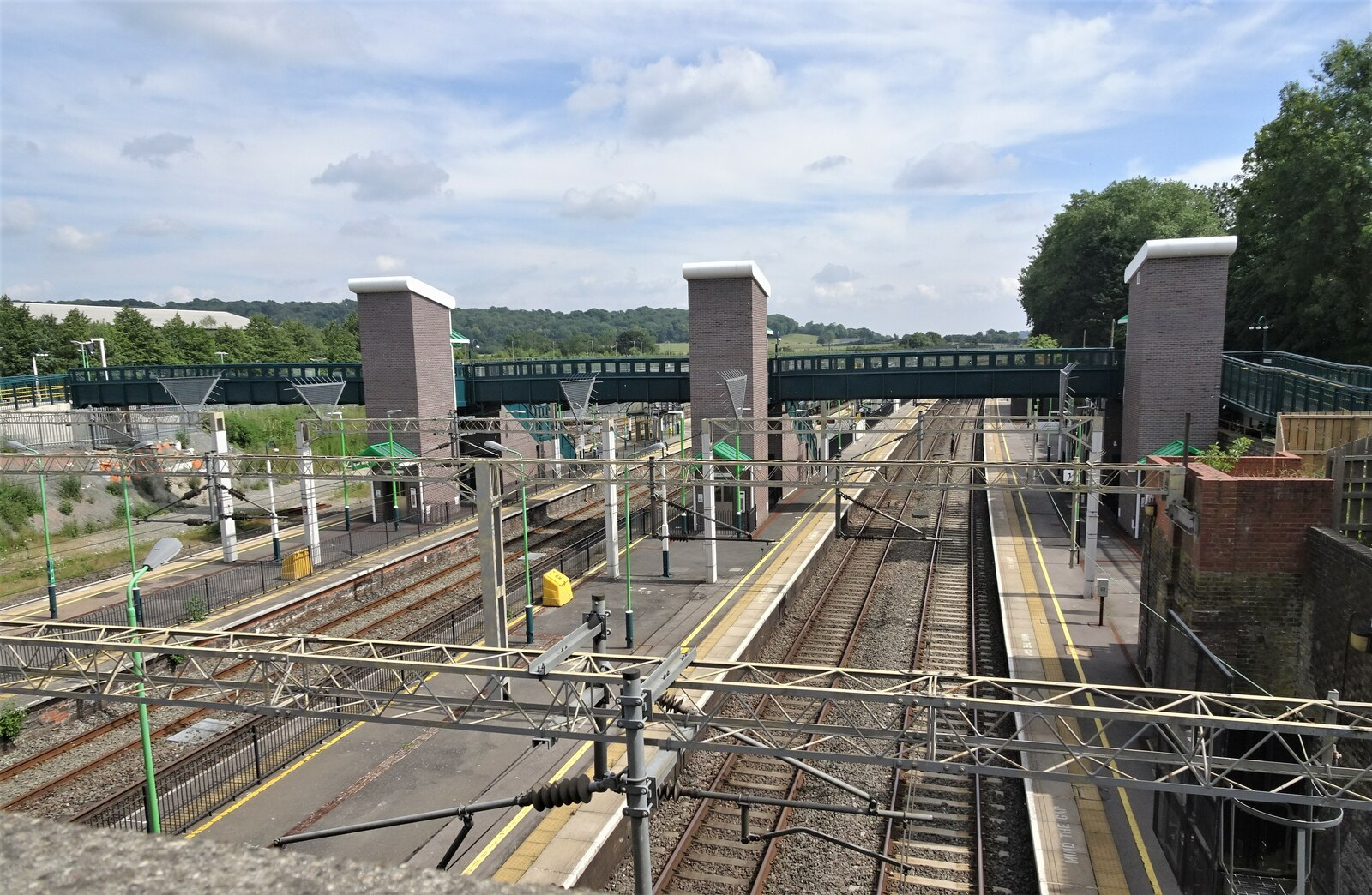

General information
- Location: Tring, Dacorum; England
- Coordinates: 51.8004°N 0.6225°W
- Grid reference: SP951122
- Owner: Network Rail
- Manager: London Northwestern Railway
- Platforms: 5

Other information
- Station code: TRI
- Classification: DfT category C2

History
- Opened: 16 October 1837
- Original company: London and Birmingham Railway
- Pre-grouping: London and North Western Railway
- Post-grouping: London Midland and Scottish Railway

Passengers
- 2021/22: ▲0.425 million
- 2022/23: ▲0.553 million
- 2023/24: ▲0.673 million
- 2024/25: ▲0.788 million
- 2025/26: ▲0.899 million
Location
Notes
- Passenger statistics from the Office of Rail and Road

Tring railway station is 1.5 miles (2.4 km) outside the market town of Tring, close to the Grand Union Canal but actually nearer to the village of Aldbury in Hertfordshire, England. Situated on the West Coast Main Line, the station is now an important marshalling point for commuter trains from here for most stations to London Euston.

There are five full length (12-car) platforms, with one side platform and two islands. To the east of the station are some south facing sidings connecting to the slow lines. Platforms 1 & 2 are the fast-line platforms, platforms 3 & 5 are the slow-line platforms and platform 4 is used by starting and terminating services to/from Euston and additional through trains southbound.

== History ==
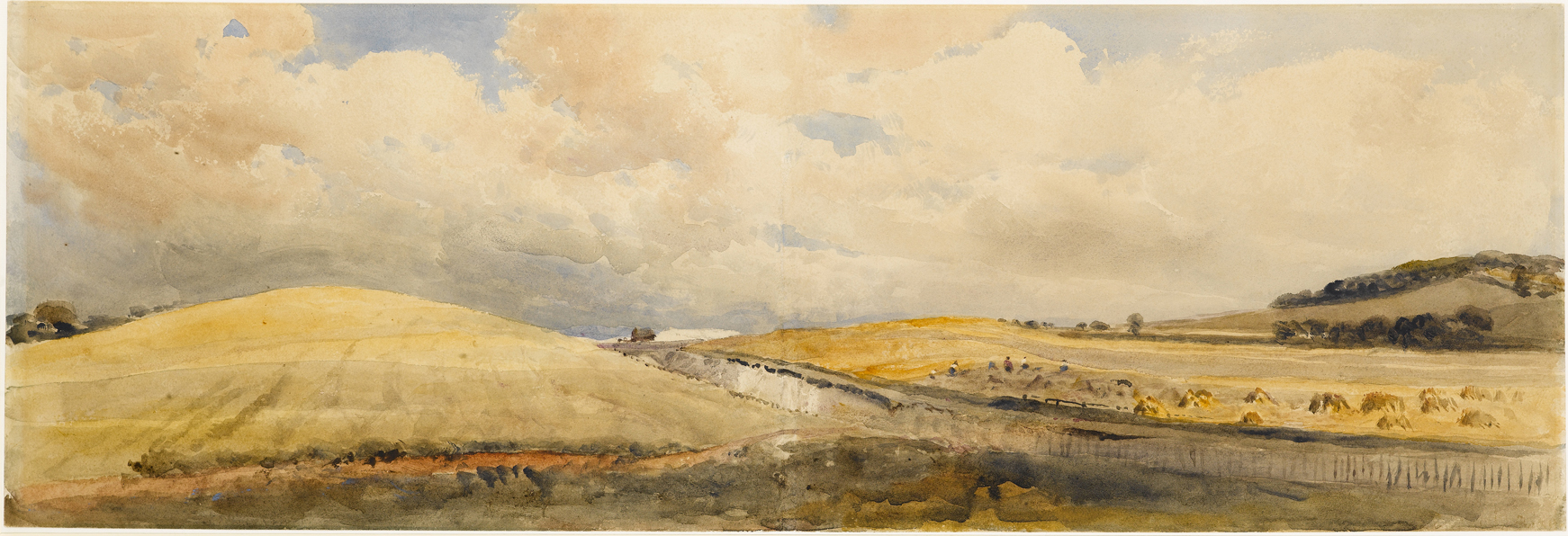
Peter de Wint, Cornfields near Tring Station, Hertfordshire, 1847, Princeton University Art Museum

Tring station was opened by the London and Birmingham Railway (L&BR) on 16 October 1837 when the L&BR extended its line out of London beyond Boxmoor to Tring. The first train to Tring ran from Primrose Hill at 9:00 am on 16 October 1837, reaching Tring at 10:10 am. On 15 November 1844, Queen Victoria and Prince Albert made their first train journey north from Euston, reaching Tring in 52 minutes where the train stopped to take on water. Despite rain, the appearance of the royal train attracted crowds of farm labourers and local children, to the Queen's delight. It is reported that after this stop, Victoria asked that the speed of her train be reduced.

The L&BR was constructed by the railway engineer Robert Stephenson. He originally planned a route which would have taken the new railway to the east of Tring, but vociferous opposition from influential local landowners such as the Earl of Essex, Earl of Clarendon, Lord Brownlow and Sir Astley Cooper delayed the project and forced the route to be changed before parliamentary approval could be obtained, with the result that Tring railway station had to be sited some distance from the town. The remote location of Tring station is sometimes wrongly attributed to objections which were said to have been made by Lord Rothschild to protect his land in Tring; in fact, Lord Rothschild was not born until 1840, three years after the railway had opened and the Tring lands were only acquired by his father Lionel in 1872. He did, however, object to a much later plan to build a steam tramway between Tring Station and Aylesbury. Tring station's distance from the town would have been greater had the L&BR placed the station at Pitstone Green, some three miles further north, as it originally planned to do. The preferred location at Pendley required purchasing land from the Comte d'Harcourt, another landowner reluctant to admit the railways to his estate, and he demanded such an exorbitant price that the L&BR selected a cheaper but less convenient plot of land. The townspeople of Tring were so enthusiastic for a railway that in 1837 they raised funds to bridge the difference in price between what the Company was prepared to pay and the price demanded by the Harcourt estate. They also supported the construction of a new road to the station and according to the 1839 issue of the Railway Times, "As soon as the Company had determined upon making it a first class station (where every train stops), the inhabitants came forward in a very spirited manner, and at their own expense formed a new road direct to the town".

Tring station was originally intended as a destination of a branch of the Metropolitan Railway (MR). A short section of the branch from Chalfont and Latimer to Chesham was built in 1887–89 before the MR chose to construct an alternative route across the Chilterns via Aylesbury instead. Although the MR continued to buy land between Chesham and Tring for some years after Chesham station opened, the route was never extended further and today Chesham remains as a branch line terminus of Transport for London's Metropolitan line.

Immediately north of the station, the line enters Tring Cutting, which allows it to cross the Chiltern Hills.

== Services ==
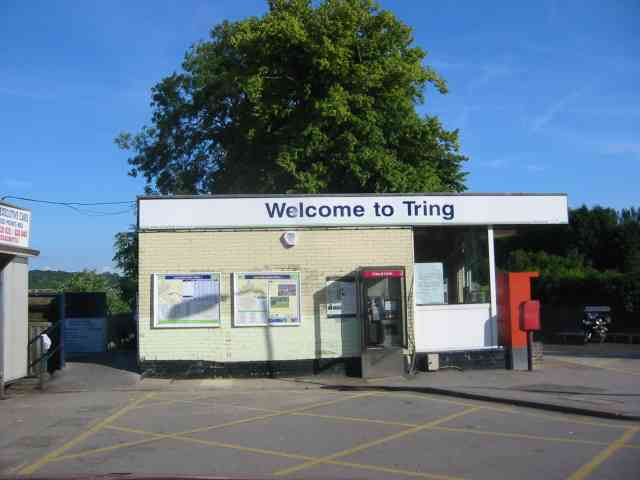
Station entrance

=== Current services ===
Tring lies on a major commuter route into central London and most West Coast Main Line train services run directly into London Euston. It is the terminus of many slower trains out of Euston and platform 4 provides a turnaround for these trains.

All services at Tring are operated by London Northwestern Railway.

The typical off-peak service in trains per hour is:

- 4 tph to London Euston (2 semi-fast, 2 stopping)
- 2 tph to Milton Keynes Central

During the peak hours, a number of additional services between Bletchley and London Euston call at the station.

A number of early morning and late evening services are extended beyond Milton Keynes Central to and from Northampton and Birmingham New Street.

On Sundays, the station is served by a half-hourly service between London Euston and Milton Keynes Central.

=== Former services ===
==== Connex South Central ====
In June 1997, Connex South Central began operating services between Gatwick Airport and Rugby via the Brighton and West London Lines that called at Tring with Class 319s. It was cut back to terminate at Milton Keynes in December 2000 before being withdrawn in May 2002 due to capacity constraints on the West Coast Main Line while it was upgraded.

==== Southern ====
Southern reintroduced the service in February 2009 with Class 377s operating initially operating from Brighton to Milton Keynes before being curtailed at its southern end at South Croydon and later Clapham Junction. In May 2022, Southern cut the service back to terminate at Watford Junction, thus ceasing to serve Tring.

Preceding station	National Rail	Following station
Cheddington towards Milton Keynes Central	London Northwestern Railway London–Milton Keynes	Berkhamsted towards London Euston
Terminus	London Northwestern Railway London–Milton Keynes	Berkhamsted towards London Euston
Former services
Leighton Buzzard	Southern West London Line	Berkhamsted

== Formerly proposed services ==
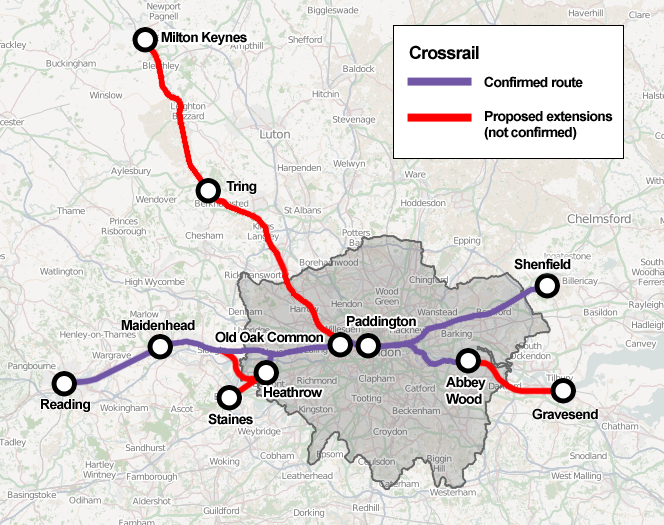
Outline map of the former future Crossrail extensions as recommended in the 2011 RUS

In the London & South East Rail Utilisation Strategy document published by Network Rail in 2011, Tring was identified as a terminus of a possible northern extension of the Crossrail lines, now known as the Elizabeth Line. The report recommended the addition of a tunnel in the vicinity of the proposed station at Old Oak Common connecting the Crossrail route to the West Coast Mainline. The diversion of rail services through central London would have enabled a direct link from stations such as Tring to West End stations such as Tottenham Court Road and would have alleviated congestion at Euston station; the Elizabeth Line now only runs to Heathrow and Reading. An announcement made in August 2014 by the transport secretary Patrick McLoughlin indicated that the government was actively evaluating the possibility of extending Crossrail as far as Tring and Milton Keynes Central. However, this plan was cancelled in 2016.
