= Carly Paoli =

British classically trained singer (born 1989)

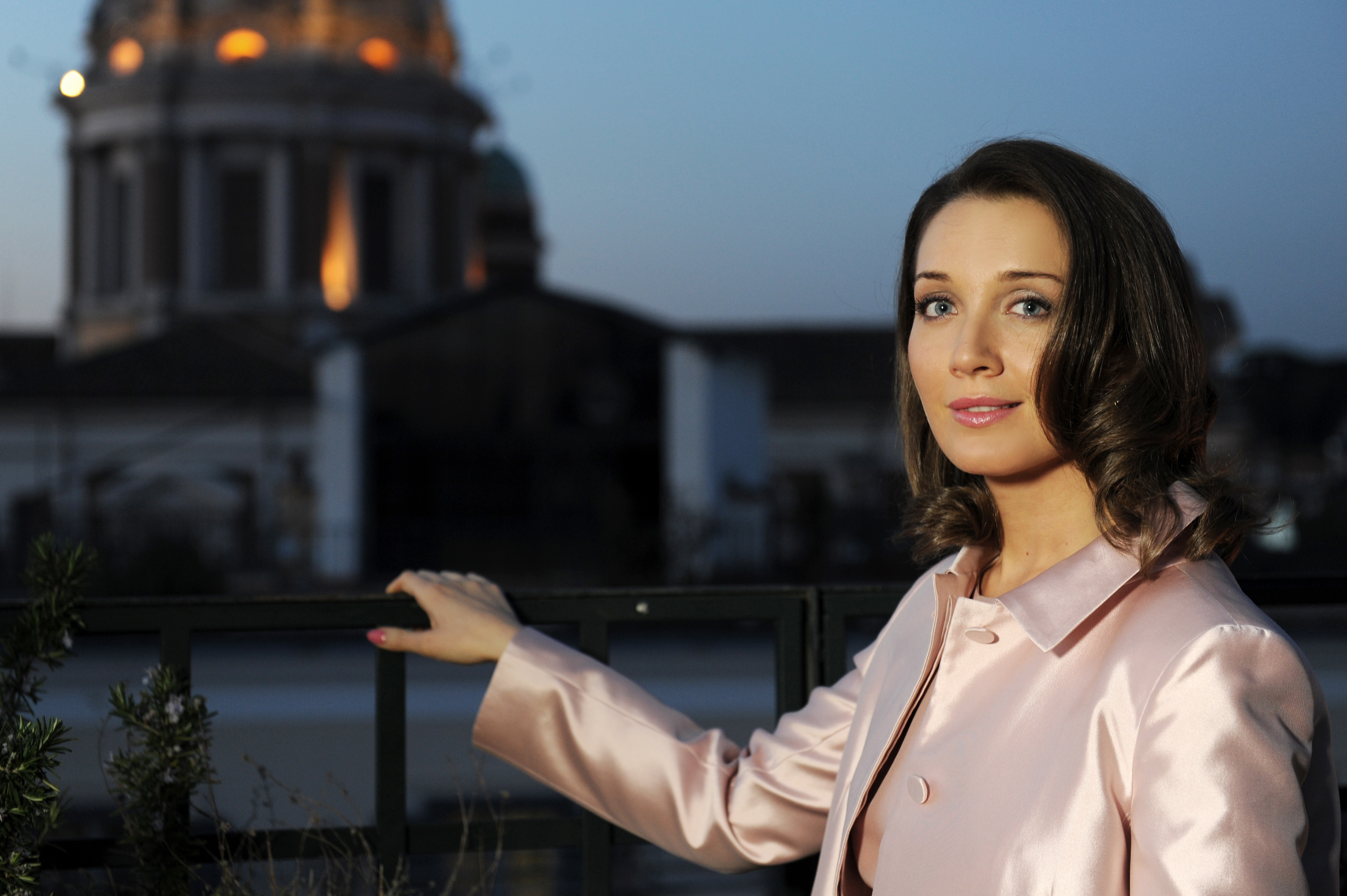

Background information
- Born: Carly Alison Hopkinson; 28 January 1989 (age 37); Mansfield, Nottinghamshire, England
- Genres: Opera, classical
- Occupation: Singer
- Instrument: Vocals
- Years active: 2014–present
- Website: https://carlypaoli.com/

Carly Alison Hopkinson (born 28 January 1989), known professionally as Carly Paoli, is a British classically trained singer, born in Mansfield, Nottinghamshire, England.

== Early life and education ==
Born in 1989, she was brought up in Mansfield, Nottinghamshire. Her father is English, but her mother is Anglo-Italian. Her maternal family are from, and still live near Spongano, Apulia and Paoli spent many of her summers staying with relations and singing in the local piazzas.

She started singing when she attended her local branch of Stagecoach Theatre Arts in Southwell. The vocal coach noticed Paoli's talent and told her mother that she should have private singing lessons. Along with these lessons, Paoli also attended a theatre school in Chesterfield called Directions Theatre Arts, and performed in many of their productions.

Paoli was offered a scholarship to attend Tring Park and was initially on the Musical Theatre course, subsequently transferring to the Drama Course. She was then offered a scholarship to study at the Royal Northern College of Music where she gained a BMus qualification.

== Career ==
After leaving college, she performed in concerts and for corporate events. In November 2014, Paoli made history as the first artist to perform at the International Women's Media Foundation (IWMF) Awards in Los Angeles, hosted by Hollywood actresses Olivia Wilde and Kate Hudson.

In June 2015, Paoli sang a duet with José Carreras in a performance at Windsor Castle, for the Prince of Wales.

Paoli's recording, "Ave Maria", composed by Romano Musumarra with lyrics by Grant Black, was played on Vatican radio as the theme for Pope Francis' Jubilee Year of Mercy in 2016.

In July 2016, Paoli was the headline singer in Music for Mercy, a concert staged in the historic Roman Forum.

In June 2017, Paoli released her debut album, Singing My Dreams.

In September 2023, Paoli sang the Italian national anthem as part of the 2023 Ryder Cup opening ceremony.

She is a member of the Salvation Army.

After her training, Paoli performed in a series of concerts. At one of these events, she was approached to perform in Malaysia and following her success was appointed as a brand ambassador for Bedat & Co, a watch company. She appeared at the David Foster Miracle Gala, the International Women's Media Foundation Awards in Los Angeles and was then asked to perform by HRH The Prince of Wales at Windsor Castle and later at St James' Palace.

In 2016 her rendition of Ave Maria was chosen to be the official song for the Jubilee Year of Pope Francis. She performed in two spectacular concerts in Rome – the first at Caracalla with special guest Spanish tenor Jose Carreras – and the second at The Roman Forum called 'Music for Mercy' special guests Andrea Bocelli, David Foster, Elaine Paige and The Tenors. The latter concert was shown live on RAI Uno and subsequently on Sky Arts.

She has performed on several occasions with Andrea Bocelli, most notably in Palazzo Vecchio, Florence, where their performance of "Time to Say Goodbye" was shown on PBS television. She has also sung for HRH The Prince of Wales at Windsor Castle and St James' Palace. Other concert venues include Carnegie Hall, Jordan Hall in Boston, the London Palladium and the O2 Arena. In 2018 she hosted her own concert at Cadogan Hall with guest Andrea Griminelli with a symphony orchestra conducted by Steven Mercurio. This concert formed the basis for her second album 'Live at Cadogan Hall'.

Her Italian heritage means that she is much in demand in Italy both on television and the concert platform. Apart from the broadcast of her concert from the Roman Forum on Rai 1, she has also appeared twice on the telethon, 'Con il Cuore di Francesco' from Assisi and 'Zecchino D’Oro' as well as other programmes.

In 2019, she became a Classical Brit nominee, and a BBC Music Ambassador in connection with BBC Music Day. As part of the Friday Night Is Music Night strand, she appeared at Lichfield Cathedral and was Michael Bolton's special guest on his show at the London Palladium.

Later that year she live-streamed a concert from the Bombed out Church in Liverpool, commemorating D-Day on her YouTube channel and another from her home in Apulia called Una serata in Salento.

Paoli and Calleja were reunited in the programme Christmas at the Castle which was shown on Sky Arts and also on TV2000.

In December 2021, Paoli sang at the Royal Variety Performance accompanying Jane McDonald in a rendition of Over the Rainbow.

== Recordings ==
=== Albums ===
Singing My Dreams - Debut album released on 30 June 2017 on the Abiah label. 14 songs, including, "Se, tu fossi" from Cinema Paradiso, the theme from Legends of the Fall by James Horner with lyrics by Paoli, "Ave Maria", "A Time for Mercy", and two duets "En Aranjuez con tu Amor" with José Carreras and "Il mio miracolo" with Alessandro Safina.

Live at Cadogan Hall - Live album released in 2018 on the Abiah label. Live recordings from the concert at Cadogan Hall in February 2018, including "I' te vurria vasà", "True Love's Kiss", a medley of Disney songs, "La ville de l'amour", a medley of songs dedicated to Paris and "Over the Rainbow". Also included, "Liberty" by Walter Afansieff with the Invictus Choir.

Due Anime - Second studio album released on 25 October 2019. English title Two Souls and reflected the dual Anglo-Italian heritage of Paoli. New versions of "Your Love" by Ennio Morricone and "Mi mancherai" by Luis Bacalav. Also "Canzone di mia nonna" medley of Italian classics and other songs about Italy. Also, a duet with Mario Lanza "The Loveliest Night of the Year".

Carly Paoli & Friends - Fourth album released on 24 September 2021 on the Absolute label. A collaborative album which features Paoli and some of the biggest names from across the music world.

The Movie Collection - Fifth album released on 22 September 2023 on the Absolute label. A contemporary collection of thirteen songs from some of Paoli's favorite movies. "Evermore Without You" from the musical The Woman in White is a bonus track on the album.

=== Singles ===
- Ave Maria Musumarra/Black issued on the Abiah label
- A Time for Mercy Musumarra/Black issued on the Abiah label
- My Christmas Dream Is You Musumarra/Béraud issued on the Abiah label
- Memory of You Horner/Paoli issued on the Abiah label
- I' te vurria vasà Neapolitan song by Eduardo di Capua Vincenzo Russo Issued on the Abiah label
- The Mystery of Your Gift Groban & Byrne Issued on the Abiah label
- Liberty Afanasieff/Gibson with The Invictus Choir issued on the Abiah label
- The Loveliest Night of the Year Aaronson/Webster by permission of Sony Music issued on the Abiah label
- Amigos Para Siempre Lloyd-Webber/Black duet with Vincent Niclo Issued on the Abiah label.

== Awards ==
In September 2014, she was appointed Patron of the When You Wish Upon A Star Foundation. (Manchester Branch)

In 2015, Paoli was awarded a Testimonial from Global Children's charity UNICEF.

In May 2017, Premio Barocco awarded for contribution to Italian Arts specifically those of her home region of Apulia

In June 2018, Paoli was nominated for Classic BRIT Awards' Classical Sound of 2018

Glamour Awards

Magna Grecia, honouring Paoli's achievements as an artist and ambassador for Apulian art and culture.
