= Tring Cutting =

Railway cutting in England

Coordinates: 51.802455°N 0.624234°W

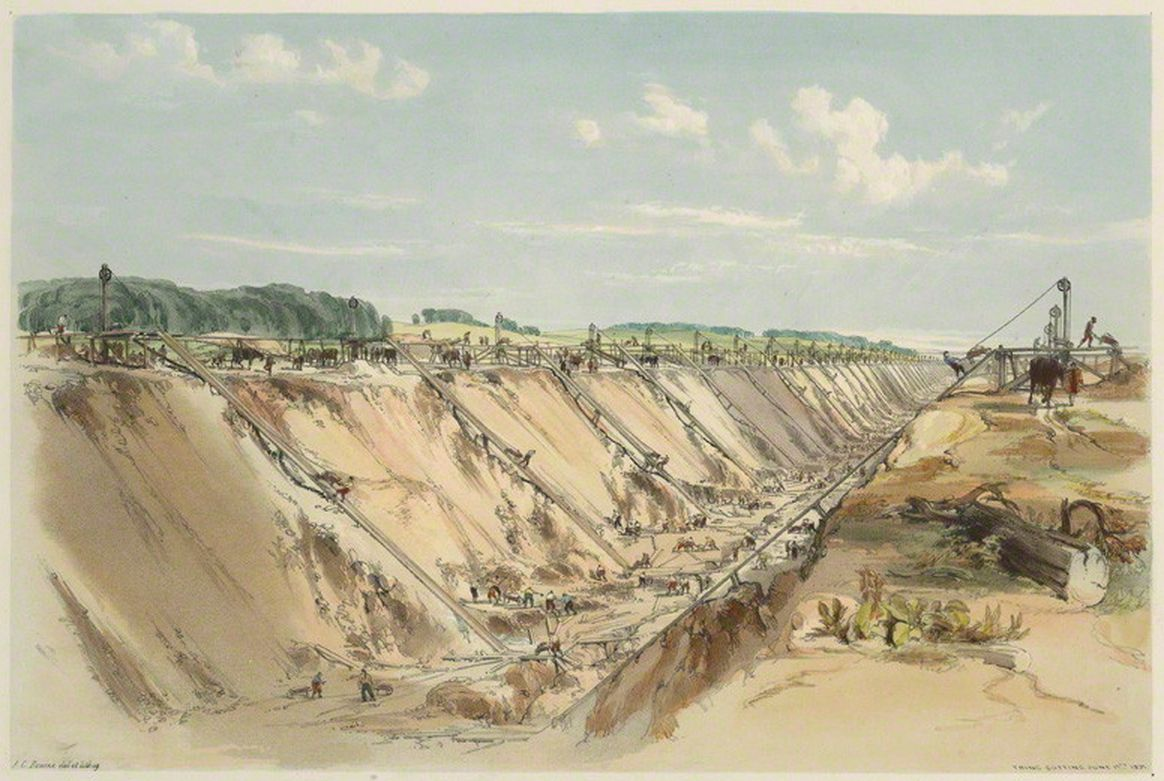
John Cooke Bourne's lithograph showing construction of the cutting

Tring Cutting is an earthwork on the southern part of the West Coast Main Line on the Hertfordshire–Buckinghamshire boundary near Tring in southern England. It was built for the London and Birmingham Railway to the specification of Robert Stephenson and opened with the line in 1837. The cutting is 2.5 miles (4.0 kilometres) long and has an average depth of 40 feet (12 metres) but reaches 60 feet (18 metres) at some points, making it one of the largest engineering works on the London and Birmingham's line. Three bridges that cross the cutting were built at the same time as the line and are listed buildings.

== Engineering ==
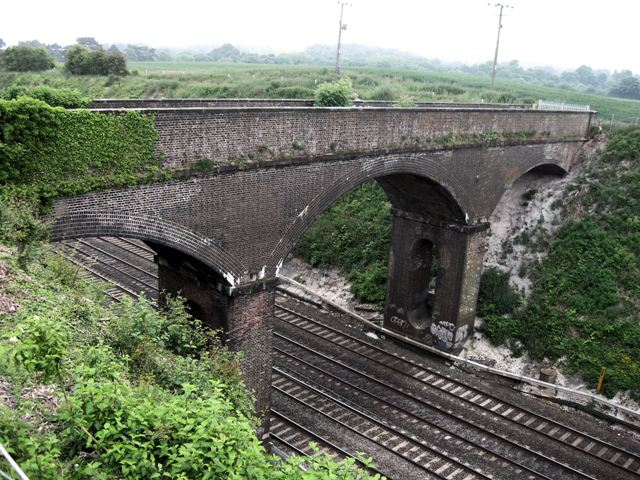
The southernmost bridge across the cutting, an accommodation bridge connecting two parts of a farm that were dissected by the railway

Robert Stephenson, the chief engineer of the London and Birmingham Railway, was determined to keep the gradients on the line to a minimum, which required considerable engineering work to tackle the natural topography. Watford Tunnel was one of the first major engineering challenges, after which the line runs on an embankment through the lower parts of the Chiltern Hills but uses the contours of the land to its advantage, largely following natural valleys and following the alignment of the Grand Junction Canal (now the Grand Union Canal). Beyond Tring railway station, the terrain was more difficult. Although the town, which is to the south-west, is in a gap within the Chilterns, it is surrounded by high ground, necessitating the cutting in order to preserve Stephenson's preferred 1:330 gradient. Beyond the end of the cutting, the railway crosses the edge of the Vale of Aylesbury and begins a gradual descent, having been climbing for most of the route from London so far. Much of the spoil from Tring Cutting was used to build embankments further north on the line.

Tring Cutting is 2.5 miles (4 kilometres) long and was briefly the longest railway cutting in the world. It has an average depth of 40 feet (12 metres) and reaches a maximum depth of 60 feet (18 metres). The sides are angled at 45 degrees and over 1.5 million cubic yards (1.2 million cubic metres) was removed to create the cutting.

Three bridges cross the cutting. All were originally designed by Stephenson and were built at the same time as the cutting. The southernmost, close to the London end of the cutting, is an accommodation bridge which provides access to a piece of land dissected by the railway. The next is Parkhill Bridge, which carries a minor road. The northernmost, Folly Bridge, carries the B489 road between Tring and Dunstable. All three are Grade II listed buildings. The Hertfordshire–Buckinghamshire boundary is in the middle of the road crossing Folly Bridge. They each have three arches in blue engineering brick and stone parapets, except Folly Bridge which has a red-brick parapet. All have been rebuilt to allow for the widening and electrification of the railway. The central arches are 68 feet (21 metres) wide to allow the bridges to cross the tracks in a single span.

== History ==
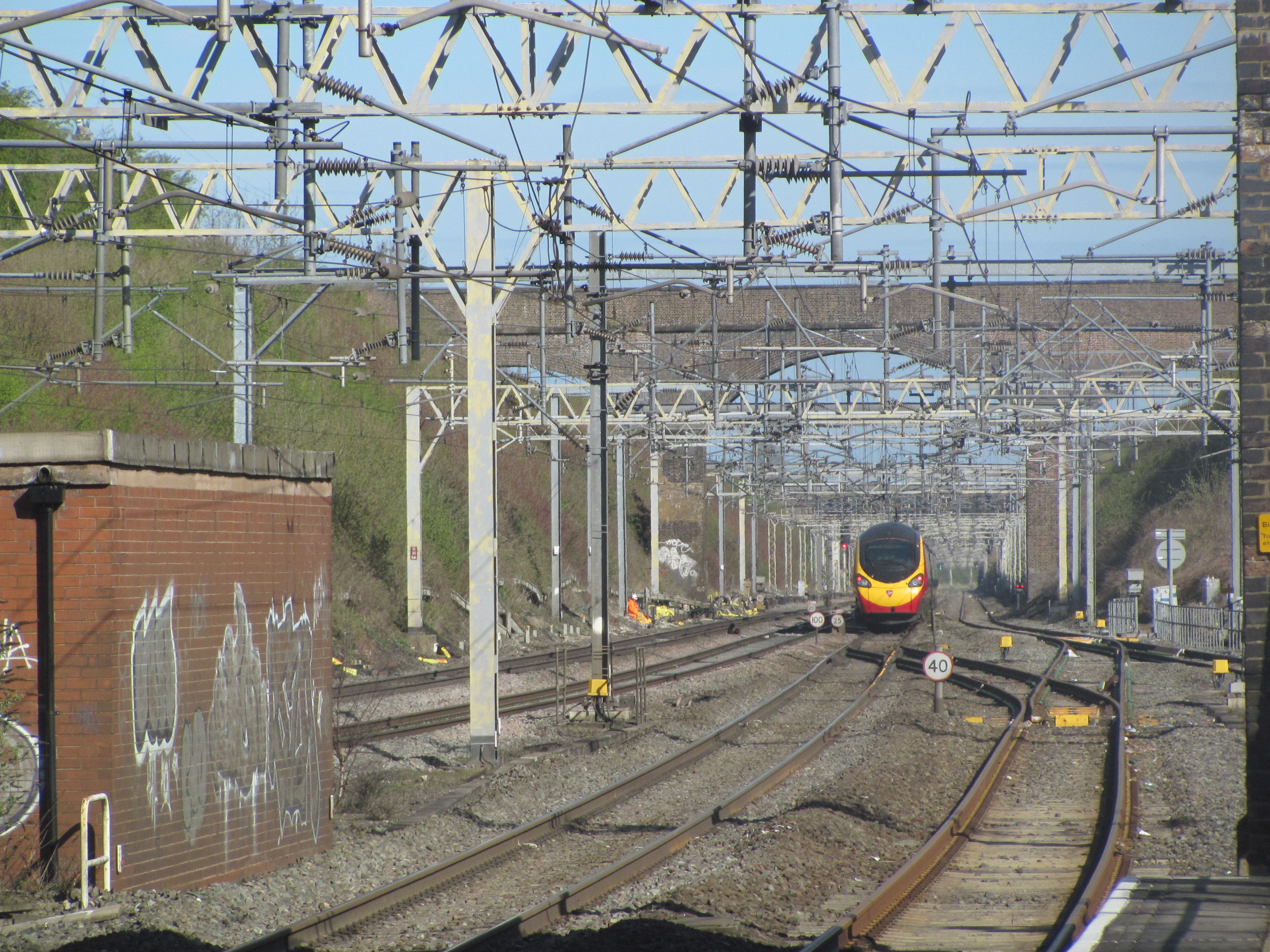
Modern view (2012) looking north from the end of the platform at Tring station

The cutting was excavated entirely by manual labour using an army of navvies, with the exception of some minor use of explosives. Material was extracted from the cutting floor using "barrow runs" or "horse runs"—a wheelbarrow would be tethered to a horse at the top via a pulley and when the horse moved off the navvy would guide his wheelbarrow up the slope along a narrow plank of wood. The manoeuvre was dangerous and the barrow frequently came off the plank, spilling its contents, but only one fatal accident was recorded. The same technique was used elsewhere on the line, most famously at Tring and at Boxmoor Embankment just to the south. Unlike with some of the other cuttings on the line, especially further north at Roade Cutting, the construction at Tring proceeded reasonably smoothly and did not encounter any unexpected obstacles.

John Cooke Bourne illustrated the cutting in his series of lithographs produced to commemorate the opening of the London and Birmingham. The work shows the cutting still under construction and places particular emphasis on the horse runs, which are seen running at regular intervals into the distance.

The line through the cutting was opened to traffic in 1837. The railway was triple-tracked in 1859 and then quadruple-tracked in 1876. The railway company did not procure any further land around the Tring Cutting; instead, it appears the sides were made even steeper and the additional tracks were fitted into the remaining space.
