= Tring Park Mansion =

Country house in Tring, Hertfordshire

Coordinates: 51.79176°N 0.65751°W

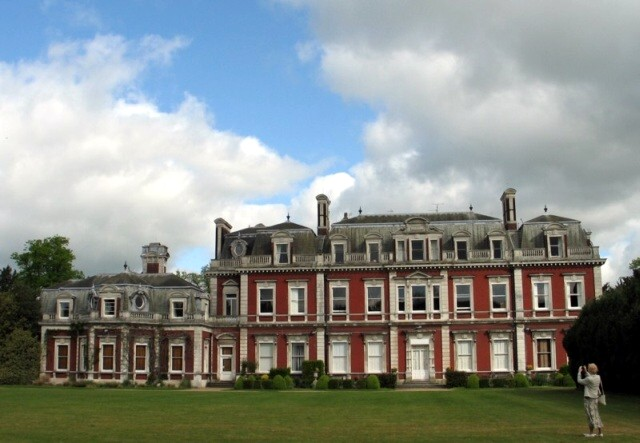
Tring Park Mansion (southern facade)

Tring Park Mansion or Mansion House, Tring Park, is a large country house in Tring, Hertfordshire. The house, as "Tring Park", was used, and from 1872 owned, by members of the Rothschild family from 1838 to 1945.

The mansion and its immediate grounds are now home to the Tring Park School for the Performing Arts. Tring Park now usually refers to that part of the original estate south of the A41. It is public open space, owned by Dacorum Borough Council and managed by the Woodland Trust.

Originally designed by Sir Christopher Wren in the 1680s, the house was considerably expanded in the 1780s and again in the 1880s.

== History ==
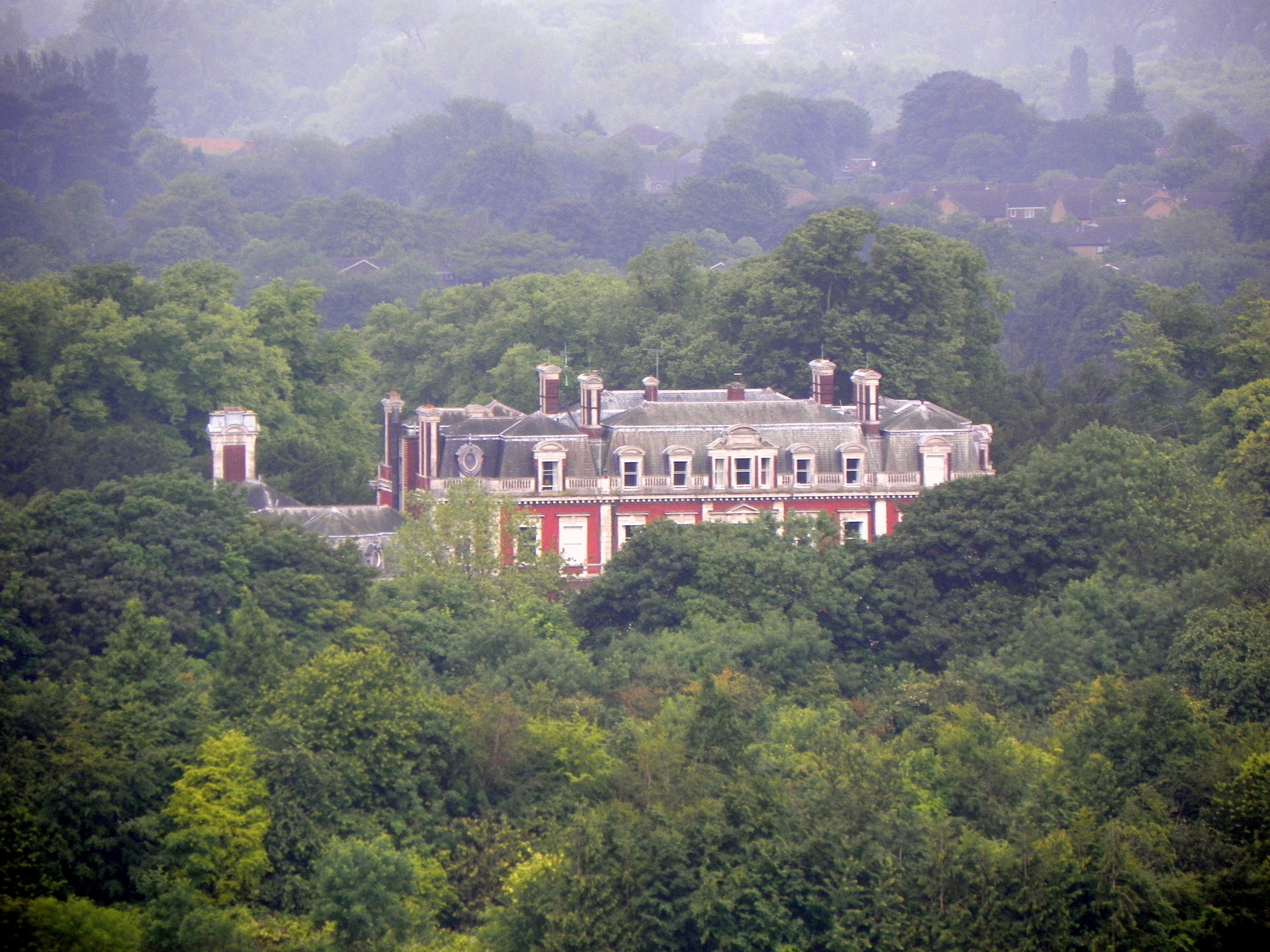
From afar

=== First mention to the 19th century ===
The Manor of Tring is first mentioned in the Domesday Book where it is referred to as "Treunge" and was owned by Eustace III, Count of Boulogne, a countryman of William the Conqueror. The Count's daughter Matilda of Boulogne inherited it from her father and went on to marry Stephen of Blois, a grandson of William the Conqueror. He later became King Stephen of England.

In 1148 King Stephen and Queen Matilda founded the Cluniac order of St Saviour at Faversham in Kent and the Manor of Tring was presented to the abbey. It was later exchanged for other properties with the Archbishop of Canterbury. When Henry VIII dissolved the monasteries during the 1530s, the manor was confiscated and became Crown property and remained in Royalist hands up to the reign of Charles I. In 1650 Charles I arranged to have the manor transferred to his wife, Queen Henrietta Maria, only to have it confiscated by Parliamentary Forces during the English Civil War.

When Charles II was re-established as monarch in the English Restoration in 1660, he gave the house to his Groom of the Bedchamber, Sir Henry Guy in 1680. Guy became Secretary to the Treasury and it was widely believed that he used this position to subsidise the construction of a new manor house to a design by Sir Christopher Wren. Guy was sent to the Tower of London soon after William III and Mary II acceded to the throne in the Glorious Revolution in 1688 on account of his misappropriation of Treasury funds.

Tring Park was sold in 1705 to William Gore, Lord Mayor of London during the reign of Queen Anne. Sir William died after two years and his son William inherited the estate, passing it in 1739 to his son Charles. It was Charles Gore who was responsible for diverting the main Aylesbury to Berkhamsted road from its existing course through the park, which took it straight past the front door of the mansion, to its present route, following considerably flatter terrain further north along the course of what has now become Tring High Street.

The property passed through two further generations of the Gore family before being sold to Sir Drummond Smith, a London banker, in 1786. He made extensive changes both to the park and the house, which until that time had remained unaltered from Wren's original design.

The contours of the parklands were smoothed and flattened to present a more naturalistic outlook in keeping with the style of Capability Brown that was in vogue at the time and the interior of the house was extensively remodelled along the entire south range of reception rooms with the exception of the library, which retained its seventeenth century ceiling. The drawing room and sitting rooms were given moulded and carved plaster ceilings in the rococo style, complete with cherubs and garlands.

Sir Drummond Smith died in 1816 without an heir and the estate was sold to William Kay, a Manchester textile magnate for £90,000. Two years later, Kay's brother built the silk-throwing mill in Brook Street, providing employment for over six hundred people. William Kay's son inherited the house in 1838 and it was from this time that Lionel de Rothschild began renting it as a summer home.

=== The Rothschilds ===
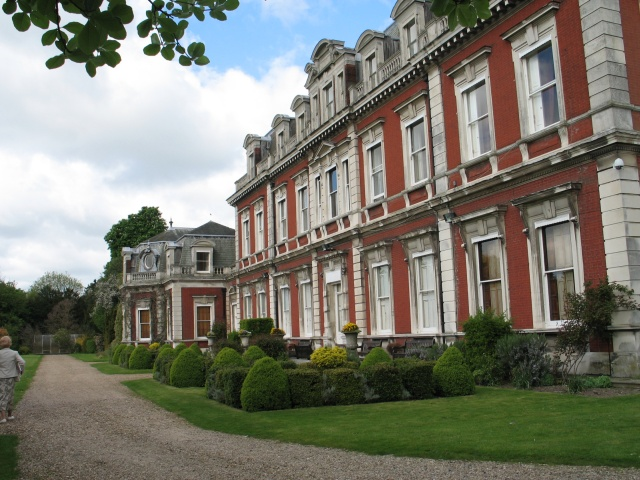
In 2009

When the Kays decided to sell in 1872, Baron Lionel de Rothschild bought Tring Park and its 3,643 acres (14.74 km^{2}), which also included the manors of Miswell, Hastoe, Dunsley and Willstone for £230,000 – this equates to about £8,000,000 in today's money. Lionel gave the property to his son, Nathaniel Mayer Rothschild as an overdue wedding gift. The location was very convenient since he had been Member of Parliament for Aylesbury since 1865 and the Rothschild family had also acquired a number of estates in the area.

In 1872 the family moved to Tring with their son Walter Rothschild, aged four; their daughter Evelina and second son Charles Rothschild were both born at Tring. The family divided their time between their London home at 148 Piccadilly and Tring Park. Lady Rothschild preferred to remain at Tring with her children throughout much of the year and quite often her husband would be on his own at the sprawling London residence, surrounded by dust-sheeted furniture.

Sir Nathaniel became Lord Rothschild in 1885, the first Jewish peer raised to the House of Lords, just as his father, Lionel, had been the first Jewish Member of Parliament to sit in the House of Commons. Lionel was first elected in 1847 but was unable to take his seat in the Commons for another eleven years until the discriminatory legislation against Jews was removed.

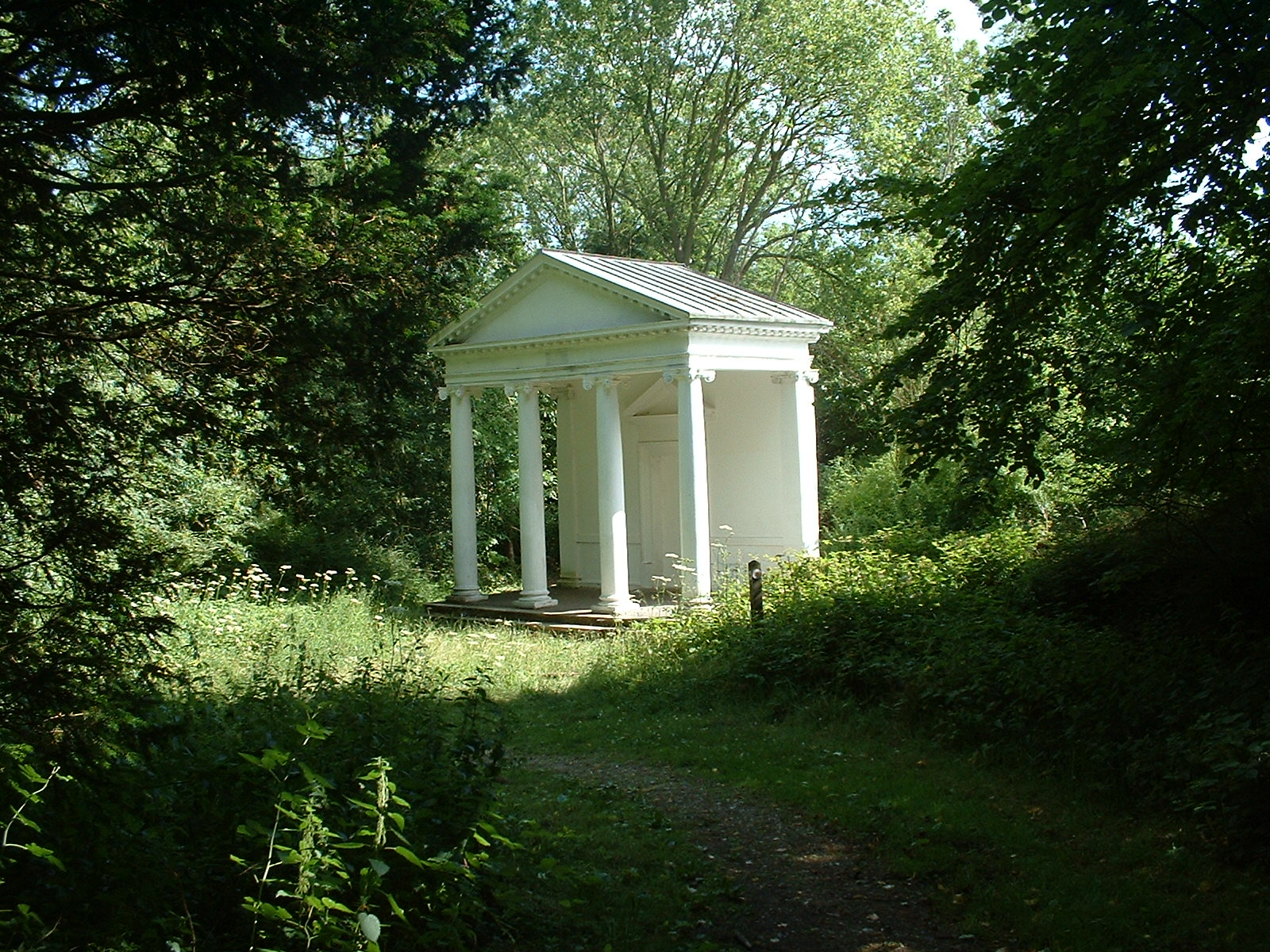
Summerhouse, now in Tring Park

During the late 1880s Lord Rothschild began making significant structural alterations to the house: in 1889 work began on the Smoking Room extension to designs by George Devey and the whole house was refaced in red brick with white ashlar dressing. The conservatory and orangery were demolished (thereby removing the last tenuous link with Nell Gwynne) and the foundations used for the base of the new Smoking Room. In the same year the whole roof was lifted and a full-height top floor was inserted, replacing the mezzanine, with a slate Mansard roof complete with its French-style finials and a ten-foot gilded weathervane.

Lord Rothschild continued to make alterations to Tring Park and these included the controversial rebuilding of the London Lodge in 1895 when two pavilions, believed to be part of Wren's original design and which originally stood on either side of the London Road, were demolished. Despite local protests, the buildings were razed and replaced with a mock-Tudor cottage ( 51°47'40.58"N 0°39'26.21"W ) designed by Tring architect William Huckvale who rebuilt many of the estate's properties in and around Tring. The cupola from one of the Wren pavilions was removed and mounted on the stable block designed by James Gibbs. The cottage still stands today and is partially visible from London Road, beyond a tall brick wall from the same period.

Other alterations to the house included the remodelling of the entrance (east) front where the portico, which had originally faced onto the former Aylesbury to Berkhamsted road through the park, was demolished and a new porte-cochère was built on the north front. The east front was rebuilt with a shallow bow window rising through all three floors and the former entrance hall enclosed by large glass doors at the first set of columns to form another reception room. This room, the Morning Room, originally had a double-height ceiling but was given a massive barrel-vault in order to reduce the visible height of the room.

By the time Walter Rothschild had become a young man, it was clear that he had no interest in the family's banking business. His passion was zoology and it was to this end that he devoted his life's work. The Walter Rothschild Zoological Museum was built in the grounds in 1889 as a twenty-first birthday present. This housed his massive collection of stuffed mammals, birds, reptiles and insects. In 1892 the museum opened to the public and three new wings were added between 1906 and 1912 – the Bird Wing, the Library and the Lepidoptera Hall – in order to accommodate the huge numbers of specimens, amassed by Walter personally and the collectors he employed on his behalf.

Walter's father had always disapproved of his son's consuming interest in zoology and after a particularly serious disagreement – principally with regard to Walter's inability to control his finances concerning the museum – he disinherited his elder son. Whilst the title would pass to Walter, the house and estate were all left to his younger brother, Charles.

Although disinherited, Walter had been by no means cut off without a penny: his father had given him a capital sum of a million pounds to live off. In 1908 this was an indescribably large amount and by the time of his father's death in 1915, Walter's finances were well in hand and he was able to mount overseas expeditions to locate new and exotic specimens as well as to purchase existing collections wholesale. The museum's displays included two-and-a-half million butterflies, set under glass, over three hundred thousand bird skins and copious specimens of mammals and reptiles. These remain to this day supreme examples of Victorian taxidermy.

As a result of Walter's zoological pursuits, Tring Park housed not only his well-known zebras but also emus, rheas and kangaroos, which roamed wild in the parklands. The kangaroos were a nightmare for the gardeners: at 6.30 in the morning, Lord Rothschild would often go riding before breakfast. The kangaroos, with total disregard for the ha-ha separating the park from the grounds, would jump up and spend time roaming around the lawns, digging up and eating the flowers in the formal beds around the drawing room terrace. The gardeners, who had been up since 5am, then had to quickly replant these before Lord Rothschild appeared at the stables.

Walter assumed the title of 2nd Lord Rothschild of Tring in 1915. Three years later, after the end of World War I, the family donated the house's lily pond and immediate grounds to the townspeople of Tring and it became the Memorial Gardens. Once it became evident that Walter would not marry, Lady Rothschild sold her dower house, Champneys near Wigginton (a little over 1 mile/1.7 km east of Tring Park Mansion), in 1923. Walter lived with his mother for the rest of her life and after living at Tring for more than sixty years, Lady Rothschild died peacefully on 8 January 1935 aged 91. Under the terms of his father's will, Walter was now obliged to move out of Tring Park and the house and estate now passed to his brother Charles's branch of the family.

Just two years later the 2nd Baron Rothschild of Tring died in his sleep on 27 August 1937 and the following year Victor, Charles's son – now the 3rd Lord – offered the museum and its collections to the British Museum. Walter's private museum now became part of the Natural History Museum at South Kensington.

The final dissolution of the Tring Park estate came in October 1938 when the estate was broken up and sold piecemeal. It consisted of eleven farms, numerous smallholdings, allotments, cottages and shops in Tring, Aston Clinton, Bucklands, Drayton Beauchamp, Cholesbury, Wigginton, Marsworth and Long Marston as well as the stud farm in Akeman Street.

During World War II the house was used by the N M Rothschild & Sons bank, as a repository for the safe-keeping of documents and valuables outside London. The Tring Home Guard also used the park grounds for exercises and training.

After the end of the war, the bank had no further use for the house and the new Lord Rothschild had no desire to reinstate the estate. The mansion was leased by the Prudential Assurance Company and in 1945 was leased and subsequently purchased by the Cone-Ripman School which, in turn, became the Arts Educational School, Tring Park, which became the Tring Park School for the Performing Arts.

In 1975 the A41 Tring Bypass was opened, splitting the former parklands in two.

== See also ==
- Rothschild properties in England
