= Tring Park =

Public open space in Tring, Hertfordshire, England

Coordinates: 51.7837°N 0.6561°W

Oddy Hill and Tring Park
- Site of Special Scientific Interest
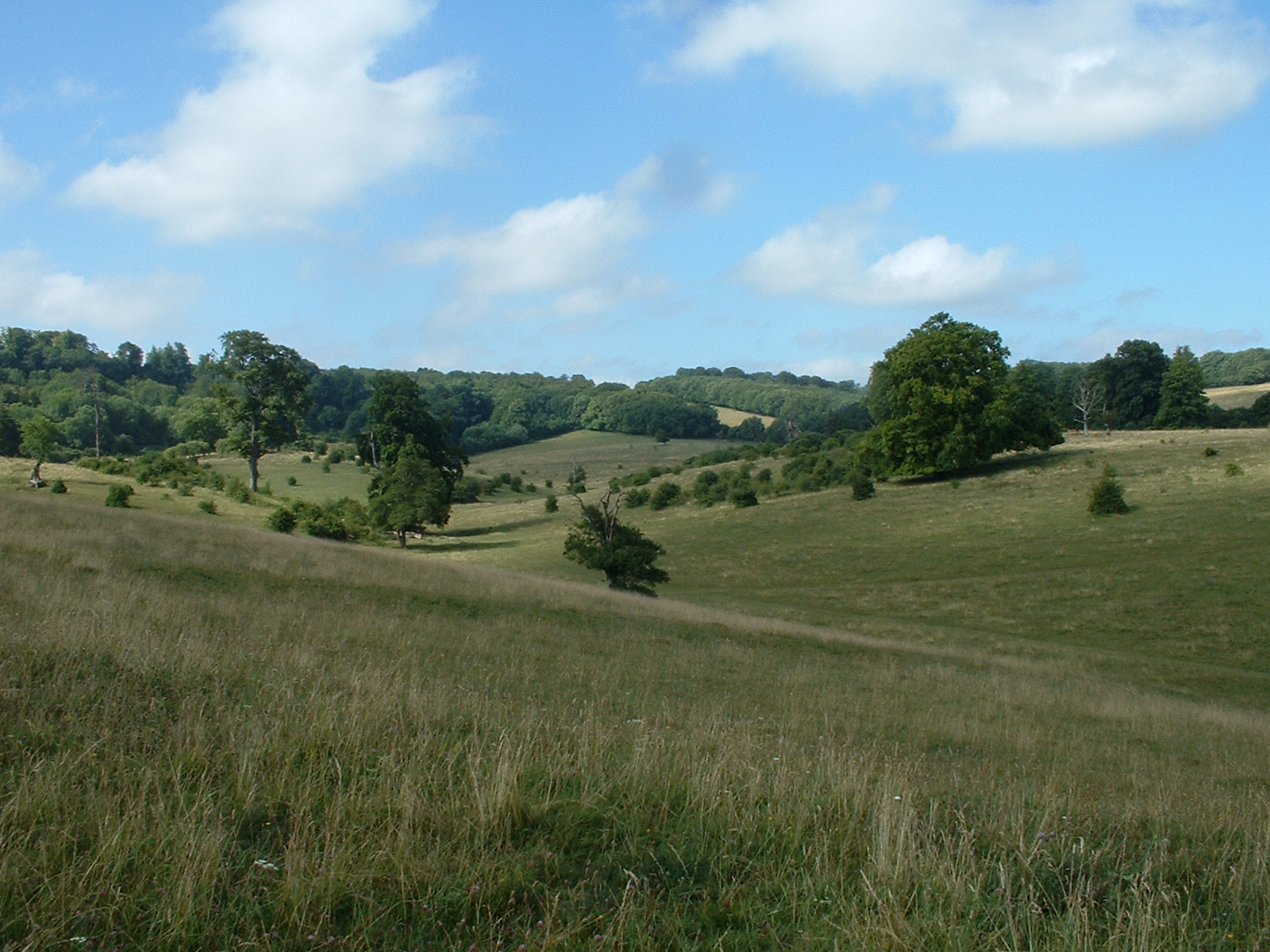
- Location of Oddy Hill and Tring Park.
- Area of search: Hertfordshire
- Grid reference: SP934109; SP928103
- Interest: Biological
- Area: 35.6 ha (88 acres)
- Notification date: 1986
- Location map: Magic Map

Tring Park is a public open space in Tring, owned by Dacorum Borough Council and managed by the Woodland Trust. It is part of the Chilterns Area of Outstanding Natural Beauty. Half of the 264 acres (107 hectares) is undulating grassland, grazed by cattle. Part of the park, together with the nearby Oddy Hill, is the 35.6-hectare (88-acre) biological "Oddy Hill and Tring Park" Site of Special Scientific Interest (SSSI).

The park formerly belonged to Tring Park Mansion, built in 1682 by Christopher Wren and altered externally in the nineteenth century. In the early eighteenth century Charles Bridgeman was employed to lay out the grounds, with a summerhouse and other buildings designed by James Gibbs. The park is Grade II listed by English Heritage in the Register of Historic Parks and Gardens of special historic interest in England.

The two areas of the SSSI are grassland on chalk scarp which have a diverse flora including rare species. Much of the parkland is managed by grazing, but ungrazed scrub on sloping areas provides habitat for invertebrates and breeding birds.

In the wooded Chiltern escarpment are former carriage rides. One of these, King Charles Ride or the King's Ride, forms part of the Ridgeway National Trail. In 2013 work started to restore King Charles Ride by replanting a circle of lime trees at the 'rond point' and improving the vista over the park and town. In the northeast corner are two Grade II listed monuments: an obelisk known locally as Nell Gwynne's monument, and the summerhouse with a grand four-column temple-style portico.

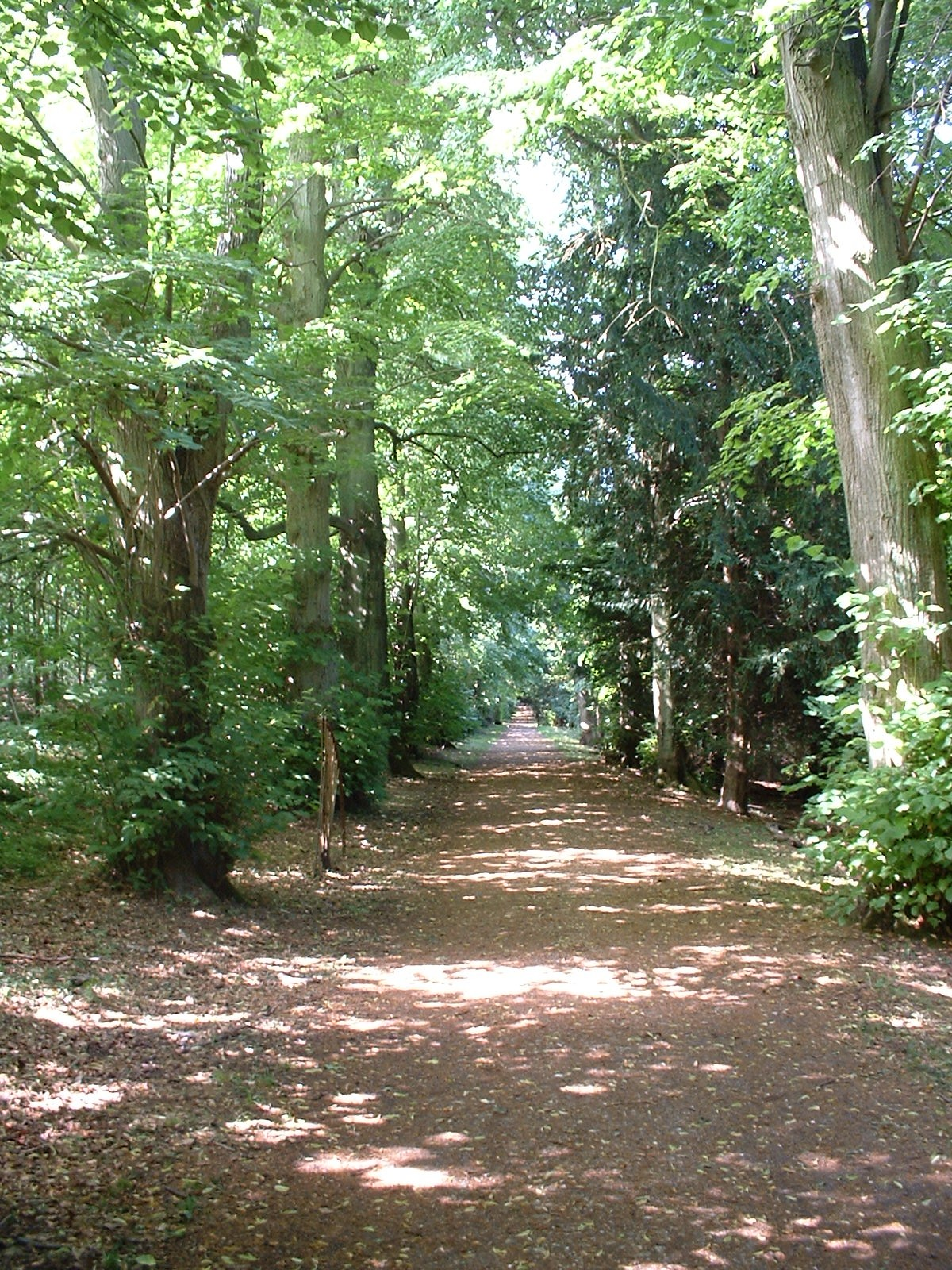
King Charles Ride

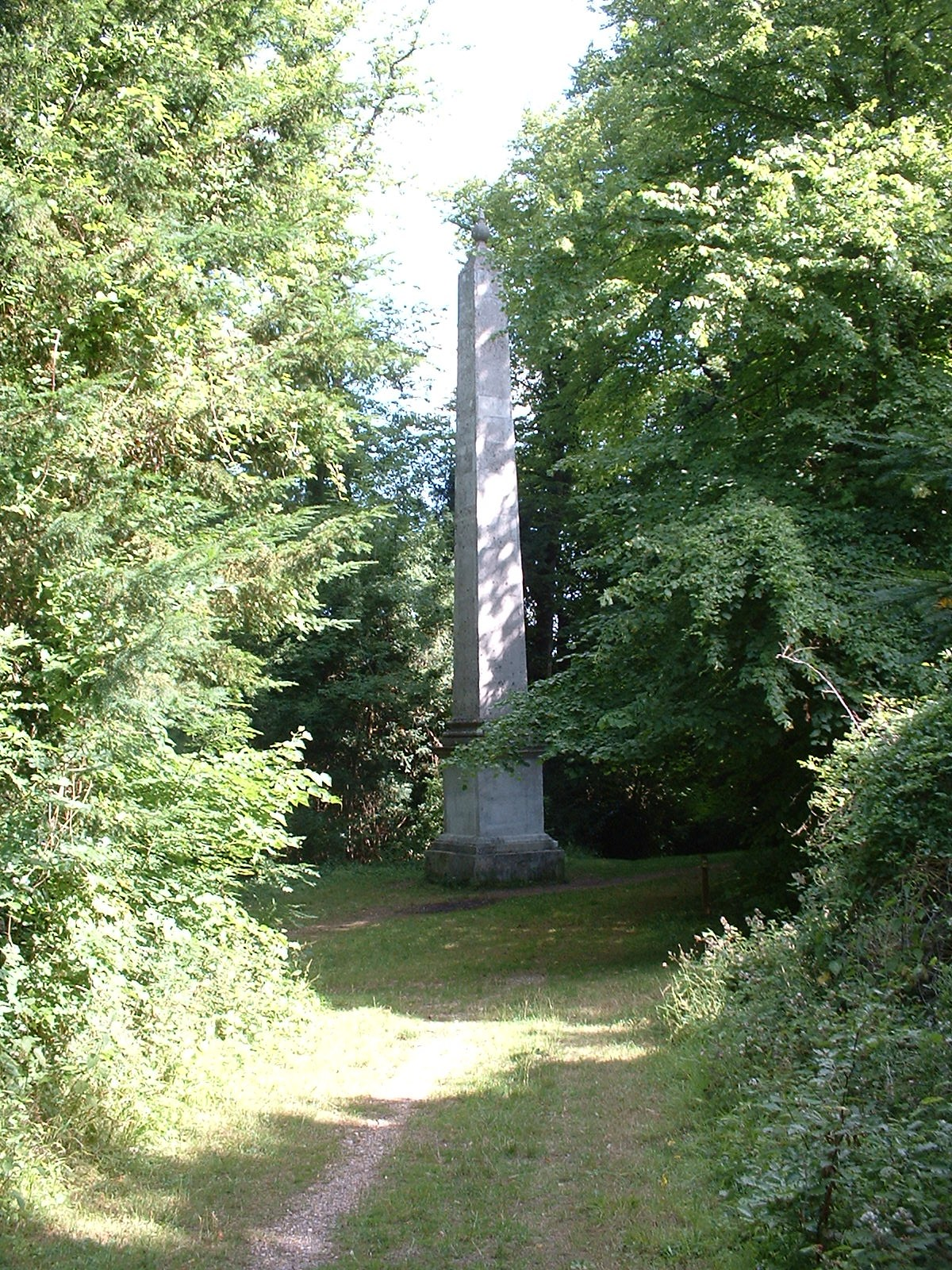
The Obelisk

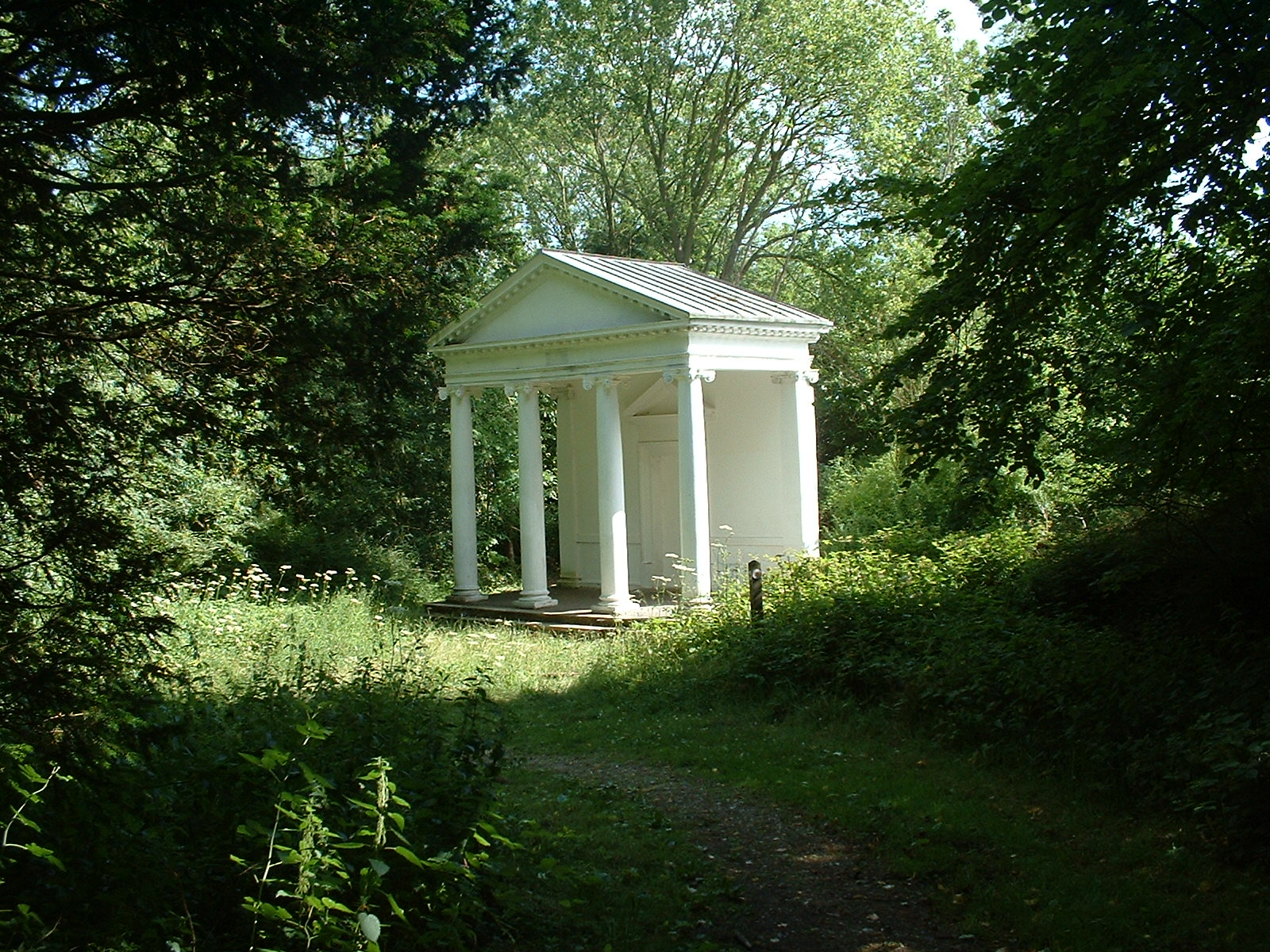
The Summerhouse

== See also ==
- List of Sites of Special Scientific Interest in Hertfordshire
