= Tring Brewery =

Brewery in Tring, Hertfordshire, England

Tring Brewery Company Ltd
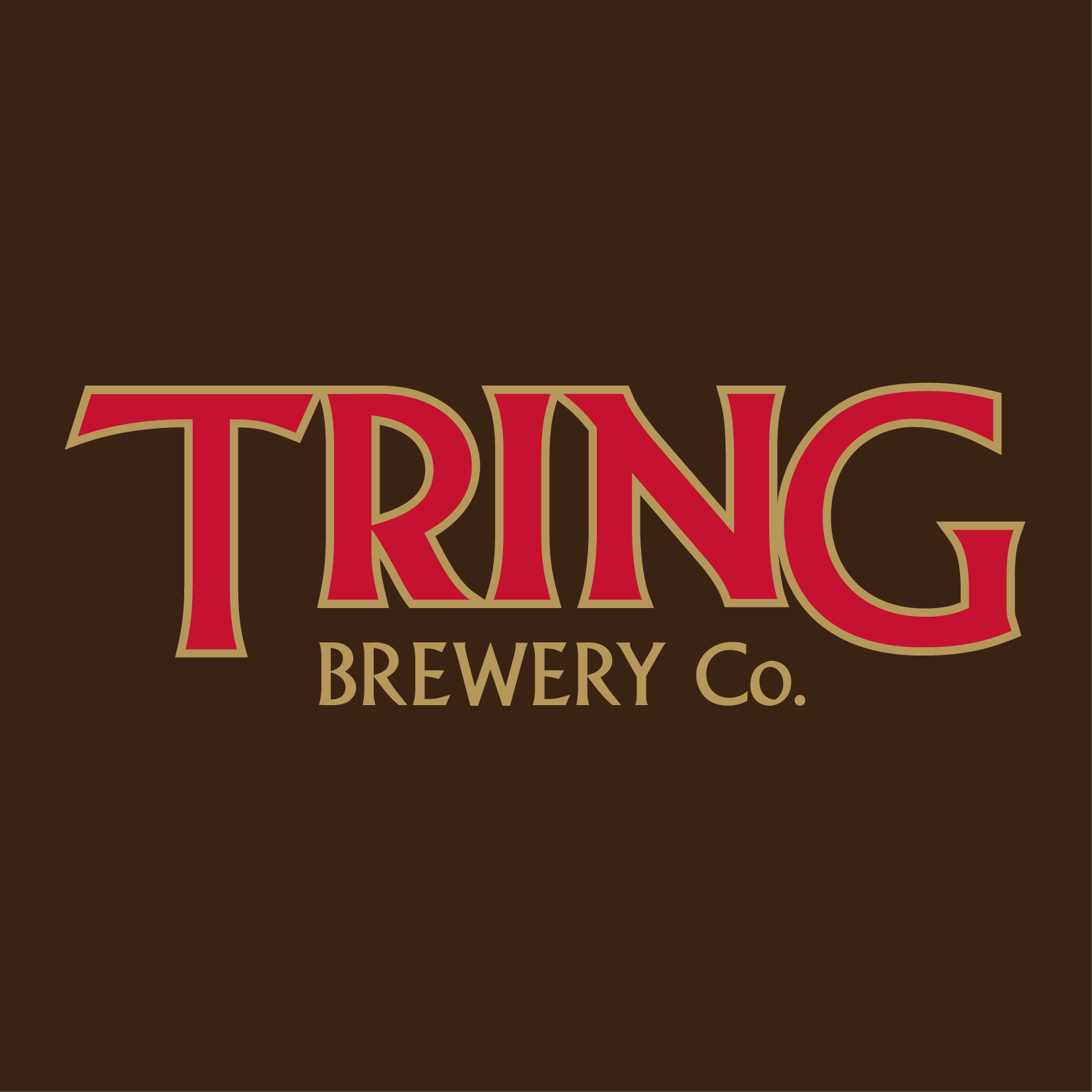
- Industry: Brewing
- Founded: 1992
- Headquarters: Tring, Hertfordshire, UK
- Area served: United Kingdom
- Key people: Richard Shardlow; Andrew Jackson
- Products: Cask, keg and bottled ales
- Website: www.tringbrewery.co.uk

Tring Brewery Co. is a brewery in Tring, Hertfordshire, United Kingdom. The company was started by Richard Shardlow in 1992, who had previous experience with Greene King, Ruddles and Devenish. Andrew Jackson, formerly of Whitbread, started as joint director in 2000, the year the brewery launched their now flagship beer Side Pocket for a Toad.

The brewery is known in the Home Counties for its cask ales, of which various styles are brewed at their location on Dunsley Farm in Tring.

Tring's core range of brews are themed around local Hertfordshire folklore, tying a local connection to their product.

== Beers ==
Regular beers include:

- Side Pocket for a Toad (3.6%)
- Ridgeway Bitter (4.0%)
- Colley's Dog (5.2%)
- Brock Bitter (3.7%)
- Drop Bar Pale Ale (4.0%)
- Tea Kettle Stout (4.7%)
- Pale Four (4.6%)
- Moongazing (4.2%)
- Death Or Glory Barley Wine (7.2%)
- Mansion Mild (3.7%)

The brewery also brews five seasonal ales per year, along with a monthly special every calendar month.

== Awards ==
- Jack O'Legs won CAMRA East Anglia Region Silver Award 2001, and CAMRA Hertfordshire Gold Award 2001
- Colley's Dog won CAMRA East Anglia Region Overall Silver 2004, and was a GBBF Finalist 2005
- Side Pocket for a Toad won SIBA East Anglia Region Silver Award 2002
