= Blue Bridge, Wolverton =

1830s bridge in Milton Keynes, England

- Coordinates: 52°03′21″N 0°48′03″W
- Crosses: Disused cutting, West Coast Main Line
- Locale: Wolverton, Milton Keynes, England
- Maintained by: Network Rail
- Heritage status: Grade II listed building

Characteristics
- Material: Brick
- No. of spans: 5

History
- Opened: 1838

Location
- Interactive map of Blue Bridge, Wolverton

The Blue Bridge is an 1830s bridge over the West Coast Main Line near Wolverton in Milton Keynes (Buckinghamshire), England. Built to take a farm track over a new cutting for the London and Birmingham Railway (L&BR), it was designed by Robert Stephenson, the L&BR's chief engineer and extended in the 1880s when the line was widened. It is a Grade II listed building. When a modern bridge was built alongside (to carry Millers Way over the line), it continued in use for a time as a shared path but, after being declared unsafe, is no longer open for use.

The name "Blue Bridge" is used for a small modern residential district that has been built on the farm land on the east side of the new cutting, to which the bridge provided access.

== Description ==
The bridge is an accommodation bridge, built to provide access to a farm after the road was severed by the construction of the railway. It has three elliptical arches in blue engineering brick which stand on piers of local coursed, squared limestone, faced with rock. The arches have substantial stone imposts and a stone course below parapet level. The parapets are in brick with a combination of stone and concrete coping. The much larger extension was built onto the end of the original. It has a pair of segmental arches almost entirely in blue brick. It has a broad stone roll cornice and a stepped parapet at the far end from the original bridge.

== History ==
The original bridge was designed by Robert Stephenson, the chief engineer to the London and Birmingham Railway, and was opened at roughly the same time as the line in 1838. The extension was built between 1878 and 1882 when the L&BR's successor, the London and North Western Railway doubled the line to four tracks. At the same time, the line was diverted slightly to the east to allow for an extension of Wolverton Works, the L&BR's maintenance depot. The right-of-way under the original bridge is now empty; the main line passes under the extension. Above the line, the road over the bridge was bypassed by a 1970s replacement and is now disused.

The original bridge is unusual among Stephenson's bridges in being built from stone rather than brick, possibly material excavated from the cutting it spans. All other overbridges on this section of line were rebuilt in the 1950s when overhead electrification equipment was installed, making the Blue Bridge a possibly unique survivor. It is one of multiple surviving original L&BR bridges in the vicinity, including a bridge over the canal, that over Old Wolverton Road, and Wolverton Viaduct to the north of the town. The Blue Bridge has been a Grade II listed building 2001. Listed status provides legal protection from demolition or unsympathetic alteration.

== See also ==
- Milton Keynes Museum, which includes the farm-house and outbuildings of Stacey Hill Farm. It is for this farm that the bridge was built.
