= Old Wolverton Road bridge =

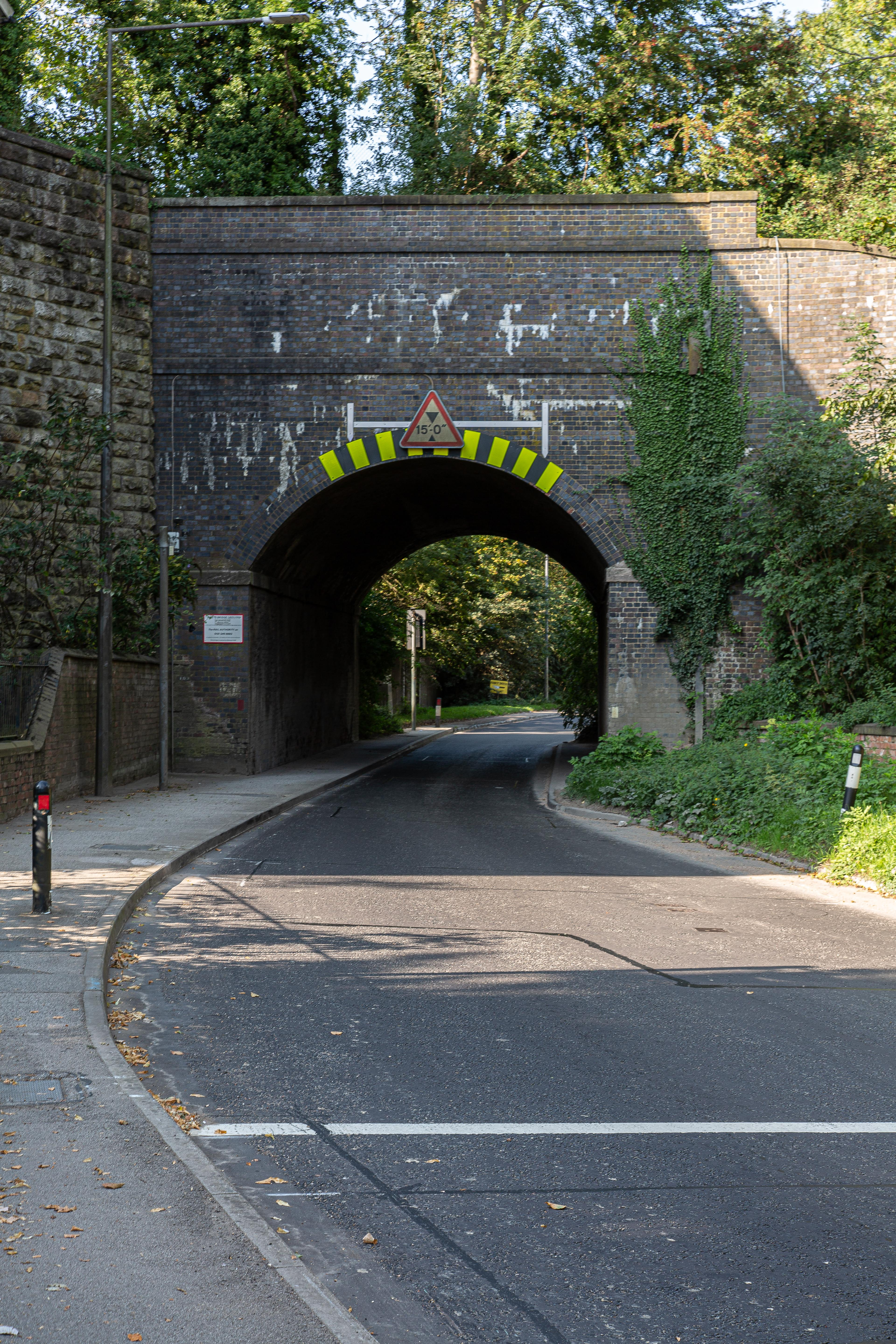
- Coordinates: 52°04′01″N 0°48′29″W
- Carries: West Coast Main Line
- Crosses: Old Wolverton Road
- Locale: Wolverton, Milton Keynes, England
- Maintained by: Network Rail
- Heritage status: Grade II listed building

Characteristics
- Material: Brick
- No. of spans: 1

History
- Opened: 1838

Location
- Interactive map of Old Wolverton Road bridge

Old Wolverton Road Bridge (bridge number 171D) carries the West Coast Main Line over Old Wolverton Road just north of Wolverton Works in Buckinghamshire, southern England. It was designed by Robert Stephenson for the London and Birmingham Railway and opened with the line in 1838. It is a Grade II listed building.

== Description ==
The bridge has a single arch over the road. It was originally built in English bond-style red brick with dressings in red sandstone, though repairs have been undertaken in blue engineering brick. The arch rests on substantial imposts. The bridge is heavily skewed—the railway continues in a straight line while the road passes underneath—giving it elongated wing walls, particularly on its west side. These curve away from the bridge and terminate in stone piers with pyramidical caps. On the east side, the northern retaining wall abuts the railway embankment which was the site of the original Wolverton railway station, since demolished and now occupied by the Royal Train Shed.

== History ==
The bridge was built from 1837 to 1838 and opened with the London and Birmingham Railway's (L&BR) line in 1838. It was designed by the railway's chief engineer, Robert Stephenson. It was widened in the 1880s by the L&BR's successor, the London and North Western Railway, when the line was quadruple-tracked. The extension was built in blue engineering brick, which was also used for repairs to the original structure to the point that it now overwhelms the red brick and little of the 1830s brickwork is visible.

The bridge was designated a Grade II listed building in 2001 in recognition of its historical and architectural significance. Listed building status provides legal protection from demolition or unsympathetic alteration. Wolverton was home to L&BR's engineering works and multiple structures associated with the L&BR survive, including the original bridge over the canal (which now only serves the works), the Blue Bridge, and Wolverton Viaduct to the north. (Note: The London and Birmingham Railway chose Wolverton as the site for its engineering works due to the town being almost equidistant from London and Birmingham, facilitating the changing of engines at the midpoint of the journey.)
