= Royal Train Shed =

Coordinates: 52.0665°N 0.8073°W

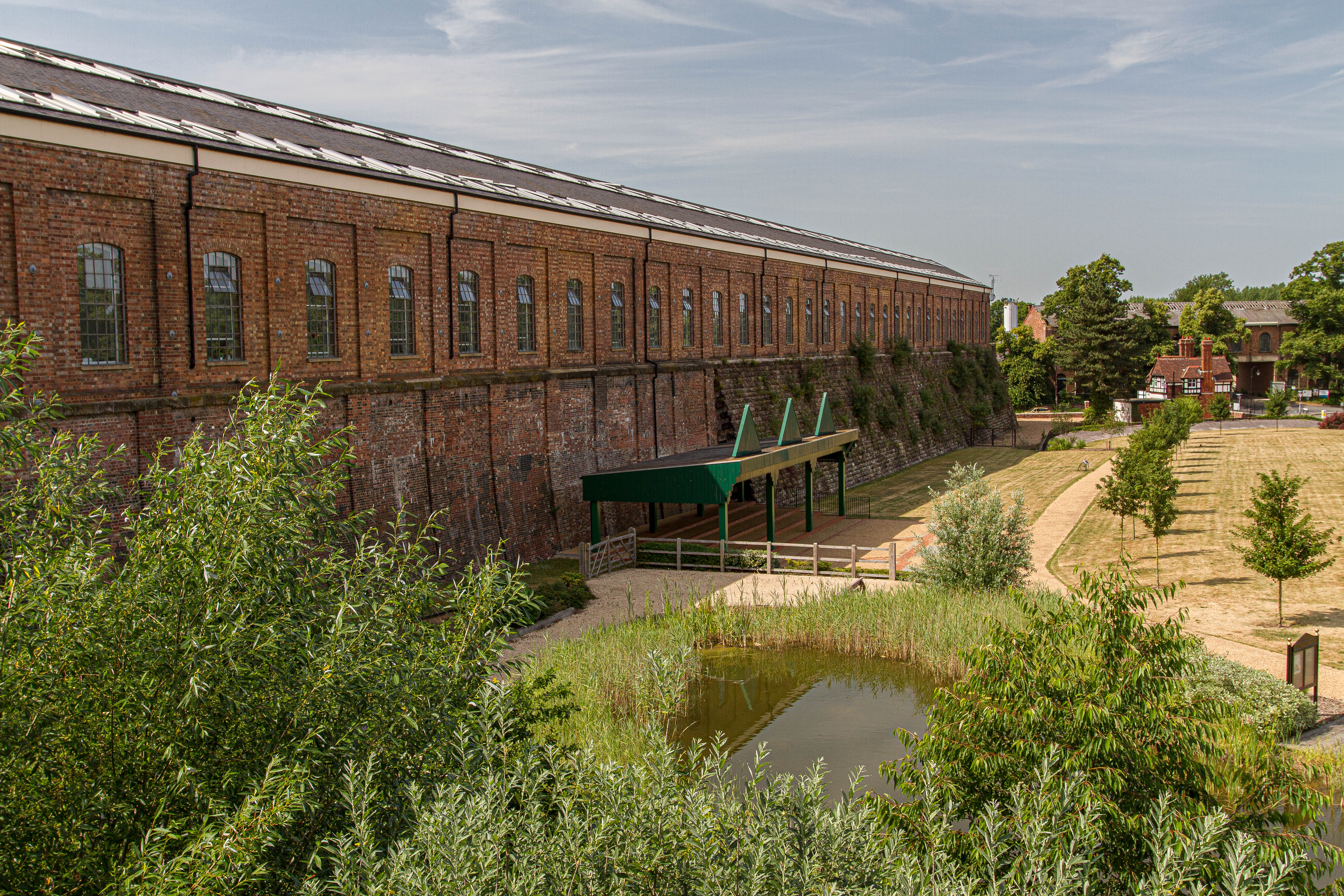
- Interactive map of the Royal Train Shed area

General information
- Year built: 1889
- Closed: 1991

Technical details
- Material: Red brick

Design and construction
- Architect: C. A. Park

The Royal Train Shed was part of the former Wolverton railway works in Milton Keynes, southern England. It was built in 1899 and changed use several times before it was used to house the British Royal Train from 1963 to 1991. The building has since been converted into residential use and is now a Grade II listed building.

== Description ==
The building is sited on an embankment built in the 1830s for the London and Birmingham Railway. The first building on the site was the original Wolverton railway station, which was demolished in the 1840s. The site is just north of the Grand Union Canal and adjacent to an 1830s bridge which was originally part of the main line and abutting the embankment it stands on is an 1830s bridge over Old Wolverton Road.

The building is in red brick and has a slate roof with skylights. It is long and narrow, built to accommodate three tracks, and consists of 33 bays with gable ends. A smaller shed was built onto the north-western end of the original. Both ends have tripartite openings. The bays all have identical windows. The walls are supported by wrought-iron and steel trusses for added strength.

== History ==
The building was first erected in 1889 as part of Wolverton railway works. It was designed by C. A. Park, the carriage and wagon superintendent for the London and North Western Railway as part of a planned overhaul of the layout of the works. It began life as a lifting shop, equipped with cranes for maintenance of carriages. It was converted to an underframe shop in 1926 and then a heavy machine shop in 1934. It was converted to house the Royal Train—which was built in the adjacent works—in 1963. It closed in 1991 After a period of disuse as the works contracted post-privatisation, the building was converted into residences.

The shed was designated a Grade II listed building in 2001. Listed building status provides legal protection from demolition or unsympathetic alteration. Its list entry recognises it as "an important component of what was in the 1890s one of the most important integrated large-scale manufacturing sites in the world".
