= Wolverton Viaduct =

Bridge carrying WCML over the Great Ouse

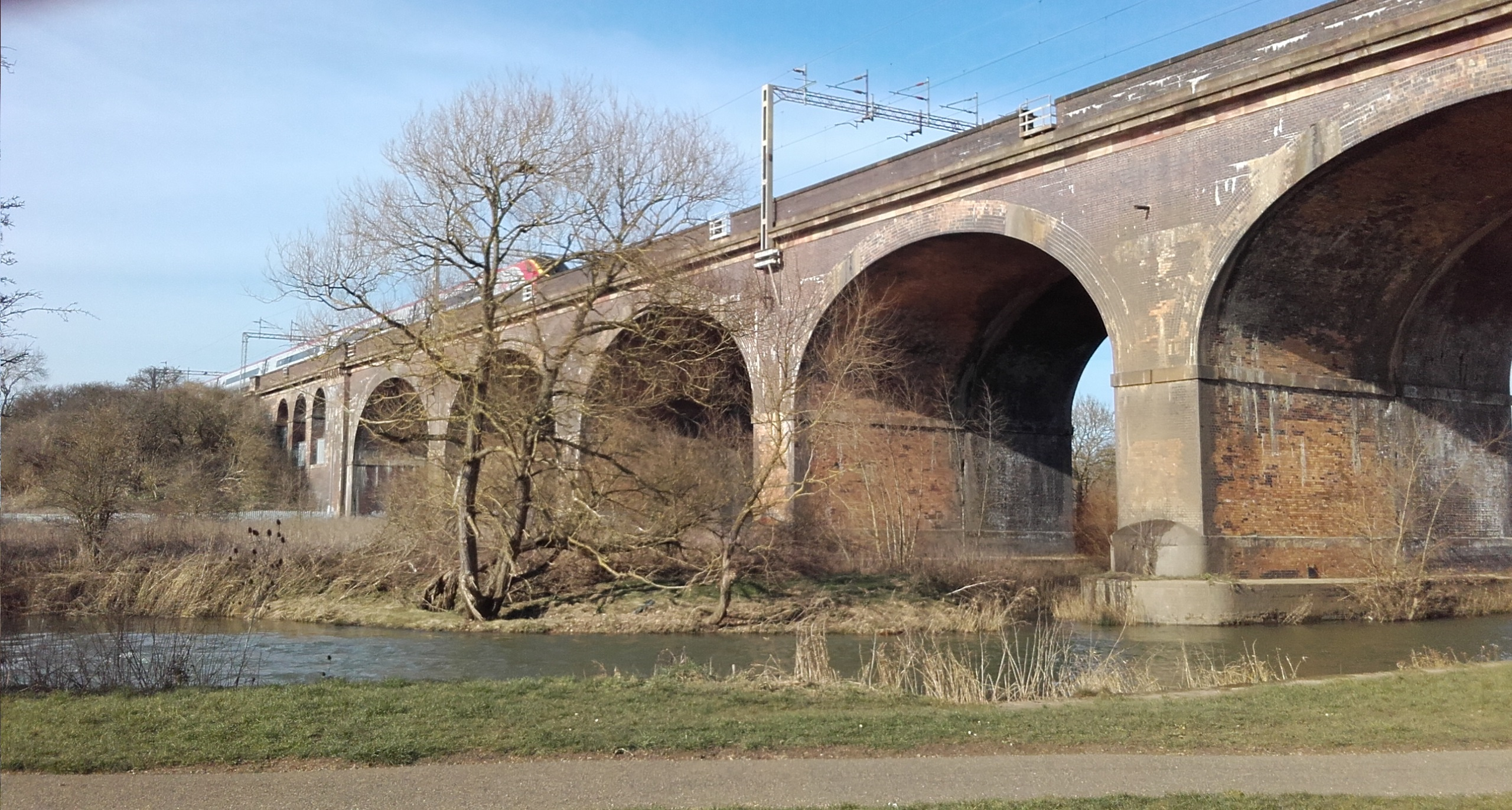
- Coordinates: 52°04′20″N 0°48′42″W
- Carries: West Coast Main Line
- Crosses: River Great Ouse
- Locale: Wolverton, Milton Keynes, England
- Heritage status: Grade II listed building

Characteristics
- Material: Brick
- Total length: 660 ft (200 m)
- Width: 53 ft (16 m)
- Height: 57 ft (17 m)
- No. of spans: 6

History
- Opened: 1838

Location
- Interactive map of Wolverton Viaduct

Wolverton Viaduct is a railway bridge carrying the West Coast Main Line over the River Great Ouse near Wolverton, part of Milton Keynes, in southern England. Built in 1838 for the London and Birmingham Railway (L&BR) to the design of Robert Stephenson, it was the largest viaduct on the L&BR's route. It is in the centre of Wolverton Embankment, itself the largest on the line. It has six brick arches and covers a distance of 660 feet (200 metres), reaching a maximum height of 57 feet (17 metres) above the river, and terminating in substantial abutments which contain decorative arches. The viaduct and embankment feature in drawings by John Cooke Bourne. Several contemporary commentators likened Stephenson's bridges to Roman aqueducts. Some modern engineers and railway historians have suggested that Wolverton Viaduct is not as innovative or impressive as some that followed but nonetheless praised its visual impact.

The cutting caught fire during construction and suffered from slips and settlement problems for several years. The viaduct was widened to take four tracks in the 1880s with a blue-brick extension, in contrast to the red-brick original; the new structure was not bonded to the original and the divide can be clearly seen from underneath. Masts for overhead electrification were added in the 1950s but otherwise the bridge is little changed since it was built. It has common features with several other L&BR viaducts and is now a Grade II listed building.

== Background ==
The London and Birmingham Railway (L&BR) was Britain's first long-distance railway from the capital. Its chief engineer was Robert Stephenson, who was responsible for surveying the route and designing the structures to carry it. Contracts for the construction were let from 1834. Stephenson was determined that the route would have minimal gradients and curves; the ruling gradient on the line is 1:330. Stephenson took advantage of natural valleys and lowlands where possible but the line still required heavy civil engineering works to cross valleys and hills, including viaducts over the Brent and over the Colne, along with Watford Tunnel and Tring Cutting to take the railway through the Chiltern Hills. The work was done by thousands of navvies with hand tools and limited use of horses and gunpowder.

The viaduct is one of multiple structures around Wolverton associated with the L&BR. Wolverton was roughly the half-way point of the route and the availability of land and a good water supply made it the ideal location for the railway's works and there are several other surviving L&BR-era bridges along a short stretch of line, including one across the Grand Union Canal and a skew bridge near the works, and the Blue Bridge further south. The River Great Ouse and its valley, just north of the town, are not deep at this point by comparison with other English rivers but the valley is broad and its floor was 50 feet (15 metres) below the optimal track level for Stephenson's preferred gradient. Hence, the viaduct is one of the largest structures on the line.

== Description ==
The terrain through Wolverton descends gently to the north. To keep the railway level, Stephenson designed the largest embankment on the line, 48 feet (15 metres) high and 1.5 miles (2.4 kilometres) long, broken by the viaduct to cross the river itself. Over thirteen million cubic feet (368,000 cubic metres) of earth was used to construct the embankment, much of it brought by train on temporary tracks.

The viaduct consists of six elliptical arches and is 660 feet (200 metres) long, 53 feet (16 metres) wide (originally), and rises to a maximum 57 feet (17 metres) above the river. It is built from red brick in the English bond pattern and partly dressed in red sandstone. Repairs have been made with blue engineering bricks. The arches stand on rectangular piers, 11 feet 3 inches (3.4 metres) wide at the base and tapering to 10 feet 10 inches (3.30 metres) at the crown. The piers have D-shaped cutwaters.

The bridge has a coped stone parapet which is broken at regular intervals to provide refuges. The piers at each end are much larger and have additional stonework including a frieze. There are substantial abutments at each end, into which are cut four small, rounded arches with a 15-foot (4.6-metre) span. The first two of these rise from a solid wall and start at half the height of the main arches. The third arch is of full height and the fourth is partially buried. A heavy cornice (a decorative horizontal ledge above the arches but below the parapet) runs the length of the bridge, embellished with dentillation (carved blocks) where the terminating piers meet the abutments—a typical feature of Stephenson's bridges.

== History ==
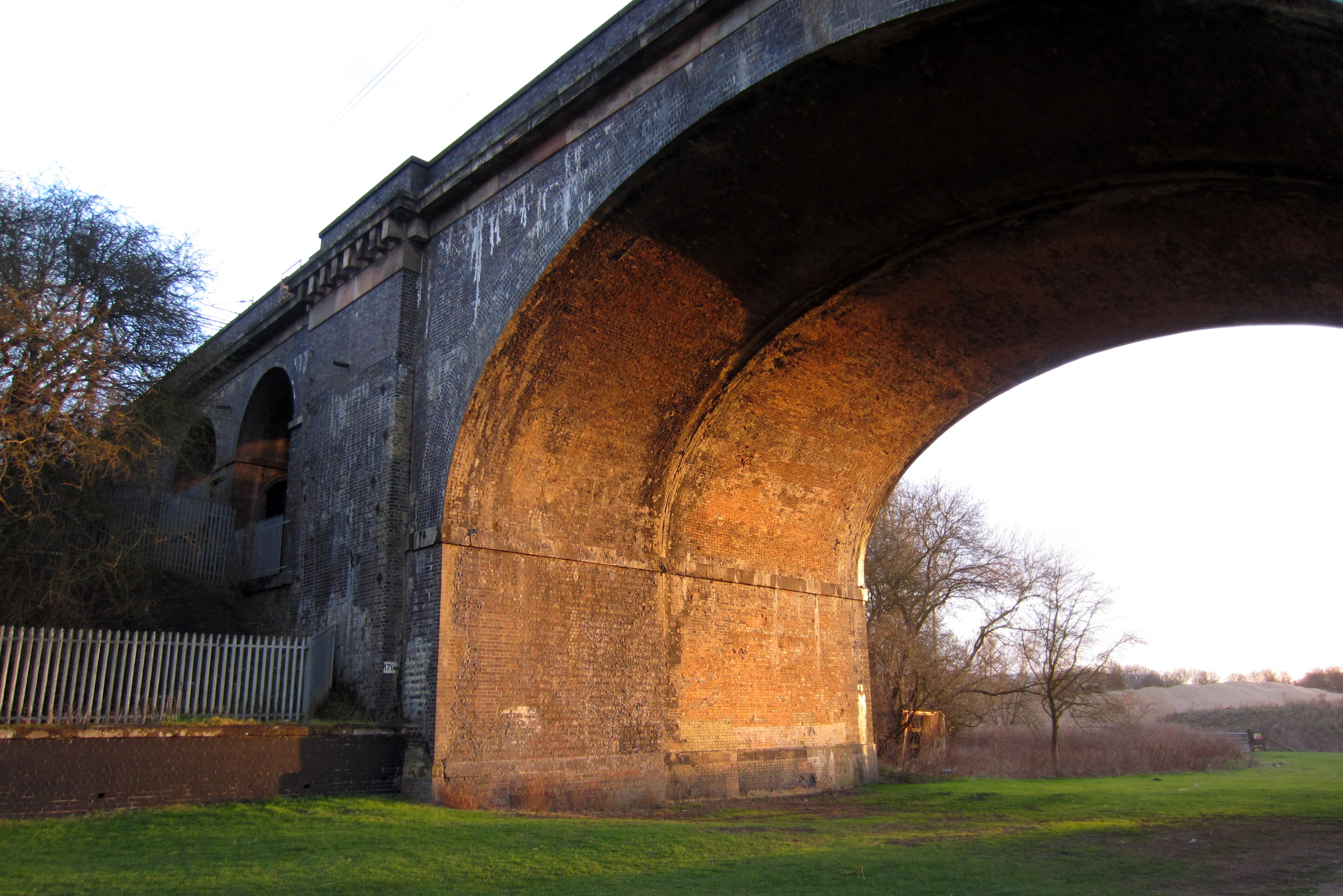
View underneath one of the arches; the divide between the old and new structures is clearly visible

The embankment caused Stephenson considerable problems. Its construction required crossing the Grand Union Canal, whose proprietors were unwilling to cooperate with their new competition. The L&BR were forced to obtain a court injunction to prevent the canal company from demolishing a temporary bridge built to carry temporary tracks for construction trains. During construction, a stretch of the embankment caught fire. Local opinion blamed the canal company but the cause was found to be a combination of flammable minerals in the soil which spontaneously ignited. Soil mechanics were not well understood in the 1830s and the embankment suffered repeated slips and uneven settlement during construction. Even after the work was complete, slips and spills continued to trouble Stephenson until at least 1844.

The cost of the works on the viaduct was £28,000 (approximately £2,684,000 at 2025 prices). Although over budget by 15 per cent, the overrun compares favourably to several of the other major engineering works on the line, especially Kilsby Tunnel which cost over three times its original estimate. The viaduct was complete for the opening of the L&BR in April 1838 but did not open for service until the September because of unforeseen construction delays further north at Kilsby Tunnel. Until the tunnel was complete, trains ran as far as Denbigh Hall and passengers were forwarded to Rugby (a gap of just over 30 miles (48 kilometres)) by stagecoach to complete their journey. The L&BR amalgamated with two other railways to create the London and North Western Railway (LNWR) in 1846. The LNWR doubled the width of the line to four tracks between London and Roade (near Northampton). The widening at Wolverton took the form of an almost identical bridge in blue brick which was built on the eastern side of the existing viaduct in 1882. The join between the two structures can be clearly seen from underneath as the extension is not bonded to the original. The route became part of the West Coast Main Line upon nationalisation in the 20th century. British Rail carried out modernisations, beginning in 1958, which included electrification and masts were attached to the viaduct to carry overhead cables. The viaduct's design is similar to Brandon Viaduct to the north west, between Rugby and Coventry, but Wolverton's is the tallest of several similar viaducts built by the L&BR. The terminating piers and large abutments decorated with arches are common features to several of Stephenson's viaducts and show an early form of design standardisation.

The bridge was designated a Grade II listed building in July 2001. Listed building status provides legal protection from unauthorised demolition or unsympathetic modification and is applied to structures of historical and architectural importance.

== Appreciation ==
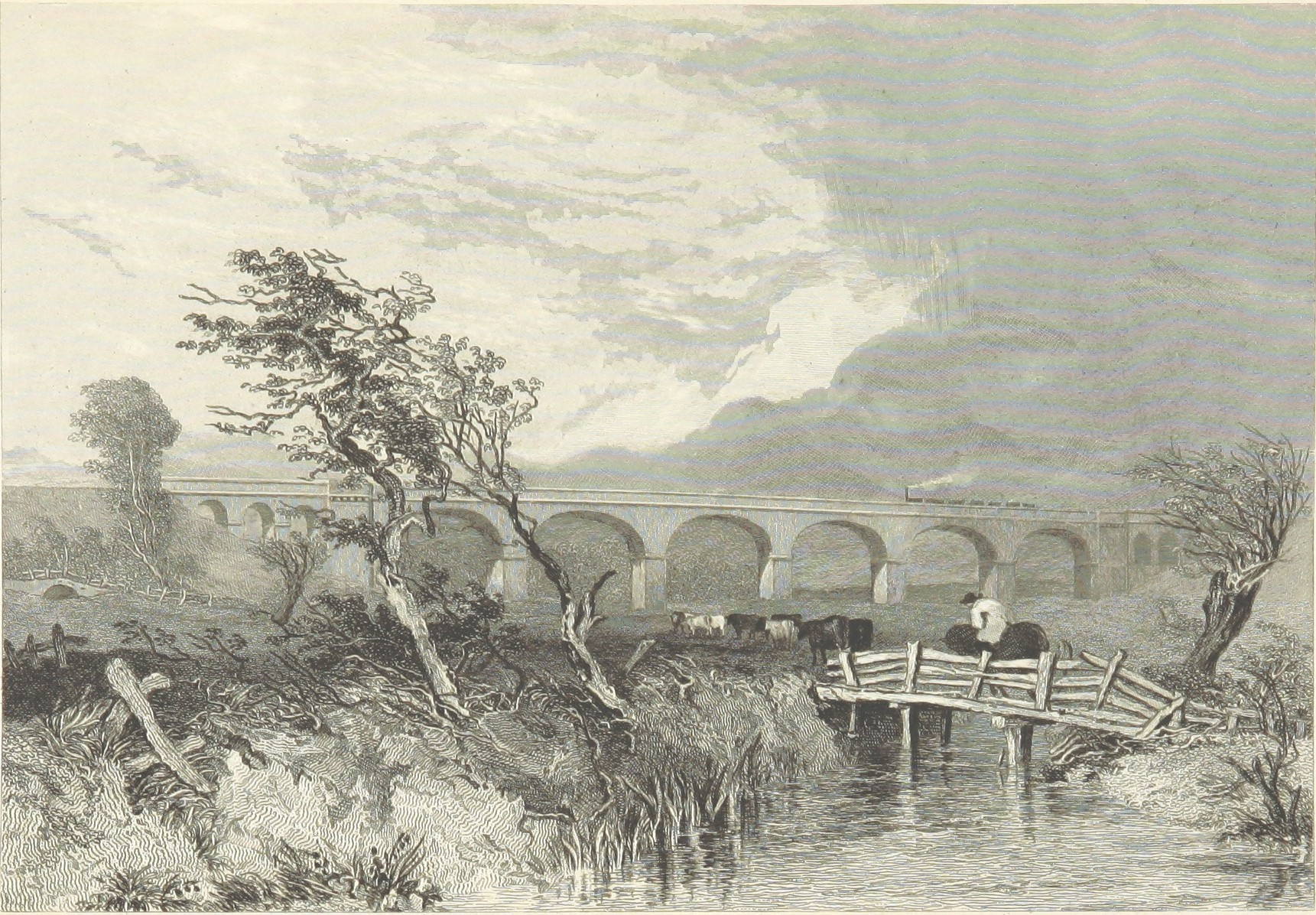
Lithograph of Wolverton Viaduct (1839) by Thomas Roscoe

In 1839, the artist John Cooke Bourne published A Series of Lithographic Drawings on the London and Birmingham Railway, which included illustrations of Wolverton Embankment and Viaduct. Bourne depicts both structures still under construction. The drawing of the embankment shows a train hauling spoil to be tipped at the end; the train is shown in the distance and its diminutive size relative to the embankment conveys the scale of the works and the slow progress involved. Bourne shows the viaduct almost complete but several parts of it are surrounded by scaffolding and two centres (wooden supports used to form the arch) are still on-site. The drawing is typical of Bourne's work in that it shows the bridge as part of the changing landscape. Despite its alterations, the viaduct's appearance is largely the same as in Bourne's illustration.

Upon the opening of the railway, several contemporary commentators compared the scale of the engineering work to Roman engineering and especially Roman aqueducts. Michael Bonavia, a railway historian writing in the 1980s, viewed the comparison favourably and called Wolverton Viaduct in particular "a beautifully balanced structure" with a "classic elegance". The National Heritage List for England's entry on the viaduct describes it as "one of the principal landmarks of the first trunk railway and one of the earliest viaducts on this scale". Gordon Biddle, a railway historian, described it as a "graceful structure" and the "most prominent L&BR monument" in the vicinity of Wolverton, a town dominated by railways. In a history of the L&BR for the 150th anniversary of its opening, David Jenkinson observed that Stephenson's bridges, including Wolverton Viaduct, were "not as daring and spectacular" as many that were to follow, "but in their time they were without parallel and they are mostly still there". Wolverton specifically he described as having a "harmony of style and balance which has rarely been bettered". Derrick Beckett, a civil engineer, reached a similar conclusion, comparing Wolverton unfavourably to Isambard Kingdom Brunel's Wharncliffe Viaduct in west London, built at around the same time, but wrote that "nevertheless [Wolverton] has considerable visual impact".

== See also ==
- Cosgrove Aqueduct, a nearby canal aqueduct over the same river
