= Wolverton Works canal bridge =

Bridge in Milton Keynes, England

Bridge 171C
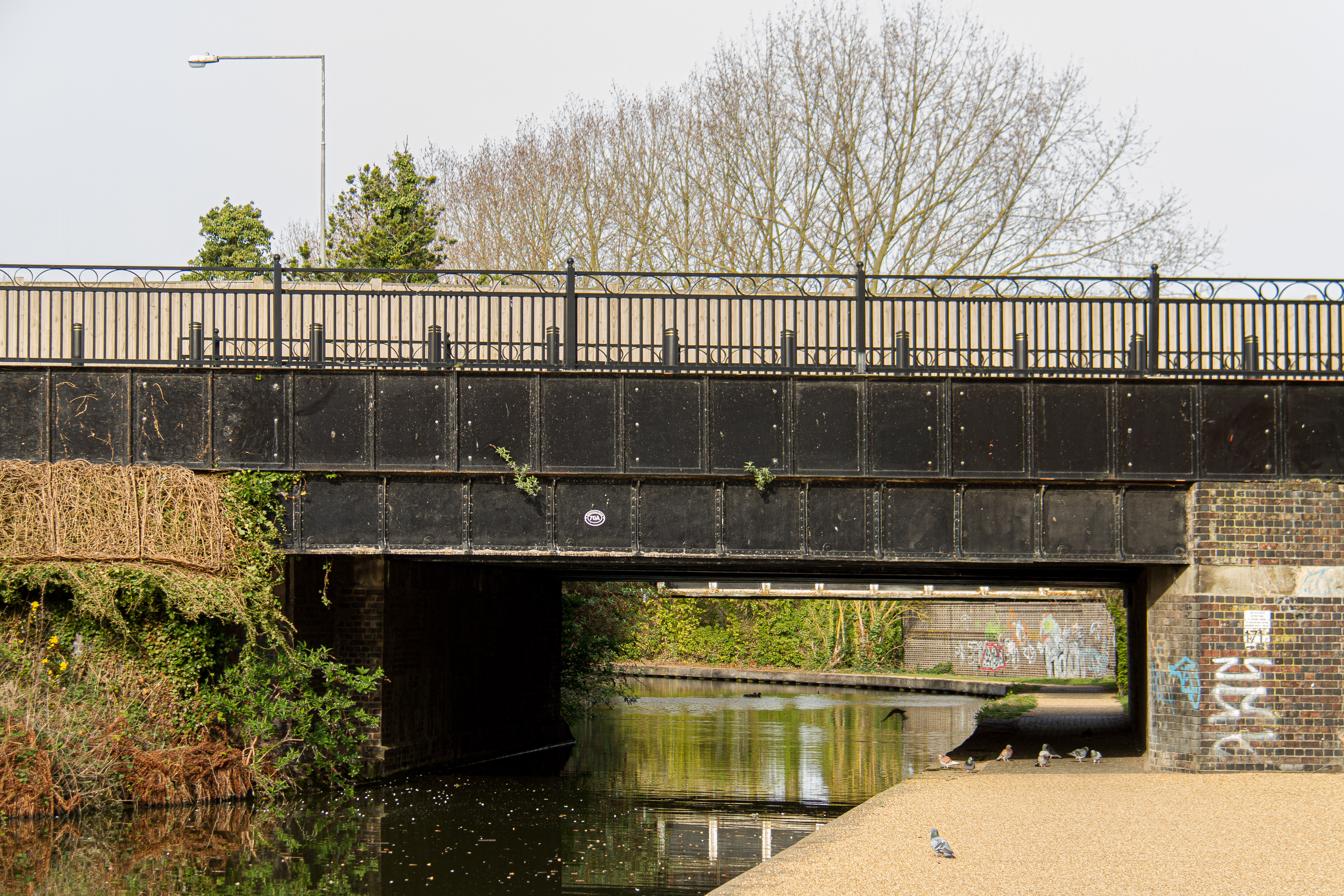
- Coordinates: 52.065291°N 0.806865°W
- Carries: Wolverton works access line
- Crosses: Grand Union Canal
- Locale: Wolverton, England
- Maintained by: Network Rail
- Heritage status: Grade II* listed building

Characteristics
- Material: Cast iron
- No. of spans: 1

History
- Constructed by: Robert Stephenson
- Opened: 1838

Location
- Interactive map of Bridge 171C

The Wolverton Works canal bridge, or Bridge no. 171C, is a bridge over the Grand Union Canal in Wolverton, Milton Keynes in south-eastern England. It carries a spur from the West Coast Main Line into Wolverton Works. It was built in 1834–1835 for the London and Birmingham Railway under the supervision of Robert Stephenson and has been little modified since. It is a grade II* listed building.

== Background ==
Wolverton Works, opened in 1838, was built by the London and Birmingham Railway (L&BR) as its main locomotive maintenance depot. Wolverton, now part of Milton Keynes, was chosen because it was the approximate half-way point of the line. Just to the south is Old Wolverton Road bridge and Blue Bridge and to the north is Wolverton Viaduct, both original to the L&BR. Immediately north of the bridge is the Royal Train Shed.

== Design ==
The bridge carries the tracks across the Grand Union Canal. It consists of 16 cast-iron I-beams supporting the track, with a stone bearing. The abutments are in a combination of red and blue brick. One of the girders contains the manufacturers' mark "Butterley" in relief, referencing the Butterley Company of Derby. The original girders are all cross braced; one, probably the original eastern face, is decorated with moulded timber. When the bridge was widened, steel or wrought iron girders were added on the eastern side. The deck was built from cast iron plates, most of which survive. As built, the bridge had two sections, each eight beams wide, with a gap between them, but the gap was later filled with steelwork. The original balustrades were replaced in the 20th century with timber parapets and steel railings.

== History ==
The bridge, designed by Robert Stephenson, opened in 1838 when the LBR began running train services. The section of line carried by the bridge was originally four tracks wide and part of the LBR's main line. The main line (now known as the West Coast Main Line) originally passed through Wolverton works but in 1882, a new section of line was built to allow trains to bypass the works. Thereafter, traffic over the bridge reduced and it ceased to carry passenger services, possibly explaining why it was never replaced. The bridge was widened in 1889, by which time the LBR had been amalgamated into the London and North Western Railway, using wrought iron instead of cast iron.

Following several failures, many cast-iron beam bridges were replaced and Wolverton's is now a rare survivor, and possibly the only such bridge of its size remaining. The bridge now carries a single track, which is supported on the steel plate across the centre of the structure which was added in the 20th century. Although modified and widened the bridge is still substantially the same structure as when it was built. The bridge, along with the adjacent reading room building, is the oldest intact part of the works. It is a grade II* listed building.

== See also ==
- Grade II* listed buildings in the City of Milton Keynes
