= Wolverton and Stony Stratford Tramway =

Tramway in Buckinghamshire, England

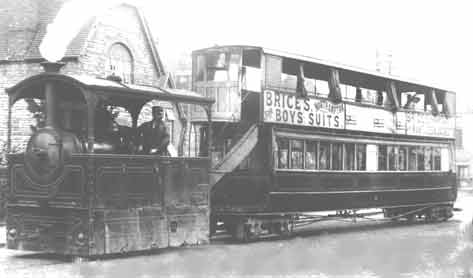
- The Krauss steam tram

Overview
- Locale: Wolverton, England
- Coordinates: 52.060°N 0.837°W

History
- Opened: 17 May 1887
- Closed: 3 May 1926

Technical
- Line length: 4 1/2 miles (7.2 km)
- Track gauge: 3 ft 6 in (1,067 mm)

The Wolverton and Stony Stratford Tramway was a narrow gauge street tramway connecting Wolverton railway station and the Wolverton Works of the London and North Western Railway (LNWR) with Stony Stratford, Buckinghamshire. Although its financial situation was always precarious, except for a period of just under two years between 1889 and 1891, the line was in continuous operation from 1887 to 1926. Between May 1888 to December 1889, an extension also ran from Stony Stratford to Deanshanger in Northamptonshire, via Old Stratford. Unusually for a British street tramway, it was worked entirely by steam locomotives, and was the last of its type to remain in operation.

== History ==
Serious proposals to build a light railway linking Stony Stratford with Wolverton station began to be considered in 1882, mainly due to the growth of the Wolverton Works during the previous decade, and establishment of the adjacent McCorquodale printing works in 1878. The resulting 2-mile-54-chain (2.68 mi; 4.30 km) tramway opened on 17 May 1887, and was reported to have carried more than 21,000 passengers in its first month of operation. In March 1888, a contract to deliver goods on behalf of the LNWR was signed, and on 21 May of the same year, a 2-mile-long (3.2 km) extension to Deanshanger (west of Stony Stratford) was opened, mainly with the intention of carrying goods traffic.

Despite its apparent success, the company quickly ran into financial difficulties and at an extraordinary general meeting of shareholders held in Wolverton on 4 November 1889, an amendment to accept voluntary liquidation was passed. Subsequently, a syndicate of Bedford businessmen led by Herbert Leon purchased the line, which reopened the section between Wolverton and Stony Stratford on 20 November 1891. The Deanshanger extension, however, was to remain permanently closed.

The tramway struggled on as an independent concern, but by 1919 was in an increasingly derelict state and once again in danger of closure. Fearing that the only means of transport for much of its Wolverton workforce would soon disappear, the LNWR stepped in and purchased the line, not only undertaking renovations of the permanent way and rolling stock, but even acquiring a new Bagnall saddle tank locomotive. After the passing of the Railways Act 1921, responsibility for the line passed to the London, Midland and Scottish Railway in 1923. On 4 May 1926, the staff allocated to keep the tramway running on the first day of the General Strike failed to report for duty and the line never carried passengers again.

== Rolling stock ==
The line's original rolling stock consisted of five double-deck passenger cars, built by the Midland Railway Carriage and Wagon Company in Shrewsbury. Whilst similar in appearance to urban counterparts of the period, three of these were the largest tramcars in Britain at the time, being 44 feet (13.4 m) in length with seating for 100 persons. The other cars could carry 80 and 50 passengers, of which the smaller (most probably intended for use at quiet times of day) was the only to have upholstered seats.

Motive power was provided initially by two Krauss 0-4-0 tram locomotives, although on opening day the very first passengers were pulled by horse from Wolverton to Stony Stratford (where one of the locomotives took over for the return journey). With their large canopies and conspicuous oil lamps these engines were unmistakably continental in design, thus the tramway very quickly became known as "the little German", after their country of origin.

Locomotives
Builder	Type	Date	No	Notes
Krauss	0-4-0 tram	1886	2	
Krauss	0-4-0 tram		1	
Green	0-4-0 tram	1887	2	
Brush	0-4-0 tram	1900	1	
Bagnall	0-4-0ST	1922	1	

== Preservation ==
One of the carriages (significantly larger than an AEC Routemaster double-decker bus) is on display at the Milton Keynes Museum on Stacey Hill (southern edge of Wolverton) with a variety of memorabilia.

== See also ==
- British narrow-gauge railways

== Other sources ==
- Prideaux, J.D.C.A. (1978). The English Narrow Gauge Railway. David & Charles. ISBN 0-7153-7511-3.
- "The Wolverton to Stony Stratford Tramway: Memories of the tram". Living Archive, Milton Keynes.
