= Holy Trinity Church, Wolverton =

Church in Old Wolverton, England

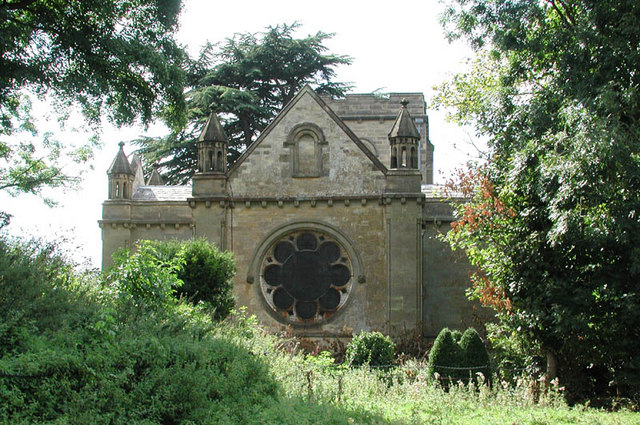
- Holy Trinity Church, Old Wolverton
- Holy Trinity Church, Wolverton
- 52°03′51″N 0°49′47″W
- OS grid reference: SP 80322 41300
- Location: Old Wolverton (Milton Keynes, Buckinghamshire)
- Country: England
- Denomination: Church of England

Architecture
- Style: Gothic Revival
- Years built: 1809–1815

Administration
- Parish: Wolverton

Clergy
- Rector: Revd Gill Barrow-Jones

The Church of the Holy Trinity is a Grade II* listed church, incorporating Saxon and medieval elements, located in Old Wolverton, Milton Keynes, England. The modern church was rebuilt between 1809 and 1815.

== History ==
The Church of the Holy Trinity dates from the 12th century and overlooks the valley of the Ouse river, near the site of the Norman motte-and-bailey castle.

In the early 19th century the old medieval building was replaced by a new church, begun in 1809 and completed in 1815. The new church incorporates the 14th-century central tower of the old church, but this was re-cased in new

Next door to the church is a house built in 1729, which later became the vicarage; the front door has stonework from the nearby, demolished manor house of the 16th century, including the de Longueville family coat of arms, and pieces from the earlier church building.

The church was Grade II* listed on 12 June 1953.

== Holy Trinity today ==
The rector is The Revd Gill Barrow-Jones.

== Churchyard ==
Among those buried in the churchyard are the stonemason George Wills, grandfather of the chemist George S. V. Wills.
