= Stony Stratford =

Market town in Buckinghamshire, England

Coordinates: 52.0567°N 0.8526°W

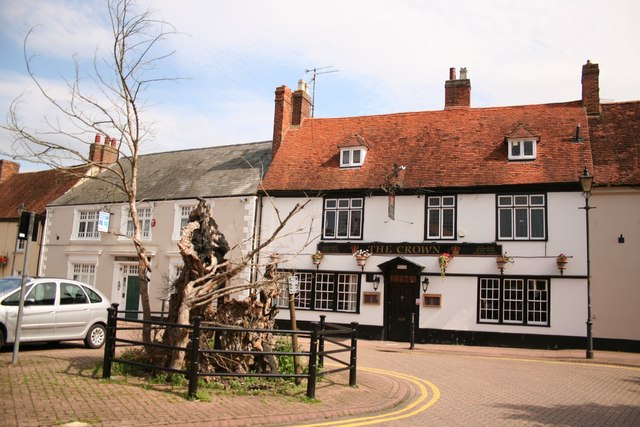
- Market Place, Stony Stratford

- Location within Buckinghamshire
- Interactive map of Stony Stratford
- Population: 7,872 (2021 census)
- OS grid reference: SP787404
- Civil parish: Stony Stratford
- District: City of Milton Keynes
- Unitary authority: Milton Keynes City Council
- Ceremonial county: Buckinghamshire
- Region: South East
- Country: England
- Sovereign state: United Kingdom
- Post town: Milton Keynes
- Postcode district: MK11
- Dialling code: 01908
- Police: Thames Valley
- Fire: Buckinghamshire
- Ambulance: South Central
- UK Parliament: Milton Keynes North
- Website: https://www.stonystratford.gov.uk/

Stony Stratford is a market town in Buckinghamshire and a constituent town of Milton Keynes, England. It is located on Watling Street, the Roman road from London to Chester. It is also a civil parish with a town council in the City of Milton Keynes. It is about 5 miles (8 km) from the city centre, in the north-west corner of the Milton Keynes urban area, just across the River Great Ouse from Northamptonshire. At the 2021 census, the parish had a population of 7,872.

== History ==
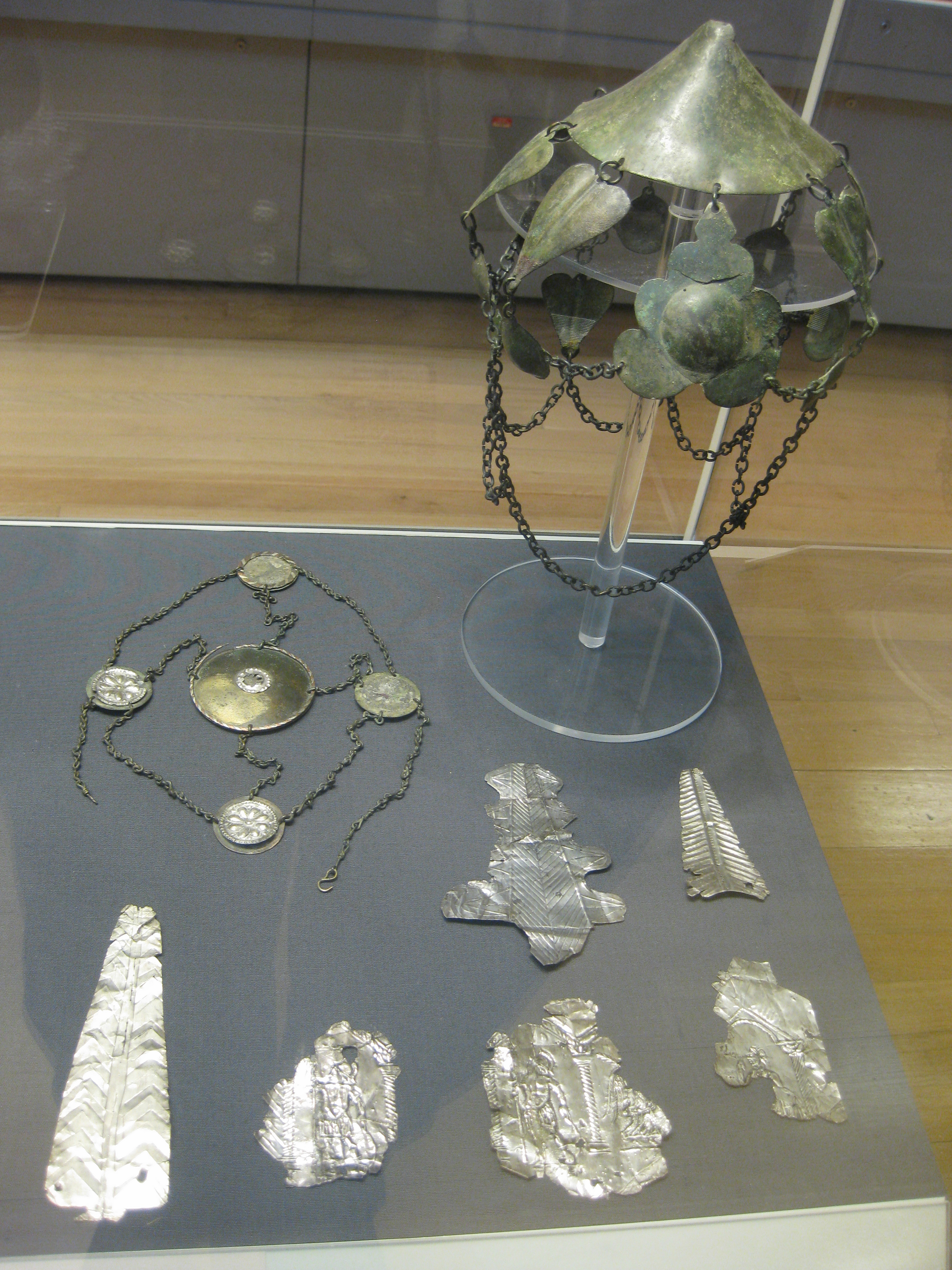
Part of the Stony Stratford Hoard, on display in the British Museum

Since at least Roman times, there has been a settlement here at the ford of Watling Street over the Great Ouse. The town's market charter dates from 1194 and its status as a town from 1215.

The town name is Anglo-Saxon in origin, and means "stony ford on a Roman road". The road in this instance is Watling Street, which runs through the middle of the town and crosses the River Ouse just outside it (nowadays by bridge).

In 1789, at "Windmill Field near Stony Stratford", an urn was uncovered which contained three fibulae and two headdresses. Known as the Stony Stratford Hoard, it also contained around thirty fragments of silver plaques which were decorated with images of the Roman gods Mars, Apollo and Victory. There were also inscriptions to Jupiter and Vulcan leading to theories that this was a votive hoard associated with a Roman temple. The hoard is now kept at the British Museum. The find spot is conjectured to be in Passenham, on the other side of the Ouse.

There has been a chartered market in Stony Stratford since 1194 (by charter of King Richard I). (Until the early 1900s, livestock marts were still held in the market square but in more recent times the square has become a car park, apart from a monthly farmers' market in one corner. The weekly market has moved to Timor Court, and of course no longer deals in livestock). Stony Stratford formally became a town when it received letters patent from King John in 1215.

Stony Stratford was the location where, in 1290, an Eleanor cross was built in memory of the recently deceased Queen Eleanor of Castile, as her funeral cortège had stopped overnight in the town en route to London. The cross was destroyed during the English Civil War.

ARCHBISHOP: Last night, I hear, they lay at Stony Stratford,

— Wm. Shakespeare, Richard III, Act II, Scene 4

The former Rose and Crown Inn at Stony Stratford was reputedly where, in 1483, the boy-king Edward V stayed the night before he was taken to London (to become one of the Princes in the Tower) by his uncle Richard, Duke of Gloucester, who soon became King Richard III. Edward had been returning from Ludlow Castle in the Welsh Marches to London to claim his crown on the death of his father, Edward IV, when he was met in Stony Stratford by his uncle, who later deposed him. The inn is now a private house but a plaque on the front wall commemorates the event.

Catherine of Aragon rode from London to address her troops assembling here for the Battle of Flodden, and went on to stay at Woburn Abbey in September 1513.

The town has twice become almost completely consumed by fire, the first time in 1736 and the second in 1742. The only building to escape the second fire was the tower of the chapel of ease of St Mary Magdalen, now a scheduled monument.

Since at least the 15th century, Stony Stratford was an important stop on the road to Ireland via Chester, becoming quite rich on the proceeds in the 16th century. In the stage coach era of the 17th and early 18th centuries, it was a major resting place and exchange point with the east–west route with coaching inns to accommodate coach travellers. Traffic on Watling Street and the consequent wear and tear to it was such as to necessitate England's first turnpike trust, from Hockliffe to Stony Stratford, in 1707. In the early 19th century, over thirty mail coaches and stagecoaches a day stopped here. That traffic came to an abrupt end in 1838 when the London to Birmingham Railway (now the West Coast Main Line) was opened at Wolverton – ironically, just three years after the bridge over the Ouse had been rebuilt. Wolverton railway works provided an important source of employment in the town, with the Wolverton and Stony Stratford Tramway being built to serve the workers. With the arrival of the motor car, the town's position on the original A5 road made it again an important stopping point for travellers.

The 1841 census lists the population as 1,757.

=== Cock and Bull Story ===
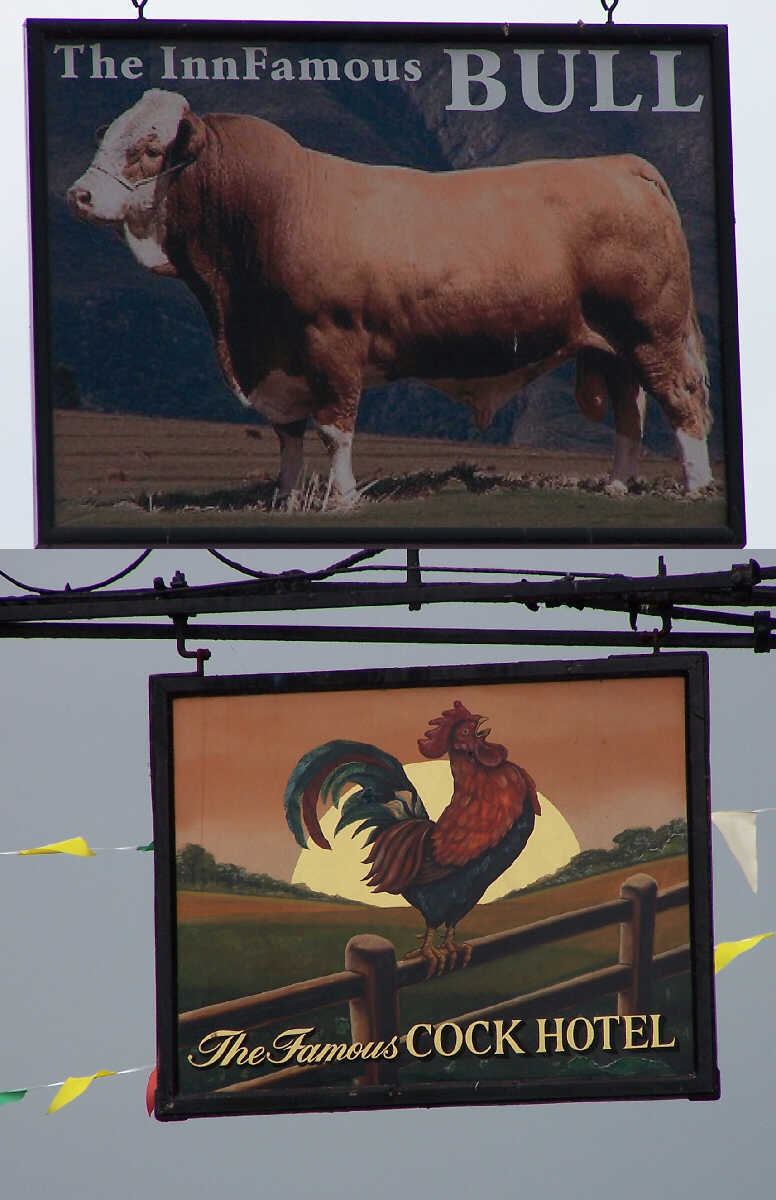
Pub signs of the Cock and the Bull

Due to the juxtaposition of two hotels in the centre of town, The Cock and The Bull (both originally coaching inns on the main London – Chester turnpike), it is claimed locally that the common phrase a cock and bull story originated here.

=== Listed buildings ===
The parish has one scheduled monument, nine 'grade II*' listed buildings, and a further 134 buildings and structures listed at Grade II.

== The modern town ==
Today Stony Stratford is a busy market town. In early June, Stony Live is a week of cultural events that culminates in Folk on the Green, a free festival of folk music, folk rock and eclectic taste that takes over Horsefair Green.

== Sport and leisure ==
=== Football ===
Stony Stratford Town F.C. are a Non-League football club, founded in 1898 who play at Ostler's Lane.

=== Cricket ===
Stony Stratford Cricket Club is an amateur cricket club, officially founded in the 1898, that is based at Ostlers Lane. The club has five senior XI teams that compete on Saturdays in the Northamptonshire Cricket League, two women senior XI teams in the Home Counties Women's Cricket League, a Sunday XI team in the Bedfordshire County Cricket League and an established junior training section that play competitive cricket in the Buckinghamshire CB Junior League.

=== Tennis ===
Stony Stratford Lawn Tennis Club was founded in 1923 and is based at Ostler's Lane. The club have 9 courts of which 7 are floodlit and a new club house. Both Men and Women teams compete in the local Milton Keynes leagues, and Juniors also play in the Aegon Team Tennis League.

=== Bowls ===
Stony Stratford Bowls Club was formed in 1923, and started playing on the present site at Ostler's Lane in 1924. The club compete in the Bletchley and District Bowls League and became league champions in 1994 and 2016.

=== Croquet ===
Stony Stratford Croquet Club play on the Ancell Trust Sports Grounds at Ostler's Lane. The club won the East Anglian Croquet Federation's Handicap League in 2016.

== In film ==
Scenes from the 1987 cult film Withnail and I were filmed in Stony Stratford. Cox and Robinsons chemist is the 'Penrith tea rooms' where Withnail demands "the finest wines known to humanity." The Crown pub became the 'King Henry pub' in the film. Both premises are on Market Square.

== Civil parish ==
=== Historic parish ===
From about 1648, Stony Stratford was divided between the ecclesiastical parishes of Calverton and Wolverton, and covered by two chapelries: St Giles, attached to Calverton; and St Mary Magdalen, attached to Wolverton. St Mary Magdalen dates from about 1450, though only the tower remains from the 1742 fire. St Giles dates from the 15th century (as a chantry chapel), but all but the tower was rebuilt in 1776 to accommodate the parishioners of St Mary Magdalen.

A single civil parish of "Stony Stratford" is recorded in 1767, which was divided in the "late 18th century" in Stony Stratford East and Stony Stratford West CPs. Both the civil parishes became part of Wolverton Urban District in 1919. These urban parishes were wound up in 1927 and both added to the parish of Wolverton.

In 1974, Wolverton Urban District became of the (then) Borough of Milton Keynes.

=== Modern parish ===
The civil parish consists of the land north of H2 Millers Way to the south, the boundary with Calverton parish to the west, the Great Ouse (and Northamptonshire) to the north and west, and the A5 road to the east. The V4 Watling Street becomes Queen Eleanor Street here as it follows the original Stony Stratford bypass. Its districts are these:

- Stony Stratford itself (defined H1 Ridgeway (and reservation) to the southeast, the Calverton border to the southwest, then river around west to north, and Queen Eleanor Street to the east and southeast)
- Galley Hill (H1 to the southeast, V4 to the southwest and the A5 around to the north-east).
- Fullers Slade (H2 to the southeast, H1 to the northwest, V4 Watling Street to the southwest and the A5 to the northeast).

The modern civil parish was established in 2001.

== Transport ==
=== Road ===
The town is no longer on any national routes. Watling Street, a Roman road, runs through the town (where it is called "London Road", "High Street" and "Towcester Road"): this was route of the A5 until it was rerouted (twice) onto new alignments in the latter half of the 20th century. Today, the A5 (towards Towcester or Dunstable), the A422 westbound (towards Buckingham) and the A508 (towards Northampton) meet about 1 mile (1.6 km) away, at a roundabout just north of Old Stratford. Local roads link the town directly to Fenny Stratford, Wolverton and Winslow.

=== Rail ===
The nearest station to the town is Wolverton (about 2 miles (3.2 km) away), and is on the West Coast Main Line though only local stopping trains call there. Intercity services stop at Milton Keynes Central, about 5 miles (8.0 km) away.

From 1887 to 1926, the Wolverton and Stony Stratford Tramway linked Stony Stratford with Wolverton and (briefly) Deanshanger.

=== Bus ===
Bus 6 (Arriva) connects the town with Wolverton or Central Milton Keynes, Bletchley and the Lakes Estate; bus X6 (also operated by Arriva) connects the town with Aylesbury via Buckingham or Central Milton Keynes via Milton Keynes Central railway station

MK City Council also operates an on demand bus service known as "MK Connect", which serves the whole MK unitary authority area, including Stony Stratford.

== Images of Stony Stratford ==
Stony Stratford images
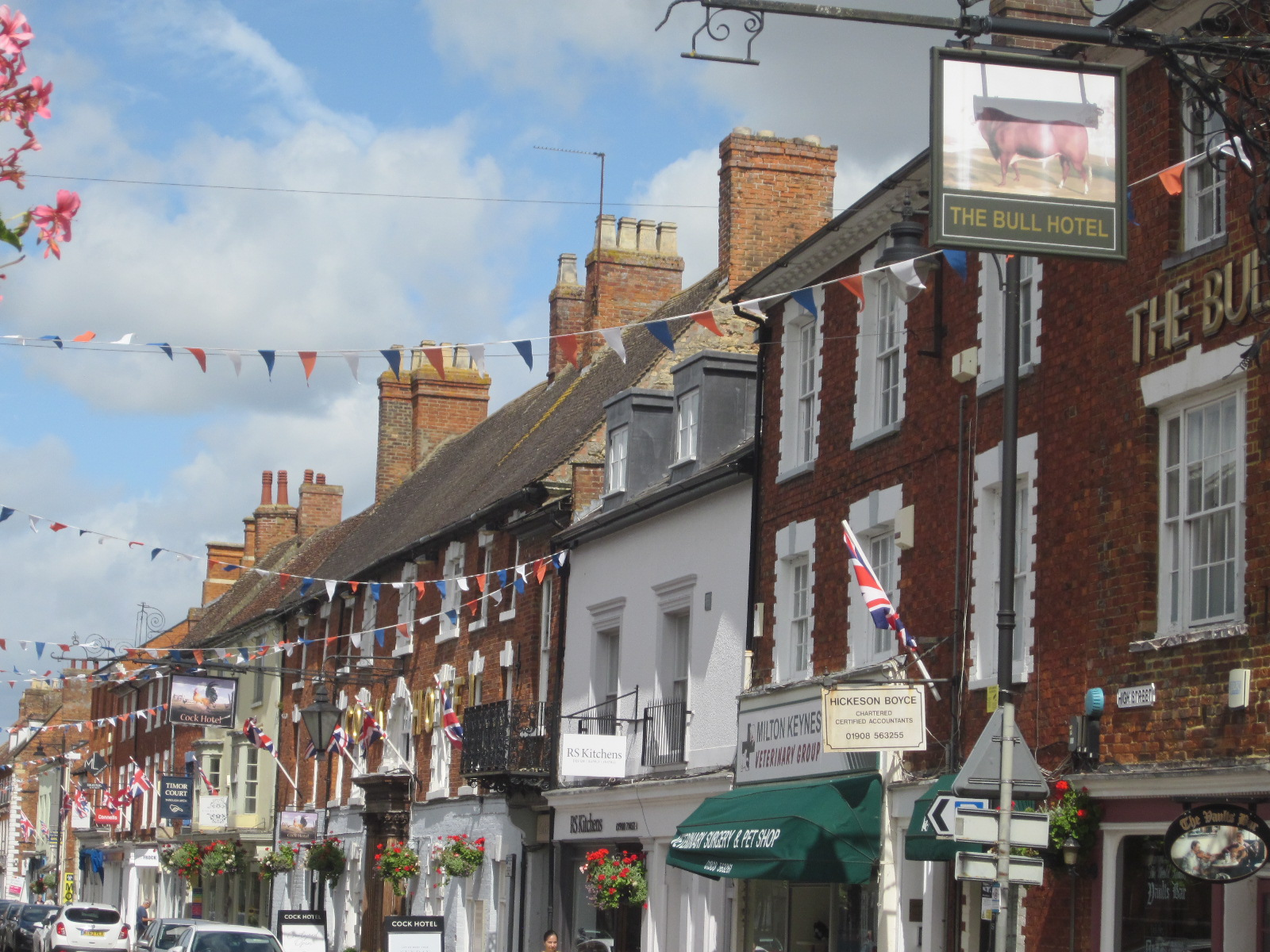
The High Street in festive mood

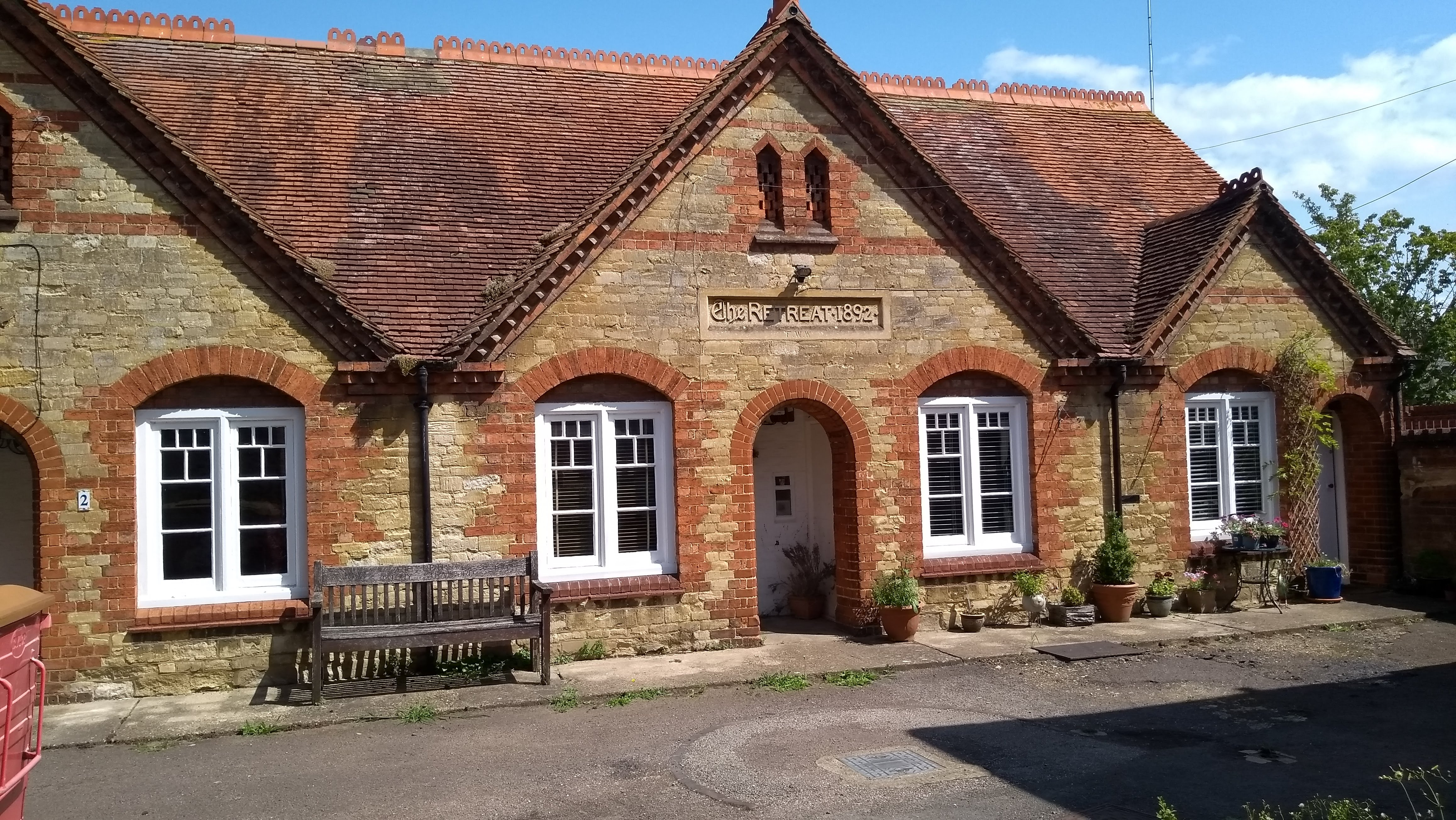
"The Retreat" (Almshouses in Queen Anne Revival style, one of a number of buildings in the town by local architect Swinfen Harris.) 1892. Listed Grade II

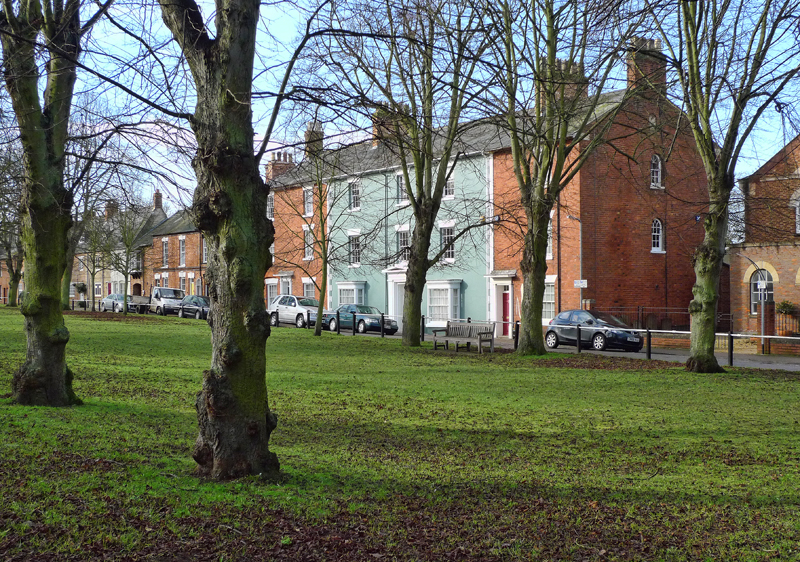
Horsefair Green

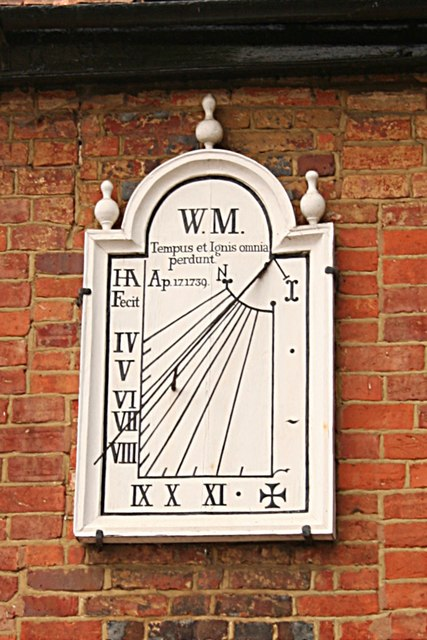
18th-century sundial on the front of 40 Church Street. The Latin motto Tempus et ignis omnia perdunt ("Time and fire lose all") refers to the great fire of 1736.

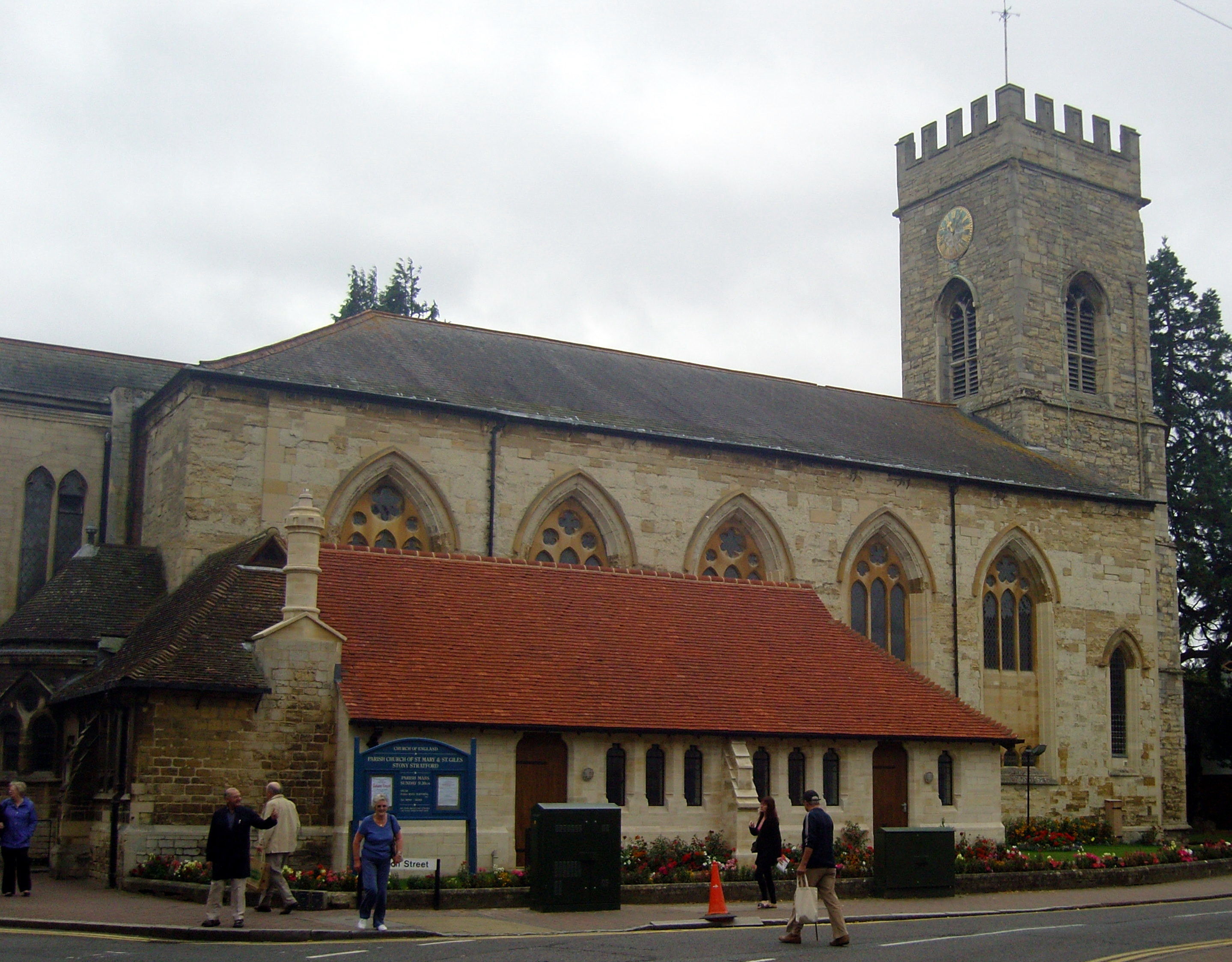
St Mary & St Giles Church, listed at Grade II*..
