= Wolverton Urban District =

Local authority 1920–1974

Coordinates: 52.0866°N 0.7222°W

Wolverton Stratford and Wolverton (1894–1920)
- Rural district (1894–1919); Urban district (1919–1974)
- Area
  - 1911: 4,459 acres (18.0 km^{2})
  - 1931/1961: 4,699 acres (19.0 km^{2})
- Population
  - 1911: 10,427
  - 1931: 12,873
  - 1961: 13,113
- Density
  - 1911: 2.3/acre
  - 1931: 2.7/acre
  - 1961: 2.8/acre
- History
  - Created: 28 December 1894
  - Abolished: 31 March 1974
  - Succeeded by: Milton Keynes
- Contained within
  - County Council: Buckinghamshire

Wolverton Urban District was a local government district in Buckinghamshire, England, from 1920 to 1974, covering the town of Wolverton and its environs, including the town of Stony Stratford.

A district covering this area existed from 1894 to 1974, but was initially a rural district called Stratford and Wolverton Rural District. It was redesignated an urban district in 1919, briefly being called Stratford and Wolverton Urban District before being renamed Wolverton Urban District in 1920.

== History ==
The Stratford and Wolverton Rural District had its origins in the Potterspury Poor Law Union, which had been created in 1835. The poor law union was mostly in Northamptonshire but included four parishes in Buckinghamshire. Poor law unions formed the basis for sanitary districts when they were created in 1872, with the area becoming the Potterspury Rural Sanitary District, administered by the board of guardians for the poor law union, which was based at the Union Workhouse in Yardley Gobion. Under the Local Government Act 1894, rural sanitary districts became rural districts on 28 December 1894, and where sanitary districts straddled county boundaries they were split to create separate rural districts for the parts in each county. The Stratford and Wolverton Rural District was therefore created covering the four Buckinghamshire parishes from the Potterspury Rural Sanitary District.

The council held its first meeting on 3 January 1895 at the workhouse in Yardley Gobion, when George Edward Willes, rector of Calverton, was appointed the first chairman. From February 1895 the council met in Stony Stratford.

On 1 April 1919 a new parish of New Bradwell was added to the district, having been created from part of the parish of Bradwell in the Newport Pagnell Rural District. On the same day the Stratford and Wolverton Rural District was made an urban district. The five parishes then covered by the urban district therefore became urban parishes and so ceased to have separate parish councils and parish meetings, with the district council taking on the parish-level functions. The Stratford and Wolverton Urban District Council held its first meeting on 17 April 1919, at which meeting it resolved to request a change of name to Wolverton Urban District Council. The change of name took effect on 12 February 1920.

In 1927, the parishes of Calverton, Stony Stratford East and Stony Stratford West were abolished and the Wolverton parish was extended to cover these areas. New Bradwell was abolished as part of a county review order in 1934 and the area of the urban district and civil parish of Wolverton became coterminous.

In 1967 the new town of Milton Keynes was designated, with the Wolverton Urban District falling within the designated area. The Milton Keynes Development Corporation was established to oversee construction of the new town, and Wolverton Urban District Council lost its town planning responsibilities to the development corporation.

Following the Local Government Act 1972, Wolverton Urban District was abolished in 1974, when the area became part of the Borough of Milton Keynes. Initially, no successor parish was created, and so the former district was governed directly by Milton Keynes Borough Council. Parishes were re-established for the area in 2001.

== Parishes ==
The district initially consisted of the following civil parishes:

- Calverton
- Stony Stratford East
- Stony Stratford West
- Wolverton

with New Bradwell being added later, as noted above.

== Premises ==
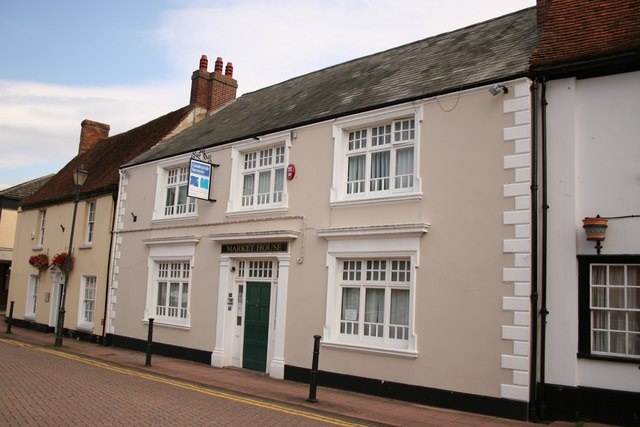
8 Market Square, Stony Stratford: Council offices 1949-1974

Prior to 1919, the rural district council generally met at St Mary's Parish Hall on London Road in Stony Stratford. On becoming an urban district in 1919, the meeting place was moved to the Wolverton Science and Art Institute on Church Street in Wolverton, before transferring to a room at the McCorquodale Printing Works in 1944. During this time the council's offices were accommodated in various premises around the district. A converted house at 122 Church Street in Wolverton served as the council's offices from 1932 to 1949, but did not have a room large enough for council meetings. In 1949 the council acquired the former White Hart public house at 8 Market Square in the centre of Stony Stratford, which had been most recently used as a working men's club. The building was converted to become the council's offices and meeting place, and was formally opened on 12 March 1949. The council then remained based at 8 Market Square until its abolition in 1974.

== See also ==
- Wolverton and Greenleys - the modern civil parish for Wolverton and the modern developments to its south.
