= Engineering brick =

Type of brick

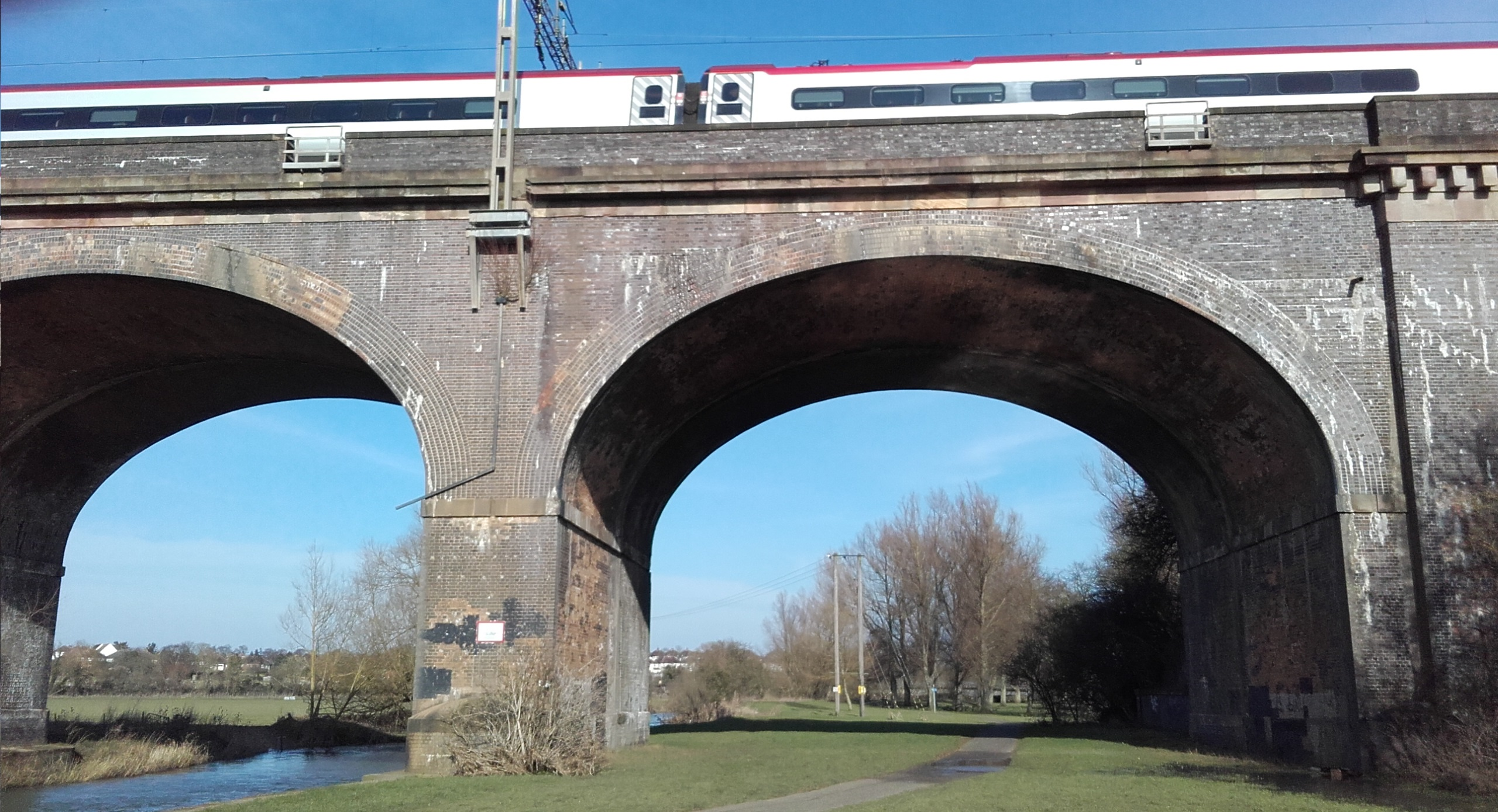
Wolverton Viaduct on the West Coast Main Line

Engineering bricks are a type of brick used where strength, low water porosity or acid (flue gas) resistance are needed. Engineering bricks can be used for damp-proof courses.

Clay engineering bricks are defined in § 6.4.51 of British Standard BS ISO 6707-1;2014 (buildings & civil engineering works - vocabulary - general terms) as "fire-clay brick that has a dense and strong semi-vitreous body and which conforms to defined limits for water absorption and compressive strength".

Stronger and less porous engineering bricks (UK Class A) are usually blue due to the higher firing temperature whilst class B bricks are usually red. Class A bricks have a strength of 125 N/mm^{2} (18,100 lb_{f}/sq in) and water absorption of less than 4.5%; Class B bricks have a strength greater than 75 N/mm^{2} (10,900 lb_{f}/sq in) and water absorption of less than 7%.

Accrington brick is a type of engineering brick that was used in the construction of the foundations in the Empire State Building in New York City.

== See also ==
- Staffordshire blue brick
