= Milton Keynes Museum =

Museum in Milton Keynes, England

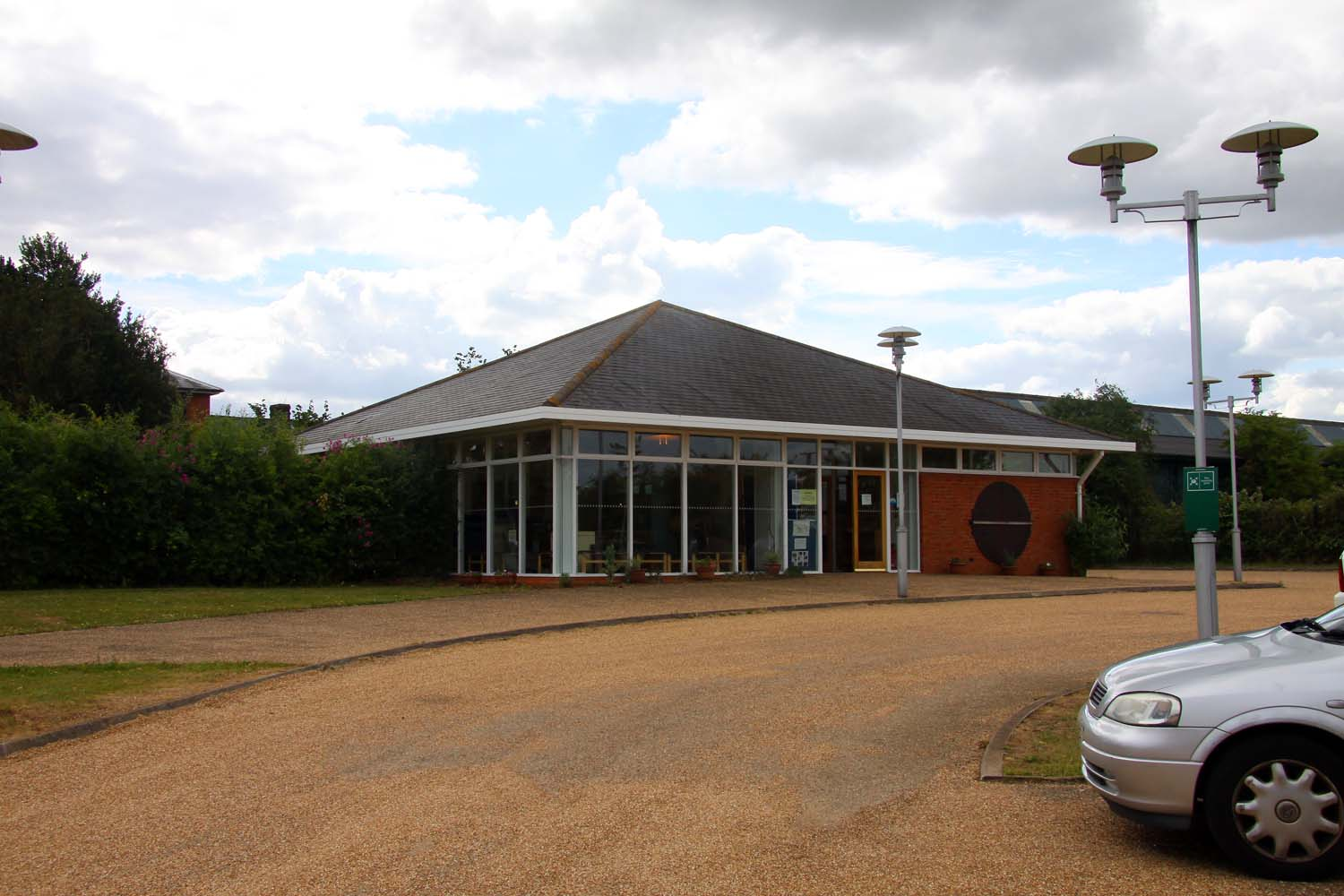
- Museum entrance
- Former name: Stacey Hill Museum
- Established: 1973
- Location: McConnell Dr, Wolverton, Milton Keynes MK12 5EL
- Coordinates: 52.056°N 0.805°W
- Public transit access: Sapphire #6 to Stacey Bushes, then about 0.4 miles (0.6 km) walk
- Parking: onsite
- Website: https://miltonkeynesmuseum.org.uk/

Milton Keynes Museum is an independent local museum in the parish of Wolverton and Greenleys in Milton Keynes, England. It is mostly run by volunteers with a small number of paid staff.

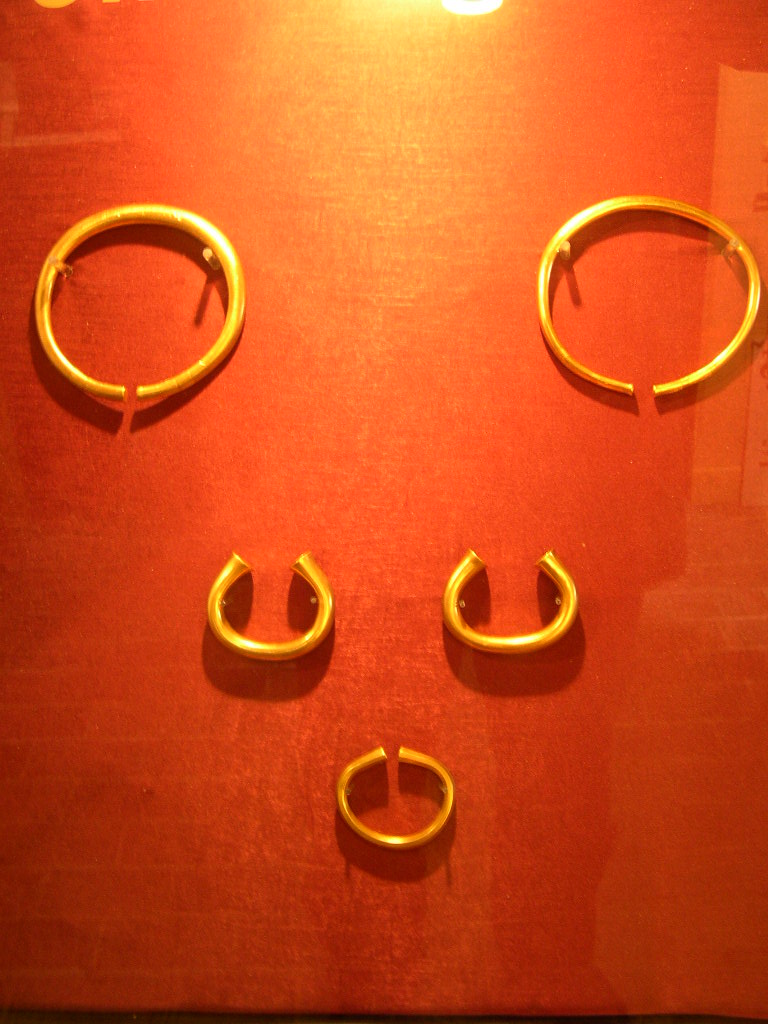
Reproductions of the Milton Keynes Hoard at the Milton Keynes Museum.

The museum is housed in a former Victorian farmstead. It covers the history of the Milton Keynes area, including northern Buckinghamshire and southern Northamptonshire, from the year 1800 onwards. It includes the Stacey Hill Collection of rural life, consisting of agricultural, domestic, industrial, and social objects connected to the area before the 1967 foundation of Milton Keynes.

There is also a collection of many memorabilia of the nearby Wolverton railway works.

The museum's Connected Earth collection includes a variety of historic telephones and switchboards, many still in working order. The museum also has some historic Post Office and British Telecom vehicles. The largest of these is the Road Phone, an enormous working telephone used for promotional purposes.

The museum was previously called the Stacey Hill Museum.

In January 2025 the museum opened a new gallery featuring among other exhibits an ichthyosaur found at Caldecotte Lake In February 2025 the museum had to close due to an electrical fire. No items in the museum collection were damaged by the fire and it re-opened in April the same year.

== Location ==
The museum is on the southern outskirts of Wolverton, just off H2 Miller's Way at McConnell Drive.

== See also ==
- Blue Bridge, Wolverton, the 1830s bridge over the West Coast Main Line, designed by Robert Stephenson to provide continued access to Scacey Hiii Farm's fields on the other side of the new cutting. (This is also the name of the small housing development that is now on those fields.)
- History of Milton Keynes
- Other museums in Milton Keynes
  - Bletchley Park
  - National Museum of Computing
