= Wolverton railway works =

Railway carriage facility in England

Wolverton Railway Works
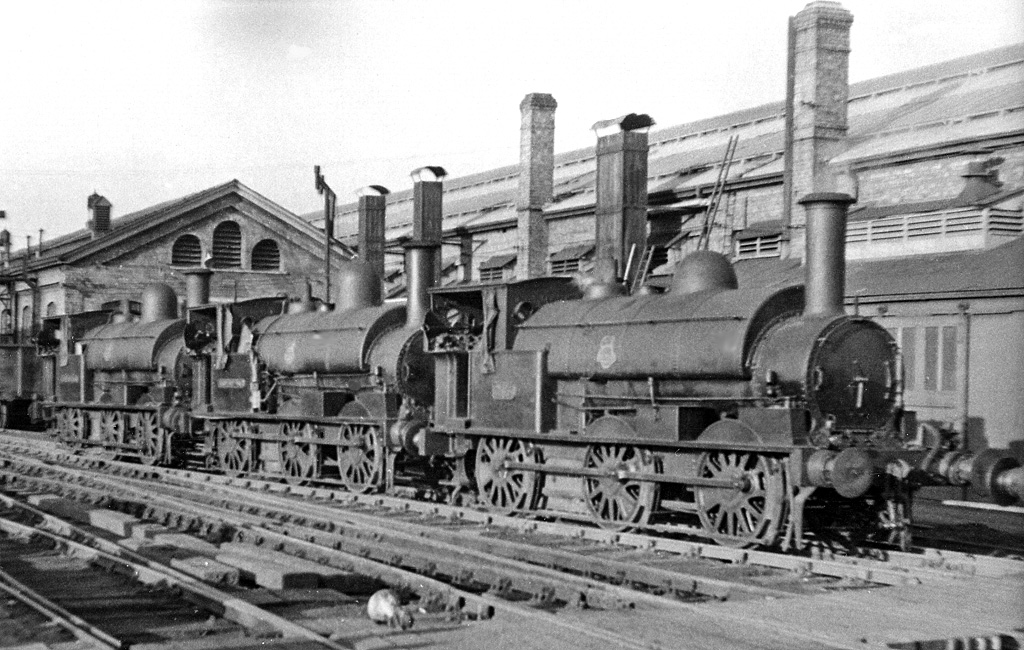
- View northward ca. 1954, outside the Carriage Works. The locomotives are ex-LNWR 'Special' 2F 0-6-0 saddle-tanks, Carriage Dept. Nos. 3, 6 and 7.
- Interactive map of the Wolverton Railway Works area

General information
- Status: In use
- Location: Wolverton, Milton Keynes, England
- Coordinates: 52.063°N 0.816°W
- Construction started: 1836
- Completed: 1838
- Client: London and Birmingham Railway

Design and construction
- Other designers: Edward Bury

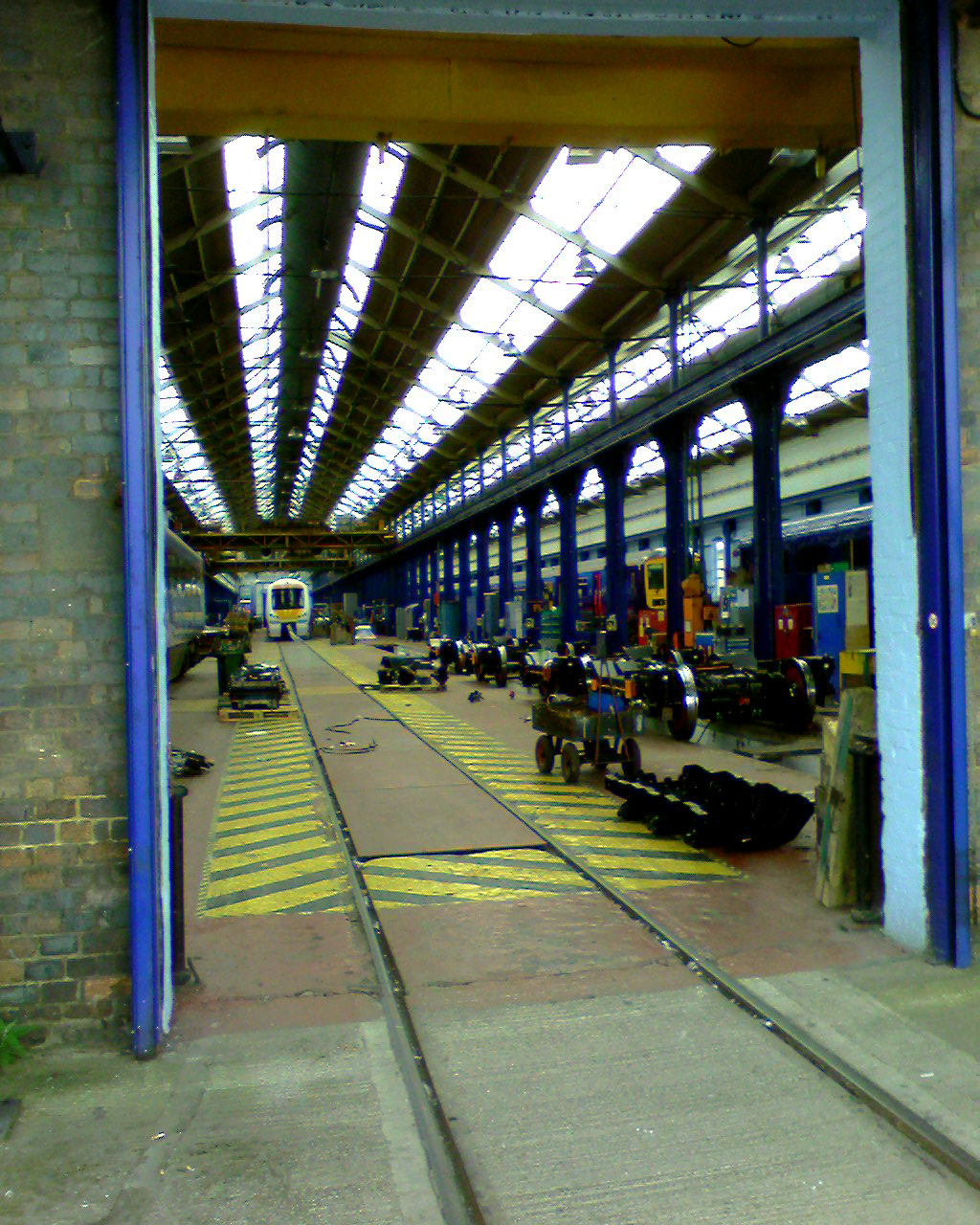
Train workshop, Wolverton works

Wolverton railway works, known locally as Wolverton Works or just The Works, was established in Wolverton, Buckinghamshire, by the London and Birmingham Railway Company in 1838 at the midpoint of the 112-mile-long (180-kilometre) route from London to Birmingham. The line was developed by Robert Stephenson following the great success of the Liverpool and Manchester Railway line.

The Victorian era new towns of Wolverton and New Bradwell were built to house the workers and service the works. The older towns of Stony Stratford and Newport Pagnell grew substantially too, being joined to it by the Wolverton and Stony Stratford Tramway and the Wolverton to Newport Pagnell Line (a branch line), respectively. The trams were also hauled by steam locomotives: the tram cars were certainly the largest ever in the UK and possibly the world.

As of 2025, the facility is much reduced: a train maintenance, repairs and refurbishment works remains in operation at the western end of the site. Almost all of the Stratford Road frontage has been redeveloped as commercial premises (car sales, supermarkets, community centre) and there is a canal-side housing development at the extreme eastern end.

== History ==
=== Foundation ===
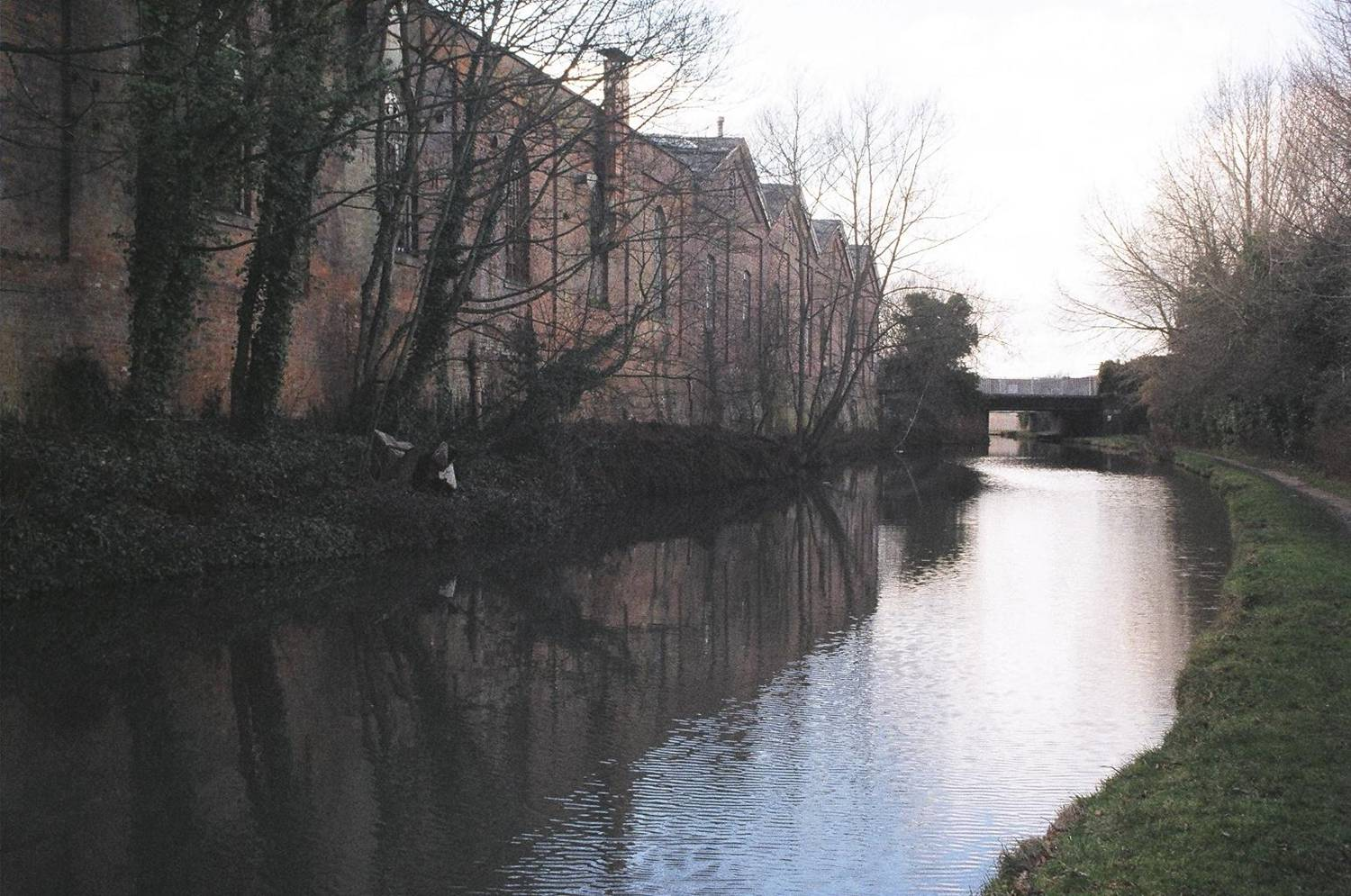
Old Wolverton railway works with Stephenson bridge, adjoins and crosses the Grand Union Canal

The London and Birmingham Railway Act 1833 (3 & 4 Will. 4. c. xxxvi), the act of Parliament approving the London and Birmingham Railway, included a clause that specified that a railway works be built around the mid-point, as it was considered scientifically unsafe at the time for railway locomotives to move more than 50 miles (80 km) without further inspection. After surveying all possible sites, Wolverton was chosen due to its co-location alongside the wharfing facilities of the Grand Union Canal, thereby also enabling the railway company to gain an easy agreement to build a viaduct over the canal company's land at this point.

The actual site was selected in October 1836 by Edward Bury, an engineer and locomotive manufacturer of Liverpool, who had been appointed in May 1836 as contractor for working the company's trains. Under this arrangement, the company would provide locomotives to Bury's specification while he would maintain them in good repair and convey passengers and goods at a rate per person, per ton and per mile, at a speed not exceeding 22.5 mph (36.2 km/h). Seven manufacturers, including Bury's firm, supplied the original stock of engines. Because of the unforeseen demand for increased speed, this contract for working the line was annulled in July 1839; thereafter Bury was employed as the manager of the locomotive department on a salary, with a profits bonus.

=== Locomotive works ===
At first, the works was used for the maintenance and repair of locomotives purchased from outside firms. Two locomotives were built there in 1845 and 1846, and another in 1848, but following enlargement of the buildings and increased facilities, they were turned out in quantity. In total, 166 locomotives were built at Wolverton. These included three varieties of the 2-2-2 LNWR Bloomer Class, 86 of the Wolverton Express Goods 0-6-0 and four varieties of 0-4-2.

In 1846, the London and Birmingham became part of the London and North Western Railway (LNWR); Bury resigned in 1847 and was succeeded by James E. McConnell as locomotive superintendent of the LNWR Southern Division. An innovative engineer who during his tenure experimented with hollow axles, rubber springs, brakes working on the rails, and elaborate boilers and fireboxes, but perhaps his greatest claim to fame is the 2-2-2 Bloomer type of 1851, which was closely based on a Bury design. A total of seventy-four were built in three classes between 1851 and 1862, similar in design and layout but different in dimensions. In 1861 the cost-conscious Richard Moon was appointed Chairman of the LNWR, and became very critical of McConnell; after the Board passed a motion of censure on him, McConnell was obliged to resign in March 1862.

In 1862, Moon drove through a policy that Crewe would become the sole locomotive manufacturing centre for the LNWR, and so the last of the 166 Wolverton-built locomotives left the works in September 1863.

=== Carriage works ===
Having retained its maintenance role, in 1865 Wolverton was designated as the LNWR Carriage Works, eventually becoming the largest carriage works in the UK. Initially Wolverton produced numbers of 27 feet 6 inches (8.38 m) six-wheel carriages on a rigid wheelbase. In 1873, a sleeper service was introduced to Glasgow, and in 1875 to Liverpool and Holyhead. The carriages for these were again three-axle, limited it is said, to 32 feet (9.8 m) by the traverser in the Euston carriage sheds. This remained the pattern for many years, though some used Webb's patent "radial truck".

The 1880s saw the introduction of first-class twin-car sets with an interconnecting gangway. The 1881 sleeping cars for the Irish Mail were of this form, and in 1889 some of the first-class twins were adapted to become the LNWR's first dining cars. In 1883, 44 feet (13 m) sleeping cars were introduced on the Glasgow service, but even though bogies had come into use on other railways, the LNWR preferred to simply add an extra radial truck.

This configuration remained in use until 1893, when Charles Park built a rake of corridor coaches for the expresses to Edinburgh with six-wheeled bogies. This was first and third class only, although second class remained for many other services until 1911. In 1892, the non-automatic brake finally disappeared and in 1896 Stone's patent electric train lighting was introduced, along with communication cords.

=== 20th century ===
In 1901, Wolverton was the first railway works to use electricity for lighting and driving machinery throughout. All coaches for principal services now included corridor connections and were mounted on bogies instead of radial trucks.

During World War I, the works altered carriages to be used as ambulance trains both within the UK and overseas. Part of the works was also turned over for use by the Ministry of Munitions. In 1923 when the LNWR merged into the London, Midland and Scottish Railway (LMS), wagon building was introduced. From 1926, the works was supplied with electricity from Northampton Power Station.

At the outbreak of World War II, as a major manufacturing facility, the works was camouflaged, with the exterior walls still showing signs of green paint. No Luftwaffe bombs landed on Wolverton, although nearby New Bradwell suffered the destruction of some housing and the loss of five lives due to aerial bombing. The works itself ceased all railway-associated work, instead using its vast engineering and wood working to produce Horsa gliders for the D-Day airborne assault. It also repaired Whitley bombers, Hawker Typhoon wings and converted some seven hundred commercial motor vans into armoured vehicles.

It continued its carriage and work construction work after the war, including making large numbers of the all-new British Railways Mark 1 carriage, until the intervention of Richard Beeching. In 1962, the works was downgraded to a repair facility, with the last new vehicle being completed in 1963. By 1964, the workforce had dropped from 4,000 to 2,000, but the works had picked up new work through the repair and maintenance of the British Rail Class 304 electric multiple units. Although no new general service carriages were built, twenty four vehicles were built in 1977 for the Royal Mail, and twenty one diesel multiple units for the Northern Ireland Railways. In February 1986, British Rail Engineering Limited split into two new groups, with Wolverton becoming part of the new BR Maintenance Group, which again reduced staff to 850.

=== Royal train ===
Wolverton has a long history associated with providing carriages for the British Royal Train. The works produced Queen Victoria's 1869 saloon, comprising two six-wheelers joined by the first bellows gangway in Europe; the carriage is now part of the collection of the National Railway Museum, York. Further Royal coaches were built in 1903 for King Edward VII, and in 1961 for Queen Elizabeth II.

The most recent Royal train was fitted out at Wolverton in 1977. It comprised eight prototype British Rail Mark 3 coaches built in 1972 for the High Speed Train, refurbished with two Royal Saloons. The Royal Train is operated and maintained by DB Schenker and stored within the remaining Knorr Bremse service depot. Ownership and management of the Royal Train Service is with Network Rail.

In June 2025, the Palace announced that the train is to be taken out of use by 2027.

=== 21st century ===
The carriage maintenance works consolidated its operations in the western end of the site. In July 2013, the then operators, Railcare, entered administration, with immediate redundancy for many of the 225 workforce. In August 2013, Knorr-Bremse purchased Railcare, including the sites in Glasgow and Wolverton. The company operated as KnorrBremse RailServices (UK) Limited, until 9 November 2018, when the business was bought by Mutares. Wolverton Works is now operated by Gemini Rail Services UK Limited (a division of Mutares), although the site is owned by the St. Modwen Properties plc, a property development group. Although much of the original works site has been redeveloped and further redevelopment is planned for most of the remainder, the western end remains in use for railway carriage maintenance and this use continues.

The eastern end of the original works site has become a canal-side housing development, most as "new build" and some as repurposed historic buildings. The central area is now a Tesco supermarket, a community centre and a Lidl supermarket. The Tesco frontage has been built to resemble the original buildings; the community centre occupies the former bath house and a charity bookshop occupies the former LNWR firestation. Other artefacts of its cultural heritage are held at Milton Keynes Museum.

The site of the former marshalling yards beside the West Coast Main Line is used as an entrepot for white goods, but this is purely a road distribution centre and there are no rail links to the warehouses, although the access line to the rail works is close by.

== Heritage ==
=== Listed structures ===
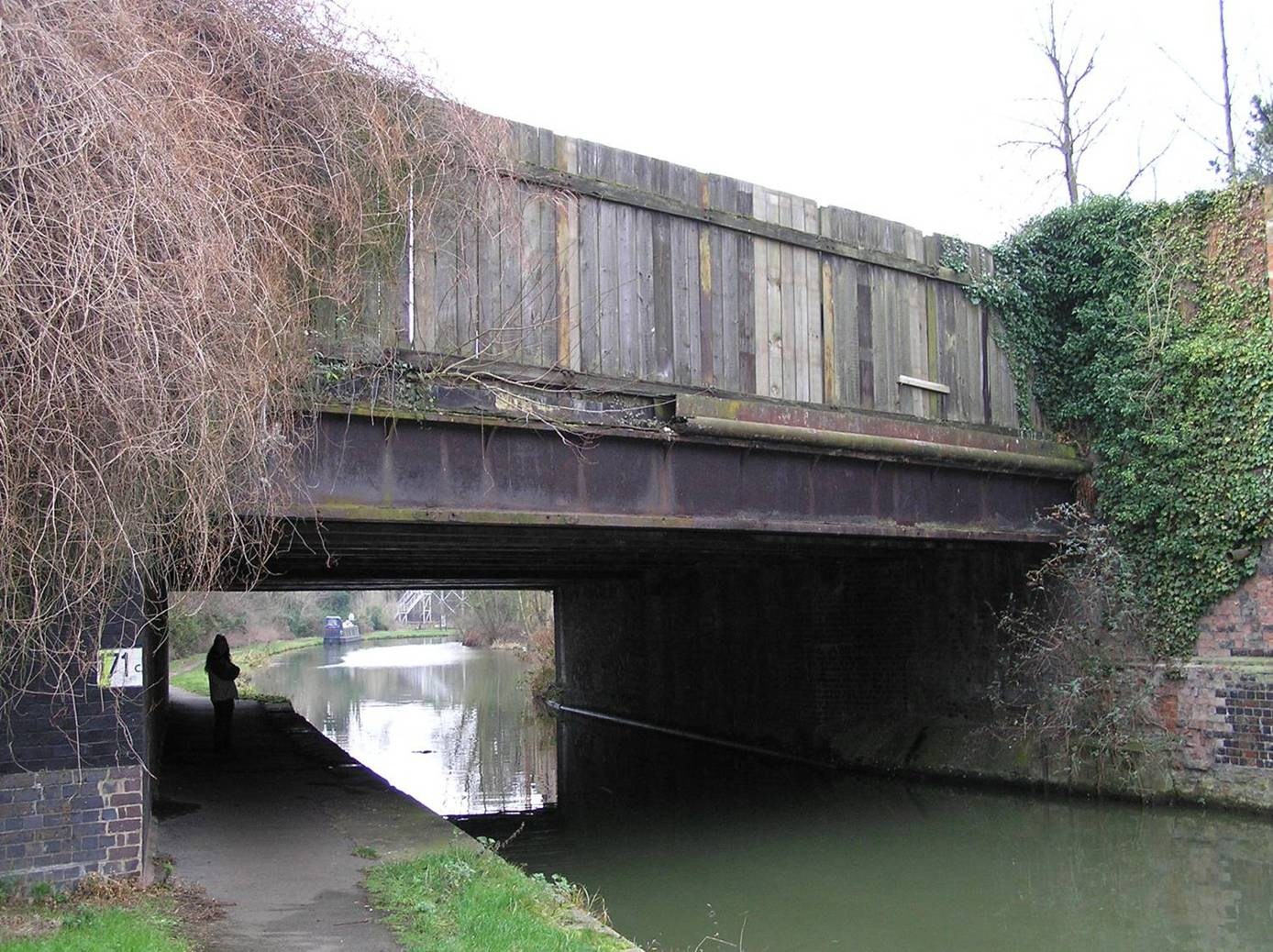
Stephenson bridge made from cast iron girders

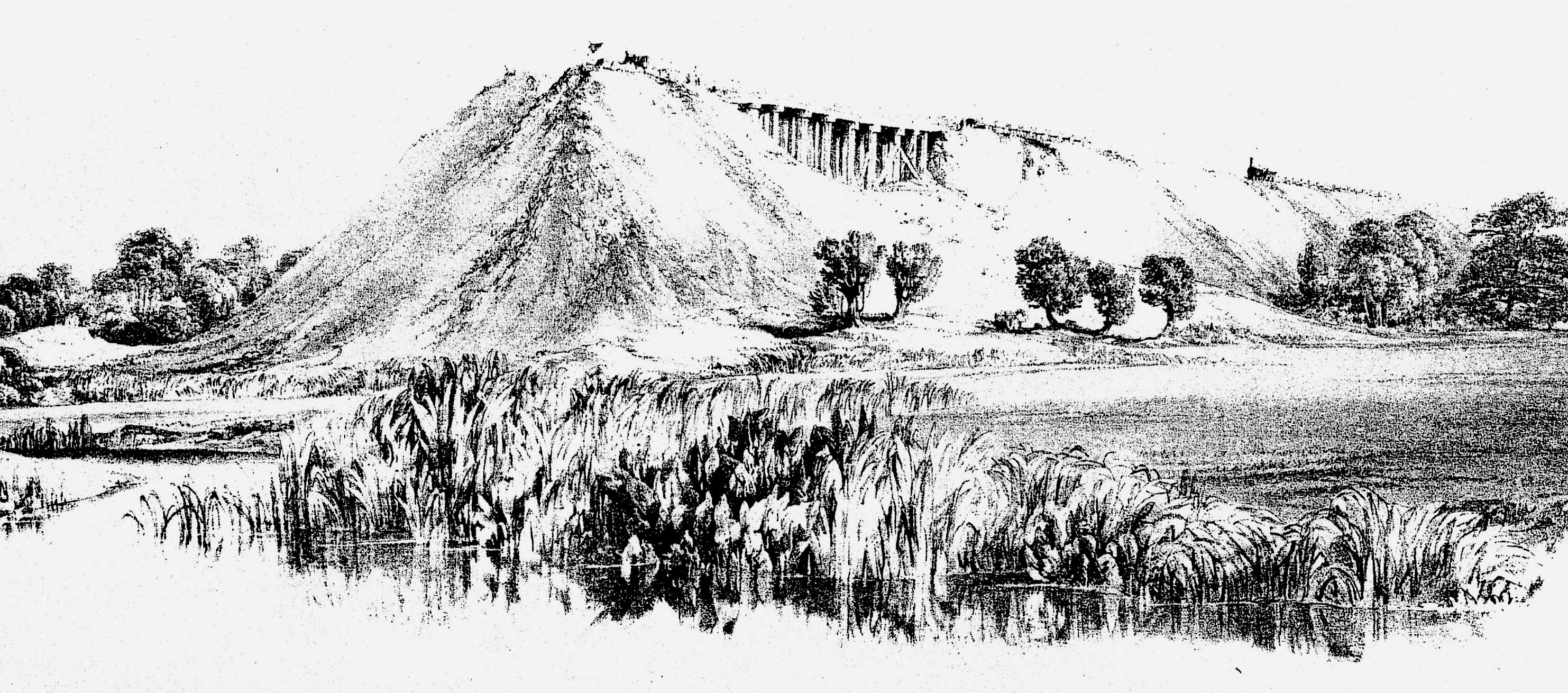
Landslip on Wolverton Viaduct

The original bridge, Bridge no. 171C, across the Grand Union canal was built in 1834-5 (chief engineer, Robert Stephenson) and is a grade II* listed building. The bridge is composed of numerous cast iron girders, many made by the Butterley Company Iron works. It is a rare survival since most similar bridges were removed at the end of the Victorian era. The more imposing Wolverton Viaduct to the north of the old station yard is one of the most impressive viaducts on the line, and was built in 1838 across the River Ouse valley. There were many problems encountered during construction, especially landslips on the adjacent embankment. They can still be seen just south of the viaduct and were portrayed by John Cooke Bourne in his description of the railway published just after it had opened.

== See also ==
- London and Birmingham Railway – Early British railway company (1837–1846)
- Wolverton and Stony Stratford Tramway – Tramway in Buckinghamshire, England
- Wolverton railway station – Railway station in Milton Keynes, England
