= Wolverton =

Town in Milton Keynes, England

Coordinates: 52°03′45″N 0°49′00″W

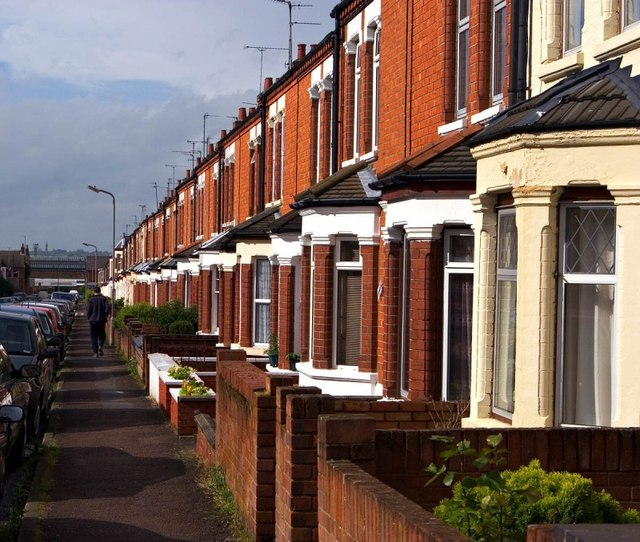
- Anson Road, Wolverton

- Location within Buckinghamshire
- Interactive map of Wolverton
- Population: 12,492 (2011, civil parish)
- OS grid reference: SP816410
- Civil parish: Wolverton and Greenleys
- Unitary authority: Milton Keynes
- Ceremonial county: Buckinghamshire
- Region: South East
- Country: England
- Sovereign state: United Kingdom
- Post town: MILTON KEYNES
- Postcode district: MK12
- Dialling code: 01908
- Police: Thames Valley
- Fire: Buckinghamshire
- Ambulance: South Central
- UK Parliament: Milton Keynes North

Wolverton (/ˈwʊlvərtən/ WUUL-vər-tən) is a constituent town of Milton Keynes, England. It is located in the north-west of the city, beside the West Coast Main Line, the Grand Union Canal and the river Great Ouse. It is the administrative seat of Wolverton and Greenleys civil parish.

It is one of the places in historic Buckinghamshire that went into the foundation of Milton Keynes in 1967.

The village recorded in Domesday is known today as Old Wolverton but, because of peasant clearances in the early 17th century, only field markings remain of the medieval settlement. Modern Wolverton is a new settlement founded in the early 19th century as a railway town, with its centre about 1 km (0.6 mi) to the southeast of the deserted village.

== History ==
=== Old Wolverton ===
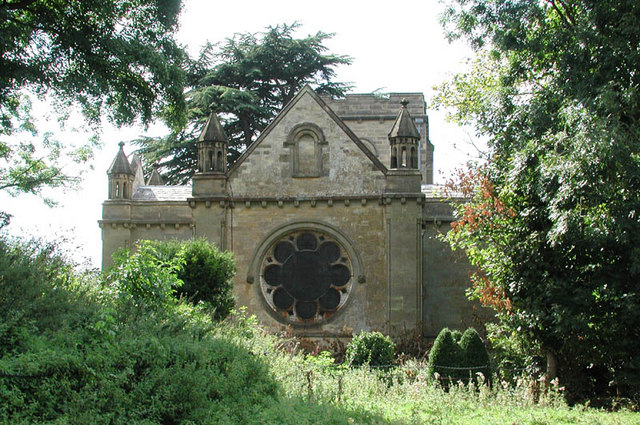
Holy Trinity church

The town name is an Old English language word, and means 'Wulfhere's settlement'. It was recorded in the Domesday Book of 1086 as Wluerintone. The original Wolverton was a medieval settlement just north and west of today's town. This site is now known as Old Wolverton, although the medieval village is all but gone. The ridge and furrow pattern of agriculture can still be seen in the nearby fields. The site of the village, castle and church is a scheduled monument.

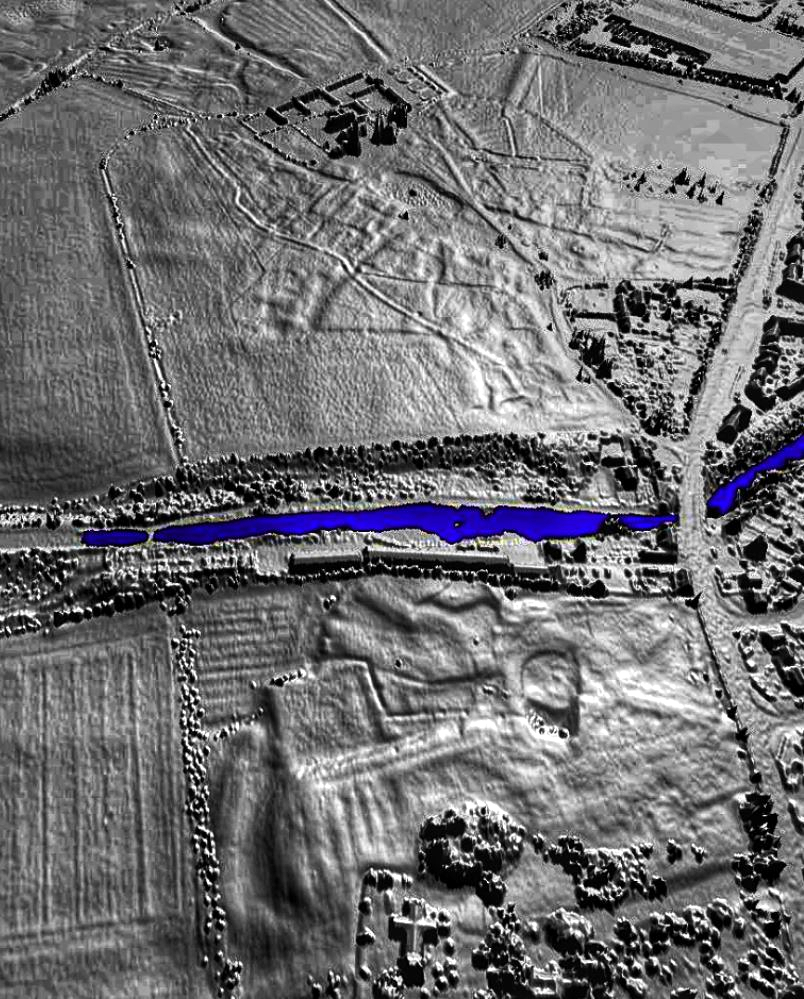
A lidar view of the site of a motte and bailey castle, deserted village and monastic grange at Old Wolverton

The site of an Anglo-Saxon building has been dated to the 400s at Wolverton Mill, with further buildings coming into use in the 600s and early 700s. An Anglo-Saxon cemetery dated to the 600s was discovered in Wolverton and is the largest discovered in Buckinghamshire containing 83 people.

The 12th century Church of the Holy Trinity (rebuilt in 1819) still sits next to the Norman Motte and Bailey site. Only the earth mound remains of the Norman castle, though the Saxon tower still stands as central to the rebuilt church, clad in the early 19th century 'Anglo-Norman' style. Next door to the church is a house built in 1729 which later became the vicarage; the front door has stonework from the nearby, demolished manor house of the 16th century including the de Longueville family coat of arms, and pieces from the earlier church building. A talbot (dog), another symbol of the family, once graced the side entrance which now marks the boundary between the ground floor of the house and its downstairs toilet.

The manor of Wolverton was held by the de Wolverton family until the mid-fourteenth century. Sir John de Wolverton died in 1349 leaving an infant son, Ralph, who died in 1351, and two daughters. The elder daughter Margaret or Margery, married John le Hunt, Lord Chief Justice of Ireland, and had, in turn, one daughter, Joan le Hunt, who married John Longueville of Billing, Northamptonshire. They had at least one son, John, through whom Wolverton passed by inheritance to the Longueville/Longville family.

Of the historic village itself, only field patterns marking a deserted village remain, along with two village ponds. The desertion of Old Wolverton was due to enclosure of the large strip cultivation fields into small "closes" by the local landlords, the Longville family, who turned arable land over to pasture. By 1654, the family had completely enclosed the parish. With the end of the feudal system, the peasants had lost their land and tillage/grazing rights and were forced to find other work or starve. Thus Old Wolverton was reduced from about thirty peasant families in the mid-16th century to almost none, within the space of a century.

The newer area, built about 1 km (5/8 mile) to the southeast for the railways in the 19th century, assumed the Wolverton name.

=== Canal village ===
The Grand Union Canal passes around the northern and eastern edges of the modern town. The canal originally crossed the River Great Ouse by descending 10 metres to the river by nine locks, crossing the river on the level and ascending by eight locks on the other side. This was time-consuming for navigators and subject to disruption in times of flood.

=== Railway town ===
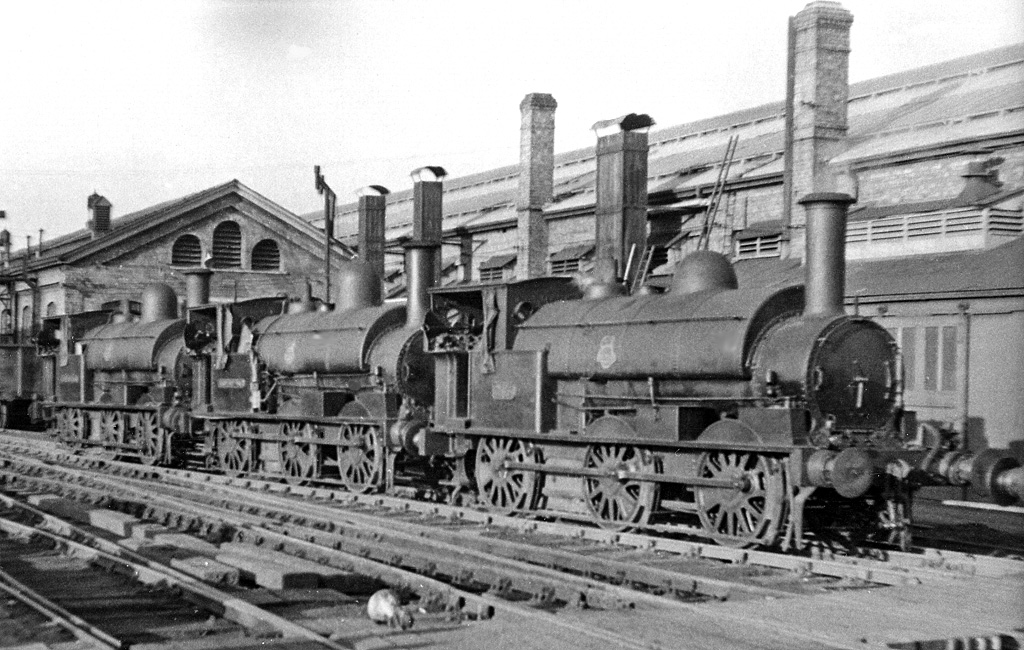
Wolverton carriage works

In 1838, Wolverton was established as the site of the locomotive repair shop at the midpoint of the London and Birmingham Railway then under construction. In 1846 the L & B became part of the London and North Western Railway, who subsequently decided that locomotives would be built and repaired at Crewe. The last locomotives at Wolverton were built in 1863 and repaired until 1877, after which it concentrated on carriages including railway-owned road vehicles. The Works has been the home of the Royal Train fleet. During the Second World War, the Works built parts for Lee–Enfield rifles, bomber plane timber frames, Hawker Typhoon wings, Horsa Gliders, and ambulances. Like many older industrial sites, camouflage paint from the period can still be seen on the factory buildings. A pillbox remains opposite the Works Wall.

The railway company built some 200 houses for its workers by 1844 along with schools, a church and a market. L&NW also invited George McCorquodale to establish what became a substantial printing works in the town.

==== Church of St George the Martyr ====
A new Anglican parish church was built in 1843 to serve the new town centre: like the Church of the Holy Trinity in Old Wolverton, it is a listed building rated a II*.

==== Historic football ground ====
The football ground beside the railway works and the station was home to the works team and subsequently to Wolverton Town football club. The stand, built in 1899, is believed to be the oldest covered football stand in the world. It was set to be demolished by September 2006 because its owners wished to redevelop the site for housing and a community park. The development went ahead and a replica stand now sits on the original site to mark the significance of the original construction, painted green as it used to be.

==== The Wolverton Agora ====
The Agora Centre was built by the Milton Keynes Development Corporation in 1978 to replace the old market hall on Creed Street. The Agora Centre was known for its shops as well as regular roller-disco events throughout the 1980s.

The building was either loved or hated by residents who either viewed the building as a community asset or as a blight on the town that split the town in two (due to the size of the site). The building was often called a "spaceship" and, when redevelopment plans were released, a "farewell" ceremony was held for the building at the 2019 Wolverton Lantern Festival where the "Agoran" aliens (represented by remote-controlled robots) returned to the Agora and shut the shutters for the final time.

The Agora Centre was demolished in 2022 and is due to be replaced with a development that reinstates the original Victorian road structure and plans to include 86 new properties and 8 shops.

Another Agora Centre is currently open for business in Bletchley's high street, Queensway.

=== Listed buildings and structures ===
As of 2021, Wolverton and Greenleys civil parish has two scheduled monuments and two Grade II* listed buildings. There are a further 38 Grade II listed buildings or objects in the parish.

== Green spaces ==
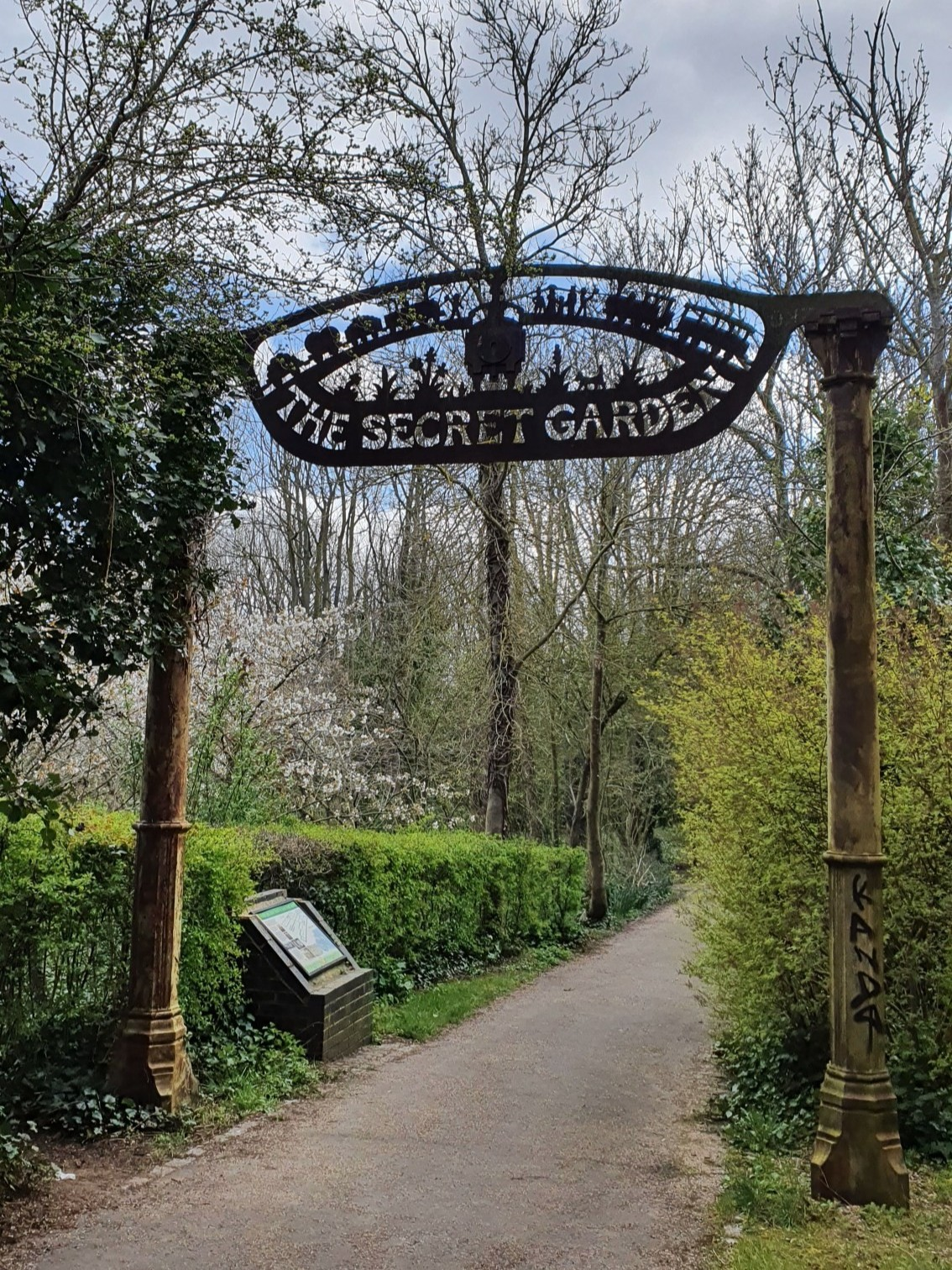
Wolverton Secret Garden

Wolverton was built with a park (Victoria Park) with a cricket ground, an expanse of allotments for the country people who became railway works employees, and access to the footpaths to the north and south. An extensive section of the River Great Ouse flood plain to the north of Wolverton has been excavated for sand and gravel and the resulting area developed into a nature reserve of flood-tolerant trees, called the Flood Plain Forest.

=== Secret Garden ===
In 1999 a group of Wolverton residents clubbed together to persuade Railtrack to sell to the Town Council a piece of derelict land for £1. The council then leased the land to the residents' group for a garden to be created. This piece of land, which sits alongside the Grand Union Canal, has been turned into a small park known locally as the “Secret Garden”, something the residents felt was missing from the largely industrial area. It is maintained by volunteers and hosts outdoor music events in the summer months. It is open to all throughout the year.

Previously the garden was the site of several townhouses built in the early Victorian era for the railways. One of the houses was the residence of the station master for Wolverton. Now the foundations and cellars of two of these houses have been excavated and form a feature in the “Secret Garden”.

== Education ==
The town has a secondary school (the Radcliffe School), two primary schools (Bushfield and Wyvern) and a special school (Slated Row).

== Transport ==
=== Road ===
′Reaching Forward′ (Martin Heron, 2012), at the Grand Union

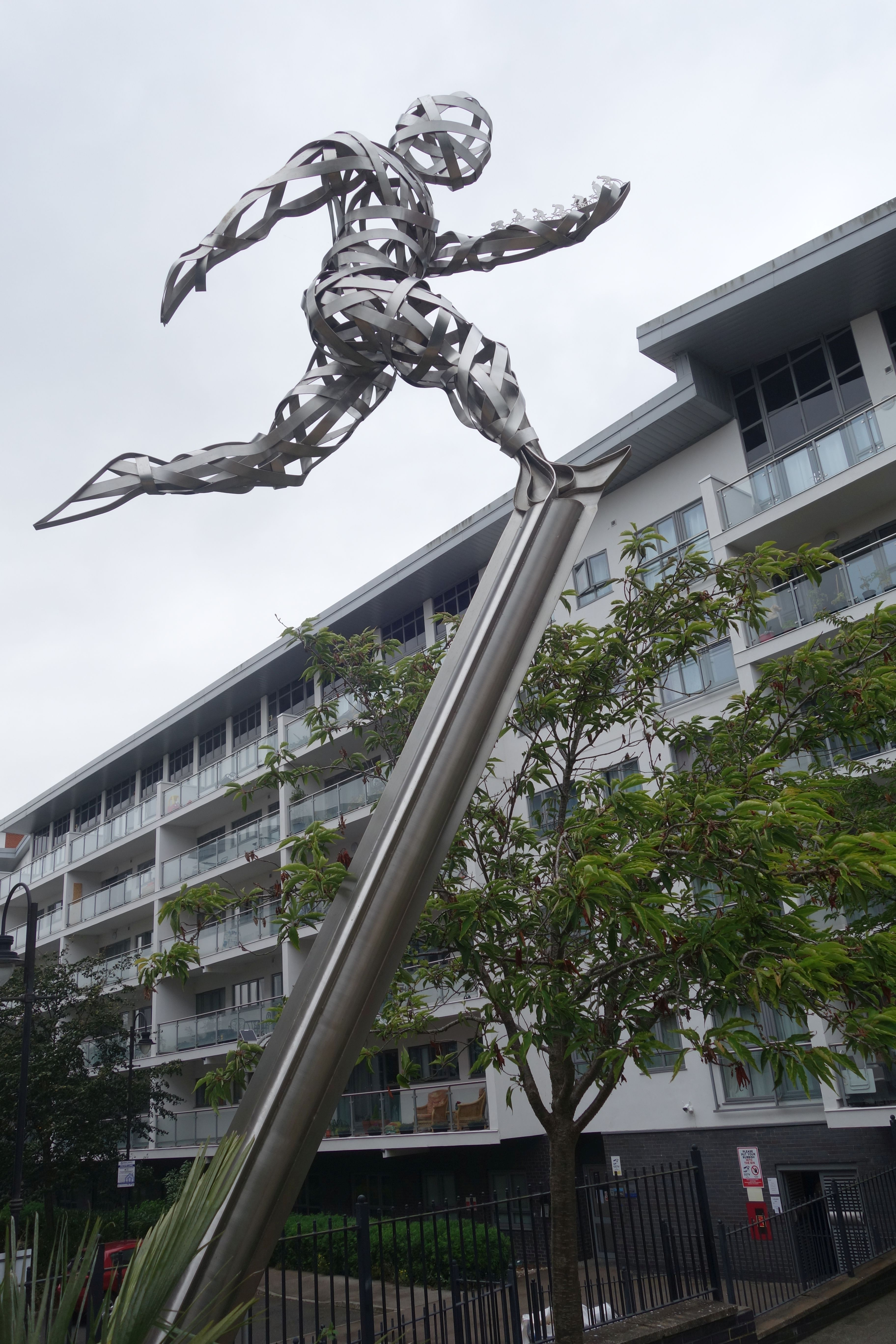

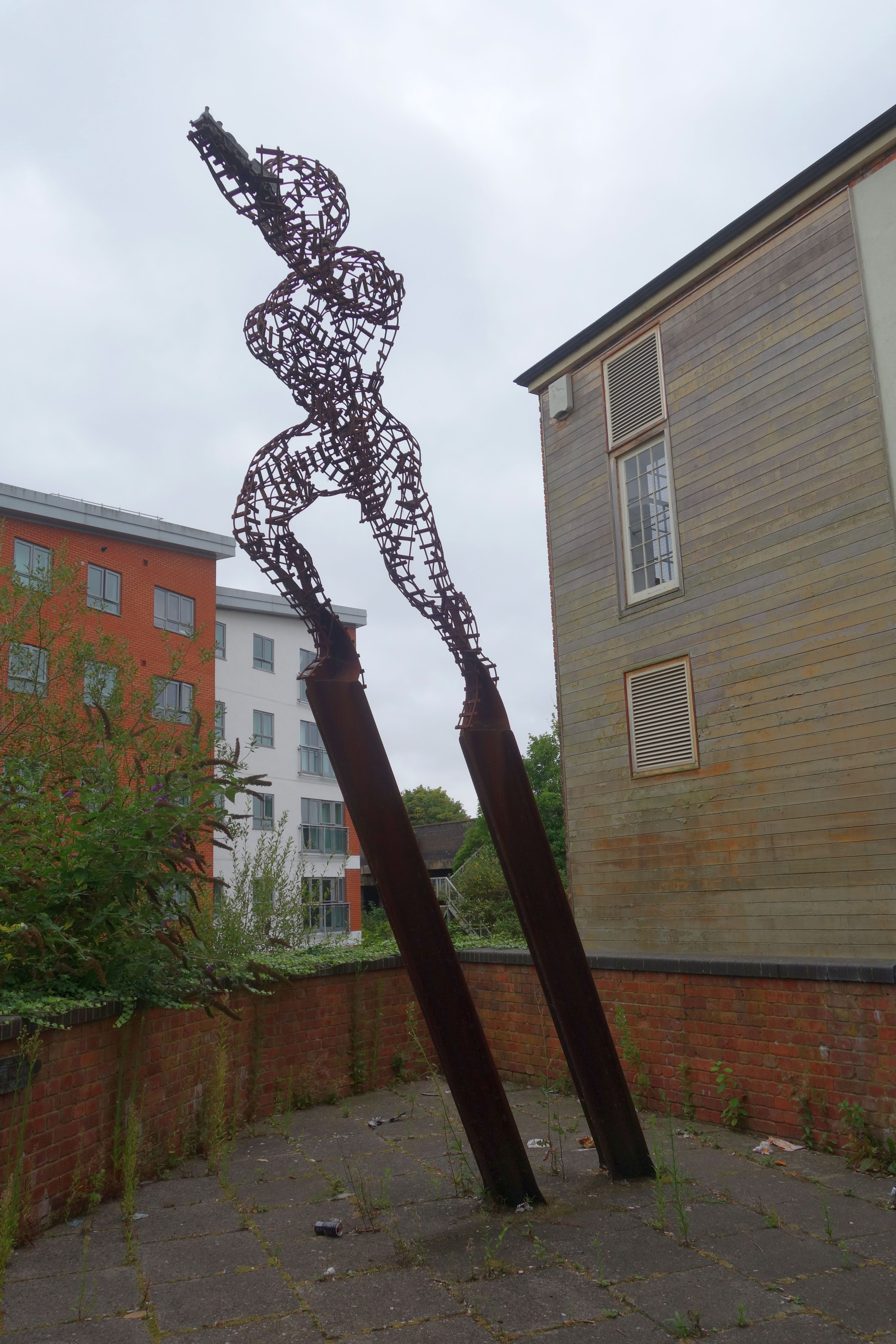

Running through the town (and effectively serving as its high street) is Stratford Road, which runs westwards towards Stony Stratford and eastwards towards Newport Pagnell (and is also known as Newport Road or Wolverton Road on parts of its route). The town is also served by some major grid roads, such as Grafton Street (V6), which runs southwards towards Central Milton Keynes and Bletchley, and Monks Way (H3, A422), which runs eastwards towards Newport Pagnell and Bedford.

For accessing national routes, the A5 (towards Towcester or Dunstable), the A422 westbound (towards Buckingham) and the A508 (towards Northampton) meet about 2 miles (3.2 km) to the west of the town, at a roundabout just north of Old Stratford.

=== Rail ===
The town is home to a railway station on the West Coast Main Line, though only local stopping trains call there. Intercity services stop at Milton Keynes Central, about 3 miles (4.8 km) away.

A "toy town" wooden ticket office that stood on the railway bridge, facing out onto Stratford Road, with steps leading down to the platform was actually the third location for a station in Wolverton. The original temporary stop was on the embankment above Wolverton Park, a larger station and refreshment rooms were soon built at a location behind what is now Glyn Square. In the 1880s the main line was re-routed to the east to allow for expansion and the current station site has been in use since. The wooden station stood here for over 100 years, however Milton Keynes Council did not nominate it to be a listed building and British Rail demolished it in 1991, putting a "temporary" unit on platform one instead.

Since then, passengers must use stairways connecting an overhead open walkway to access the other three platforms of the station, making them inaccessible to passengers with mobility impairments. The Council's 'Regeneration Strategy for Wolverton' aimed to build a new station in the original position on the road bridge over the railway. But the new station was built at the platform level, starting in the summer of 2011 and completed in the summer of 2012.

=== Bus ===
Wolverton is MK's main northern interchange point for cross-city and rural bus services. The town is served by Arriva bus numbers 4, 5, 6, 7, M5 and Stagecoach Group bus number 83.

Arriva's main bus garage is at Colts Holm Road, Old Wolverton.

MK City Council also operates an on demand bus service known as "MK Connect", which serves the whole MK unitary authority area, including Wolverton.

== Civil parish ==
Wolverton formed a civil parish within the Stratford and Wolverton Rural District from 1894 to 1919, which also contained the parishes of Calverton, Stony Stratford East and Stony Stratford West. The parishes had previously been part of the Potterspury Rural Sanitary District until it was disbanded in 1894. In 1919 these parishes, combined with New Bradwell, became part of the 'Stratford and Wolverton Urban District' (renamed the 'Wolverton Urban District' in 1920). This urban district would remain in existence until 1974 when it became part of the then District of Milton Keynes.

In 1961 the parish of Wolverton had a population of 13,113. On 1 April 1974 the parish was abolished and became an unparished area of the Milton Keynes district.

Today, Wolverton is the larger element of the modern parish of Wolverton and Greenleys.

== Sport in Wolverton ==
The town's sports clubs include

- Wolverton Town Cricket Club: the club plays in Divisions 2 and 6 of The Oxford Times Cherwell League and play their home matches at the Cricket Ground on Osborne Street.
- Wolverton Town F.C., an amateur football club
- Wolverton Tennis Club
- Wolverton Town Bowls Club
- Wolverton Park Bowls Club
- Wolverton Pool & Sports Centre – The new centre is on the site of the former 'Wolverton Lido', an open-air pool open during the summer months.

== Twin town ==
- Ploegsteert, Belgium. It was declared a sister city of Wolverton in 2006; this was partly initiated through the finding of letters from a 16-year-old soldier from Wolverton named Albert French. He is buried in Hyde Park Corner (Royal Berks) Cemetery at Comines-Warneton, just outside the village of Ploegsteert.

== See also ==
- Wolverton and Stony Stratford Tramway
- History of Milton Keynes
