= John Cooke Bourne =

British artist, engraver and photographer

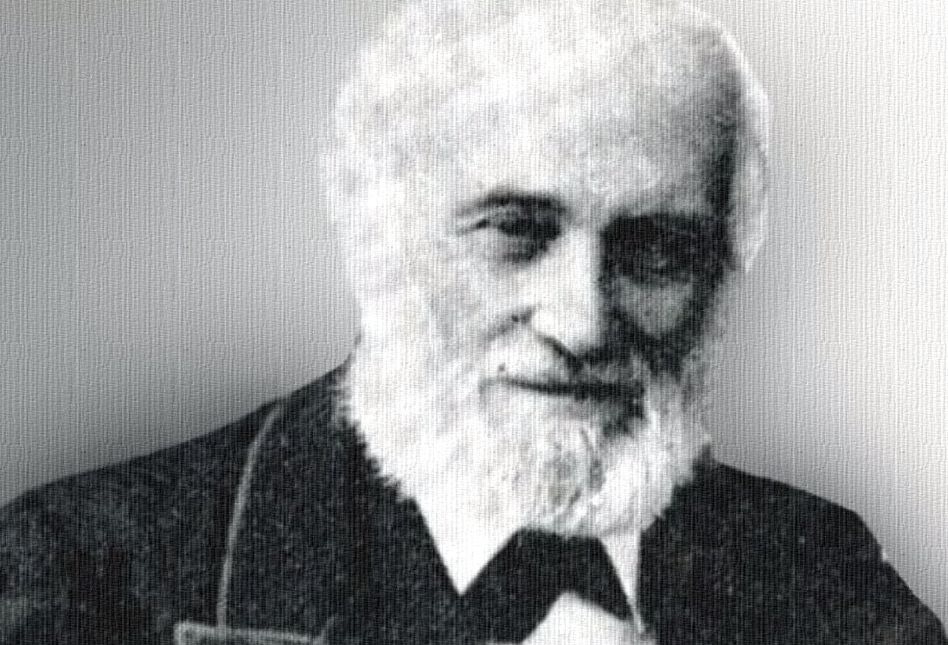
- John Cooke Bourne, late 19th c.
- Born: 1 September 1814; London, England
- Died: 1896 (aged 81); Brentford, England

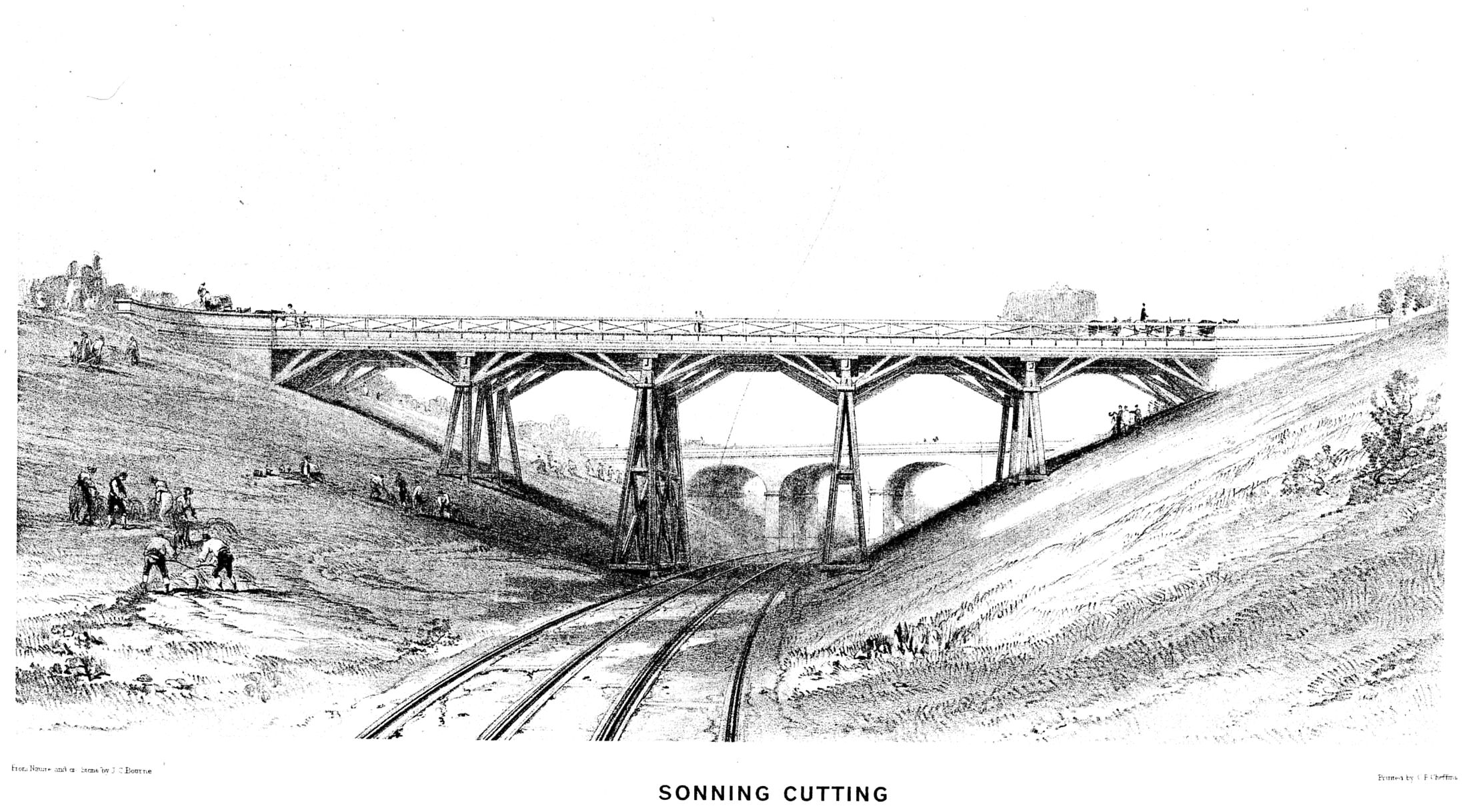
Sonning Cutting, close to the scene of an accident in 1842 caused by a slip in the bank. Workmen are repairing bank-slips on the southern side of the cutting at left. Print by JC Bourne published in 1846.

John Cooke Bourne (1 September 1814 – February 1896) was a British artist, engraver and photographer, best known for his lithographs showing the construction of the London and Birmingham Railway and the Great Western Railway.

His sets of prints were each published as separate book and became classic representations of the construction of the early railways. Copies were often hand coloured for a vivid picture of events.

== Biography ==
John Cooke Bourne was born in London, where his father worked as hat-maker in Covent Garden. He was related to the engraver George Cooke, who was his godfather, and became befriended with his son Edward William Cooke, whose uncle, William Bernard Cooke (1778–1855), was also a line engraver of note. After general education, Bourne became a pupil of the landscape engraver John Pye, who had specialised in illustrations for popular annuals and pocket-books. Bourne was further influenced by the work of Thomas Girtin and John Sell Cotman.

When in the early 1830s near his home the construction started for the London and Birmingham Railway, the first main-line railway to enter London, this became Bourne's major source of inspiration. In 1836 Bourne started making drawings of the construction sides as subjects of professional study. These drawings were published in 1838/39 in a book in four volumes, with an accompanying text by John Britton. Late 1840 he lithographed some drawings for Robert Hay's publication, entitled Illustration of Cairo. Bourne continued to draw railway scenes, and in the 1840s became associate with Charles Cheffins In 1846

Cheffins commissioned Bourne to produce a series of drawings about the Great Western Railway, which connected London with the southwest and west of England and much of Wales. This led to the 1846 publication of History of the Great Western Railway. Bourne also drew the illustrations for Bennet Woodcroft's A sketch of the origin and progress of steam navigation from authentic documents. with were lithographed by Cheffins.

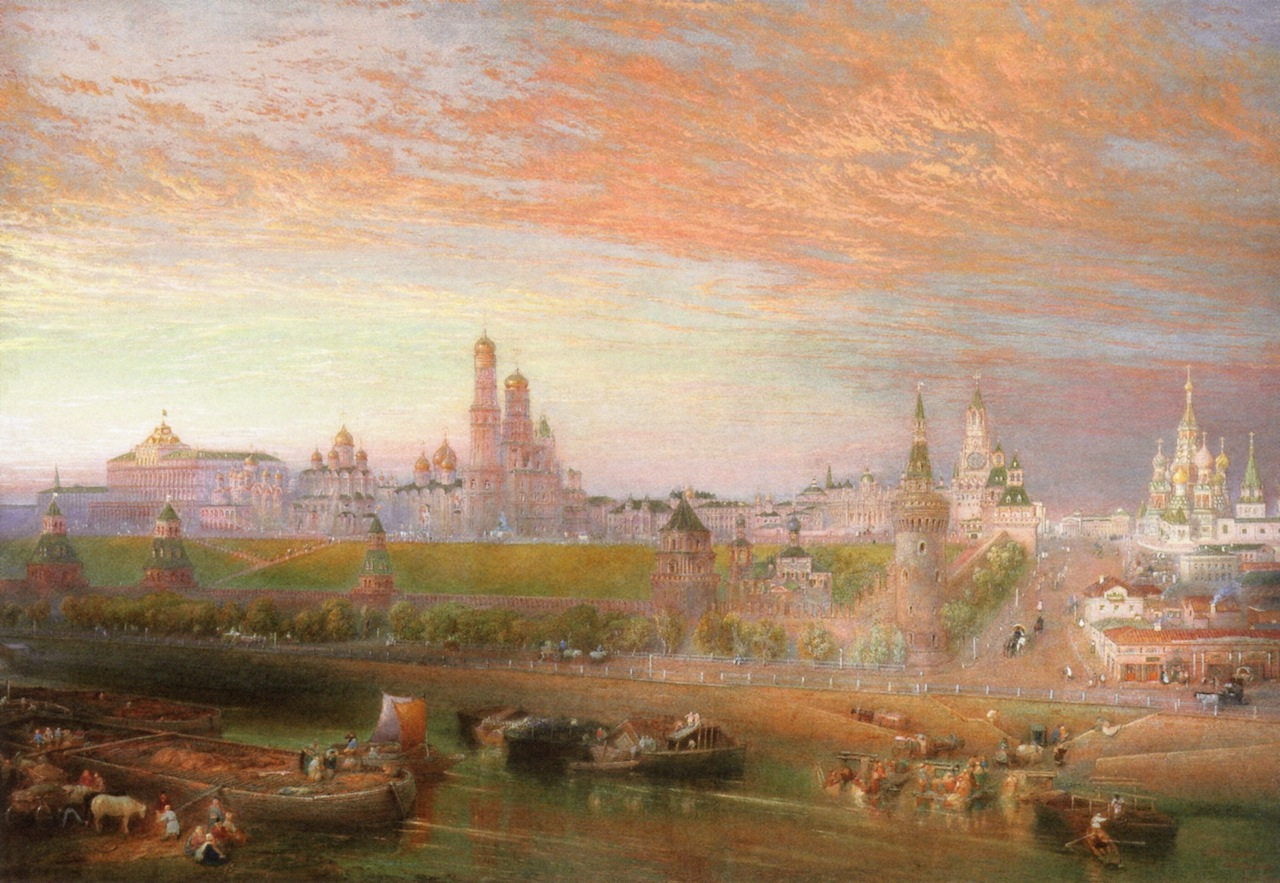
The Kremlin, Moscow by J.C. Bourne

At the end of the 1840s, Bourne started working for Charles Blacker Vignoles, who was employed to construct the Nicholas Chain Bridge in Kiev over the Dnieper River. He travelled to Russia, drew and later photographed its construction until its completion in 1853. In that year, he made some pictures for the new 4th edition of Bennet Woodcroft's A Sketch of the Origin and Progress of Steam Navigation.

Bourne kept working in Russia as artist in residence for another decade. In the year 1852 he travelled together with Roger Fenton to Moscow and St Petersburg, which resulted in his painting of the Moscow Kremlin (see image). He stayed in Russia in total for a period of twelve years as illustrator and photographer, before returning to England.

Bourne exhibited his work in the Royal Photographic Society in 1854, the Royal Academy of Arts in 1863 and the Royal Society of British Artists in 1865. Back in England in 1866, he married Catherine Cripps, and settled in Teddington. He died in 1896 at Brentford, a town in West London.

== Work ==
Bourne's major works were his drawings of the construction of the London and Birmingham Railway and of the operations of the Great Western Railway, published in 1838-1839 and 1846, respectively. Following these projects, he worked in Russian for over a decade.

=== A Series of Lithographic Drawings on the London and Birmingham Railway, 1838 ===
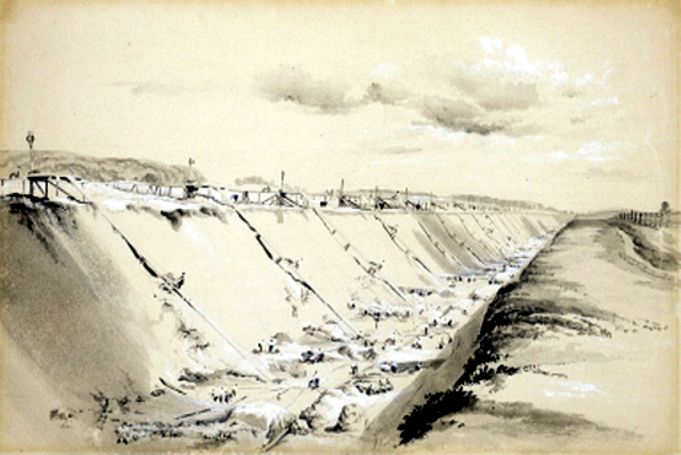
Original watercolour of the railway construction at Tring, 1837

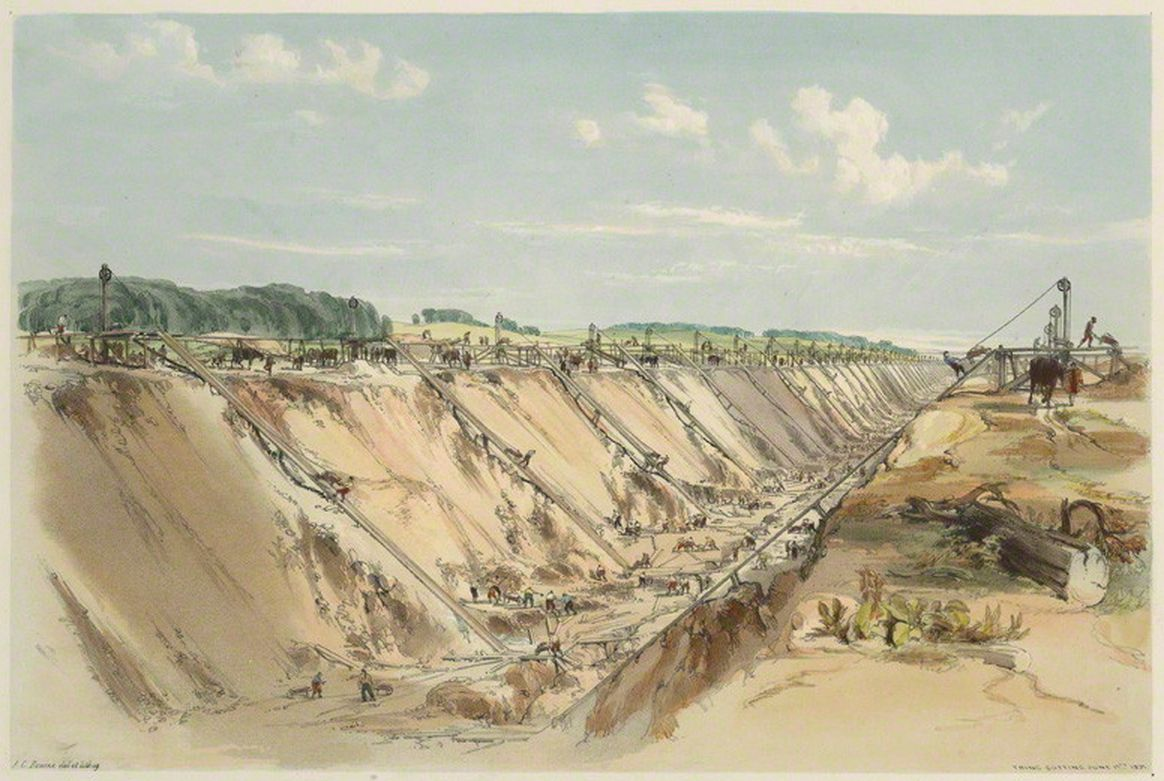
Lithograph coloured by hand, 1838

Bourne's 1838 publications A Series of Lithographic Drawings on the London and Birmingham Railway, showed the construction of the railway from London to Birmingham in the year 1837–38. For this work Bourne had translated his original watercolours into lithographs. It was accompanied by a text, entitled Topographical and descriptive Accounts of the Origin, Progress, and general Execution of that great national Work, written by John Britton. Britton was known in his days from the publication "The architectural antiquities of Great Britain", which had appeared in multiple volumes since 1807. Britton (1838; p. 14) wrote about Bourne's work:

It represent, not only some of the most striking scenery upon the line, but the peculiar manual and mechanical operations connected with the execution of the principal works. Amongst them the process of tunnelling, the formation of embankments and cuttings, the gear and machinery used in sinking shafts, and the subterraneous works of the stationary engine-house at Camden Town, are at once remarkable and interesting.

About the origin of this work Britton in his 1849 autobiography would recalled, that "some beautiful drawings of this Railway were made in the year 1838, by Mr. John C. Bourne, as studies from nature. They were submitted to Mr. Britton, who suggested the expediency of their being published. The great cuttings, embankments, and tunnels, on the London and Birmingham Railway, were, at the time referred to, matters of great novelty and absorbing interest to the inhabitants of the metropolis; and it appeared therefore certain that the beauty of Mr. Bourne's drawings, and the popularity of the subject, would ensure success in their publication."

Britton (1849) further stated about the used techniques: "On considering the best mode of multiplying the drawings, that of tinted lithography was adopted, as best calculated to preserve the spirit and character of the originals, without reducing them in size. Although Mr. Bourne had not previously made any drawings on stone, he was eminently successful even in his first efforts; and the whole of the series (thirty-seven in number) were thus executed by himself. The prints were published in four periodical parts, at one guinea each (super-royal folio). On the completion of the work, a general Historical and Descriptive Account of the Railway, occupying twenty-six closely-printed pages, was written by Mr. Britton."

=== 1838 review ===
One of the first reviews of this work in The Architectural Magazine by John Claudius Loudon, described that "the present work will comprise a series of thirty-three, or more, finished sketches, as executed by the artist on the respective spots, and transferred by himself to stone, with scrupulous fidelity. At the conclusion of the work, and with the last number, will be presented to the subscribers a brief Topographical and Descriptive Account of the Origin, Progress, and general Execution of this great national Line of Railway; with Descriptive Notices of the Scenes and Objects delineated in the different drawings."

The lithographs which will be contained in the whole work are the following:

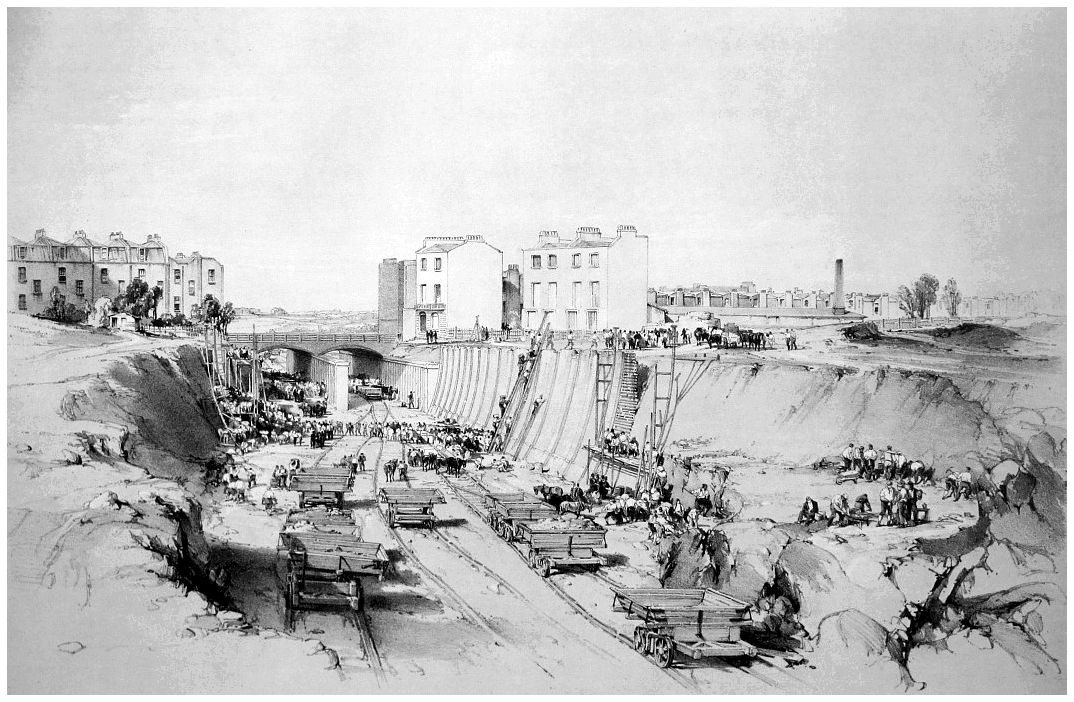
Excavations and Buildings, Park Village.

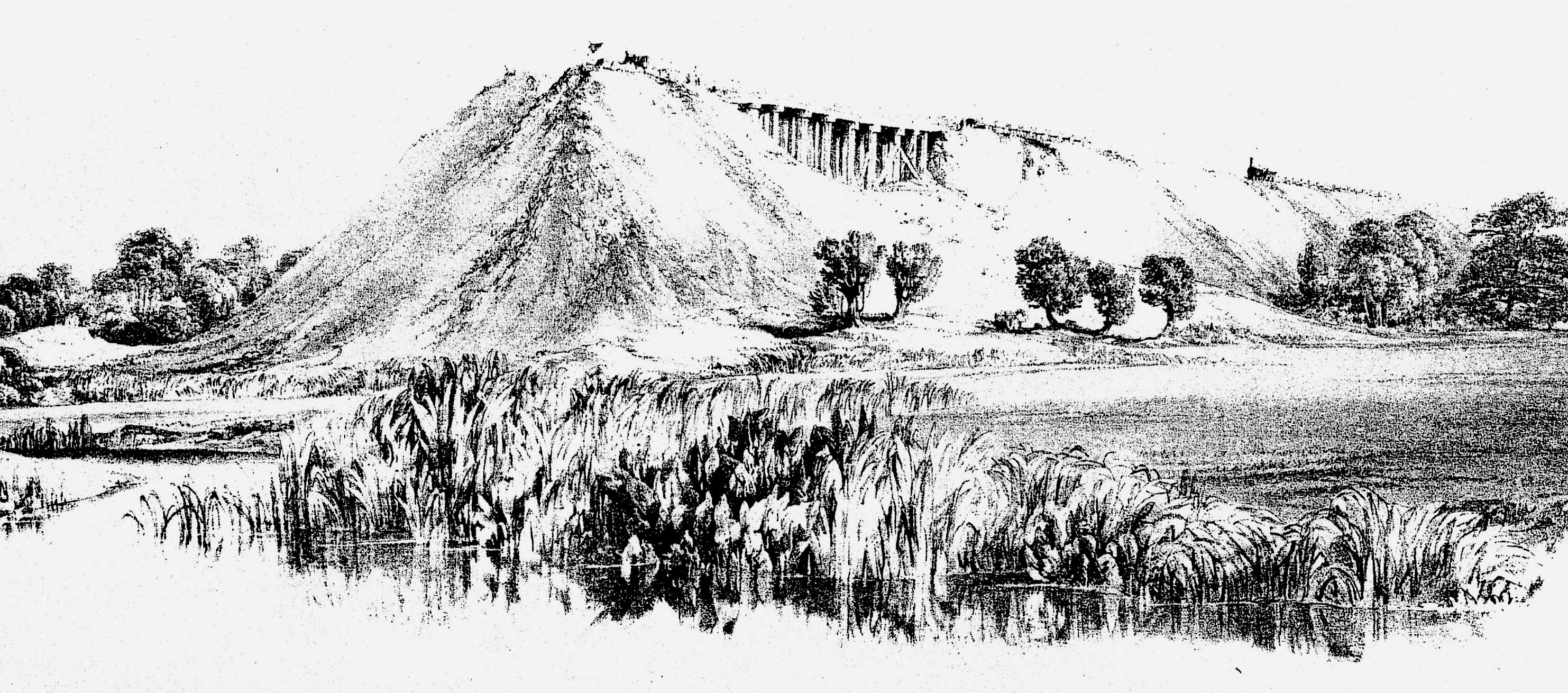
Landslip on Wolverton Viaduct during construction of the London and Birmingham Railway.

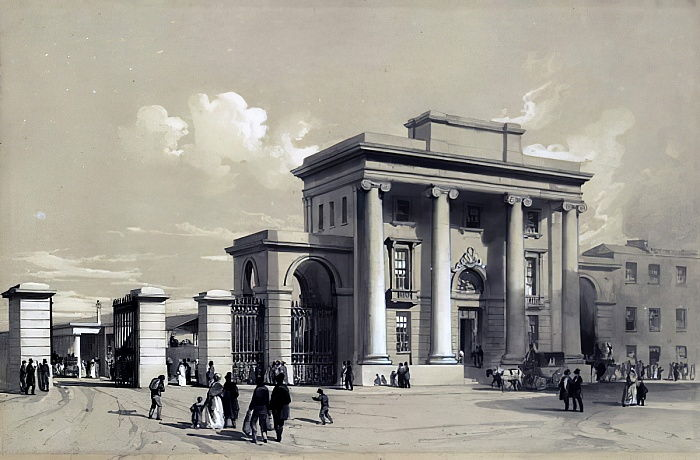
View of the Birmingham Station, 1837

No. ii. London Entrance Gateways, with Offices, &c.
No. iii. View of covered Area adjoining the booking offices.
No. iv. View of Parts of a Bridge under the Hampstead Road, &c.
No. v. View under the Hampstead Road Bridge.
No. vi. Excavations and Buildings, Park Village.
No. vii. Eastern Face of the Bridge over the Regent's Canal at Camden Town.
No. viii. View at the Camden Station, showing the Locomotive Engine House, the Chimney shafts of the Stationary Engine House, &c.
No. ix. View of the southern Entrance to the Tunnel at Primrose Hill.
No. x. View of the curvilinear Embankment, near Watford.
No. xi. The River Colne Viaduct, near Watford.
No. xii. View of South Face of Watford Tunnel.
No. xiii. East Face of Nash Mill Bridge.
No. xiv. Horse Runs, showing the raising of Ballast on the Embankment at Boxmoor.
No. xv. View of the Oblique-arched Bridge at Boxmoor.
No. xvi. Bridge over the Railway for Gravelpath Lane, near Berkhamsted.
No. xvii. Deep Cutting, with Horse Runs, near Tring.
No. xviii. Jackdaw Hill, Linslade, from the South-East.
No. xix. East Face of Denbigh Hall Bridge.
No. xx. View of the Embankment at Wolverton, during its Progress.
No. xxi. View of the Wolverton Viaduct, from the South-West.
No. xxii. and xxiii. showing different Portions of the Blisworth Cutting.
No. xxiv. The Weedon Viaduct, from the East.
No. xxv. and xxvi. Interior of the Kilsby Tunnel, and Entrance to the same.
No. xxvii. Engine and Head Gear for raising Skips in the Shaft to Kilsby Tunnel.
No. xxviii. Pumps at the same Tunnel, with the Engine-Houses, Gins, &c., in the distance.
No. xxix. Brick Fields at the Kilsby Tunnel.
No. xxx. View of the Viaduct over the River Avon.
No. xxxi. View of the Sherbourne Viaduct, near Coventry.
No. xxxii. and xxxiii. Views of the Birmingham Station.

The second part of the work appeared in November 1838, and the two following parts at intervals of two months afterwards.

Loudon (1838) proceed: "Of the artistic merits of the lithographs, we cannot speak in too high terms; and as portraits, having passed along the whole line from London to Birmingham, they appear to us, as far as we could judge in that rapid transit, sufficiently faithful. For both these results, it is a great advantage that the same artist who made the drawings from nature should have also transferred them to stone." Britton (1838) describes in the text:

The drawings were made during the years 1836, 1837, and 1838; and were intended as subjects of professional study, as scenes and compositions replete with picturesque effect and artistic character, rather than with any intention of their publication. As they increased in number, they increased in interest; and, as they have collectively afforded both amusement and information to many amateurs and men of science, by whom they have been examined and applauded, the artist is induced to submit them to the ordeal of public criticism, by which their intrinsic and relative merits will be duly and fairly appreciated. They are intended to show the letter as well as the spirit of railway formation, by representing not only localities and accompaniments on the line of road in its completed form, but embankments, viaducts, tunnels, and bridges, in such various stages of progress as to exhibit their practical formation and construction.

Loudon (1838) concluded that: "It is added, that they are on that account likely to gratify both. the lover of the picturesque and the man of science: the former, by variety of lines and combinations; and the latter, by different modes of application of machinery, mechanism, and manual labour."

=== 1839 reviews ===
A 1939 review in The Civil Engineer and Architect's Journal mentioned the completion of the other two parts. It further stated, that:

"... this is a splendid specimen of railway art, and is a work which does credit to the artist, and communicates an interest to the railway. The two parts now before us complete the work, and are given with the letter-press to the whole; the lithograph drawings are beautifully executed, and are faithful representations. It is in fact a work which to the engineer is a splendid memorial of contemporaneous skill, while by the nobleman and the admirer of the fine arts, it deserves preservation as a unique specimen of art, and illustrative of one of the most striking enterprises of this wonder-working age."

The Herapath's Railway Journal, Vol. 6 (1839) further explains:

"We have received the second part of this beautiful work, and are happy to perceive that it exhibits, if possible, an improvement upon the first. The subjects are equally well-chosen, and delineated with the same fidelity and exquisite effect. Mr. Bourne seems to have adopted the method of all others best calculated for the illustration of his subject, and his drawings may fearlessly challenge a comparison with those of the first landscape painters of the day. The Watford embankment, the viaduct over the Colne, and that at Wolverton, and the two interior views of the Kilsby tunnel (which, with a beautiful map of the line, and four other drawings, constitute the present number), will fully bear out our remarks. The views in the Kilsby tunnel present a most striking and singular effect, which could not have been produced by any other mode of execution, so well as by the new style of lithography. - The drawing of the excavation near Park-street, with its myriads of workmen and implements, is, we think, as excellent an illustration of the vastness of this great commercial speculation, as can be conceived, nor is the scene at all deficient in pictorial effect. Upon the whole, this work seems likely to prove a worthy illustration of the great undertaking to which it is devoted."

=== 1840s review ===
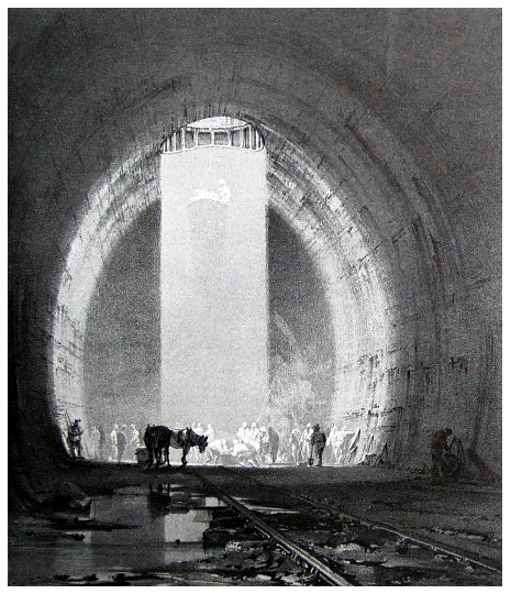
Interior Kilsby Tunnel, 1837

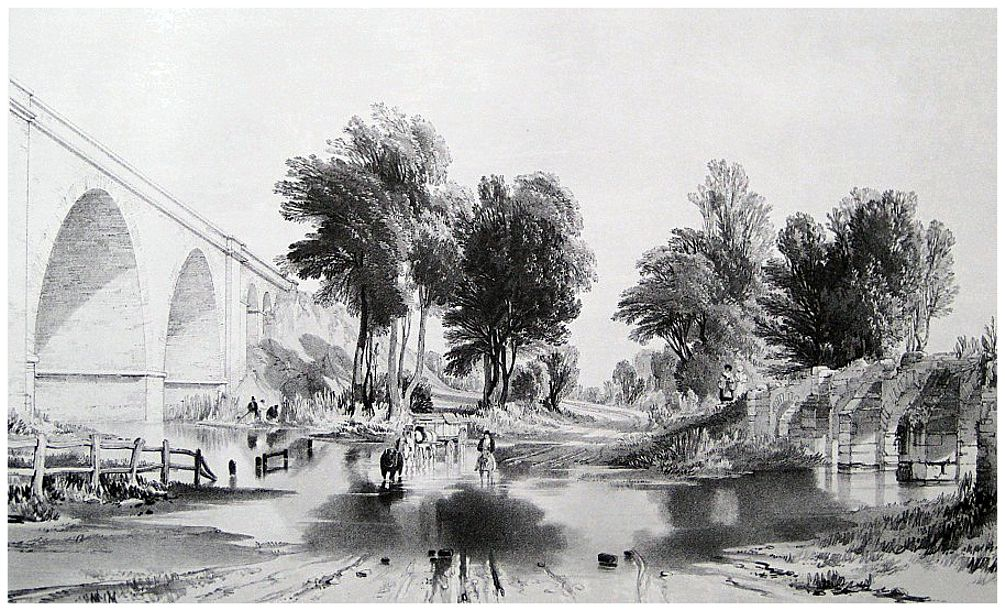
Viaduct over the river Blythe, 1838

An 1840 review in The Gentleman's Magazine describes that the volume contains "a series of thirty-seven views of portions of the line of the Birmingham Railway, from the entrance in Euston Grove to its termination. They are executed in lithography, and tinted; and it is but justice to say, that they do great credit to the pencil of the artist. There is perhaps, no object less picturesque, or to all appearance, more incapable of producing effect, than the dull strait level of a rail-road; but in the hands of Mr. Bourne, the subject seems to have lost much of its untractable character, and by the skilful use of accessories, has turned out to be far more agreeable than at first sight it promised to have been." The various stages of the undertaking are represented from the excavation and embankment, to the complete work. In some of the early views, the scene is varied by the bustle and life displayed by the hundreds of workmen engaged in their different avocations.

Two views of the Kilsby Tunnel are interesting; in the first "a working shaft," the powerful light bursting through the aperture in the roof, and shewing the group of workmen and horses with one of the operators descending, affords a striking idea of the vastness of the Tunnel itself. "the visibleness of the ray of light from the shaft," says Mr. Britton, "is occasioned by the opaqueness and humidity of the atmosphere, arising from the want of the ventilator." In a 2008 article Mike McKiernan commented this same picture:

In the drawing, the excavation of a tunnel is well advanced. A single track runs through the middle (it would eventually have two lines) while the workers (navvies) gather in the mid-distance under a shaft. Two horses, harnessed for haulage, stand patiently nearby. A group of men struggle to move a basket of rubble and above them one worker ascends to the surface with more rubble. In the background, on the right, smoke is rising from a fire while in the right foreground, a worker is sharpening a tool on a grinding wheel. At the time, most of Bourne's fellow artists were concerned with capturing the pastoral idyll of innocent peasants pursuing rural tasks. But Bourne celebrates the navvies' strenuous work in almost a sacred way. He uses light from the shaft to create a spiritual atmosphere, where man ascends heavenward...

According to the 1840 review, another picture "the grand ventilator shaft conveys an equally good idea of the appearance of this vast passage diminishing in the distance into a mere speck. A very picturesque plate of the viaduct over the river Blythe, near the termination of the railway, has the singular merit of displaying on opposite sides of the same view, a comparison between the ancient and modern modes of bridge building. The massive piers, further secured by buttresses and narrow arches of the ancient fort bridge, afford a curious contrast to the great altitude and extensive span with the slender supports of the modern viaduct."

=== Railway problems ===
Clooke had an eye for the problems that the railway companies encountered. Clues can be seen, for example, in his print of Sonning Cutting, where a terrible train accident had occurred in December 1842. The train had collided with a landslip and killed nine stonemasons returning from work in London to the West Country. The picture shows labourers working to clear further slips in the bank.

Another of his famous prints shows a large landslip on the London and Birmingham Railway just north of Wolverton railway works, which occurred during the construction of the Wolverton viaduct over the River Ouse.

=== History of the Great Western Railway, 1846 ===
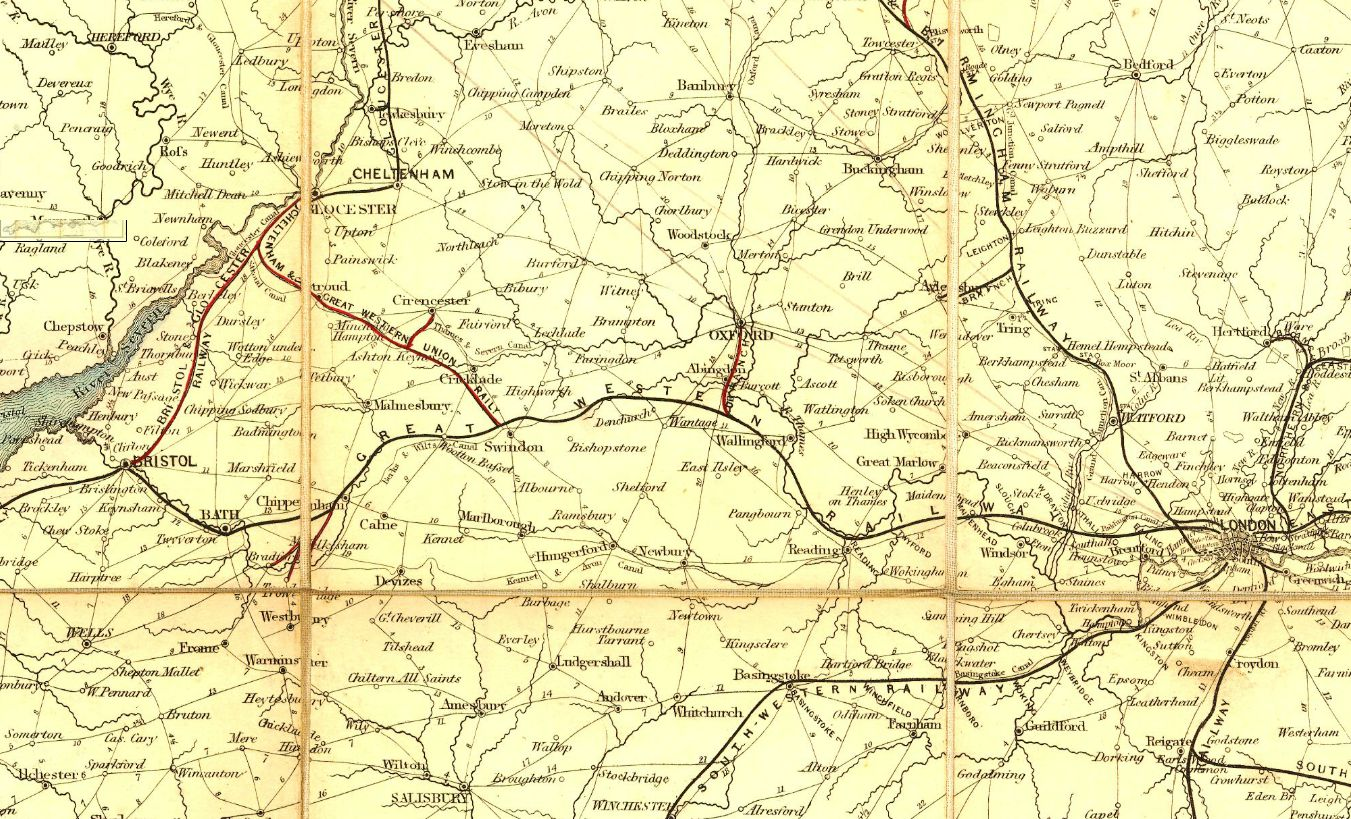
Route of the Great Western Railway on Cheffin's Map, 1850.

In 1846, Bourne published his second book with a series of drawings of the Great Western Railway that linked London with the south-west and west of England and most of Wales. The full title of this work, as advertised in a volume of the 1846 Appleton's Literary Bulletin, was:

The History and Description of the Great Western Railway; including its Geology and the Antiquities of the District through which it passes, accompanied by a Plan and Section of the Railway, a Geological Map, and by numerous Views of its principal Viaducts, Tunnels, Stations, and of the Scenery and Antiquities in its Vicinity, from Drawings taken expressly for this work, and executed in lithography by John C. Bourne. Folio, pp. 76, 34 plates.

The idea for this work came from the publisher and was due to the popularity of this subject. The style of the drawings were significantly different from his 1838 work on the London and Birmingham Railway. It was more impressionistic and composed in "a far more painterly way." Freeman & Aldcroft (1991) stipulated, that in this volume "the emphasis on engineering feats is reduced (presumably because the line was by then some years old), and the focus shifts more to views from the carriage window and the facilities provided by stations: the wonders of construction have given way to the pleasures and conveniences of railway travel."

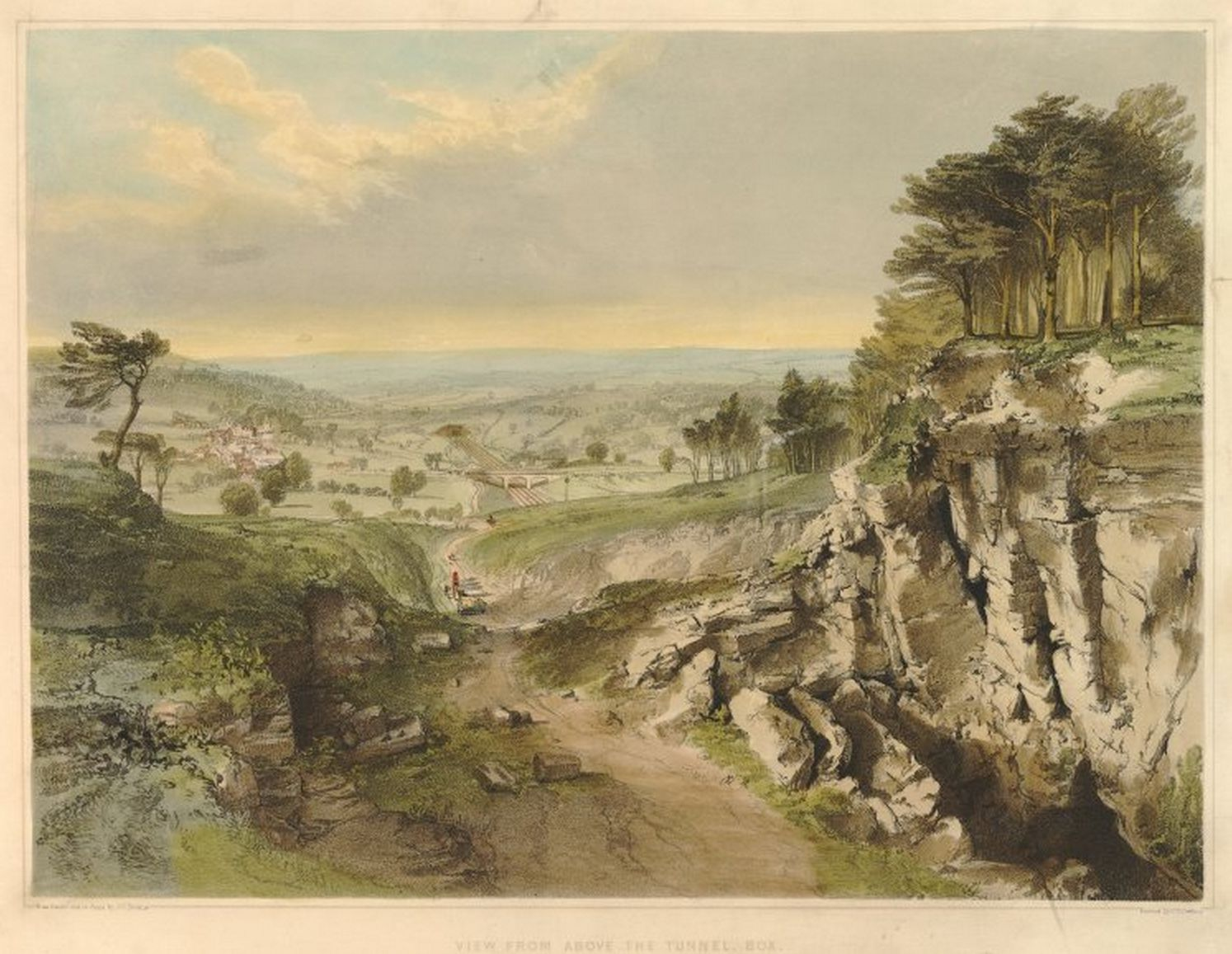
View from above the tunnel box, 1846

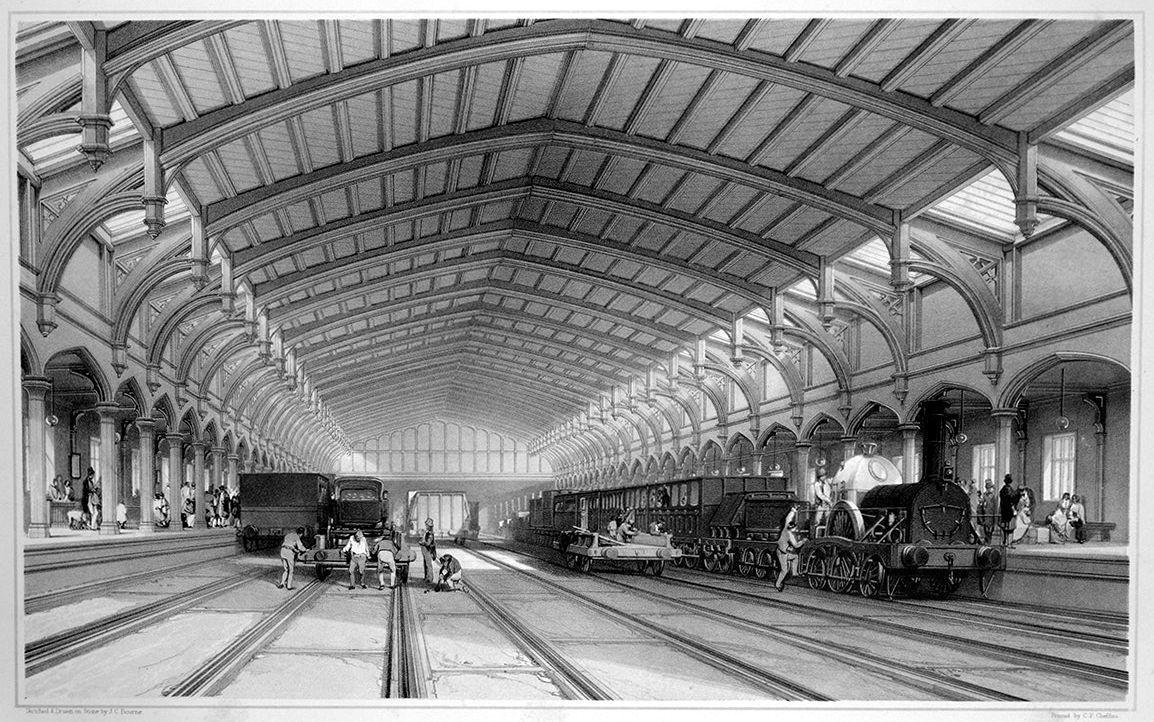
Bristol Temple Meads railway station train-shed engraving, 1846

The accompanied text was written by the engineer George Thomas Clark, and in those days was discussed in multiple sources The volume of Bourne's work was reproduced in 1969.

=== 1846 review ===
An 1846 review in The Gentleman's Magazine on the History of the Great Western Railway starts explaining in general, that "[t]he history and illustration of the great railways of the present day is a fertile theme, and one which cannot fail to excite interest, not merely amongst the individuals immediately connected with them, but with the public generally, and men of science and philosophers particularly. What were only a few years back matters of speculation and mystery are now familiarly recognized by the great mass of the reading public. In the Great Western Line many railway novelties and improvements have been effected, at once astonishing and confusing those who predicted their utter failure. It cannot but be deeply interesting to trace the origin, Uic progress, and effects of this stupendous undertaking, now that it has been for sonic years in successful operation."

Specific about the work the review states that:

This volume furnishes that information, with much other interesting; matter of a collateral nature. Mr. Bourne's lithographic drawings are already favourably known, and it is sufficient to say that he has displayed the same spirit, taste, and accuracy of delineation in this work as in his former subjects. The present views embrace thirty-six different points upon the Great Western, from the Paddington Station and the Hanwell Viaduct, to the Slough and Swindon Stations; and particularly the Great Box Tunnel, also the interesting scenery and works in the vicinity of Bath and Bristol. There are also fourteen architectural drawings as an Appendix, being views and details of the most remarkable ancient churches upon the line of the railway, their fonts, doorways, sepulchral effigies, &c.

And it continues, that "[t]he illustrative department is completed by a map and section of the line, and a geological map of the singular district in which the Great Western Railway terminates, and across which are carried, in opposite direction, its continuations towards Exeter on the one hand, and Gloucester on the other. The letter-press, besides a description of the route of the railway, of those fine architectural works, its viaducts and bridges, which, though daily crossed by thousands, are actually seen by few, and of the topography and geological features of the line, comprises a brief history of the formation of the company, whilst in an introduction the non-professional reader is made acquainted with the principles of railway construction, and the application and regulation of locomotive steam power. Tims it will be seen that every branch of the subject has received attention, and the result is the production of a volume highly creditable to all the parties concerned."

=== Proposed suspension bridge at Kyiv, 1847 ===
In the late 1840s, Bourne started working for Charles Blacker Vignoles, who was employed to construct the Nicholas Chain Bridge in Kyiv over the Dnieper River. Bourne made the following sketch, which was presented to the Tsar in 1847. The construction of the bridge started in 1848 and was completed in 1855. Bourne made drawings and later weekly photographs of every stage of its construction.

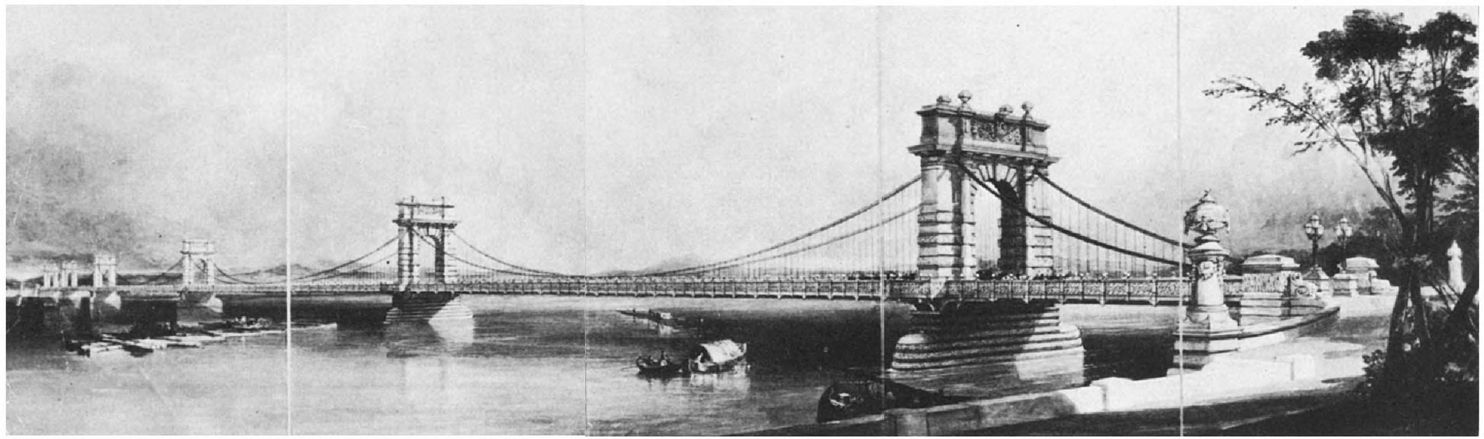
Sketch of proposed suspension bridge at Kyiv designed by Charles Blacker Vignoles and drawn by John Cooke Bourne, 1847.

In this period Bourne also learned to make daguerreotypes, which were introduced in 1839, and calotypes, introduced in 1841. He was encouraged by Charles Blacker Vignoles, who was an amateur photographer, to use those techniques to document the further construction of the bridge. He soon came to realize, that the "photography's precise recording... would supersede drawing as a means of making topographical views" because it was less expensive, and more accurate.

== Legacy ==
=== Railway depiction ===
In the 19th century Bourne gave face to the fascination with the new railway technology. He was among the earliest artists to "integrated the depiction of railway construction into a well established landscape tradition. The rails were sometimes barely visible or coexisted with the stock landscape elements of cattle, rocks, sky, and greenery." Nowadays Bourne is considered one of the greatest railway artists, and is described by Elton as "the Piranesi of the Railway Age." According to Russell (2001) Bourne's two series of railway scene's were the only works, that equalled the work of Thomas Shotter Boys. Burman & Stratton (1997) explained:

The dramatic engineering works for these main lines were, as with canals, largely dependent on hand labour aided by pick and wheelbarrow. Their scale, and the human effort in creating them. is wonderfully conveyed in the drawings of John Cook Bourne, recording Camden Bank and Tring Cutting on the London & Birmingham Railway (Bourne, 1839) and Maidenhead Bridge and Box Tunnel on the Great Western main line from Paddington to Bristol (Bourne, 1846).

More in general Russell (2001) summarizes:

Bourne's work shows the line and associated structures under construction and provides an invaluable record of early-Victorian railway engineering. From his prints we obtain a visual impression of the magnitude of the project and of the disruption to town and countryside that it caused. It is fascinating to see the vast number of men - the navvies - employed in the building of the retaining wall at Camden Town and to appreciate what was involved in a great undertaking such as excavating the cutting at Tring. While contemporary painters liked to populate their pictures, in the words of Francis Klingender, 'with noble, unhurried peasants, pursuing their simple tasks in idyllic surroundings', the only peasants that Bourne includes are running away from the noise and smoke of the rock-blasting at Linslade.

In his Art and the Industrial Revolution, Klingender (1968) had enthused added: "Bourne's Great Western pictures echo the sweep and swagger of Isambard Kingdom Brunel's great broad-gauge railway..."

In his own days, however, Bourne's work had little market value, because "the art patrons of the day wished for anything rather than to be reminded of the social and technological revolution going on all round them." Also the exclusive "pictures like those of J. C. Bourne were understandably seen by a very limited stratum of society, whereas Dickens described what met the eyes of all classes..."

=== Lithography ===
The early work of Bourne has been identified as one of the first excellent examples of the application of lithography, which was invented late 18th century. A chapter on the history of lithography described that after an initiation period early 19th century, commercial exploration of lithography started since 1818:

Since its inception, the use of lithography has been primarily commercial—for maps, music, books, picture reproduction and jobbing printing. Naturalists recorded species: the Frenchman Charles-Alexandre Lesueur (1778–1846) made some of America's earliest lithographs in 1821–2 when he depicted fish in the "Journal of the Academy of Natural Sciences"; Edward Lear's plates for an important study of parrots date from a decade later. Topography dominated during the 1820s, when newly explored lands and the European ‘Grand Tour’ were recorded. Baron Taylor's "Voyages pittoresques et romantiques dans l’ancienne France" (Paris, 1820–78), in some 20 volumes, was the most ambitious project. J. D. Harding, who produced several lithographic drawing manuals, pioneered may of Hullmandel's discoveries, notably lithotint in "The Park and the Forest" (London, 1841). John Cooke Bourne brought poetry to his lithographic record of Britain's railways. Intaglio dominated art reproduction, but some French artists lithographed their own paintings or had them professionally reproduced. The process was ideal for facsimiles of drawings...

Wakefield (1973, p. 37) more specifically adds, that "by the end of the 1830s it was in common use, being employed in some very attractive books like John Britton's Drawings of the London and Birmingham Railway, 1839, with illustrations by John Cooke Bourne. It depends for its effect upon the antipathy between grease and water: a greasy image on a surface of smooth limestone is first moistened and then inked; the image repels the water but accepts the ink, while the stone accepts the water and consequently repels the ink. The image can then be printed on paper by passing stone and paper through a scraper press, which gives a picture in black on a white background. By 1837 it was becoming common practice to add the impression of another stone, printed in a straw colour to give a tinted background, and this produced what are known as tinted lithographs. In England they were developed by C.J. Hullmandel, who was the most important lithographer working in England in the earlier part of the century."

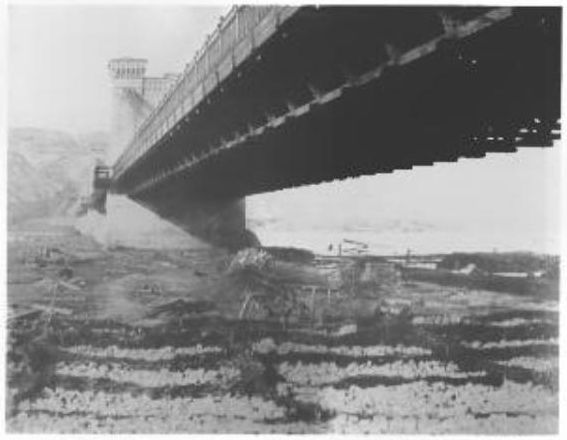
Dnieper Bridge by Bourne, 1855

=== Photography ===
In 1855 Bourne, with home address Holmes Terrace, Kentish Town in the County of Middlesex, was granted a patent for a new camera design, described as Improvements in photographic apparatus. This design "allowed the lens to move in a curved slot the radius of which was the same as the focal length of the lens."

== Publications ==
- John C. Bourne and John Britton. Drawings of the London and Birmingham Railway, 1839.
- Robert Hay, John C. Bourne. Illustration of Cairo. By R. H. Drawn on Stone by J. C. Bourne, 1840
- John C. Bourne. History and Description of the Great Western Railway, 1846.

About John C. Bourne

- Edward Pett Thompson, Life in Russia, Smith, Elder and Co, 1848
- Francis D. Klingender, Art and the Industrial Revolution, Adams & Mackay, 1968
- Hannavy, John, "John Cooke Bourne, Charles Blacker Vignoles and the Dnieper Suspension Bridge", History of Photography, vol. 28, (2004) Winter. pp. 334–347
