= Bushey Arches Viaduct =

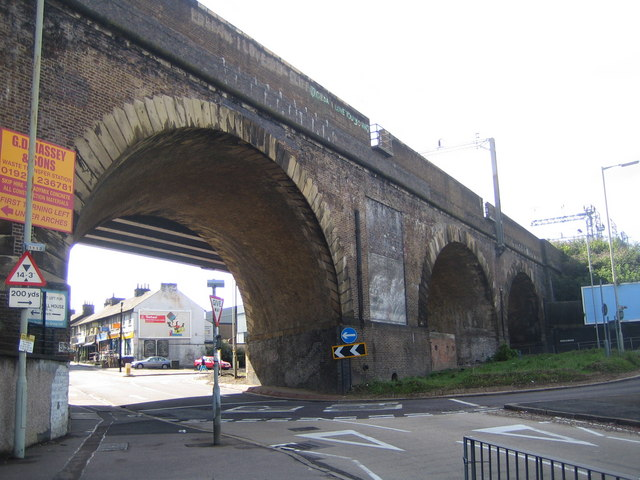
- The viaduct viewed from beside the skewed central arch
- Coordinates: 51°38′49″N 0°23′04″W
- Carries: West Coast Main Line
- Crosses: A4008 road
- Locale: Bushey, Hertfordshire
- Maintained by: Network Rail
- Heritage status: Grade II listed building

Characteristics
- Material: Brick
- No. of spans: 5

History
- Opened: 1837

Bushey Arches Viaduct is a railway bridge on the West Coast Main Line immediately north of Bushey railway station, between Bushey and Watford, in Hertfordshire, Eastern England, just north-west of London.

== Design ==
The viaduct consists of five arches in yellow brick and stone and carries the railway across the London to Watford road. Each arch has roughly a 30-foot (9.1-metre) span and a 25-foot (7.6-metre) rise. The total length of the bridge is about 123 yards (112 metres). The voussoirs (insides of the arches) are in rusticated stone. The centre arch (the one crossing the road) is skewed. It has a prominent parapet, below which is a protruding stone band, and impost bands where the arches meet the piers, all of which are in stone. The viaduct is a local landmark and similar in design to the Colne Viaduct, the next major structure on the line in the Birmingham direction.

== History ==
The viaduct was built by Robert Stephenson for the London and Birmingham Railway, the world's first long-distance railway, which opened fully in 1838. Construction took place from 1834 to 1837. The railway was quadrupled, beginning in 1858. That year, an iron span was built adjacent to the viaduct on its east side. This was expanded in 1875 and then replaced altogether in the 20th century with a steel bridge deck supported by brick and stone piers. Another viaduct, built in 1862 in blue brick, curves away from the Bushey Arches Viaduct at its southern end, carrying the Watford DC line towards Watford High Street railway station.

The viaduct was illustrated by John Cooke Bourne in his series of lithographs on the London and Birmingham Railway, published in 1838.

Beneath the main arch is a Second World War pillbox, once part of the Outer London Defence Ring, a series of obstacles and fortifications designed to hinder an invading army heading towards London.

The viaduct was designated a Grade II listed building, a status which provides legal protection from unauthorised demolition or modification, in 1983.
