= Watford Ring Road =

The Watford Ring Road is a road located in Watford, Hertfordshire, UK. It is numbered A411. The road serves as a clockwise one-way system around the town centre. It has decreased traffic through the town centre and now provides links to every part of Watford, as well as the M1 motorway (by way of the A4008 road).

The road functions like a large external roundabout, and is connected to roads leading in towards the town centre. There are also bus stops on the ring road. Numerous multi-storey car parks can be reached from the ring road: Palace, Queens, Kings, Church, Gade, and Sutton. These are connected to the Harlequin Shopping Centre and Watford Town Centre.

The road is a typical example of 1960s town planning: grade separation is used on three occasions to separate the traffic from pedestrians and cycles. The most notable of these is the large bridge which takes the road across Watford's High Street. Another instance is a short branch from the ring road which crosses an underpass before joining the A412 road at a large grade-separated junction.
