= Bennet Woodcroft =

English textile manufacturer

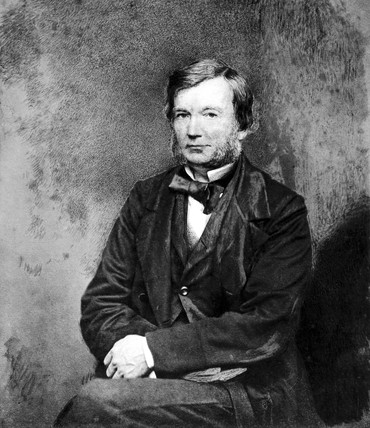
- by William Walker c.1860
- Born: 20 December 1803; Heaton Norris, Lancashire, England
- Died: 7 February 1879 (aged 75); South Kensington, London, England
- Engineering career
- Discipline: Mechanical engineer

Bennet Woodcroft FRS (20 December 1803 – 7 February 1879) was an English textile manufacturer, industrial archaeologist, pioneer of marine propulsion, a leading figure in patent reform and the first clerk to the commissioners of patents.

== Biography ==
Woodcroft was born in Heaton Norris, Lancashire, the third of seven children born to John and Ann Woodcroft. He studied chemistry under Dalton, returning to Lancashire to join his father in business as a dyer and velvet finisher. In 1843, he began a career as a consulting engineer in Manchester and moved to London in 1846, taking up the chair of Professor of Machinery at University College London. In 1852, he was appointed Superintendent of Specifications in the Patent Office and in 1864 became the Clerk of Commissioners responsible for the direction of the office. During his tenure, he founded the Patent Office Library, now part of the British Library, and the Patent Museum, whose collections are now in the Science Museum. He retired 12 years later, in March 1876.

During his career, he authored over a dozen patents in the fields of textiles and naval engineering.

He married Agnes Bertha Sawyer (7 September 1833 – 10 March 1903) in Hampstead in the September Quarter of 1866. She was born in Bosworth, Leicestershire. At this time he was 63 and she 33. They had no children. On the 1871 census they lived alone with servants, on the 1881 census she is widowed living with the cook only.

No biographies or obituaries make any reference to Bennet Woodcroft's personal life and children conceived prior to his marriage. In fact, he had two children with an unmarried woman Matilda Hammond, who lived close to him in Manchester. His son Henry Woodcroft Hammond (1839–1893) also became an engineer and emigrated to San Francisco, where he became President of the Anglo-Pacific Steel Company. His daughter Eleanor Woodcroft Hammond (1844–1918) married a Frenchman, Joseph Pierre Emmanuel Theogene Cluzel (1835–1885) and moved to France, where her descendants survive to this day. Documents show clearly that Bennet Woodcroft kept in touch with his children. One of Henry Woodcroft Hammond's daughters, Frances Mary Hammond (1872–1949), married Master Mariner Charles Henry Cross (1869–1923), a grand uncle of George Cross, FRS, in San Francisco.

Woodcroft died on 7 February 1879, at his residence in South Kensington, and is buried in Brompton Cemetery, London. His portrait is in the National Portrait Gallery.

== Work ==
Woodcroft patented fundamental improvements in textile machinery and ship propulsion, and this in turn led to an absorbing interest in the history of the patent procedure. As a result of a reorganisation of the British Patent Office in 1852, he became Superintendent of Specifications. This gave him the opportunity to develop a private collection of historical machinery.

When the South Kensington Museum was being planned in the mid-1850s, the Patent Office, through Woodcroft, was invited to assemble a collection of industrial devices for display. When the Museum opened in 1857, the building incorporated a separate Patent Office Museum, and Woodcroft remained its driving force until his retirement in 1876.

A born collector, Woodcroft displayed a passion for securing notable items of historical machinery. 1862 was a particularly fruitful year, when due to his efforts, his museum secured Puffing Billy the world's oldest surviving steam railway locomotive (1814), Stephenson's Rocket (1829), which set the design standard for locomotives, and the engine of Henry Bell's Comet (1812), the first steamship to be operated commercially in Europe.

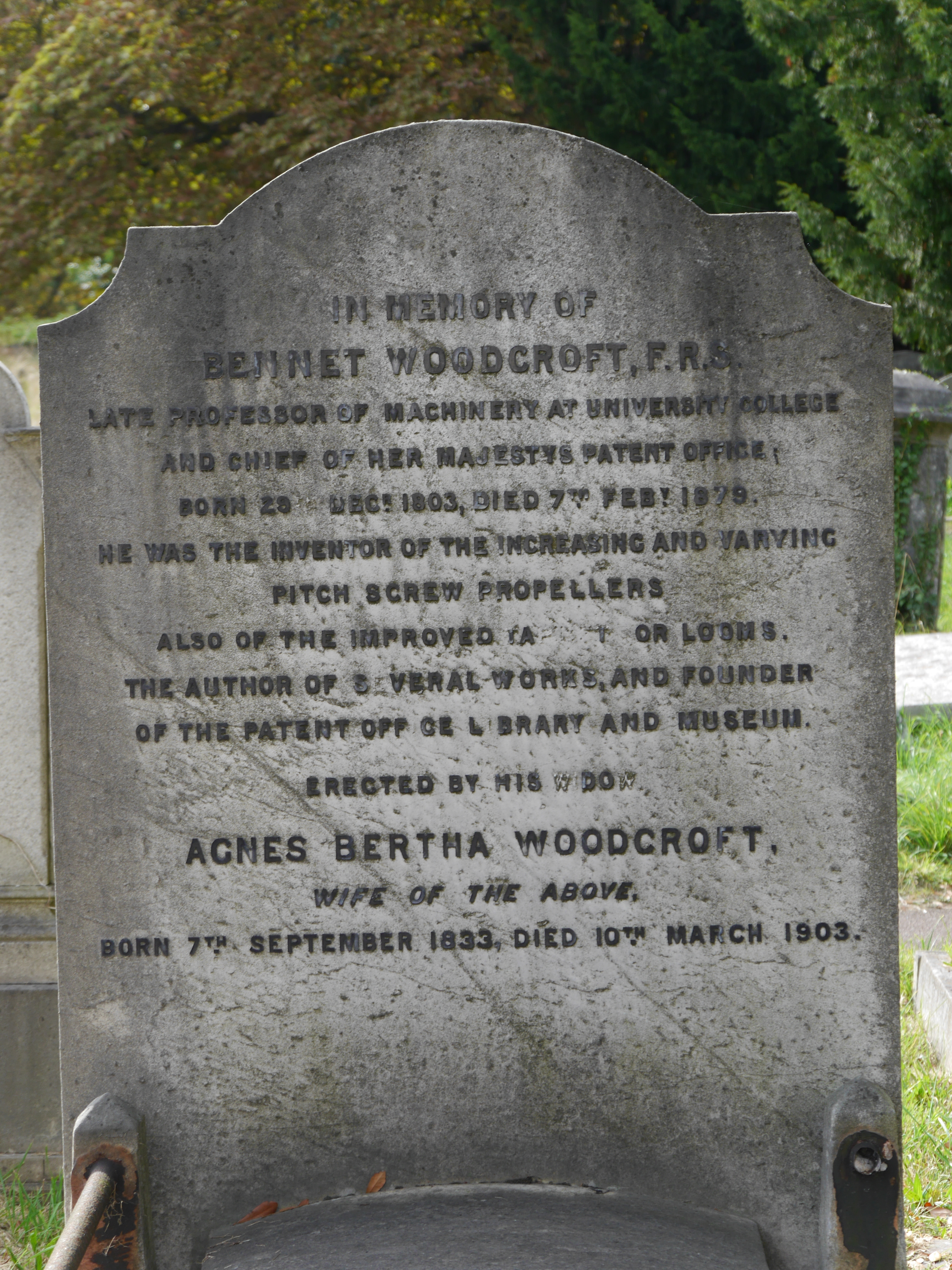
Funerary monument, Brompton Cemetery monument

A letter to his subordinate at South Kensington typifies his single-minded approach: "Get the Comet engine in all its filth" he commanded, emphasising the urgency of the quest. The Patent Office Museum also acquired several examples of stationary steam engine, including a Boulton and Watt beam engine which was the oldest surviving of its type in the world.

Without Woodcroft, it is doubtful that some of the most important artefacts of the first industrial revolution would have ever been preserved.

== Publications ==
- Bennet Woodcroft. Steam navigation. Reprinted from Transactions of the Society of Arts, 1847.
- Bennet Woodcroft. A sketch of the origin and progress of steam navigation from authentic documents with illustrations drawn by J.C. Bourne and lithographed by C.F. Cheffins. 1848
- Bennet Woodcroft,. Alphabetical Index of Patentees of Inventions From 2 March 1617 (14 James I.) to 1 October 1852 (16 Victoriæ). Patent Office (1853)
- Bennet Woodcroft,. Subject-matter Index (made from Titles Only) of Patents of Invention From 2 March 1617 (14 James I.) to 1 October 1852 (16 Victoriae). Two volumes. Patent Office (1853)
- Bennet Woodcroft,. Titles of Patents of Invention, Chronologically Arranged From 2 March 1617 (14 James I.) to 1 October 1852 (16 Victoriae). Two volumes. Patent Office (1853)
- Bennet Woodcroft,. Reference Index of Patents of Invention, from 2 March 1617 (14 James I.) to 1 October 1852 (16 Victoriae). Patent Office (1853)
- Bennet Woodcroft. Patents for inventions. Abridgements of specifications relating to sugar. A.D. 1663–1866. Great Britain. Patent Office (1871)
- as editor: The Pneumatics of Hero of Alexandria, translated from the original Greek by J. W. Greenwood (1851).

== See also ==
- Johann Georg Bodmer
