= Colne Viaduct =

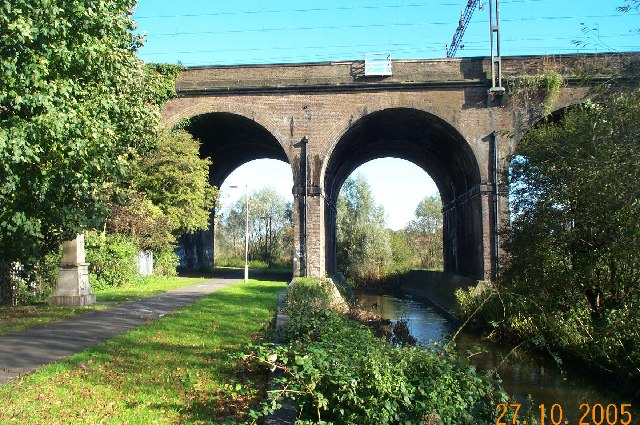
- The viaduct viewed from bank of the Colne
- Coordinates: 51°39′25″N 0°23′14″W
- Carries: West Coast Main Line
- Crosses: River Colne
- Locale: Watford, Hertfordshire
- Maintained by: Network Rail
- Heritage status: Grade II listed building

Characteristics
- Material: Brick
- No. of spans: 5

History
- Opened: 1837

The Colne Viaduct, also known as Five Arches Viaduct, carries the West Coast Main Line railway over the River Colne near Watford in Hertfordshire, Eastern England, just north-west of London. It was built in 1837 for the London and Birmingham Railway by Robert Stephenson.

== Design ==
The London and Birmingham Railway crosses the area around Watford on a series of viaducts and embankments. The Colne Viaduct carries the railway over River Colne in a break between embankments on five round-headed arches. It is built in yellow brick, which is continued on the voussoirs (the tops of the arches). In the abutments on either side are three blind arches, the outermost of which is buried in the adjoining embankment. At the top of the parapet level the arch heads are projecting courses of stonework. The design is similar to that of Bushey Arches Viaduct, the previous major structure on the line in the Birmingham direction. The arches are roughly 40 feet (12 metres) wide and have a maximum rise of 45 feet (14 metres) above the river. The total length is 104 yards (95 metres).

In the 1990s, the A4008 was built through two arches of the viaduct and named Stephenson Way. The road connects Watford town centre with the M1 motorway.

== History ==
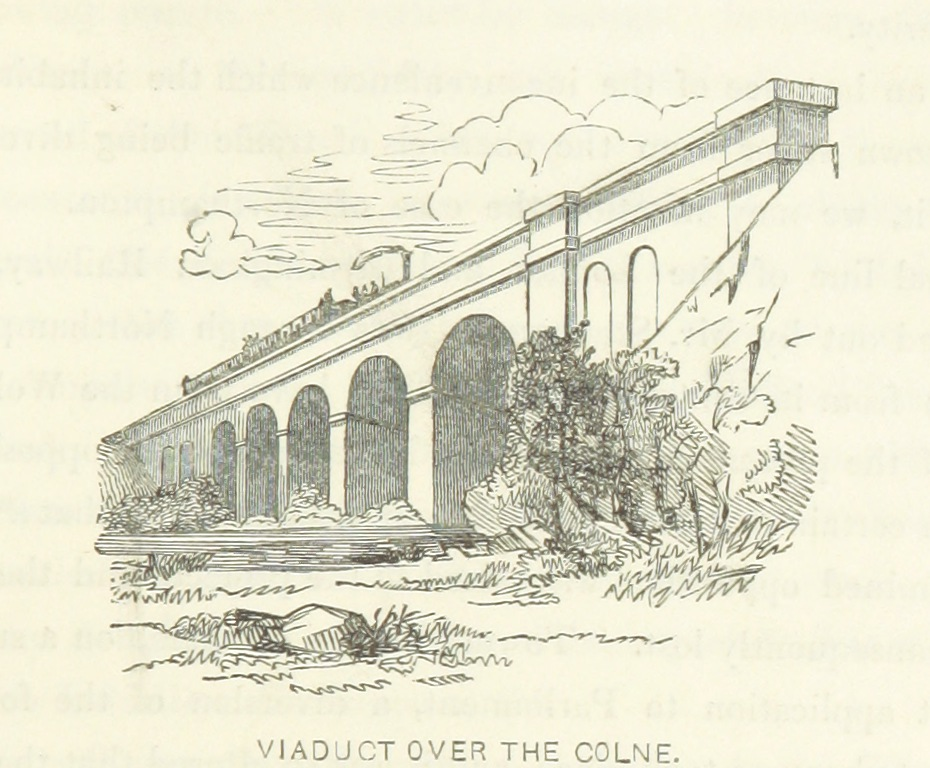
Bourne's lithograph of the viaduct

Work on the viaduct was started in 1836 and completed in 1837. It was built by Robert Stephenson, chief engineer of the London and Birmingham Railway, which fully opened in 1838. A second bridge was built alongside to the east in 1858 and 1875 to allow the railway line to be quadruple-tracked; unlike at Bushey, the widening here was in brick and in a style sympathetic to the original.

The viaduct is the subject of a lithograph and features in another of the adjoining embankment, both by John Cooke Bourne in his account of the building of the London and Birmingham Railway. Matt Thompson of the Ironbridge Gorge Museum Trust described the viaduct's appearance in the lithographs as "almost like a Roman aqueduct" and yet a "clean, white modern structure" that blends in with the landscape, which includes grazing livestock—the area was open countryside when the railway was built.

The viaduct is a Grade II listed building, a legal status which provides protection from unauthorised demolition or modification, first listed in 1983. In front of the viaduct is a Coal-tax post, a stone obelisk marking the point at which duty was payable on coal destined for London; the post is also Grade II listed.
