= Louis Klingender =

British wildlife artist (1861–1950)

Louis Henry Weston Klingender (1861–1950) was a British wildlife artist. He specialized in highly detailed paintings of wildlife, especially of animals in conflict.

== Biography ==
Klingender was born in Liverpool in April 1861 of Huguenot descent. Little is known of his early years, but it is clear that by 1881 he was enrolled at the Kunstakademie Düsseldorf in Germany under German: Carl Friedrich Deiker.

In 1894, Klingender married Florence (née Hoette) and the couple moved to Kronberg. He exhibited frequently at the Berlin Academy and he moved to Goslar in 1902, where he held yearly exhibitions. Klingender devoted a lot of time building up the Goslar Museum, especially their collection of geology and natural history.

On 18 February 1907 his son Francis Klingender was born, who became later known as a famous Marxist, sociologist, economist and art historian.

The Klingender family's good fortune came to an end at the outbreak of World War I in 1914; as a potential spy, he was interned at Ruhleben, a camp near Berlin.

In 1925, Klingender left Germany to settle in England. By that time, grand 'Romantic' wildlife paintings had fallen out of fashion, and Klingender had to rely on his son to support to support him.

Life had become very difficult for the Klingender family in London. Klingender's wife eventually returned to Germany, where she died in 1944. Louis Klingender died in 1950.

Klingender’s works has experienced a resurgence in popularity in auction houses in recent years, with collectors such as property tycoon Warren Anderson (Australian businessman) collecting his works.

== See also ==
- Animal painter
- Düsseldorf School
