= Charles Joseph Hullmandel =

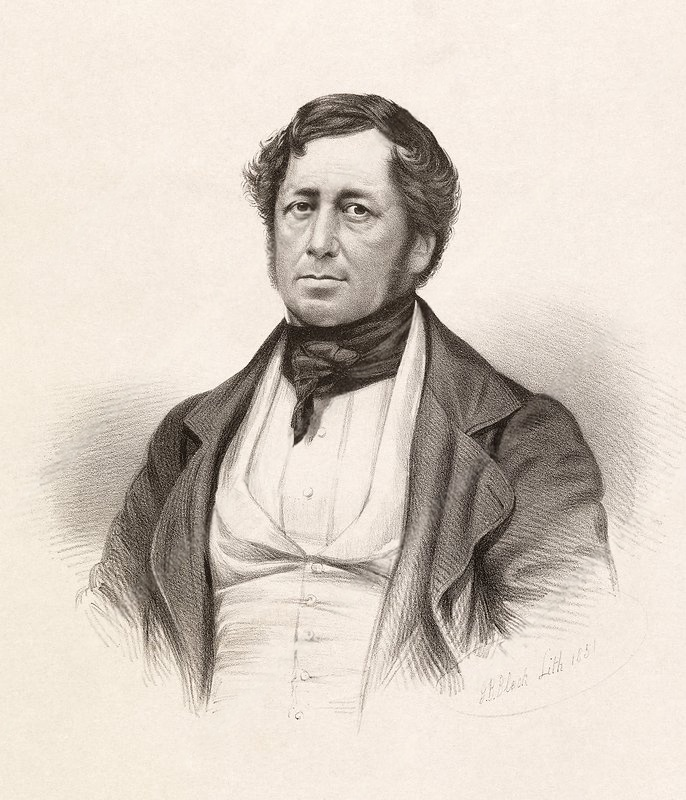
Lithograph by G. B. Black, 1851

Charles Joseph Hullmandel (15 June 1789 – 15 November 1850) was born in London, where he established and maintained the first lithographic establishment in London on Great Marlborough Street from about 1819 until his death. He introduced various improvements to the process including what he called the lithotint. Greatly reducing the cost from older copperplate engravings they made reproductions of artwork more accessible and contributed to numerous publications in the period.

== Life and work ==
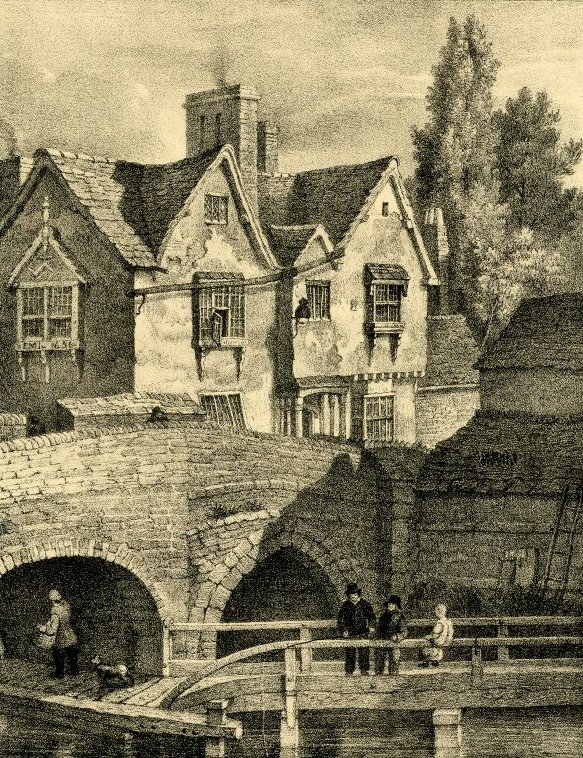
"Old buildings on the West Bridge, Leicester", c. 1830

Hullmandel was born in Queen Street, Mayfair. His father was a German-speaking musician and composer, Nicolas-Joseph Hüllmandel (1756–1823), a native of Strasbourg who became a pupil of C. P. E. Bach and from 1780 spent ten years as a fashionable music teacher in Paris. In 1787 he married Camille-Aurore du Cazan, who was of a noble French family, and in 1789 sent his wife to England, following her in 1790, as the French Revolution unfolded.

As a young man, Charles Hullmandel studied art and spent several years living and working in continental Europe. He learned printmaking after meeting Alois Senefelder in Munich and printed many of his own works. His earliest works included Twenty-Four Views of Italy (1818) printed by Moser and Harris, Somers Town, but published under his address. In 1818, he set up a printing press at his home in London after a visit to Munich with Rudolph Ackermann, and went on to study chemistry under Michael Faraday for the purpose of improving his printing. In 1821 he tried to learn the process used by Engelmann in Germany and entered into a short-lived partnership with Engelmann, Coindet and Co of Paris. An early and influential work was the work on Britannia delineata (1822-23) for which he collaborated with James Duffield, Samuel Prout and William Westall.

Hullmandel wrote two major works on lithography, Manual of Lithography (1820), a translation of the work of Raucourt de Charleville and in 1824, his own The Art of Drawing on Stone. He improved lithographic techniques, making use of Michael Faraday as a technical consultant. He developed techniques for the correction of errors and for creating tones. He also introduced the first British color lithographs which were introduced in George Alexander Hoskins' Travels in Ethiopia (1835). During the first half of the 19th century Hullmandel became one of the most important figures in the development of British lithography, and his name appears on the imprints of thousands of lithographic prints. He developed a method called the lithotint for reproducing gradations in tones and for creating the effect of soft colour washes which enabled the printed reproduction of Romantic landscape paintings of the type made popular in England by J. M. W. Turner. In 1843 he went into partnership with Joseph Fowell Walton (born 1812, living 1863), a cousin of the landscape artist and lithographer William Louis Walton, the firm then becoming known as Hullmandel & Walton.

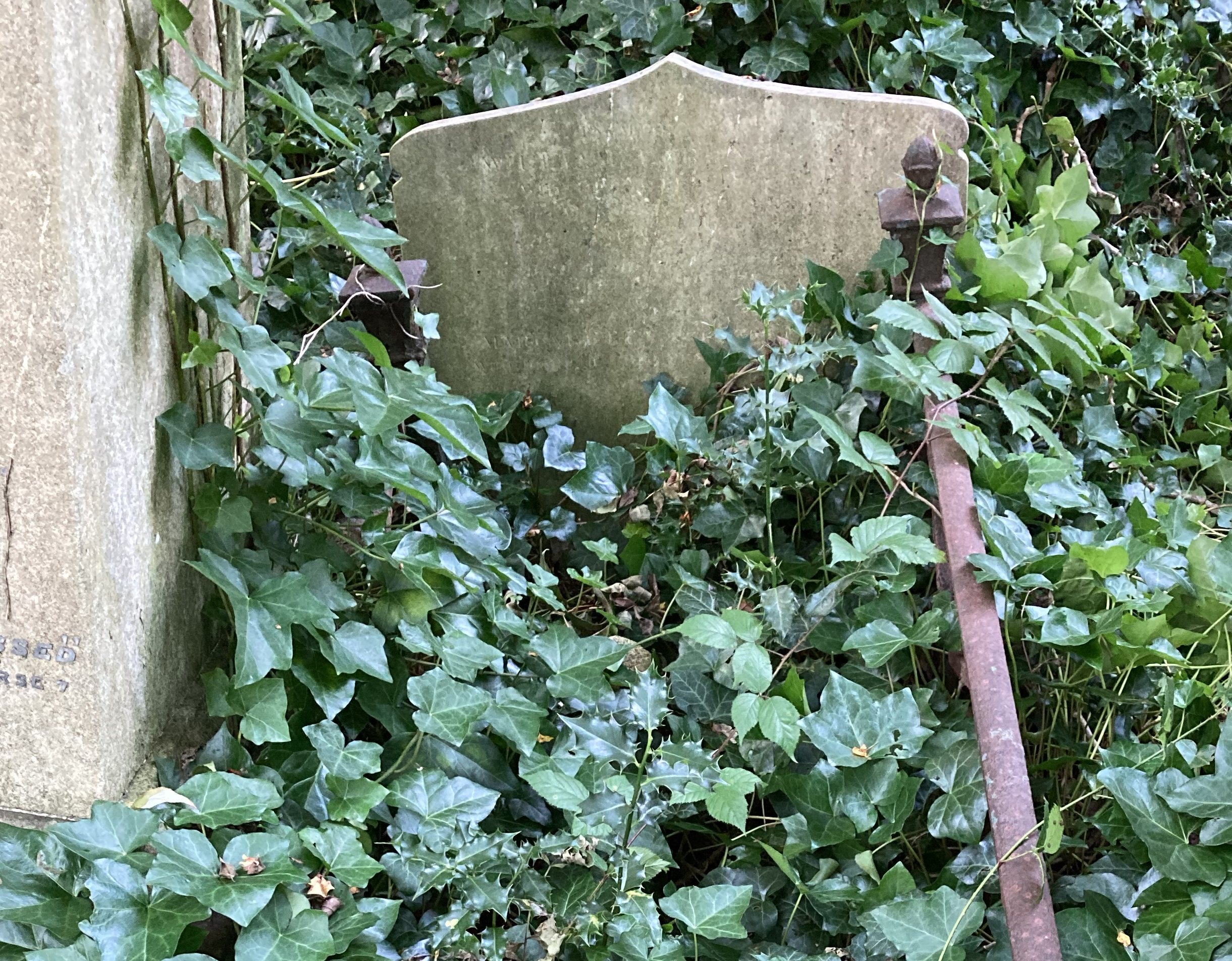
Overgrown grave of Charles Joseph Hullmandel in Highgate Cemetery

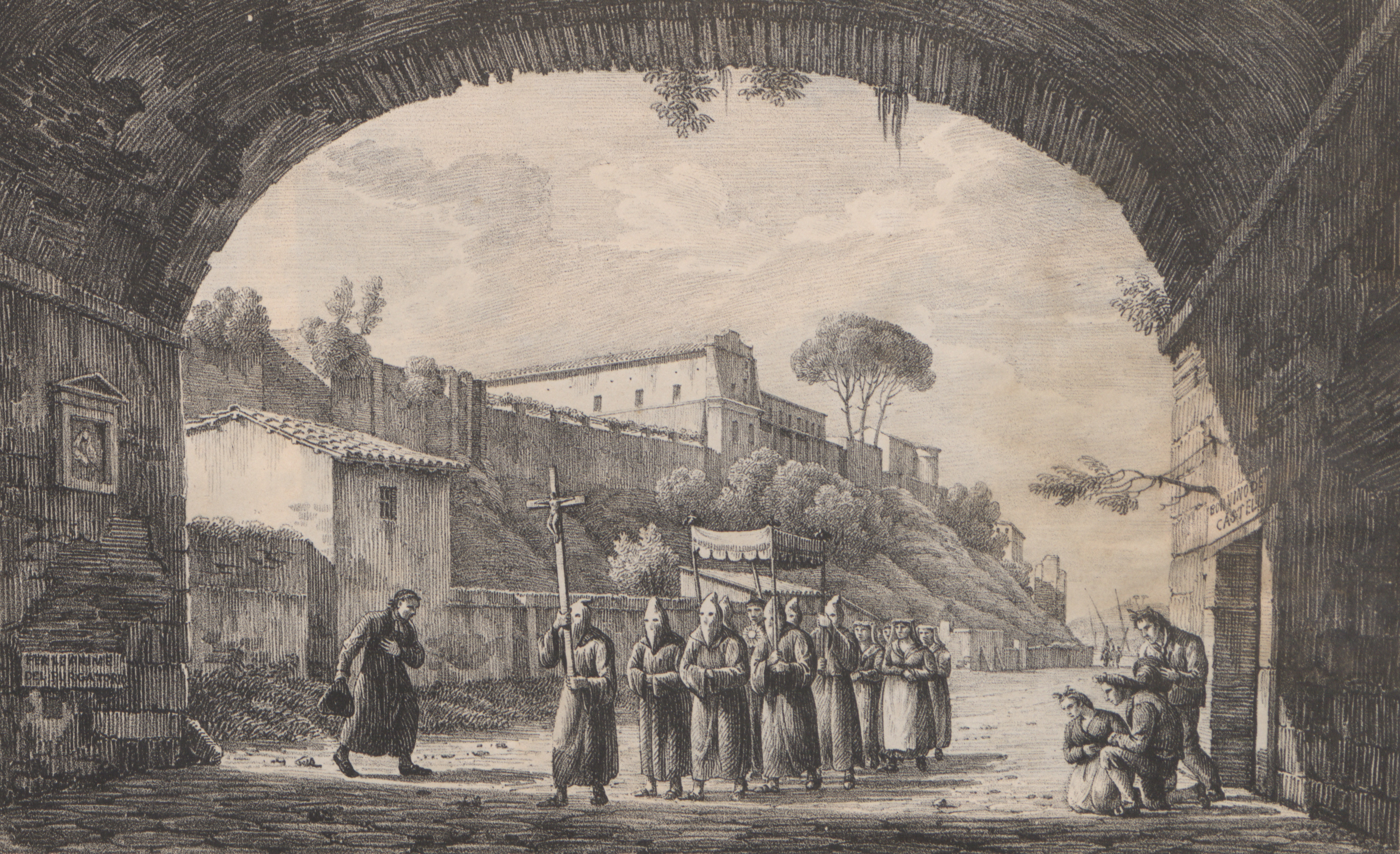
The Aventino, from Twenty-four views of Italy (1818)

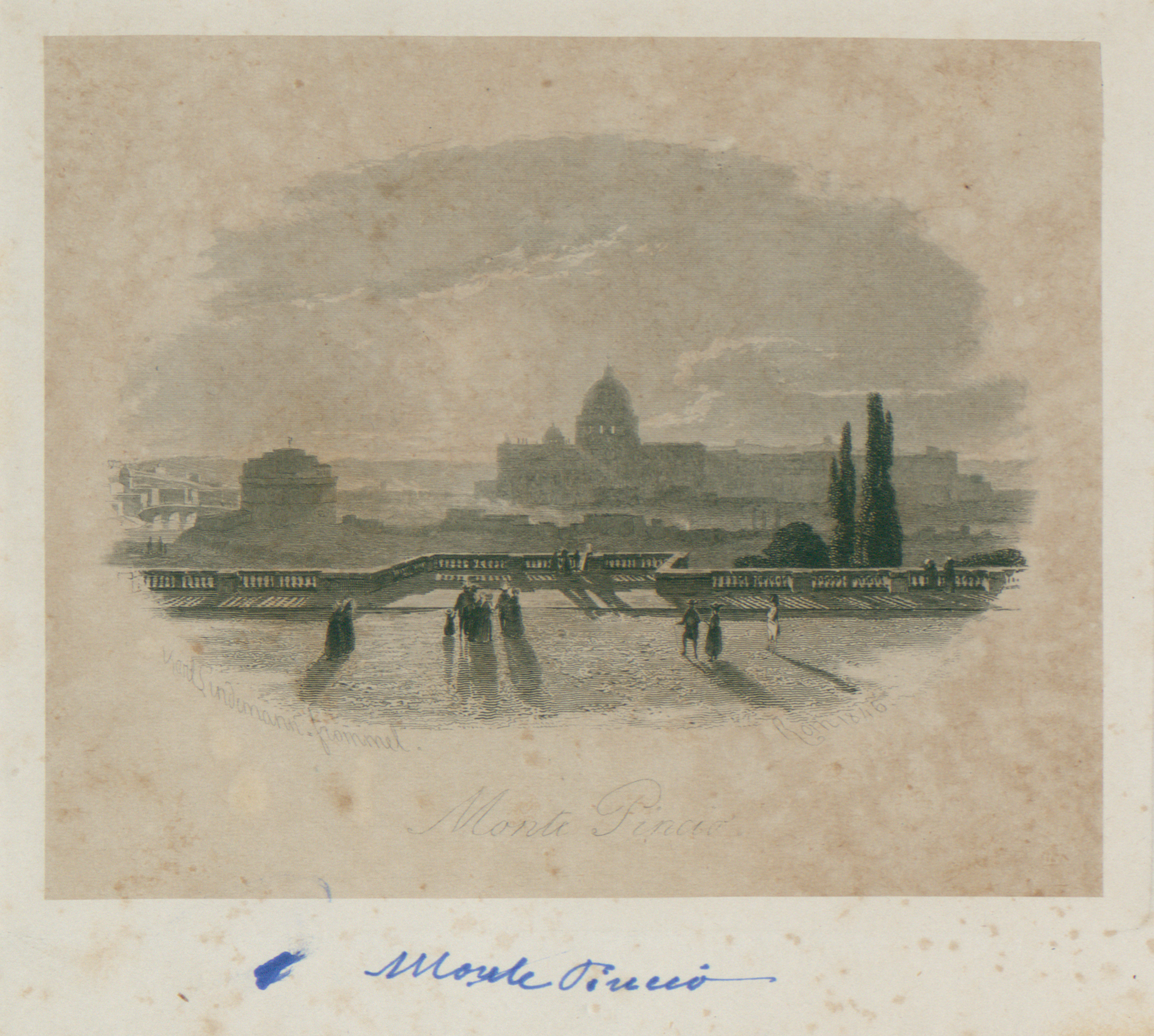
The Monte Pincio, from Twenty-four views of Italy (1818)

Hullmandel lived with his sister Adelaide Charlotte Evelina (d. 1839) and her partner Valentine Bartholomew (1799–1879). He died of a stroke at home on Great Marlborough Street, in 1850 and was buried on the western side of Highgate Cemetery.
