= Charles Cheffins =

British mechanical draughtsman, cartographer, consulting engineer, and surveyor

Charles Frederick Cheffins
- Born: 10 September 1807; London, England
- Died: 22 October 1861 (aged 54)
- Occupations: Cartographer, consulting engineer, and mechanical draughtsman
- Notable work: Cheffins' Map of English & Scotch Railways 1850
- Children: Charles Richard Cheffins George Alexander Cheffins

Charles Frederick Cheffins (10 September 1807 – 22 October 1861) was a British mechanical draughtsman, cartographer, consulting engineer, and surveyor. He was an assistant to John Ericsson and George Stephenson, and surveyed for many British railroad companies in the mid-19th century. He is also known for the 1850 Cheffins' Map of English & Scotch Railways and other maps.

== Biography ==
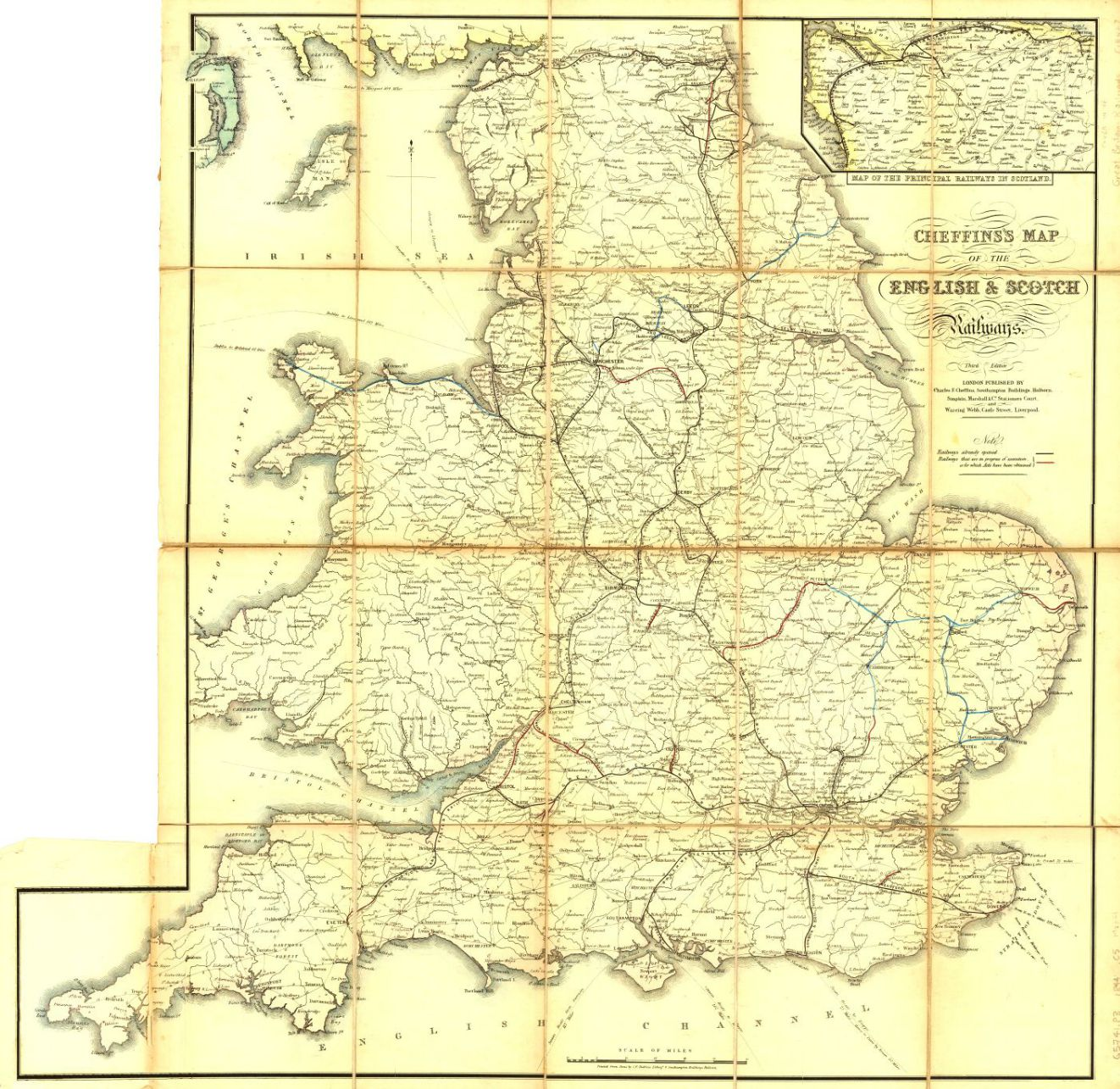
Cheffins' Map of English & Scotch Railways, 1850

Cheffins was born in London, where his father was the manager of the New River Waterworks Company and supervised the manufacturing of wooden pipes used to supply water to the metropolis. Young Cheffins was admitted into Christ's Hospital as a scholar in July 1815. He remained there until 1822, diligently pursuing his studies, and received several gold medals for his proficiency in mathematics.

Upon completion of his education, he was apprenticed to Messrs. Newton and Son, patent agents and mechanical draughtsmen, where he became practised in making drawings from specifications and from models of machinery. He remained as an employee with Messrs. Newton and Son for some time after completing his apprenticeship.

From 1830 he was engaged by Captain John Ericsson to assist in making drawings for locomotive engines. The next year he became assistant to George Stephenson and prepared plans and sections of the projected Grand Junction Railway. On the completion of the parliamentary submissions for the Grand Junction Railway, between 1832 and 1833, he set up his own cartographical and drawing business, and spent over two decades working as a surveyor for numerous railroad construction projects in the United Kingdom. In 1838, he published his first Map of the Grand Junction Railway and Adjacent Country; and the next year Cheffins's Official Map of the Railway from London to Birmingham, Manchester and Liverpool. In 1846, Cheffins commissioned John Cooke Bourne to write the History of the Great Western Railway. Occasionally, Cheffins also published lithographical work by others. In the year 1848, he had been elected an Associate of the Institution of Civil Engineers and continued to take interest in all their proceedings.

One year before his death in 1861, the partnership between Cheffins and his sons—as surveyors, draftsmen, and lithographers—was dissolved by mutual consent. The business continued with Cheffins and his son Charles Richard Cheffins as partners. Cheffins died suddenly from internal injuries on 22 October 1861. (Note: The 1862 ICE Memories lists 22 October 1860 as the date of death, yet describes that Cheffins died at the age of 54. With 10 September 1807 as the date of birth, his date of death should have been after 10 September 1861.) His death, at the age of fifty-four, was said to have greatly impacted his friends, colleagues, and assistants, who had served under him in the numerous parliamentary campaigns in which he had been engaged – and to many of whom he had shown much kindness in recommending them to posts of trust and responsibility on the Indian Railways.

== Work ==
=== Locomotive design ===
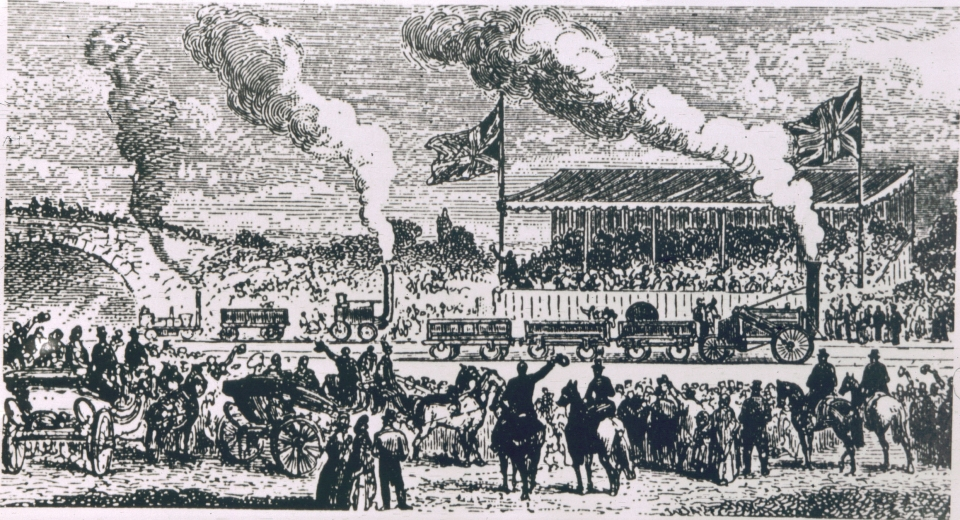
Contemporary drawing of the Rainhill Trials from the Illustrated London News

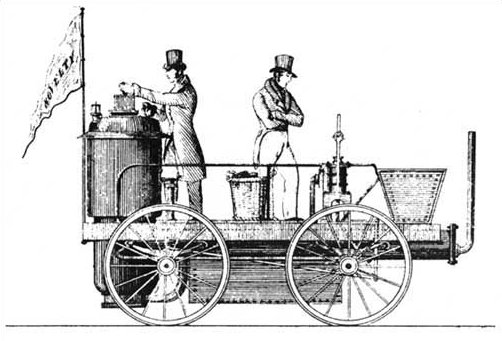
Novelty, Braithwaite and Ericsson's entry for the Rainhill Trials. Illustration from The Mechanics Magazine, 1829.

About the year 1830, he was engaged by Captain John Ericsson to assist in making the drawings for the Novelty locomotive engine, then about to be constructed by Messrs. Braithwaite and Ericsson, to compete against the Stephenson's Rocket and other locomotives on the Rainhill Trials on the Manchester and Liverpool Railway. The competition went against the Novelty, on account of the failure of its blast apparatus.

Cheffins was present at the opening of the Liverpool and Manchester Railway, and remained some time longer with Captain Ericsson, making drawings for other inventions, among which was a steam fire-engine and a caloric engine – machines which gained public attention, the former of which coming into general use. Cheffins's practical knowledge of machinery rendered him a valuable assistant in the preparation of the designs.

=== Testimony in patent-right lawsuits ===
In 1830, Cheffins reputation was such that he testified for the "defendants" in the patent infringement case of Lord Galloway and Alexander Cochrane versus John Braithwaite and John Ericsson, in the Court of Chancery, where it was alleged that the boilers of the Novelty locomotive were of a type too similar to a design of the plaintiffs and where the Lord Chancellor found for the defendants. (Note: Cheffins gave the following testimony: Mr. Charles Frederick Cheffins, mechanical draughtsman, saith, that on 27 July 1830, he went to the manufactory of Mr. Galloway, and saw the boiler exhibited by him in operation. There was no vessel containing a column of water attached to the said boiler, but that, on the contrary, there was a considerable quantity of smoke issuing out from the upper extremity of the upright open pipe or chimney (Y). He asked Mr. Galloway, jun., where said column of water was placed, so as to afford resistance to the passage of the heated air? That Mr. Galloway, jun. told him they did not use a column of water to this boiler, but that in order to obtain a resistance they had diminished the area of the upright open pipe or chimney, so that its area should be less than the area of the flue in the boiler (but which area, to the best of the deponent's judgment, was more than thirty square inches; that is to say, the pipe measured five Inches by eight), thereby affecting the desired object. That deponent farther observed, that the ante-chamber or magazine through which the furnace was supplied with fuel was not surrounded by water, as represented in the plaintiffs' specification and drawing. That the deponent considers that the plaintiffs have been enabled to dispense with such contrivance, from the reason that the heated air, instead of being subjected to a considerable pressure at the end of the flues, is suffered to escape freely into the atmosphere through an open pipe or chimney, whose sectional area, to the best of deponent's belief, measures five inches by eight inches. That upon asking Mr. Galloway, jun. how long said boiler had been in operation, he was answered, that it had been in constant work for seven months. That a boiler was shown to deponent constructed with a vessel to contain water, and an upright tube similar to drawing in plaintiffs' specification, but which deponent was informed had only been used for experiments, and that the said boiler was not in operation at the time deponent saw it. The Lord Chancellor responded:... with respect to that case of Cochrane and Braithwaite, correct me if I am wrong with respect to those affidavits handed in, which I was to look at, respecting the patent for steam-engines; I do not find that Mr. Galloway carries back the use of the boiler beyond six months... Now the patent of Mr. Braithwaite is one year and a half old, and it is dated in January, 1829; so that this boiler which Mr. Galloway is now showing was, in point of fact, not in use till one year after Mr. Braithwaite's patent was obtained. Under these circumstances, I think the parties ought to be left to try their right at law, and the injunction to be dissolved. It is quite unnecessary for me, in this stale of things, to give any opinion with respect to the patent; but this much, however, I will state, I have read the specification with attention, and the evidence, and it appears to me that the objects of the two patents are different...)

Subsequently, Cheffins took the stand in court more often. In one 1847 case narrated in The Railway Record, "Charles F. Cheffins, engineer and surveyor, was called for the defence, proved that he had examined the plans and sections in question, and detected so many errors that the case became quite clear."

=== Grand Junction Railway ===
In 1831, Cheffins was introduced to railway pioneer George Stephenson by Stephenson's oldest associate and surveyor, a Mr. Padley. After the successful opening of the Liverpool and Manchester Railway, Stephenson became prominently involved in numerous other schemes.

Cheffins' first occupation under Stephenson was the preparation of the plans and sections of the projected Grand Junction Railway, which was to connect the towns of Birmingham and Liverpool; and his persevering industry was noticed by, among other eminent engineers, Joseph Locke, Frederick Swanwick, Daniel Gooch.

=== Lithograph of London Station ===
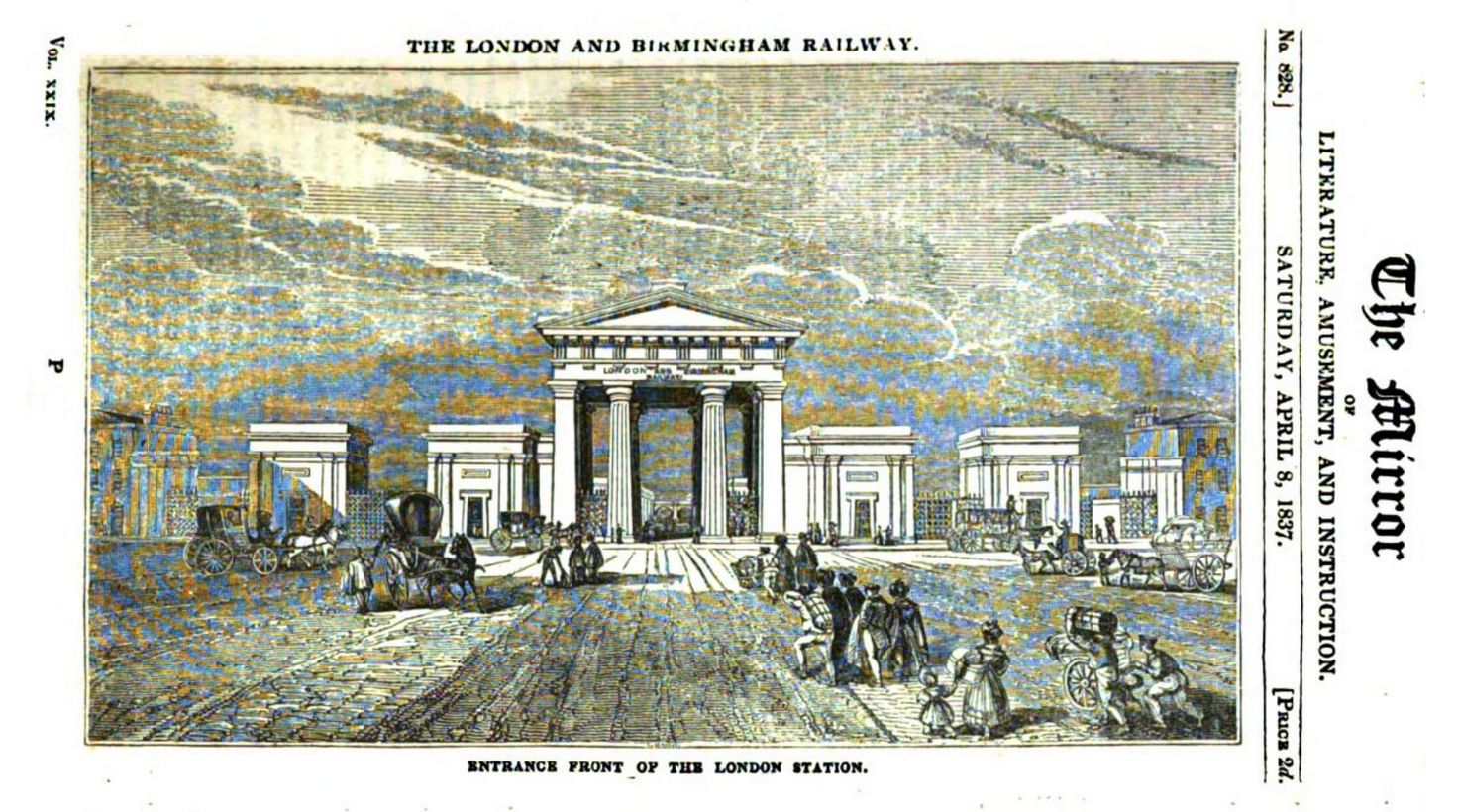
Entrance Front of the London Station by C.F. Cheffins, published 3 April 1837

In 1830, Cheffins started making lithographs, which were published in magazines such as an engraving representing the London Terminus of the London and Birmingham Railway, at Button Grove, in an 1837 issue of John Limbird's The Mirror of Literature, Amusement, and Instruction. The engraving was reduced from a drawing by Thomas Allom and lithographed by Cheffins.

The structure was being erected at the time of the publication. The building was designed by Philip Hardwick, an architect of St. Katherine's Docks, Goldsmith's Hall, the City Clubhouse, and other buildings. The facade of the railway station would occupy about 300 feet towards Drummond Street, opposite a wide opening into Euston Square. The principal elevation consisted of a Grecian Doric portico, with two antae, and two lodges, one on each side, the latter to house the offices of the company; the spaces between the columns and antae of the portico, and also of the lodges, were enclosed by iron gates.

=== Other lithographic work ===
Map of 1854 cholera outbreak by John Snow, drawn and printed by C.F. Cheffins

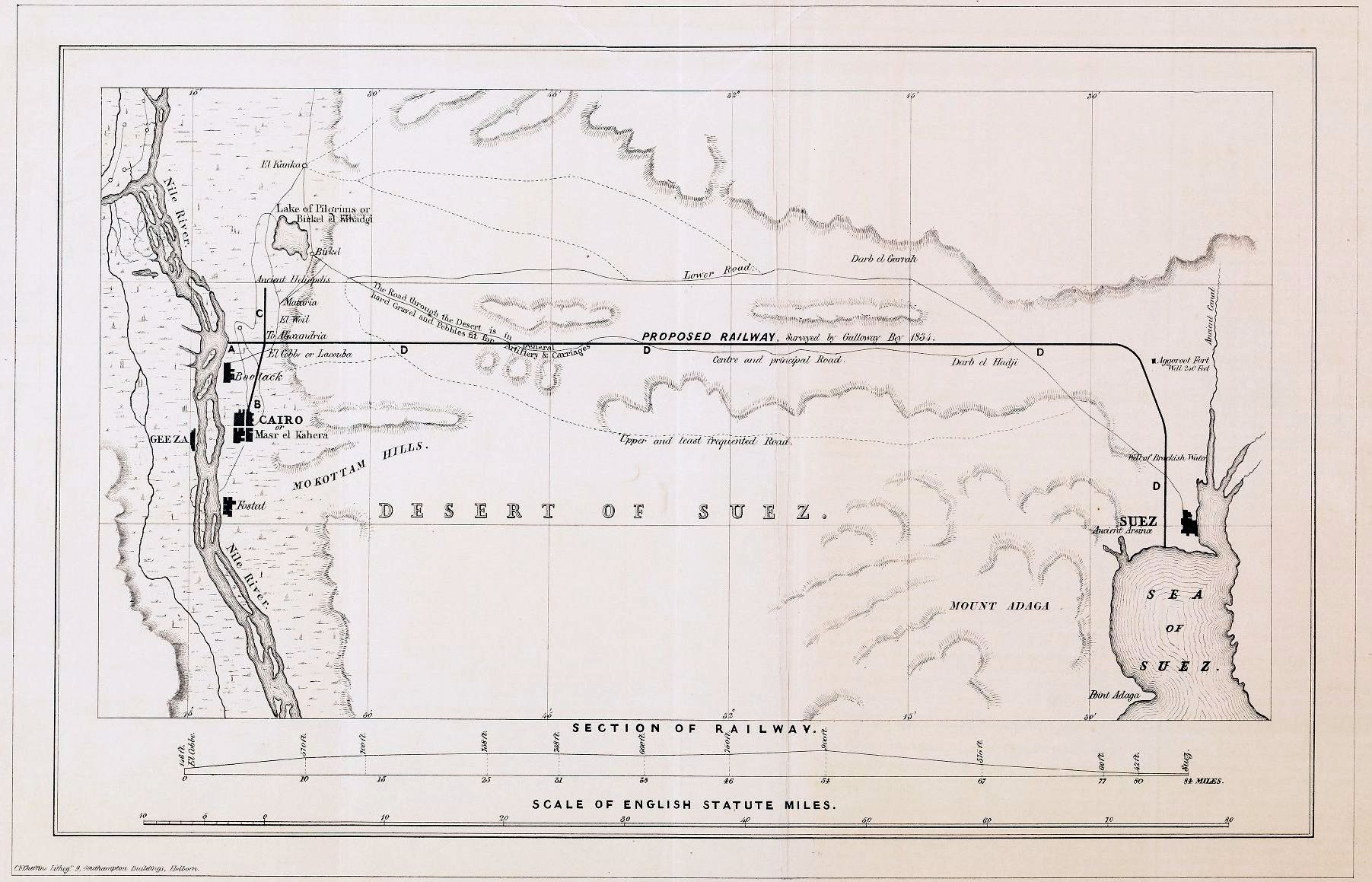
Proposed railway from Cairo to the Sea of Suez by C.F. Cheffins, 1840s

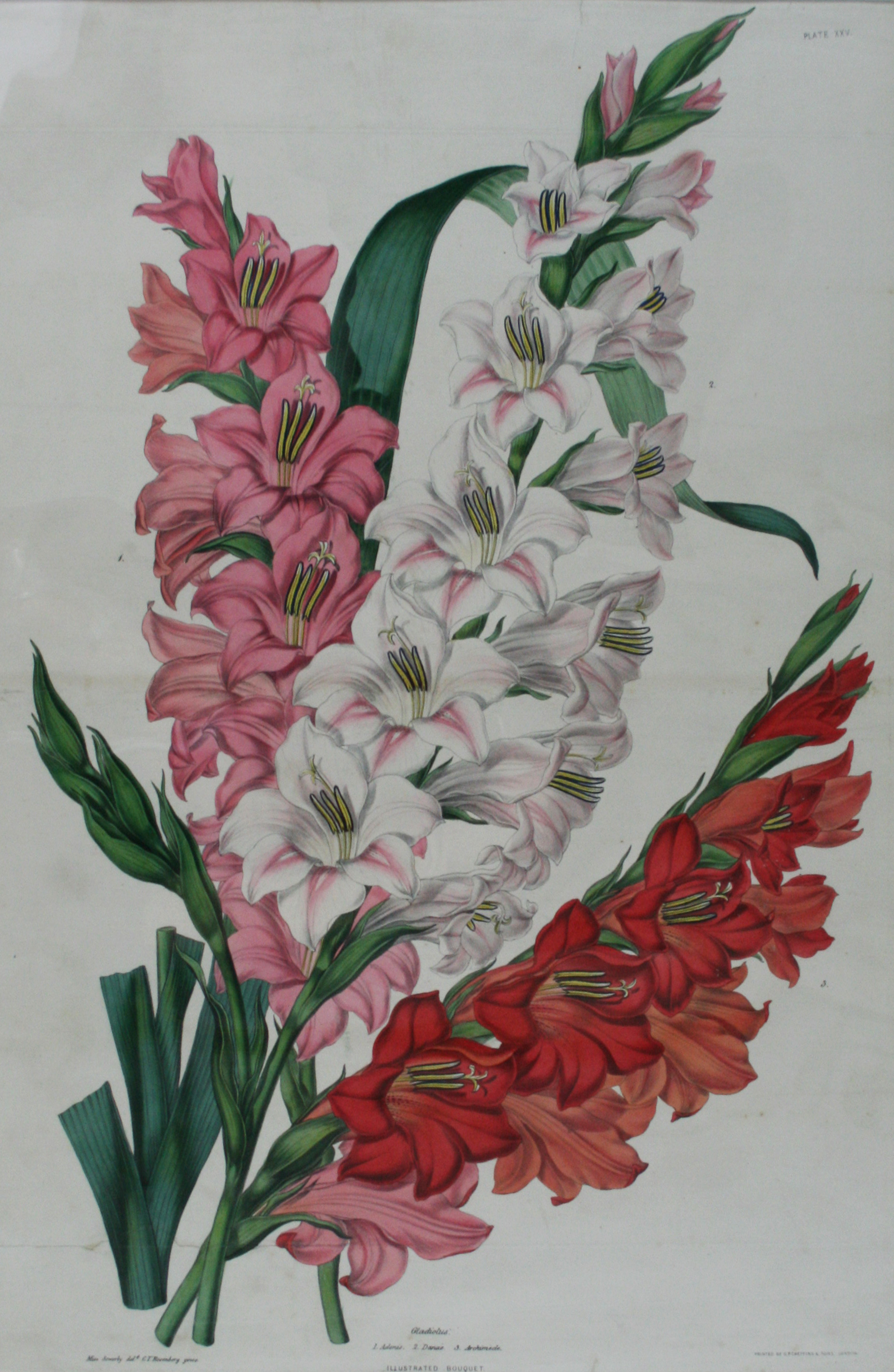
Gladioli: Red, Pink & White by C.F. Cheffins, 1860

In his studio at 9, Southampton Buildings, Holborn, Cheffins lithographed work for numerous other artists:

- 1837 – In the month of August, Cheffins published a lithographed plate of a view of the apparatus used in the steamboat Francis B. Ogden, with a description of its construction and use.
- 1837 – Illustrations for the book Scenery in the north of Devon. George Rowe; Charles F. Cheffins; Paul Gauci; George Hawkins; Henry Strong; G. Wilkins. Published by J. Banfield, Ilfracombe.
- 1844 – Illustrations for Quarterly papers on architecture. : Forty-one engravings, many of which are coloured. by Richard Hamilton Essex; John Richard Jobbins; (Note: Jobbins was Cheffins' brother-in-law, having married Jane Cheffins in 1831.) John Henry Le Keux; Charles F. Cheffins; R Gould; Published by London: Iohan Weale.
- 1848 – Illustration "Perspective view of machinery in Fulton's Clermont" for Henry Bernoulli Barlow
- 1848 – Illustrations for A sketch of the origin and progress of steam navigation from authentic documents by Bennet Woodcroft.
- 1852 – Lithographed illustrations of The Garden Companion and Florists' Guide by Thomas Moore.
- 1852 – Lithographed London map designed by Benjamin Rees Davies.
- 1854 – Drawing and publication of the famous map by John Snow that shows the clusters of cholera cases in the London epidemic of 1854.

=== Railroad surveys ===
On the completion of the parliamentary submissions for the Grand Junction Railway, Cheffins terminated his engagement with Stephenson. Foreseeing that railway schemes were only then in their infancy and that much work might be anticipated, Cheffins devoted himself exclusively to the surveying department of the profession and established himself in London, working independently, while retaining the patronage of those with whom he had been previously associated and adding other names to his list of friends. Robert Stephenson, the son of George, was among the latter, and under his direction and superintendence, Cheffins prepared many of the designs for the construction of the bridges on the London and Birmingham Railway. Cheffins was also engaged by Stephenson on other matters. Their friendship lasted until Stephenson's death, and Cheffins continued to hold him in high regard as someone crucial to his own success.

In his further professional career, Cheffins completed numerous projects for the London and Blackwall Railway, the Great Eastern Railway (then the Eastern Counties Railway), the Trent Valley Line, and the North Staffordshire Railway—a few of which he lived to see to completion, although they were opposed in both houses of Parliament by other companies and large landed proprietors.

In 1846, in recognition for Cheffins's services, a service of plate was presented to him by, among others, the leading engineers of the day.

The last initiative Cheffins was a part of was the projected Great Eastern Northern Junction Railway Bill of 1860, (known familiarly as the "Coal Line"), which his friend George Parker Bidder had put in his hands. He worked on this with considerable zeal, but died before its completion.

=== Family members ===
His work in furtherance of the Coal Line was completed by his eldest son, Charles Richard Cheffins (1833–1902), who had undertaken some of the preliminary surveys for the London, Chatham and Dover Railway and, in the 1850s, worked with Robert Stephenson on the Alexandria to Cairo railway and with Sir John Rennie in Portugal. This son was later involved in laying out the Midland Railway between Bedford and London, and prepared plans for the proposed line between Sittingbourne and Maidstone. He retired to Kent in 1880, served as a County Councillor there and co-founded the Gillingham Portland Cement Company, of which he became Managing Director. He married a sister of the politician Joseph Craven, and their eleven children included the suffragette Georgina Fanny Cheffins.

George Alexander Cheffins (1835–1863), C. F. Cheffins's second son, married in July 1863 a daughter of Joseph James Forrester, surveyor and cartographer of the Douro valley, but died less than two months later, aged 27.

== Selected publications ==
Cheffins published dozens of maps, most of railways. A selection:

- Charles F. Cheffins. London & Birmingham railway: a plan of the line and adjacent country. London: C. F. Cheffins, 1835.
- Charles F. Cheffins. London and Birmingham railway: Map of the Railway from London to Box-Moor, and the adjacent Country. London: Charles F. Cheffins, 1 August 1837; 1838 edition with Thomas W. Streeter.
- Charles F. Cheffins; Thomas W. Streeter. Map of the Grand Junction Railway and adjacent country. 1838
- Charles Frederick Cheffins. Cheffins's Official Map of the Railway from London to Birmingham, Manchester and Liverpool. Wrightson & Webb. 1839
- Charles F. Cheffins; North Woolwich Railway. Plan and section of the North Woolwich Railway, in the counties of Essex and Kent. 1844
- Charles Frederick Cheffins. Cheffins's map of the railways in Great Britain: from the ordnance surveys. 1845
- Charles F. Cheffins. Map of the North Staffordshire lines: deposited with the Clerks of the Peace, Novr. 1845
- Charles F. Cheffins. Plans and Sections of the Norwich and Dereham Railway 1845
- Charles F. Cheffins. Furness Railway. London: C.F. Cheffins, lithographer, 1846.
- Charles Frederick Cheffins. Cheffins's Map of English & Scotch Railways: accurately delineating all the lines at present opened; and those which are in progress. Corrected to the present time, the map also shows the main roads throughout the kingdom, with the distances between the towns, forming a complete guide for the traveller and tourist. 1847, 1850
- Charles F. Cheffins. Proposed railway from Cairo to the Sea of Suez. London: C.F. Cheffins, 184ff.
- Charles F. Cheffins. Cheffins's station map of the railways in Great Britain, from authentic sources. London: Charles F. Cheffins and Sons, 1859

Other maps, a selection:

- Charles Frederick Cheffins. Chart of the Gulf of Mexico, off St. Joseph's Island. R. Hastings, 1841
- Charles Frederick Cheffins. A map of the Republic of Texas and the adjacent territories, indicating the grants of land conceded under the Empresario System of Mexico. London: R. Hastings, 1841.
- Charles Frederick Cheffins; Monroe. Aranzas Bay, as surveyed by Captn. Monroe of the 'Amos Wright{'}. London: R. Hastings, 1841
- Benjamin Rees Davies; Charles F. Cheffins; Orr & Compy.; Letts, Son & Co.; J. Cross & Son. London and its environs. London: Charles F. Cheffins. 1854
- Charles Frederick Cheffins. Plan of the Manor of Newington Barrow, Otherwise Highbury, in Islington. C.F. Cheffins, Lithr. 1856
