= William Louis Walton =

English lithographer

William Louis Walton (1808?-4 May 1879) was a prolific English lithographer active in London in the nineteenth century.
