= Francis Klingender =

British art historian (1907–1955)

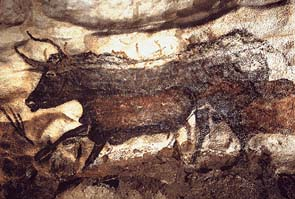
The Black Bull from the Lascaux Caves, one of the first illustrations in Animals in Art and Thought.

Francis Donald Klingender (1907 – 9 July 1955) was a Marxist art historian and exponent of Kunstsoziologie whose uncompromising views meant that he never quite fitted into the British art history establishment.

Klingender was born in Goslar, Germany, to British parents. At the start of the first World War, his father, Louis Henry Weston Klingender (1861–1950), was interned near Berlin on suspicion of spying for the British. The family moved back to England in the 1920s and Klingender supported them while attending night classes at the London School of Economics. He subsequently embarked on an academic career in sociology, becoming a lecturer in that subject at the University of Hull, which position he retained until his death.

His magnum opus was Animals in Art and Thought to the End of the Middle Ages, published posthumously, and edited by Evelyn Antal, wife of Frederick Antal, and John Harthan. Klingender inherited an interest in this subject from his father who had been a painter of animals, and he added to that his own sociological, Marxist and Freudian interpretations. His thesis was that as well as being the companions and servants of man, the depiction of animals in art was symbolic of the hidden or secret urges of society. He was encouraged in his work by Julian Huxley, whose suggestions were incorporated into the final work. Klingender had intended to complete the work up to the nineteenth century, and possibly later, however, on his death the manuscript was only substantially complete up to the end of the Middle Ages and the editors took the decision to publish only up to that point, hence the chosen title. Later periods were added as an Epilogue from the available notes.

== Selected publications ==
- Money Behind the Screen. A report prepared on behalf of the Film Council by F. D. Klingender and Stuart Legg, etc.. London: Film Council of Great Britain, Lawrence & Wishart, 1937.
- Hogarth and English Caricature. (Ed.) Transatlantic Arts, 1944.
- Art and the Industrial Revolution. London; Noel Carrington, 1947. ISBN 0586081224
- Goya in the Democratic Tradition. London; Sidgwick & Jackson, 1948.
- Animals in Art and Thought to the End of the Middle Ages. Edited by Evelyn Antal and John Harthan. London: Routledge and Kegan Paul, 1971. ISBN 0710068174
- 5 on Revolutionary Art. Essays by Herbert Read, F.D. Klingender, Eric Gill, A.L. Lloyd, Alick West. Edited by B. Real.
