= A4008 road =

Road in England

Coordinates: 51.6405°N 0.3824°W

A4008

Location
- Country: United Kingdom
- Constituent country: England

Road network
- Roads in the United Kingdom; Motorways; A and B road zones

The A4008 is a local road in south east England.

== Route ==
It starts at Hatch End in the London Borough of Harrow at a roundabout on the A410. It runs North from the roundabout and is known as Oxhey Lane. After 1 mile (1.6 km) it passes over the route of the Grims Dyke and Grimsdyke Golf Course is to the East. Very soon afterwards it passes in to Hertfordshire. At the border a white post with the shield of London on it marks the Greater London border. There is also a plate emblazoned with the name and arms of the former county of Middlesex. In the trees to the east, a BT microwave tower may be seen.

The road continues northwards passing the estate of Carpenders Park on its western side. There is also a cemetery here. 2 miles (3.2 km) after crossing into Hertfordshire, the road enters the Borough of Watford. There is a pub, the Load of Hay on the western side and then a small green known as Watford Heath. The road swings eastwards and winds through the village of Oxhey, now a suburb of Watford. At Bushey Station, the northbound traffic runs straight on, whereas southbound traffic is via Chalk Hill and right into Aldenham Road (passing the Victoria public house at a set of traffic lights). The road has now joined the A411 and passing under Bushey Arches at a roundabout and it becomes Lower Watford High Street. On the east of the road just after the roundabout there is a metal turnpike marker with a plaque commemorating it as the last of its type.

A gyratory system takes the northbound traffic around a retail park, via Dalton Way and under Oxhey Arches. The southbound traffic is along Lower High Street. The two routes meet at a set of traffic lights and via a roundabout into Stephenson Way. On the west is a Tesco Extra supermarket, on the east is the West Coast Main Line running on an embankment between Bushey and Watford Junction. This section of the road dates from the late 1980s. On 23 January 1975, there was a train accident on this embankment and a locomotive and carriages rolled down onto what were then fields just by point at which the traffic lights mark the exit from the supermarket.

The road leaves the route of the A412 at a roundabout at the end of Stephenson Way and heads east along a link road to join the A41 and M1 at junction 5, Berrygrove. At the start of this link road the route again passes under the railway, which is carried on the Colne Viaduct. At this point, in the 1930s, an open-air pool was crafted into the course of the River Colne.

The road is some 7 miles (11 km) in length.

== History ==
The A4008 was originally numbered the B460. For a while, in the 1970s and 1980s, the route from Bushey Station to the A41 was along the Aldenham Road. This was originally the B462 and it reverted to this number after the opening of Stephenson Way and the M1 link.
