= 1838 in rail transport =

This article lists events related to rail transport that occurred in 1838.

== Events ==
=== January events ===
- January 1 – The United States government contracts with the Baltimore and Ohio Railroad to carry mail; the B&O is the first railroad to be awarded such a contract in the U.S.
- January 20 – Travelling Post Office (with sorting of mail en route) introduced on Grand Junction Railway in England, initially on an experimental basis.

=== February events ===
- February 12 – The Philadelphia, Wilmington and Baltimore Railroad (PW&B), Wilmington and Susquehanna Railroad and Baltimore and Port Deposite Rail Road merge, keeping the PW&B name.

=== March events ===
- March 28 – Jean-Claude-Républicain Arnoux applies for a patent for his train articulation system that will come to be known as the Arnoux system.

=== June events ===
- June 4 – First section of Great Western Railway of England opens from London Paddington to Maidenhead (temporary stations).
- June 18 – Newcastle and Carlisle Railway opens, the first line across England.

=== July events ===
- July 7 – An act of the United States Congress officially designates all railroads in the United States as postal routes.

=== September events ===
- September 17 – London and Birmingham Railway is opened throughout to its terminus at Curzon Street railway station, Birmingham, on completion of Kilsby Tunnel under the direction of Chief Engineer Robert Stephenson, the first trunk line in England.
- September 22 – Berlin–Potsdam Railway is opened from Berlin-Zehlendorf to Potsdam, the first railway in Prussia.

=== October events ===
- October 31 – North Union Railway in England opens from Wigan to Preston.

=== November events ===
- November 16 – Final section of Emperor Ferdinand Northern Railway (Rajhrad–Brno) in Moravia (Austrian Empire) opens for exhibition (preliminary) use.

=== Unknown date events ===
- The first "bed-carriage" (sleeping car) passenger cars are introduced on the London and Birmingham Railway and the Grand Junction Railway in England.

== Births ==
=== September births ===
- September 16 – James J. Hill, American financier who gains control of the Great Northern Railway and the Northern Pacific Railway (d. 1916).

== Deaths ==
=== September deaths ===
- Rhys Davies, British mechanical engineer who helped form Tredegar Iron Works in Richmond, Virginia.
