= Denbigh Hall railway station =

Railway station in Milton Keynes, UK

Denbigh Hall
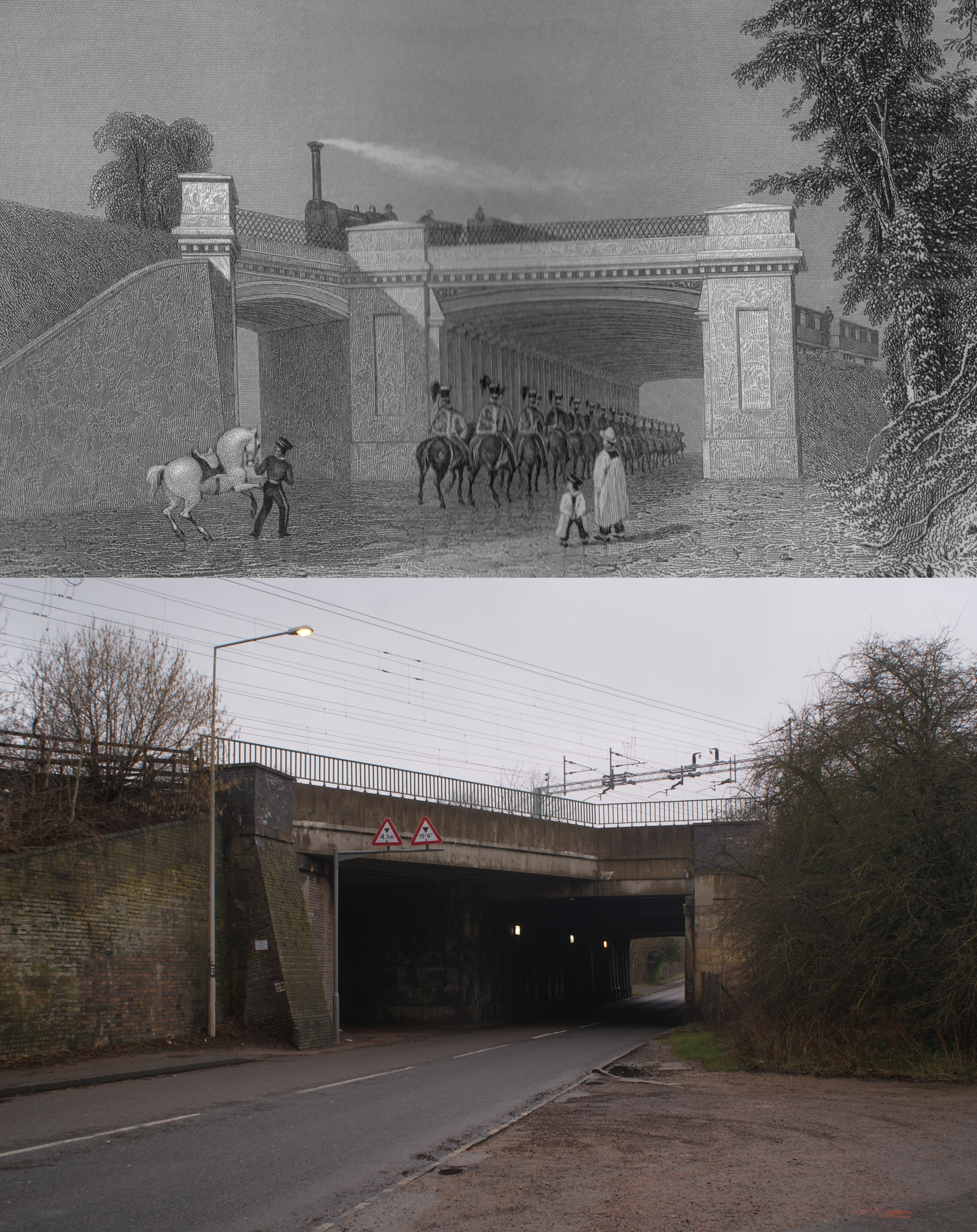
- A contemporary engraving of the Denbigh Hall railway bridge, near the site of the temporary station, with the same view taken in 2013 for comparison.

General information
- Location: Milton Keynes; England
- Coordinates: 52.010°N 0.744°W
- Grid reference: SP861354

Other information
- Status: Disused

History
- Original company: London and Birmingham Railway

Key dates
- 9 April 1838: Opened
- 17 September 1838: Closed
Route map
1837 – July 1846
Location

Denbigh Hall railway station was a temporary terminus station on the London and Birmingham Railway in the Denbigh area of what is now Milton Keynes in Buckinghamshire, England. It was open for less than six months, between April and September 1838, and was situated near a point where the railway crossed Watling Street, about 1 mile (1.6 km) north of the current location of Bletchley railway station, though Bletchley did not open until after Denbigh Hall had closed.

== History ==
The route of the London and Birmingham Railway was designed and engineered by Robert Stephenson. Two of the major civil engineering projects on the line were the six-span, 18 metres (59 ft) high Wolverton viaduct over the river Great Ouse, and the 1 mile 656 yards (2.209 km) long Kilsby Tunnel near Rugby. Work on this tunnel was prolonged, due to the builders unexpectedly encountering quicksand, and the route was not ready for the scheduled opening of the railway on 9 April 1838. (Note: Some sources state a date of 9 April 1836, however this is almost certainly incorrect.) As a temporary measure, Denbigh Hall station was built near the point where the line crossed Watling Street, allowing passengers to transfer to stage-coaches to continue their journey to Rugby station, (Note: This was not the modern station at Rugby, but another temporary station, lasting between 1838 and 1840, north-west of the current location.) also near Watling Street, a distance of approximately 37 miles (60 km). Denbigh Hall station was named after a nearby inn on Watling Street, dating from 1710. The bridge over Watling Street still survives, but has been extended as the railway has widened.

The station closed with the opening of Kilsby Tunnel on 17 September 1838, though the line still exists, forming part of the West Coast Main Line from London to Glasgow. The chord with the (much later) line from Oxford (via the Bletchley Flyover) joins the main line nearby and bears the name "Denbigh Hall Junction".

Due to the temporary nature of the station, no images of it or records of its layout are known to exist, but a contemporary engraving by George Dodgson Callow and William Radclyffe shows a train on the bridge in its immediate vicinity.

== Commemoration ==
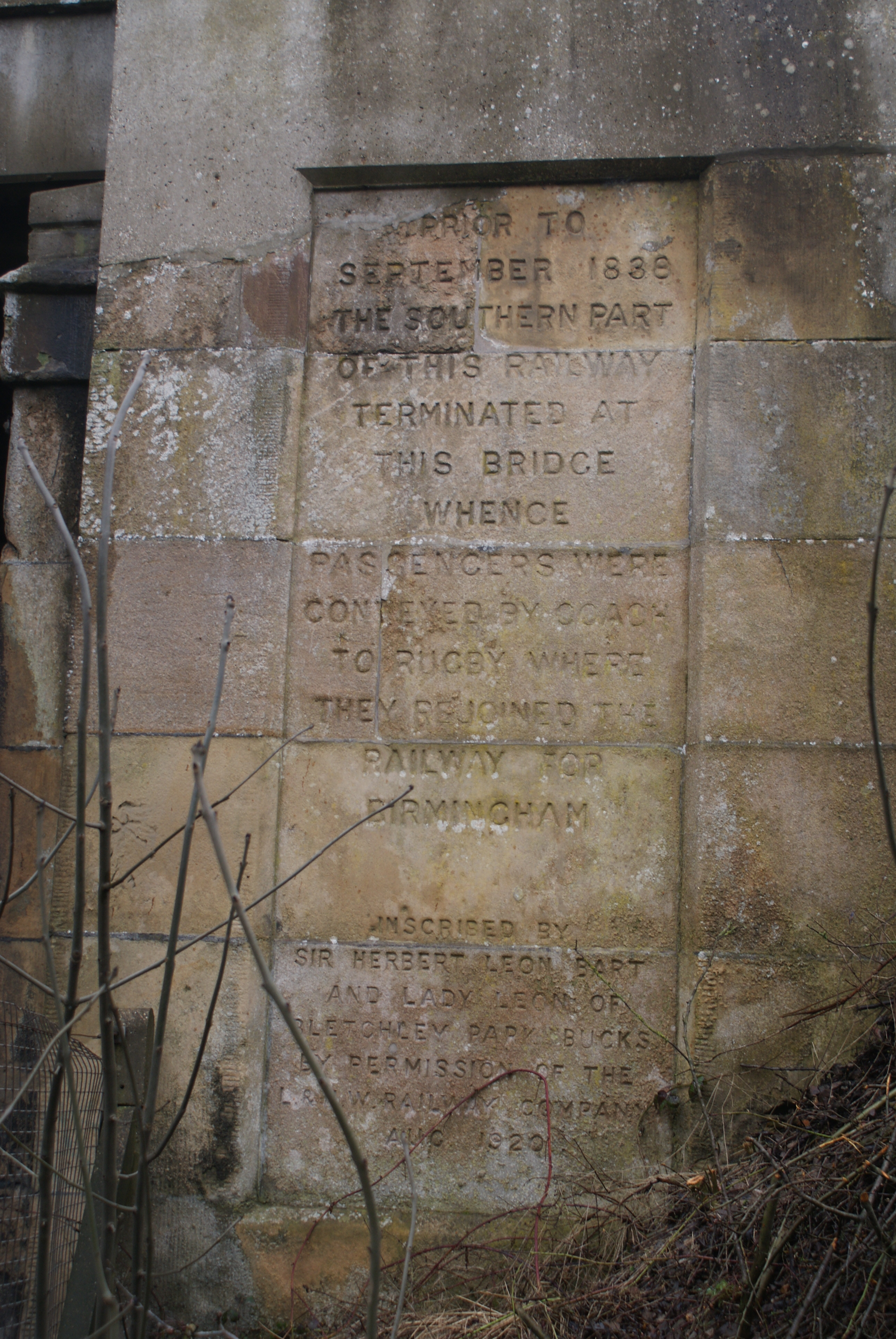
Inscription on Denbigh Hall bridge

In 1920, Herbert Leon, 1st baronet of the nearby Bletchley Park, commissioned a plaque on the bridge to commemorate the station. The plaque reads:

Prior to September 1838 the southern part of this railway terminated at this bridge whence passengers were conveyed by coach to Rugby where they rejoined the railway for Birmingham. Inscribed by Sir Herbert Leon Bart and Lady Leon of Bletchley Park Bucks. By permission of the L&NW Railway Company August 1920.

== Service summary ==
Preceding station	Historical railways	Following station
Leighton (Note: Now called Leighton Buzzard. Bletchley did not open until after Denbigh Hall had closed.); Line and station open	London and Birmingham Railway	Rugby; By stagecoach

== See also ==
- 1838 in rail transport

== Bibliography ==
- Butt, R. V. J. (October 1995). The Directory of Railway Stations: details every public and private passenger station, halt, platform and stopping place, past and present (1st ed.). Sparkford: Patrick Stephens Ltd. ISBN 978-1-85260-508-7. OCLC 60251199. OL 11956311M.
- Dewick, Tony (2002). Complete Atlas of Railway Station Names (1st ed.). Hersham: Ian Allan Publishing Ltd. ISBN 0-7110-2798-6.
- Roscoe, Thomas; Lecount, Peter (c. 1838). The London and Birmingham Railway.
- Yonge, John (2005). Gerald Jacobs (ed.). Railway Track Diagrams - Book 4: Midlands & North West (Quail Track Plans) (2nd ed.). Bradford on Avon: Trackmaps (formerly Quail Map Co.). ISBN 0-9549-8660-1. OCLC 133041211.
