= Denbigh Hall railway bridge =

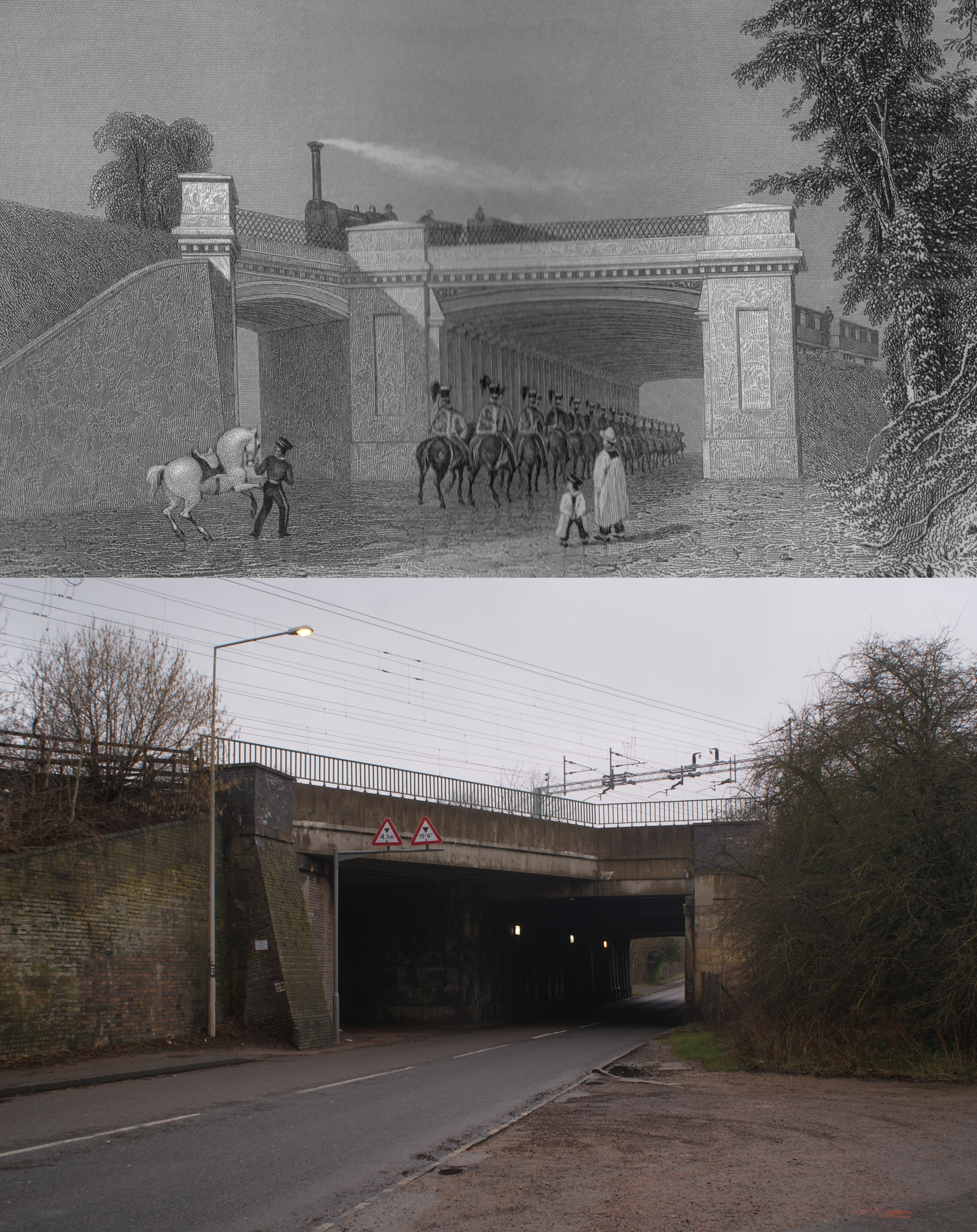
- The bridge in 1838 (top) and 2013 (bottom)
- Coordinates: 52°00′34″N 0°44′37″W
- Carries: West Coast Main Line
- Crosses: Watling Street
- Locale: Bletchley, Milton Keynes, England
- Maintained by: Network Rail
- Heritage status: Grade II listed building

Characteristics
- Material: Cast iron, reinforced concrete
- No. of spans: 1

History
- Opened: 1837

Location
- Interactive map of Denbigh Hall railway bridge

Denbigh Hall railway bridge carries the West Coast Main Line railway across Watling Street just north of Bletchley, Milton Keynes, in southern England. It dates from the opening of the London and Birmingham Railway in 1838 and was designed by Robert Stephenson though it has been heavily modified. It is a Grade II listed building.

== Design ==
The bridge is of an unusual design. It is an acutely skewed, cast-iron arch. The deck girders are at right angles to the track. It has a width of 165 feet (50 metres) and a square plan of 26 feet 9 inches (8.15 metres) between broad buttress walls in brick with stone abutments. The original curved cast-iron girders were replaced with straight ones when the line was quadruple-tracked in 1892 and again in 1946, the second time with reinforced concrete beams. The decorative ironwork, including the latticed parapet over the road, was preserved. The alterations and surviving original parts demonstrate all four construction techniques for such bridges developed during the bridge's lifetime.

== History ==
Robert Stephenson, the chief engineer of the London and Birmingham Railway surveyed the route and designed the bridge. The bridge crosses Watling Street, an historical route north-west from London, at Denbigh Hall. The area is now an industrial zone on the outskirts of Milton Keynes but in the 1830s was largely open land with an inn which served as a stopping point for stagecoaches on the Holyhead Road. The road was part of Thomas Telford's A5 road when the bridge was built but has since been bypassed. The London and Birmingham Railway opened in April 1838 but construction difficulties at Kilsby Tunnel to the north meant the line could not open as a through route. For the first five months, trains from London terminated at Denbigh Hall station, adjacent to the bridge; passengers were transferred to stagecoaches which took them to Rugby, where they resumed their journeys by train. The full route opened in September 1838 and the station closed. A plaque on the south-east side of the bridge records the temporary station's role.

The bridge was designated a Grade II listed building in 1975. Listed status provides legal protection against unauthorised modification or demolition and recognises structures of historical or architectural interest.
