= Watford Tunnels =

Pair of railway tunnels in Hertfordshire, England

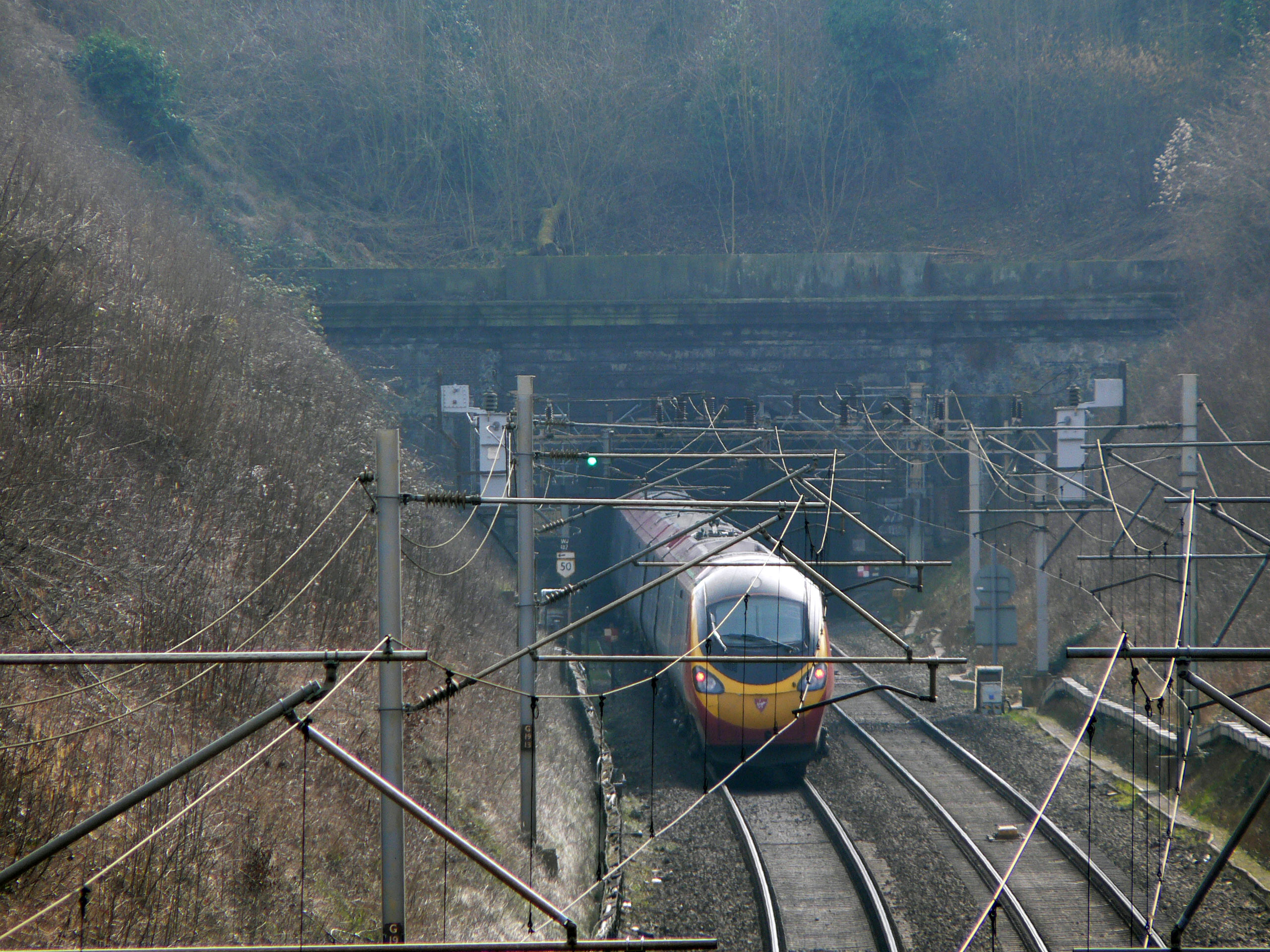
- The south portal of the new tunnel
- Interactive map of Watford Tunnels

Overview
- Line: West Coast Main Line
- Location: Watford, England
- Coordinates: 51.681507°N 0.419055°W

Operation
- Opened: 1837
- Owner: Network Rail
- Character: railway tunnel

Technical
- Design engineer: Robert Stephenson
- Length: 1 mile 55 yards (1.7 km)
- No. of tracks: 4

Watford Tunnels are a pair of railway tunnels on the West Coast Main Line just north-west of Watford in Hertfordshire, Eastern England. The original was built in 1837 for the London and Birmingham Railway to the design of Robert Stephenson and is just over a mile (1.6 kilometres) long. When the line was widened in the 1870s, a second tunnel was built just to the east. Both tunnels had decorative portals and the south portal of the original tunnel is a Grade II listed building.

== Construction ==
Robert Stephenson, the chief engineer of the London and Birmingham Railway, first planned to take the line further west but the Earl of Clarendon, owner of Cassiobury House, refused to allow the railway to cross his land (now part of Cassiobury Park). Thus, Stephenson was forced to take a more difficult route to the east through a patch of high ground which required a sequence of cuttings, embankments, and a tunnel.

Material excavated to build the tunnel and cuttings was reused for the nearby embankments. Construction did not proceed smoothly. All digging was done by hand except for some use of explosives in troublesome patches. The majority of the tunnel's route is through chalk but test bores missed a patch of gravel and sand which workers struck while digging. The result was a partial collapse, inundating the tunnel and killing ten workers. A hole dug from the top of the hill to retrieve the bodies was later converted into a ventilation shaft. Watford was the only tunnel on the London and Birmingham where the contractor was able to complete the works without the railway company's direct intervention (in several other cases contractors ran out of money before completing the works) and was relatively simple in comparison to other tunnels on the route such as Primrose Hill Tunnel shortly after leaving London and Kilsby Tunnel, the last major tunnel before Birmingham. Supporting arches, which had not been budgeted or planned for, were required along their lengths to resist the pressure of the surrounding earth but at Watford the surrounding chalk was strong enough that no such arches were needed.

== Description ==
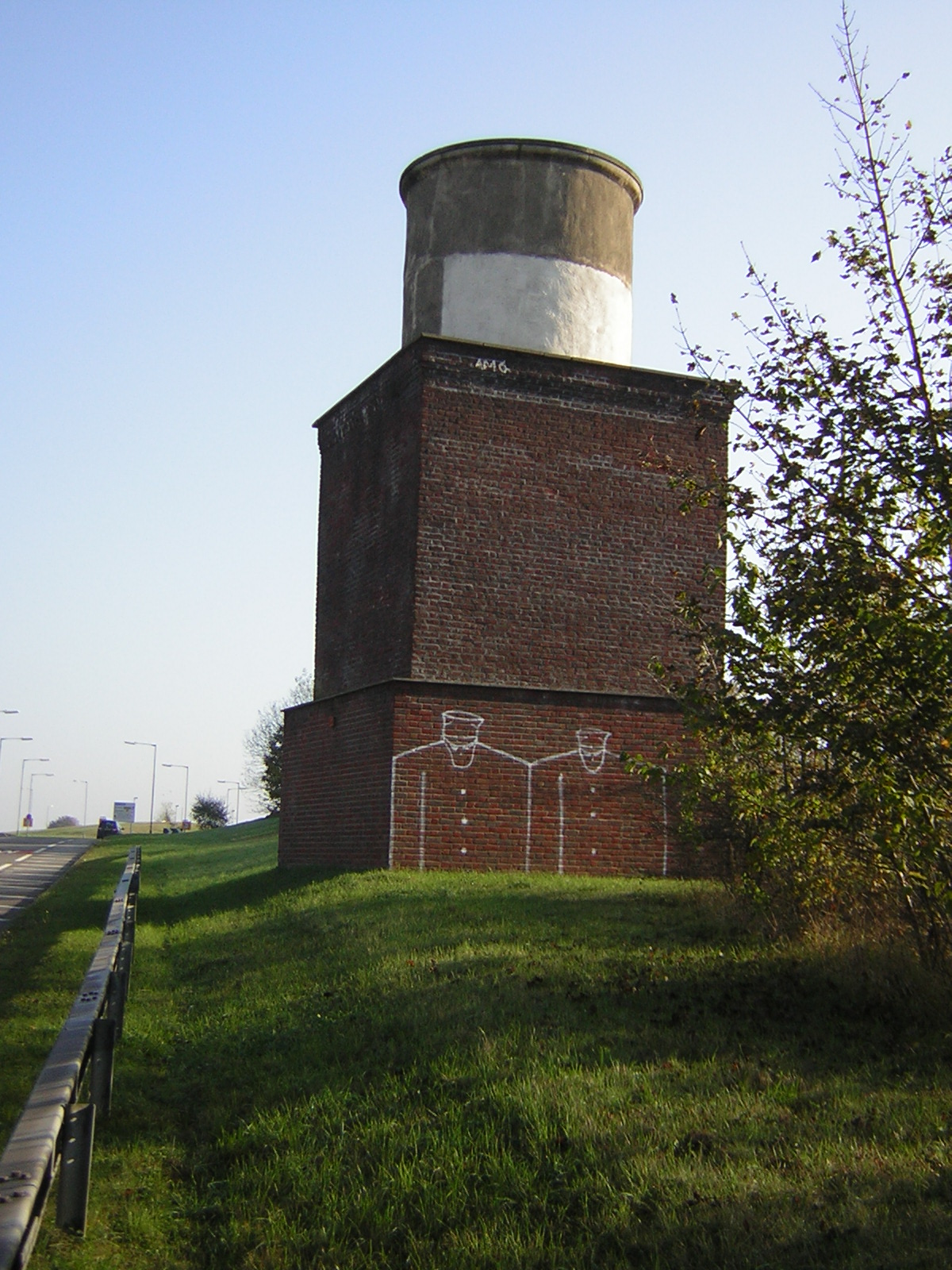
Ventilation shaft for the Watford North Tunnels, seen from the A41 road

The original tunnel is 1 mile 55 yards (1.7 kilometres) long and was built to carry two tracks. It is 24 feet (7.3 metres) wide, 25 feet (7.6 metres) tall, and lined with red brick. It has ornamental portals at each end in the form of rusticated ashlar arches with decorative voussoirss and a large pediment. It has a ventilation shaft near the centre.

When the railway line was triple-tracked in 1858, a third track was laid between the existing two tracks. The line was quadruple-tracked in the 1870s which required the construction of a parallel tunnel and accompanying cuttings to the east of the existing one. The new tunnel opened in 1874. It again had decorative portals, though plainer than the original. They again took the form of arches but this time in brick. The railway historian Gordon Biddle considered the newer portals to have a "fortress-like appearance [...] in strong contrast to its delicately classical neighbour".

The tunnels now have two lines each.

== History ==
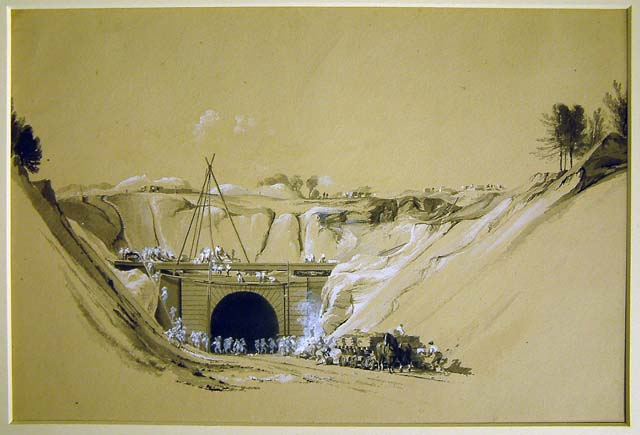
Original wash drawing by John Cooke Bourne, after which his lithograph was made

John Cooke Bourne illustrated the construction of the original tunnel in his series of lithographs, published to mark the opening of the London and Birmingham Railway. Its modern appearance has changed little from Bourne's drawing. The lithograph depicts the south face of the tunnel during the final stages of construction and horses carting spoil away through the cutting. Matt Thompson of the Ironbridge Gorge Museum Trust described the scene as showing the scale of the engineering work—"In places, the building of the railway reshaped the landscape and Bourne is at pains to demonstrate how big an undertaking this was".

The south portal of the original tunnel was designated a Grade II listed building in 1983, a status which provides legal protection from unauthorised demolition or modification in recognition of historic and architectural value.

In 2016, a landslip affected the east cutting walls causing debris to wash onto the track. A southbound train entering the tunnel struck the debris and derailed inside the mouth of the tunnel before being struck a glancing blow by another train travelling in the opposite direction. Both trains had to be evacuated and several passengers sustained minor injuries.
