= Denbigh, Milton Keynes =

District of Milton Keynes, England

Coordinates: 52.0043°N 0.7268°W

Denbigh
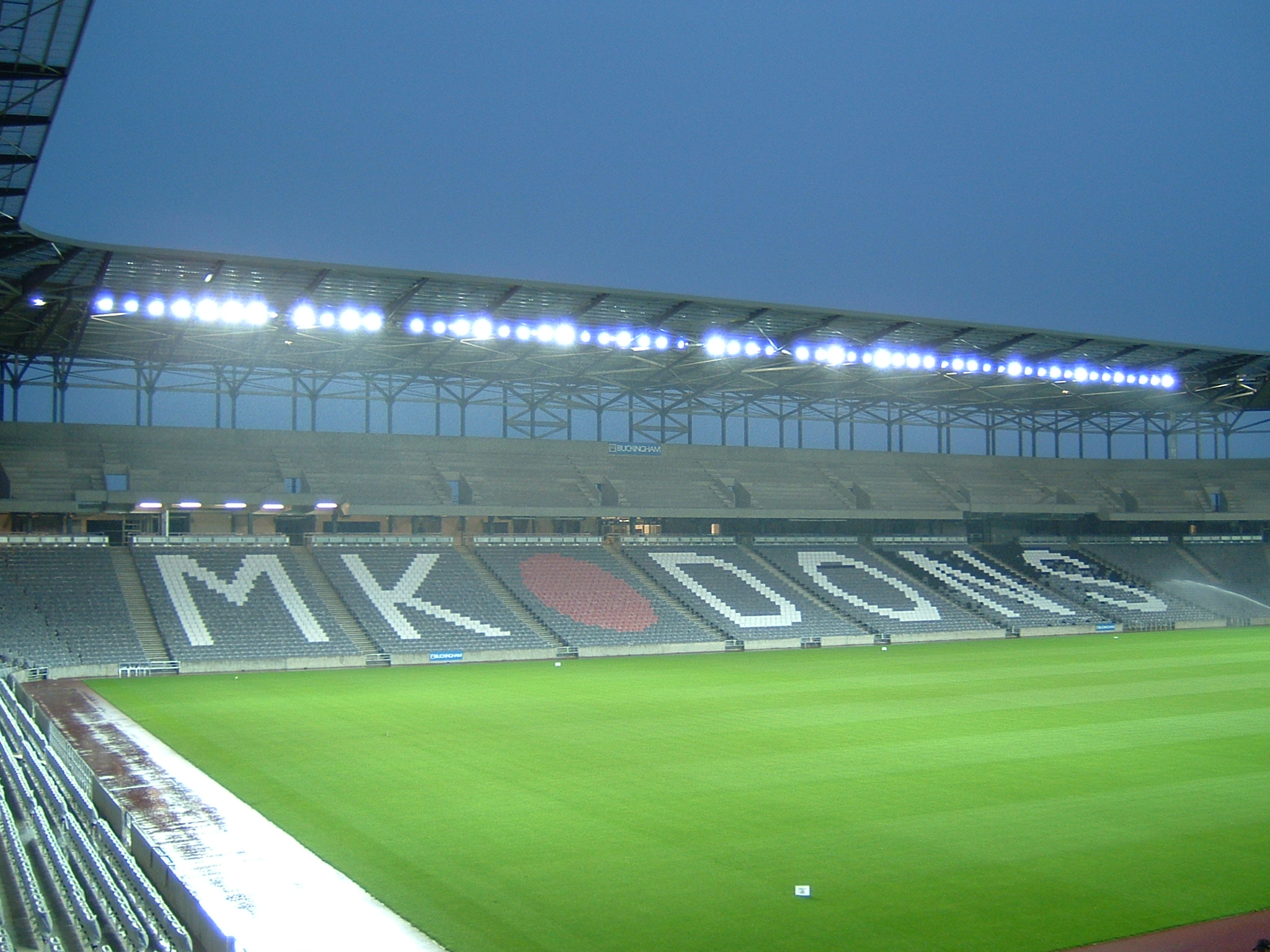
- The East Stand of the 30,000 seater Stadium MK

- Location within Buckinghamshire
- Interactive map of Denbigh
- OS grid reference: SP874347
- Civil parish: Bletchley and Fenny Stratford
- District: City of Milton Keynes
- Unitary authority: Milton Keynes City Council
- Ceremonial county: Buckinghamshire
- Region: South East
- Country: England
- Sovereign state: United Kingdom
- Post town: MILTON KEYNES
- Postcode district: MK1
- Dialling code: 01908
- Police: Thames Valley
- Fire: Buckinghamshire
- Ambulance: South Central
- UK Parliament: Buckingham and Bletchley

Denbigh is a district in Milton Keynes, Buckinghamshire, England, to the north of Fenny Stratford and on the eastern side of the West Coast Main Line (and on the opposite side to the rest of Bletchley). It is in the civil parish of Bletchley and Fenny Stratford and is categorised by the Office for National Statistics as part of the Bletchley built-up area. (Note: The Bletchley built-up sub-area is that part of Milton Keynes that is west of the A5 and south of the A421.) The A5 forms its eastern and northern boundary; parts of Bletcham Way and Saxon St form its southern boundary. The overall district has five sub districts, divided by Watling St/Denbigh Rd, the 'uptick' of Bletcham Way and Grafton Street, and Saxon Street northbound. The district names are planning designations that have persisted without ever being changed to the style "North Denbigh" etc. as is the norm elsewhere in Britain.

These lands to the east of Watling Street were originally in the manor of Simpson.

== Denbigh North ==
This district, next to the junction of the A5 with the A421, includes the 30,500 all-seater Stadium MK for Milton Keynes Dons F.C. as well as a hotel and retail outlets.

The football stadium hosted its first match in July 2007. and was ready for the start of the 2007/08 season. It was formally opened on 29 November 2007 by Queen Elizabeth II. A plan to use a space beside the stadium as an arena for professional basketball fell through but, in September 2018, Marshall Amplification announced a naming agreement with Arena MK (at Stadium MK) to use the space for music events and rename it as the Marshall Arena. Major retailers include an Asda supercentre and IKEA superstore, with smaller shops in the MK1 Shopping Park. The superstores were open for business by the end of 2005.

The first units of the MK1 Shopping Park, constructed after the Asda and IKEA development, include a McDonald's and KFC on the Saxon Street side of the stadium, with a DW Sports Fitness centre on the Grafton Street side of the stadium.

The main retail centre of the MK1 Shopping Park opened in December 2012, which comprises Marks & Spencer, Outfit (previously BHS), H&M, New Look, Next, Primark and River Island which opened sites in the shopping park. The latter was developed adjacent to Stadium MK by InterMK and The Crown Estate. InterMK is owned by Pete Winkelman, chairman of the MK Dons.

The development also includes a newer leisure facility and cinema complex directly behind the stadium, comprising an Odeon IMAX Cinema, Nandos, Bella Italia, TGI Fridays, Prezzo and Frankie and Benny's which opened in late February/early March 2015.

The MK1 Shopping Park expanded once again, constructing a new five-unit development in the space between the original shopping park and the newer cinema complex. This comprises, at its opening, a JD Sports, Carphone Warehouse and Card Factory. This opened in early December 2017.

The hotel is a DoubleTree by Hilton Worldwide, part of the stadium complex.

The development is on the former site of 'Denbigh Sports Ground' and 'Denbigh North Leisure', an entertainment complex which was home to the Sanctuary Music Arena.

== Denbigh West ==
Denbigh West is an employment area, best known as the home of Marshall Amplification. It is on the east side of Watling Street, west of Saxon Street..

== Denbigh East ==
Denbigh East is another employment area, east of Saxon Street and west of the Grand Union canal.

== Mount Farm ==
This district is an industrial/employment area. The Milton Keynes central sorting office was here, with the post-code MK1 1AA. Many internet mapping sites assumed that this meant that it is the centre of Milton Keynes and mark it according. It is actually about three miles south of Central Milton Keynes (which has the MK9 postcode).

== Granby ==
This is a small area, just north of the stadium. It is mainly industrial, but includes a mosque and a small, council housing block.

The district takes its name from the original Marquis of Granby inn nearby, as described next.

== Denbigh Hall ==
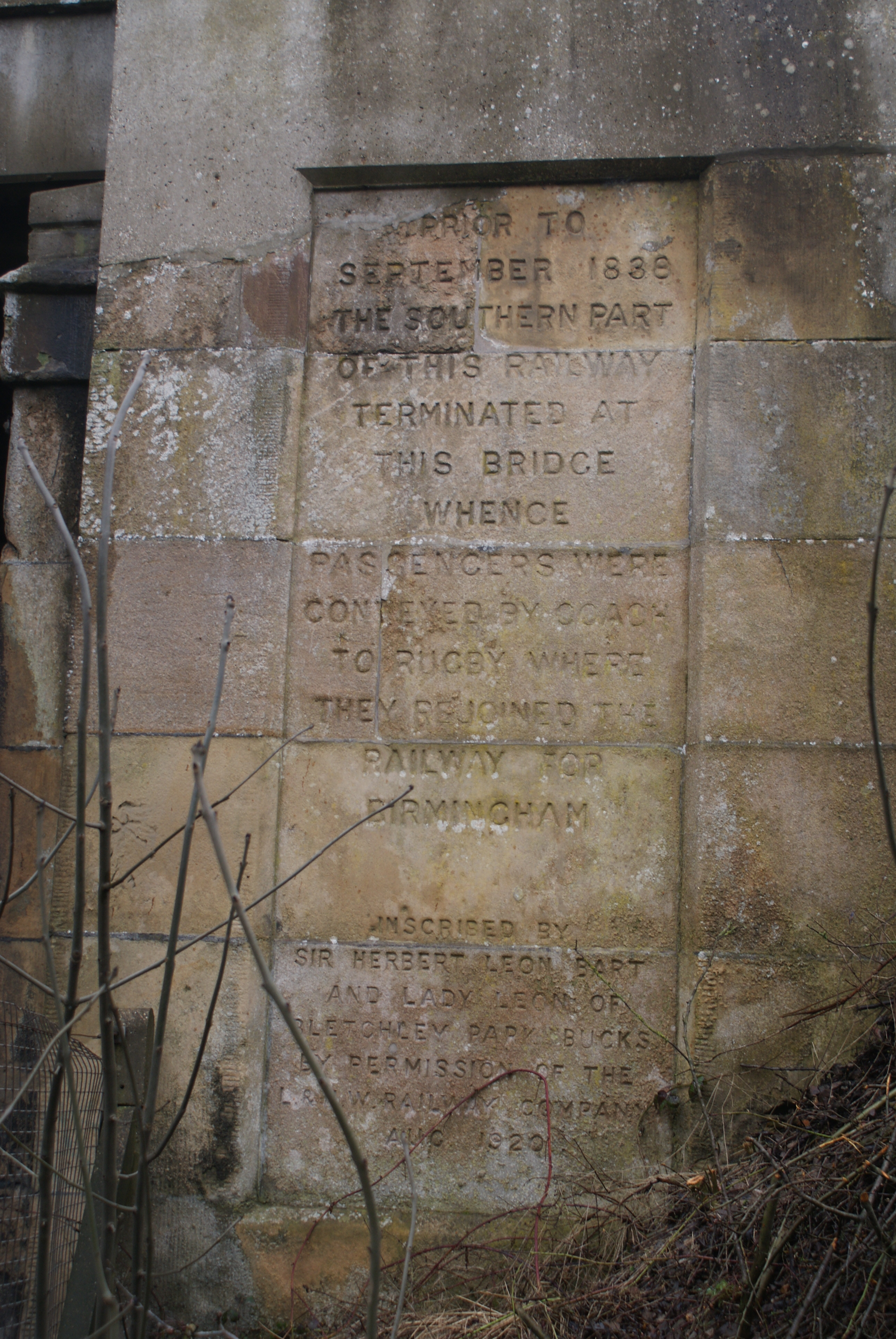
Inscription on Denbigh Hall railway bridge

The modern industrial district called Denbigh Hall is in West Bletchley rather than in Denbigh, but it gave rise to the name Denbigh. A local heritage map shows that it lies on the site of 'Denbigh Farm' It is separated from Denbigh by Watling Street.

The original Denbigh Hall was an inn on Watling Street, dating from 1710. Family recollections say that it had previously been known as 'the Marquis of Granby' but that it had changed its name in the eighteenth century when the sixth Earl of Denbigh stopped there overnight and was made so comfortable that he declared it his half-way house to London. The inn no longer exists; its site is shown on the 1885 Ordnance Survey as just north of the bridge 158 where the West Coast Main Line crosses Watling Street. A third tale relates that the nobleman was given an axe when he asked for a bill. The same map shows a large private house, 'Denbigh Hall', to the south-east of the inn – its site is approximately at the junction of Whaddon Way with Melrose Avenue.

Network Rail continues to use this name (Denbigh Hall) for its marshalling yards north of Bletchley railway station, near the site of the inn. The West Coast Main Line bridge (number 158) over Watling Street near here bears a plaque that explains that the first phase of the London and Birmingham Railway line terminated here, at Denbigh Hall station. At this point, passengers transferred to coaches for onward transfer by road to Rugby and thence by rail to Birmingham.

== See also ==
- Denbigh School (which is in the nearby Shenley Church End district).
