= Primrose Hill Tunnel =

Railway tunnel in England

Coordinates: 51°32′32″N 00°10′10″W

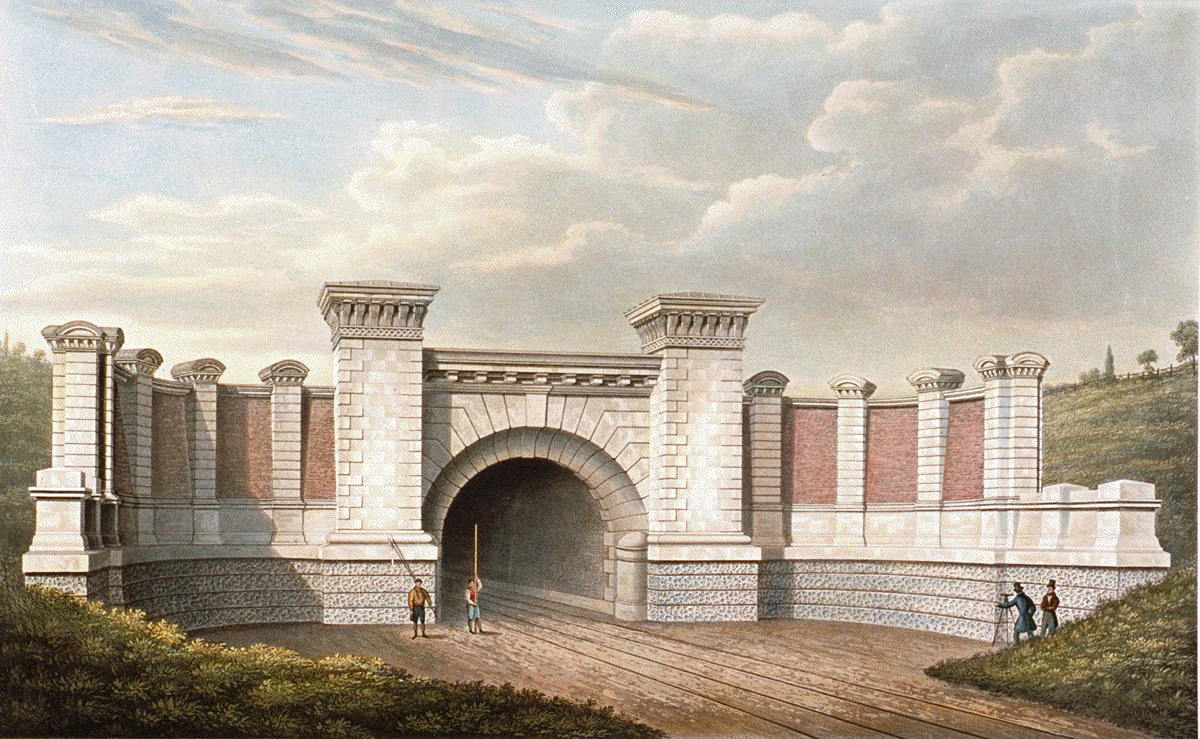
- 1837 watercolour engraving of the eastern portal before duplication
- Interactive map of Primrose Hill Tunnel

Overview
- Line: West Coast Main Line
- Location: Primrose Hill, Camden, London, England
- System: National Rail

Operation
- Work began: 1834
- Opened: 1838
- Owner: Network Rail

Technical
- Design engineer: Robert Stephenson and William Budden
- Length: 1,164 yards (1,064 m)
- No. of tracks: Double track in each bore
- Track gauge: Standard gauge
- Electrified: 25 kV AC OHLE

Listed Building – Grade II
- Official name: Primrose Hill Tunnels (Western Entrance)
- Designated: 14 May 1974
- Reference no.: 1246989

Listed Building – Grade II*
- Official name: Primrose Hill Tunnels (Eastern Portals)
- Designated: 14 May 1974
- Reference no.: 1329904

Primrose Hill Tunnel is a 1,164-yard (1,064 m) railway tunnel on the West Coast Main Line, approximately 2 miles (3.2 km) from Euston station. It is located in South Hampstead in the London Borough of Camden, just north of Primrose Hill park and consists of two bores: the slow line to the northern side, driven through the London clay by the engineer Robert Stephenson for the London and Birmingham Railway in 1838, and the fast line to its south, added by the London and North Western Railway in 1879. The original tunnel's Italianate portals were designed by William Budden and later replicated for the fast line. The western portals have been listed at Grade II and the eastern at Grade II* since 1974.

As the first railway tunnel in London, Historic England considers it to be of special historic interest, as well as because "it was the first nationally to negotiate the issue of competing claims for the use of land in an urban context; and the first tunnel to treat one of its portals architecturally".

== Description ==
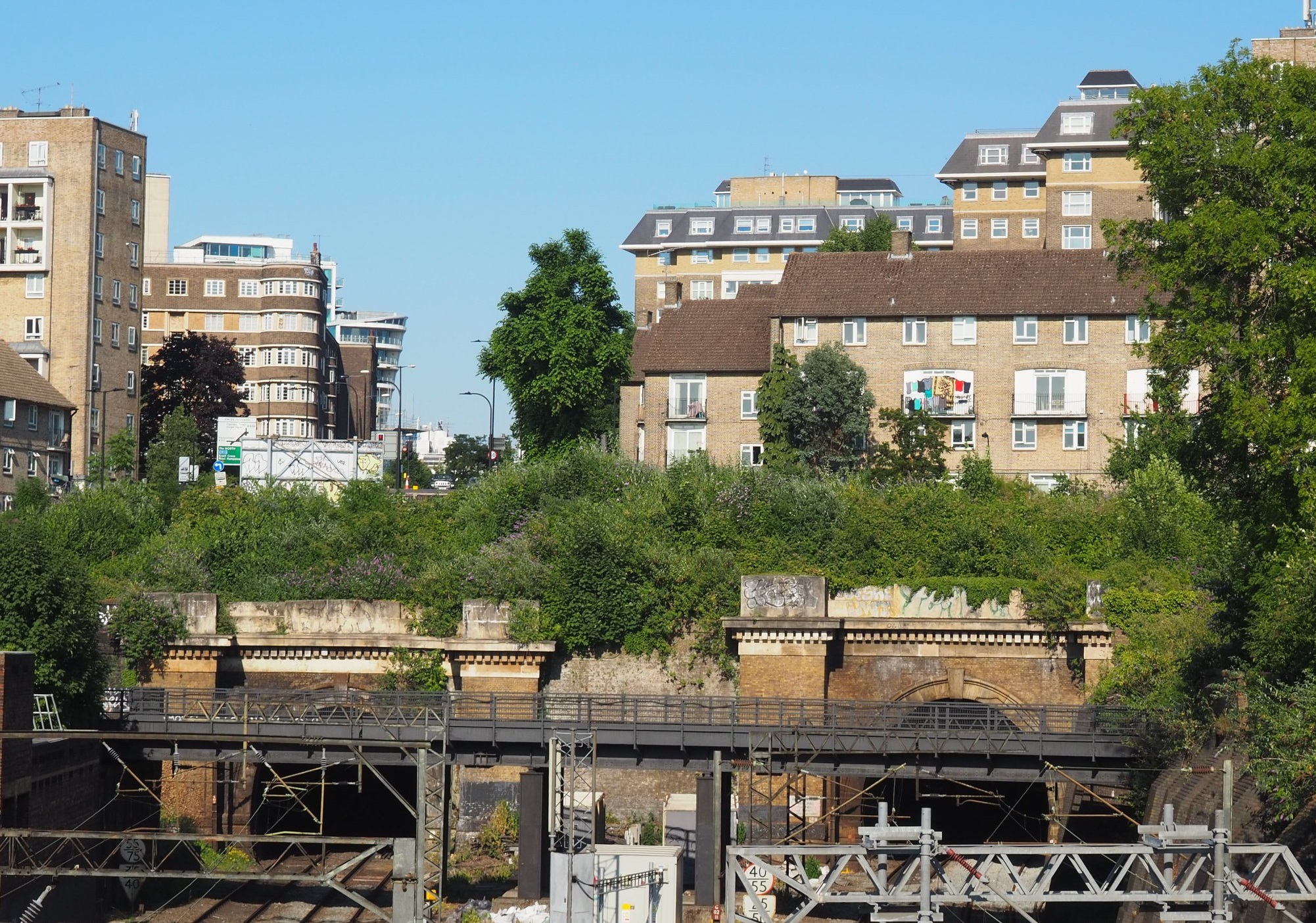
The western portals at South Hampstead station

Primrose Hill Tunnel's environmental context has transformed substantially, now obscured by fences, buildings and vegetation, yet the structures remain almost unchanged from when first built, aside from the duplication from single to twin portals. The eastern portals are grand and heavy, built of Portland stone and London stock brick. The arches of the tunnel mouths have concave surrounds of rusticated voussoirs, and are topped with a projecting cornice with carved lion masks. Surrounding the portals are large stone piers topped with bracketed hipped capitals, and curved flanking wing walls divided into brick-filled panels by stone pillars with semicircular pediments. The eastern portals evoke the style of Italianate villas, bringing, as owner Eton College hoped, a certain dramatic grace to Primrose Hill.

The tunnel portals at the western end are humble in relation to the eastern ones. They are hard to see other than from the bridge carrying the Chiltern Main Line from Marylebone, which was inserted across the LNWR line by the Great Central Railway in 1899, obscuring the western portals. Their arches are round with coved reveals of rusticated voussoirs and keystones crowned by a dentilled cornice, and large stone flanking piers on vermiculated stone pedestals.

Two airshafts remain to ventilate the tunnels: one at the midpoint of the 1838 tunnel in the Marriott Hotel's car park, and a brick shaft for the 1879 tunnel in the back garden of 10 Wadham Gardens.

== History ==
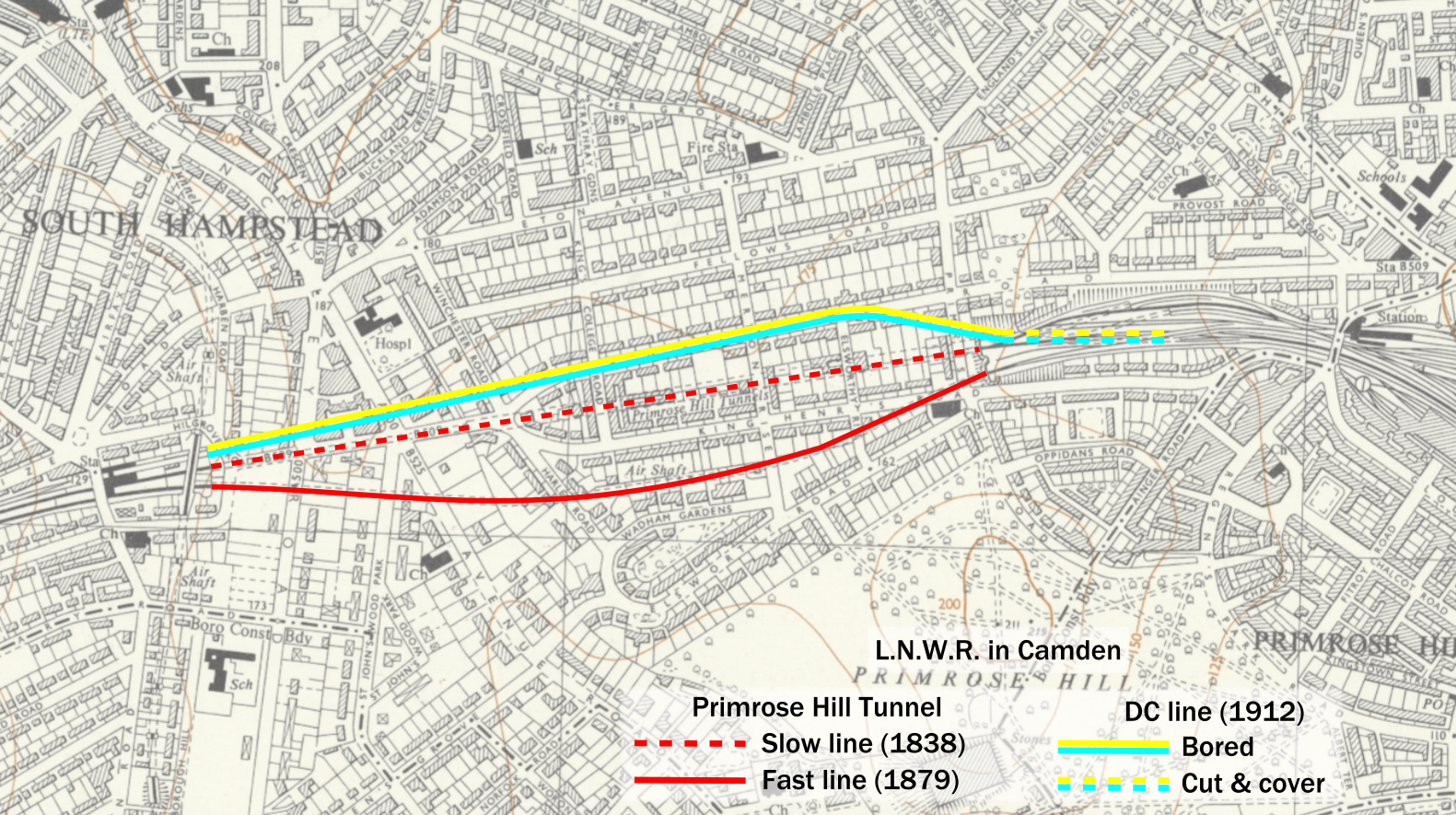
Diagram of the two Primrose Hill bores and the later Watford DC line single-track tunnels to their north

Construction of the London and Birmingham Railway (L&BR) began in 1833, one of the first inter-city lines after the success of the Liverpool and Manchester Railway. Choosing a route to Birmingham Curzon Street out of Euston station was its chief engineer Robert Stephenson, who needed to pass through South Hampstead, a rural area which was starting to be developed concurrently with the railway's arrival. Though the topography of the land, known as the Chalcots Estate, did not strictly require a tunnel, it was constructed at the insistence of the landowner, Eton College. Negotiations began in 1831 between the L&BR and Eton, which firstly opposed the railway cutting, principally for the reason that it would reduce the value of land and leases on the route. Though the L&BR was able to persuade Eton that the railway would be quiet and carefully fenced, it agreed to place the line in a tunnel to prevent further obstruction.

For the London and Birmingham Railway Act 1833 (3 & 4 Will. 4. c. xxxvi) which authorised the railway, Eton was able to require certain conditions regarding the tunnel's engineering and appearance, including that it must be strong enough to erect buildings on top of, and therefore be bored rather than use cut-and-cover (the fact that a tunnel would preserve valuable building land being its main advantage); the other main stipulation was that "the mouth of the tunnel at the eastern end shall be made good and finished with a substantial and ornamental facing of brickwork or masonry to the satisfaction of the Provost and College." This resulted in a grand eastern portal costing £7,000 (equivalent to £680,000 in 2025), sympathetic to the upmarket development planned for the Chalcots Estate, and is the reason for the less spectacular western portal.

Both east and west portals were designed by William Budden, an assistant engineer to Stephenson, who is unknown for any other works. The prestige of this commission for a non-established architect is unusual; the classical architect Philip Hardwick was the L&BR's company architect and designed the nearby terminus at Euston.

=== Construction ===
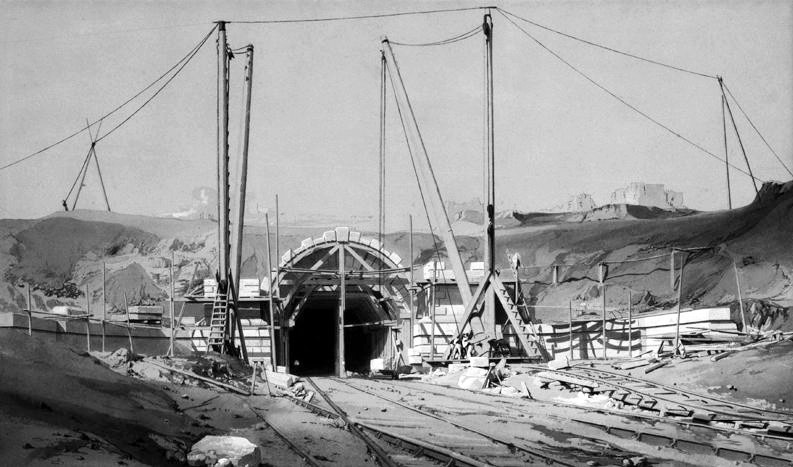
Primrose Hill Tunnel under construction in April 1837, a watercolour engraving by John Cooke Bourne

The contract for the 6-mile (9.7 km) section of line including Primrose Hill was let on 21 April 1834 for £120,000 (equivalent to £13,490,000 in 2025). Excavation of Primrose Hill Tunnel began that year by the contractors Jackson and Sheddon, using four 8 ft (2.4 m) vertical shafts to access working faces, with the cut-and-cover method used for about 21 yd (19 m) at each end of the tunnel.

The tunnelling was fraught with difficulties, arising from nature of the London clay through which it was being driven. Although bringing the advantage of being impermeable and keeping the work free from water, it is a tough material and was difficult to remove with the existing technology of spades, pickaxes and blasting, instead requiring crosscut saws and hatchets and increasing the expense, but the pressure of the clay also caused it to expand upon excavation and exposure to the atmosphere, necessitating additional unusual measures. Firstly, an extra-thick brick lining of 27 inches (690 mm) was installed as the contractors went along, to hold back the pressure, and very strong timbering was needed to support the arches until a brickwork section was complete to prevent collapses. Also, excavation was not allowed to advance more than about 9 ft (2.7 m) beyond the completed lining.

Another problem due to the expansivity of the moist clay was that it would force the mortar from between the joints of the brick lining, leading to shrinkage of the tunnel's dimension as the bricks came into contact and broke under the pressure. For a short period, Stephenson was apprehensive that stress could cause the brickwork to cave in altogether, as it made small fragments fly off the facing and coat his clothing while he inspected the work. The solution was found in using very hard paver bricks in place of hollow London stock brick, and in the substitution of lime mortar with Roman cement, which would harden before the pressure became great enough to force the bricks into contact.

Jackson and Sheddon, the contractors, had become bankrupt in late 1834, leaving the railway company obliged to assume responsibility for the work. Robert Stephenson, as chief engineer, appointed John Cass Birkinshaw, an assistant engineer, to take over supervision of the contractors' section, including the tunnel.

In 1835, before it was completed, the tunnel received a special visit from a party of doctors for the L&BR to obtain their professional opinions on the "effect of such a tunnel on the health and feelings", due to the unease felt by prospective travellers in their ignorance regarding railway tunnels, of which Primrose Hill was the first in London. All four doctors, whom included William Lawrence, John Ayrton Paris and Thomas Watson, signed their names to confirm that even with a locomotive letting off steam, the tunnel remained unaffected, dry and at an agreeable temperature. They also traversed it in a carriage and found it no different to travelling in a coach down a narrow street at night and with no noise to prevent easy conversation. In fact, they were firm that the dangers of passing through well-constructed tunnels were no greater than those of travelling on an open railway, and the company used this to set the public's mind at rest.

Completion of the tunnel was delayed by poor weather in addition to the engineering problems related to the London clay. By January 1837, Primrose Hill Tunnel was eventually completed, with the 6-mile (9.7 km) section of line that had originally been let at £120,000 costing more than double at £280,000 (equivalent to £31,470,000 in 2025).

=== After opening ===
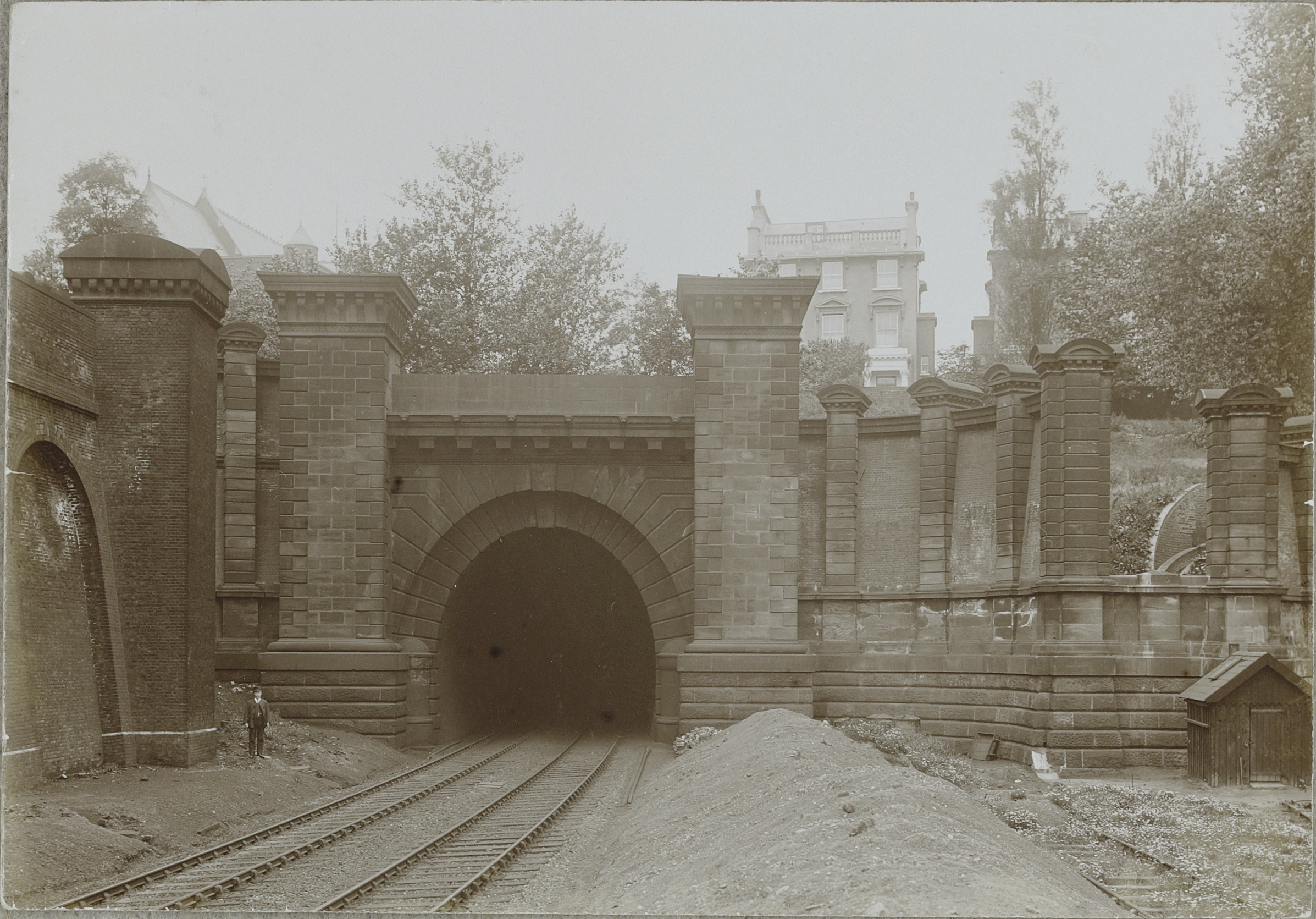
A photograph of the 1879 eastern portal in c.1910, showing fast line and retaining wall

Being the first railway tunnel in London, Primrose Hill attracted crowds of people to watch its construction, and watch the trains operating through it once opened. Contemporary prints show the embankment by the eastern portal with crowds of sightseers. The sides of the cuttings at each end were open and unobscured, allowing views down to the portals. Development of houses on King Henry's Road soon hemmed it in and prevented this popular public attraction.

By 1852 the London and North Western Railway, which had amalgamated from the L&BR, was experiencing rising pressure on this section of line and at Euston, and began to advocate for a second bore at Primrose Hill Tunnel to double the number of tracks. This work was ultimately carried out in 1879, with the main line becoming four-tracked between London and Watford. The new bore, which features a sharp curve southwards and now forms the fast line for express services, was designed by the LNWR's chief engineer, William Baker, with portals which faithfully replicate the detailed decorative design of the originals, though taller due to a need to retain the rising land of Primrose Hill itself.

A pair of new, separate tunnels to the north were built by the LNWR in 1912 for the Watford DC line, allowing capacity for electrified suburban commuter services. These are currently operated by London Overground and call at South Hampstead, just beyond the western portal.

On 14 May 1974, the Royal Commission on the Historical Monuments of England awarded the portals at both ends the status of listed structures, in separate listings – the eastern portals at Grade II* (particularly important buildings of more than special interest), and the western portals are Grade II (special interest). HE noted that the comparison of east and west emphasises the exceptional circumstances at the eastern end of the tunnel where the Eton College Estate demanded a grand architectural set-piece. In its summary of importance, HE considers the eastern portal to be of more than special architectural interest for its proud, classical elevation which is indicative of the upmarket development the College hoped to undertake nearby; and that there are similarities in design with Brunel's portals to the Box Tunnel in the use of ashlar to imply strength, the classical features such as the treatment of the cornices and rusticated quoins, and the employment of quadrant arches to convey the sense of a grand entrance.

== See also ==
Other L&BR tunnels:

- Watford Tunnels, Hertfordshire
- Kilsby Tunnel, Northamptonshire
