= Jean-Claude-Républicain Arnoux =

French civil engineer

- Born: 16 December 1792; Le Cateau-Cambrésis
- Died: 1866 (age 74)
- Education: École polytechnique
- Known for: Arnoux system of rail carriage articulation
- Scientific career
- Fields: Civil engineer, entrepreneur, inventor

Jean-Claude-Républicain Arnoux (Le Cateau-Cambrésis 16 December 1792 – 1866) was a French civil engineer known for his invention of the Arnoux system for articulating trains on tight curves. As an entrepreneur he founded and directed the Compagnie de Paris à Orsay, which constructed and operated the line from Paris to Orsay and is now part of the Ligne de Sceaux. It opened on 6 June 1846.

== Biography ==
Jean-Claude-Républicain Arnoux was born at Le Cateau-Cambrésis in the Nord department of France on 16 December 1792. His father was a postmaster. In 1811 he entered the École polytechnique and became a lieutenant in the Artillery under the French First Empire, before being decommissioned on 16 July 1815.

He became an administrator for Laffitte et Caillard, a Messageries Générales company (courier service), supervising a workshop for the construction of stagecoaches and cargo vehicles.

Between 1845 and 1852 he built the rail line from Paris to Strasbourg, after doing scientific research at the École Centrale. In 1838 he published essays concerning his system for carriages on large curves. On 9 March 1841 he made a proposal for a railway from Paris to Meaux, although it was not enacted.

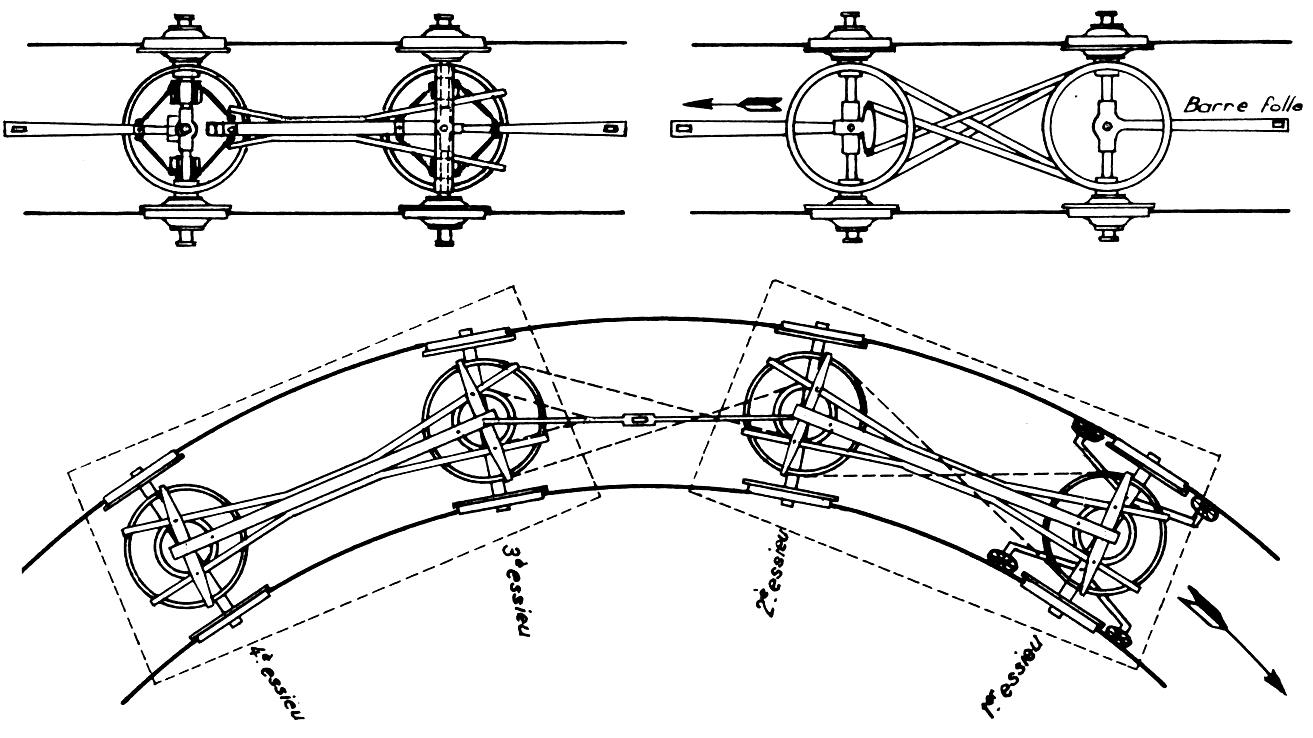
Diagram of the Arnoux System

He is best known as the inventor of the Arnoux system (French: système ferroviaire dit Arnoux), which was used on the first Ligne de Sceaux on 6 June 1846. This system used trains with articulated axles, such that the movements of the axles were guided by chains and pulleys, so that they could negotiate tight curves at high speed. He won the Grand Prix de Mécanique de l'Institut from the French Academy of Sciences in 1839.

By an Order of 6 September 1844 he won the operator's concession for the Ligne de Sceaux for 50 years. Work started in the middle of 1845, under the direction and assistance of his two sons-in-law. Lalanne worked on the route, earthworks and infrastructure. He worked later to extend the route as far as Robinson in 1893 and managed the branches from Bourg-la-Reine and Palaiseau to Orsay. Alexis Dulong (Note: Son of the physicist Pierre Louis Dulong. He is named on the face of the historic monument: la Gare Denfert-Rochereau, appelée anciennement Gare de Sceaux ou Embarcadère d'Enfert. Histoire : Témoin unique du premier âge des chemins de fer en région parisienne. Construit entre 1845 et 1846 sous la direction de l'ingénieur Dulong ("Denfert-Rochereau Station, lately called the Sceaux or Entrance to Hell. History: Only survivor of the first age of Parisian railways. Constructed between 1845 and 1846 by the engineer Dulong").) worked on procurement, for the track and stations. Arnoux's solution was not without its problems, and twenty years later it was replaced with a more standard solution.

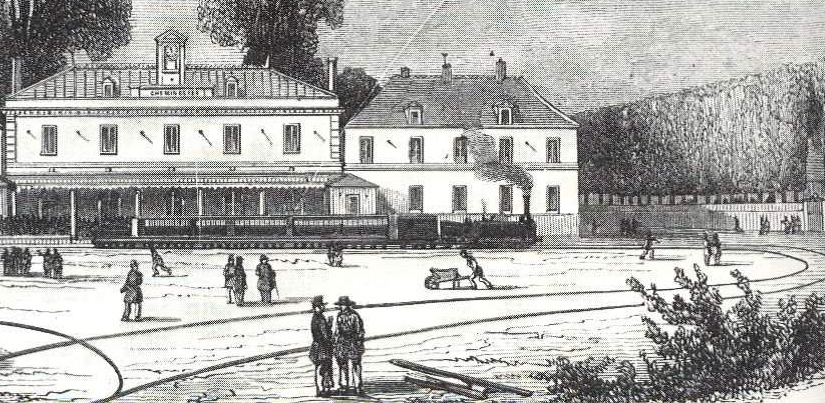
Station using the Arnoux System

The first line was from the Barrière d'Enfer ("Hell's Gate") (now Denfert-Rochereau) to Sceaux, Hauts-de-Seine. According to the timetables, in the year 1868 it ran to Paris every hour on the hour from 6am to 10pm and from Paris to Sceaux hourly from 6.47am to 10.47pm. The price in first class was 75 centimes, in second class 75 centimes, and in third class 45 centimes. Parisians who wanted to enjoy the countryside used it to get to Bals de Sceaux and Guinguettes de Robinson.

Arnoux had previously provided diligences for the Paris - Orléans journey from 10 June 1843; he hadn't foreseen their redundancy. This operation was first used on the first French (and first continental European) line, opened on 30 June 1827 between Paris and Saint-Étienne and 1 March 1832 to Andrézieux.

Arnoux died in 1866.

== Legacy ==
In Bourg-la-Reine a road following the old route of the first Ligne de Sceaux is named after Arnoux.

== See also ==
- Arnoux System
- Ligne de Sceaux
- Anjubault

== Sources ==
- French Academy of Sciences (1841). Comptes rendus hebdomadaires des séances de l'Académie des sciences [Weekly Proceedings of the Meetings of the Academy of Sciences] (in French). Vol. 11. Paris: Gauthier-Villars.
- Armengaud, Jacques-Eugène (1858). Publication industrielle des machines, outils et appareils les plus perfectionnés et les plus récents employés dans les différentes branches de l'industrie française et étrangère : Notices sur les machines locomotives envoyées à l'exposition universelle [Industrial Journal of the Most Perfect and Modern Machines, Utilities and Apparatus In Divers Branches of French and Foreign Industry: Notes on Locomotive Machines Displayed at the Exposition Universelle] (in French). Paris: A. Morel.
- Joly, André (1975). Images de Bourg-la-Reine (in French). Ingersheim: SAEP.
- Lequeux, James (2008). François Arago, un savant généreux: physique et astronomie au XIXeme siecle [François Arago, an all-round genius: physicist and astronomer]. EDP Sciences. ISBN 978-2-86883-999-2.
- Revue générale des Chemins de Fer, 1895
