= Arnoux system =

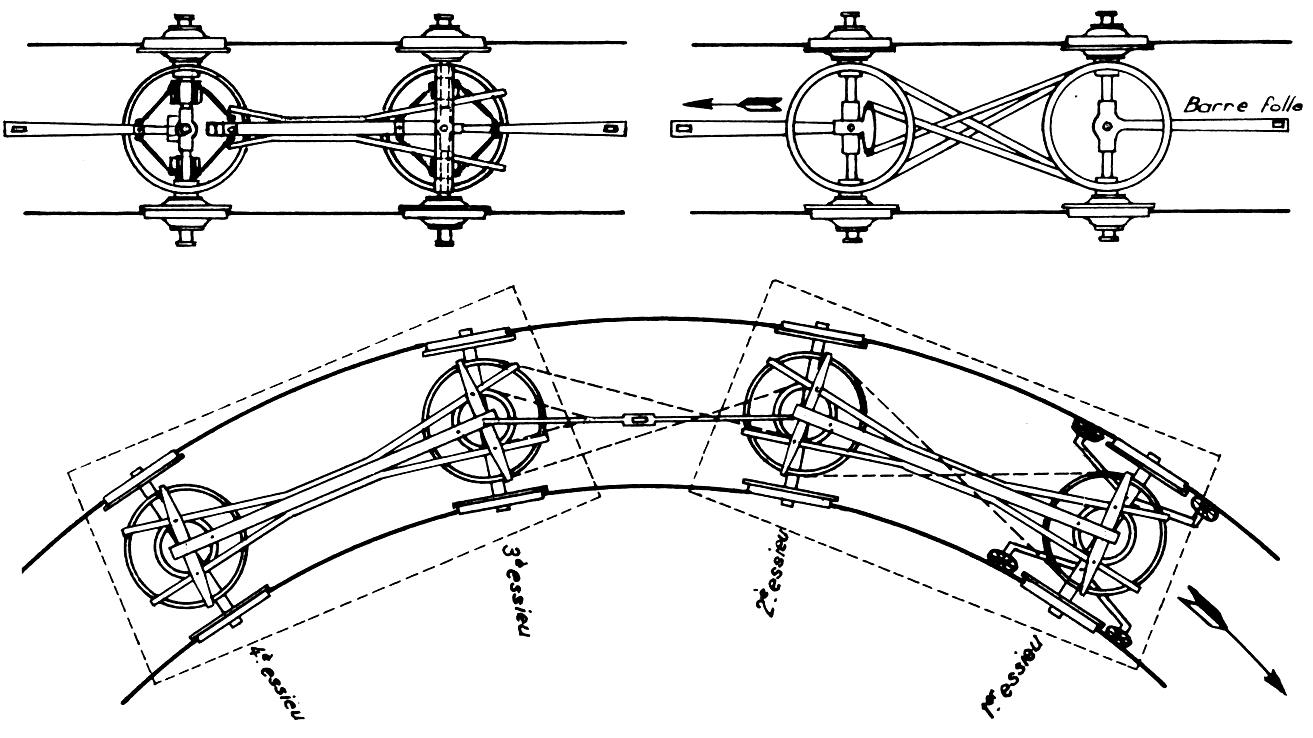
Diagram of the Arnoux System

The Arnoux system is a train articulation system, for turning on railroad tracks, invented by Jean-Claude-Républicain Arnoux and patented in France in 1838. Arnoux was the chief engineer of the Ligne de Sceaux, which was originally built with very tight radii in the area around Sceaux, Hauts-de-Seine.

With the support of the French Academy of Sciences, Arnoux devised a new articulation system that allowed train wheels to turn, the système ferroviaire dit Arnoux ("Arnoux rail system"), and the Ligne de Sceaux was built to test his prototypes. The line started commercial use in 1846, but the operating cost and the use of a broad gauge of 1,750 mm (5 ft 8 7/8 in) meant that it was not taken up more widely. The invention of the bogie made it redundant. It was abandoned entirely by 1893.

== System ==
=== Problem ===
When railways were in their infancy, trains comprised a steam locomotive and one or more railway carriages with two fixed axles. As speeds increased, this design caused significant wear to the track and instability in the track ballast.

=== Proposed solution ===
To resolve these faults, Arnoux proposed a system of essieux articulés ("Articulated axles") where the yaw angle of the wheels was reduced to basically zero. Arnoux adapted the system used on horse-carts, which pivoted each axle at its centre, to be applied equally over the two axles together.

Arnoux devised a system of chains and pulleys so that each of the wheels' correctly adjusted in yaw through the curve: as soon as the leading axle started to turn, all other axles would also turn by the same amount. However, this was flawed since not all carriages in a long train are on the same part of the curve. A compromise was to use pulleys of different diameters, with guide wheels on the locomotive to control their motion. Also, using a broad gauge of 1,750 mm (5 ft 8 7/8 in) was expected to give greater stability.

This system was not suitable for steam locomotives, so Arnoux invented a separate system for them. The locomotives had a 2-4-2 wheel arrangement and the driving wheels were flangeless. The carrying wheels were arranged to pivot and were controlled by near-horizontal guide wheels.

Arnoux applied for his patent, number 8342, on 28 March 1838.

== Practical application ==
=== Trials and the Grand Prix de l'Institut ===
Trials took place at Saint-Mandé between 1839 and 1840 in a 1 km (0.62 mi) circuit constructed by Alexis Dulong. These trials successfully demonstrated the stability and safety of the system. Public bodies, the Duke of Aumale and numerous members of the French Academy of Sciences, including François Arago. All unanimously praised the system.

After this experience, Arnoux was awarded the Grand Prix de Mécanique ("Grand Prize for Mechanical Engineering") by the Institute.

=== Concession & opening of the Ligne de Sceaux ===
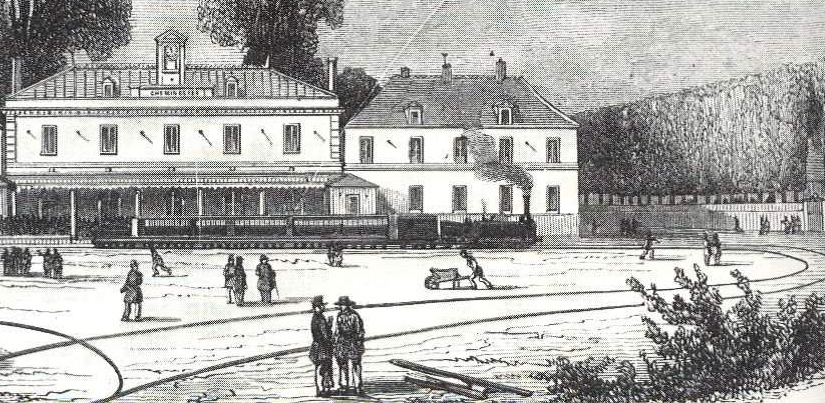
Système Arnoux train at terminus

At the suggestion of François Arago, the Arnoux system was implemented on the Ligne de Sceaux from Paris to Sceaux, Hauts-de-Seine. On 5 September 1844, Arnoux and the Minister of Public Works signed a contract to build and operate the line.

The line began service in 1846, starting from the Barrière d'enfer ("Hell's Gate") (see Denfert-Rochereau station) with a curved passenger building of 25-metre (82 ft) radius on a balloon loop to allow trains to reverse direction. The route then had its first stop at Arcueil, then Bourg-la-Reine on a 30-metre (98 ft) radius curve. The incline towards Sceaux was straight until the station at Fontenay-aux-Roses, then had a succession of curves at 63,-70-and-50-metre radii (207, 230 and 164 ft); the gradient was up to 11 mm/m (1.1%, 1:91), which was significant. All together the line was 10.5 km (6.5 mi) long.

== Alternatives ==
The problem of curves was solved using bogies, which were invented in the United States shortly after adopting rail transport, but this was unknown in Europe at the time. The Arnoux system bears some similarity to Cleminson's patent system, as both are designed to keep the axles radial to the curvature of the track.

Talgo utilises independent wheels mounted in a "rodal" between cars. Linkage rods keep the "rodal" aligned tangentially with the track. Like Arnoux, this system originally utilised (Iberian) broad gauge tracks, but recent versions are used on standard gauge or utilise variable gauge.

Current research may rework the Arnoux system by replacing its mechanical steering linkages with modern electronic systems. The most promising approach places independent traction motors in each wheel which not only propel the vehicle but also steer the individual wheelset by means of torque vectoring. This gives reduced weight and complexity over current bogies whilst also reducing wear on both the train and track. Examples include Actiwheel and their proposed running gear for the Next Generation Train.

== Abandonment ==
Use of the Arnoux System from Paris to Limours was abandoned in 1883 during negotiations with the government and the Compagnie du Chemin de Fer d'Orléans à Rouen for construction of new lines and the Ligne de Sceaux was the only route built to its design, with its unusual track gauge and specific construction of carriages and locomotives. The track was replaced overnight with standard gauge in May 1891.

== See also ==
- Jean-Claude-Républicain Arnoux
- Ligne de Sceaux
- Anjubault

== Sources ==
- Armengaud, Jacques-Eugène (1858). Publication industrielle des machines, outils et appareils les plus perfectionnés et les plus récents employés dans les différentes branches de l'industrie française et étrangère : Notices sur les machines locomotives envoyées à l'exposition universelle [Industrial Journal of the Most Perfect and Recent Machines, Utilities and Appliances in Divers Parts of French and Foreign Industry: Notes on Locomotives Displayed at the Exposition Universelle] (in French). Paris: A. Morel.
- Lequeux, James (2008). François Arago, un savant généreux: physique et astronomie au XIXe siècle [François Arago, a general genius: physics and astronomy in the 19th century] (in French). EDP Sciences. ISBN 978-2868839992.
- Jacobs, Gaston (1987). La ligne de Sceaux, 140 d'histoire (in French). La Vie du Rail. ISBN 2-902808-28-3.
- Revue Générale des Chemins de Fer, 1895
