= Kilsby Tunnel =

Railway tunnel in Northamptonshire, England

Coordinates: 52.331°N 1.164°W

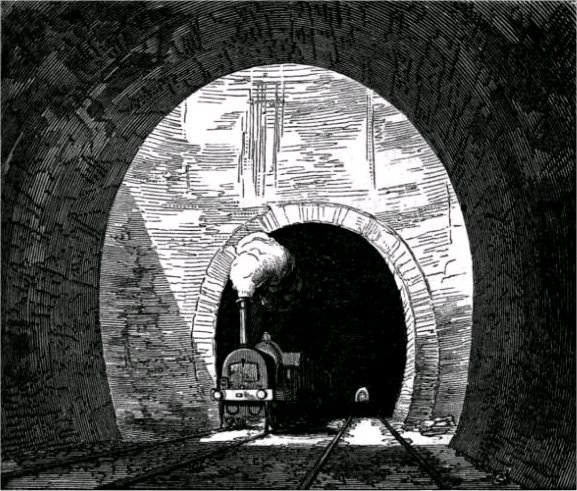
- Air shaft in the Kilsby Tunnel, illustrated in an 1852 railway publication
- Interactive map of Kilsby Tunnel

Overview
- Location: Northamptonshire
- Start: Kilsby
- End: Crick

Operation
- Owner: Network Rail
- Operator: West Coast Main Line

Technical
- Track length: 2,216 m
- No. of tracks: Two

The Kilsby Tunnel is a railway tunnel on the West Coast Main Line in England, near the village of Kilsby in Northamptonshire, roughly 5 miles (8 km) southeast of Rugby. It is 2,423 yards (2,216 m) long.

The Kilsby Tunnel was designed and engineered by Robert Stephenson for the London & Birmingham Railway (L&BR). It was constructed by contractors Joseph Nowell & Sons and later by the L&BR. It took much longer to construct and exceeded its estimated cost, attributed to a roof collapse and consequential flooding. At the time of its opening in 1838, it was the longest railway tunnel ever constructed.

The tunnel had atypically large ventilation shafts, because of a lack of experience as to how much ventilation would be needed for steam locomotives to pass through. In March 1987, Kilsby Tunnel portals and its two ventilation shafts were given listed status.

== History ==
=== Construction ===
In the 1830s, Robert Stephenson developed the London and Birmingham Railway (L&BR) (later known as the West Coast Main Line). After opposition from several landowners and proprietors in Northampton in July 1832, the House of Lords rejected the original bill to authorise construction of the line. Stephenson surveyed an alternative route to the west of the town that included Kilsby Tunnel. The 2,423 yard tunnel would be the world's longest railway tunnel. In May 1835, Joseph Nowell & Sons was awarded the tunnel contract, which was valued at £98,988 (equivalent to £10,880,000 in 2025).

Construction proved to be less than straightforward. Within months of work commencing, the second of the working shafts was flooded because of large amounts of quicksand not revealed by trial borings into the hill. Similar problems had been encountered during the construction of Blisworth Tunnel on the Grand Union Canal a few decades earlier. Problems posed by the quicksand at tunnel level were so severe that abandoning the shaft and restarting work elsewhere was considered. Stress from the project was said to have caused Joseph Nowell's ill-health and death.

At the recommendation of George Stephenson, several steam-powered pumps were installed to extract water from the quicksand inside the tunnel. The pumps removed up to 2,000 gallons of water from a depth of 120 feet every minute of operation and took up to eight months. Seven more shafts were sunk to install timber cylinders to hold back the sand. During this time, multiple attempts were made to construct the tunnel's brick lining using a raft to float men and materials into position. As a protective measure, the lining's thickness was increased from 18 inches to in excess of two feet and straw was used to deflect and control the ingress of water to prevent wet concrete from being washed away from newly laid bricks.

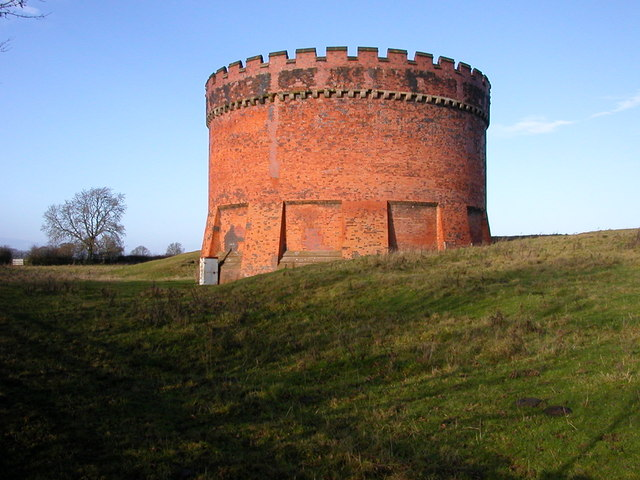
One of the ventilation towers above the tunnel

An unusual feature of the tunnel is the size of its ventilation shafts, which were adapted from ten of the working shafts used during its construction. In May 1836, work started on the first of two shafts, which were 132 feet deep and 20 yards in diameter. The shafts were sunk using sequentially dug trenches around the circumference and took over a year to reach the bottom of each shaft. Its three-foot-thick walls required over one million bricks and weighed an estimated 4,034 tonnes. For aesthetic reasons both shafts are castellated.

Author Graeme Bickerdike has speculated that, while their size is excessive in regards to providing airflow, considerable importance was placed on overcoming public perceptions and worries over personal health due to insufficient ventilation, especially in regards to the use of steam locomotives inside lengthy tunnels. Several newspapers had negatively commented on the issues, and it is likely that Stephenson would have wanted to silence critics and assuage these sentiments by visibly demonstrating how much ventilation was being provided.

=== Completion and subsequent activities ===
On 21 June 1838, resident engineer Charles Lean laid the final brick of the tunnel, marking its completion. It took three years, and cost £320,000 to build, (equivalent to £30,670,000 in 2025) three times the original estimate. The high accident rate in the course of its construction included the deaths of 26 of the 1,250 workers. The length of time it took to build delayed the opening of the L&BR. On 20 August 1838, the directors of the L&BR conducted the first ever rail journey between Birmingham Curzon Street railway station and Euston railway station, London. On the way, the train briefly stopped at the tunnel so that they could marvel at the structure and meet some of the workmen. Regular services using the tunnel commenced soon after.

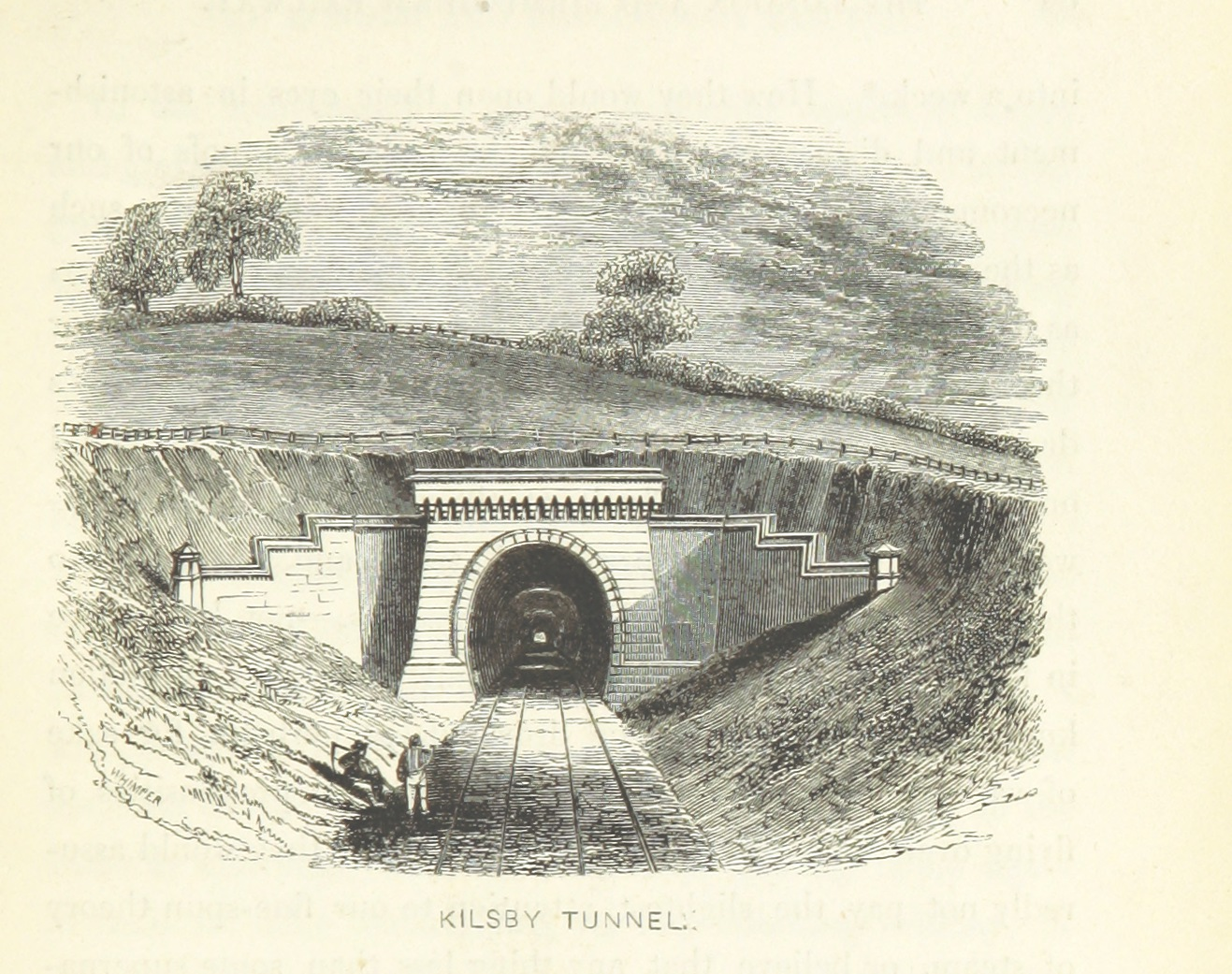
Drawing from 1839 of one of the tunnel portals shortly after opening.

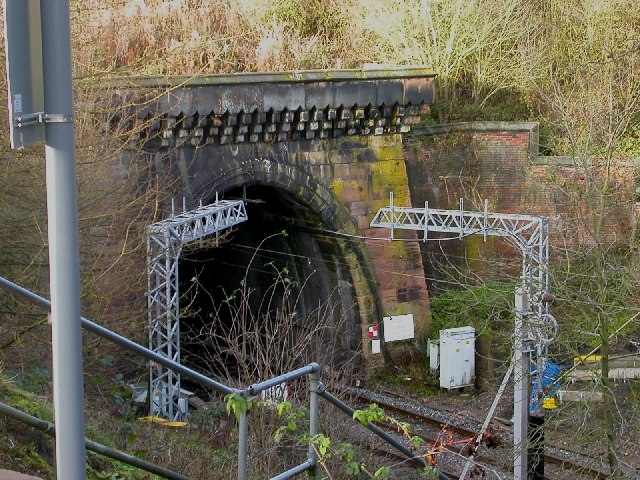
South portal of the tunnel in 2005.

During early operations, train movements were controlled by two policeman, one at either end of the tunnel, who signalled the presence of a train to each other, and only one train was allowed to enter the tunnel at a time. In June 1852, a fatal collision occurred between a ballast train and a coal train as a result of signals that were either not issued or were not received.

In March 1987, both the north and south portals of Kilsby Tunnel were Grade II* listed; furthermore, the two largest ventilation shafts were also listed, the north shaft being Grade II* listed while the south shaft was Grade II listed. During the tunnel's service life, there have been no major problems or difficulties with the structure. During a survey conducted during the 2010s, it was found to be in a largely good condition.

During the 2010s, Kilsby Tunnel was restored by Network Rail. Maintenance focused on inspecting the ventilation shafts and repairs to the brickwork of one shaft was carried out, sections of the tunnel's lining were replaced. While unusual means of access were used because of the listed status of the shafts, the repairs were described as routine.

At the beginning of 2020, an estimated 400 trains were using the tunnel daily. Due to the drastic reduction in rail traffic caused by the COVID-19 pandemic, Network Rail took the rare opportunity to close the tunnel for two weeks in May 2020 in order to carry out major works, including replacing much of the tunnel's drainage system, which had become clogged by heavily limed water seeping through, causing flooding problems, and also replacing much of the track and ballast. This was the longest total closure of the tunnel since it was opened, with all trains diverted temporarily via Northampton. In normal times the work would have required many short blockades, and taken months to complete. It allowed a temporary speed restriction through the tunnel of 70 mph to be lifted, enabling trains to operate at the normal line speed of 110 mph.

== See also ==
Other L&BR tunnels:

- Primrose Hill Tunnel, London
- Watford Tunnels, Hertfordshire
