= Clock Tower, St Albans =

Clock Tower in St Albans, Hertfordshire, England

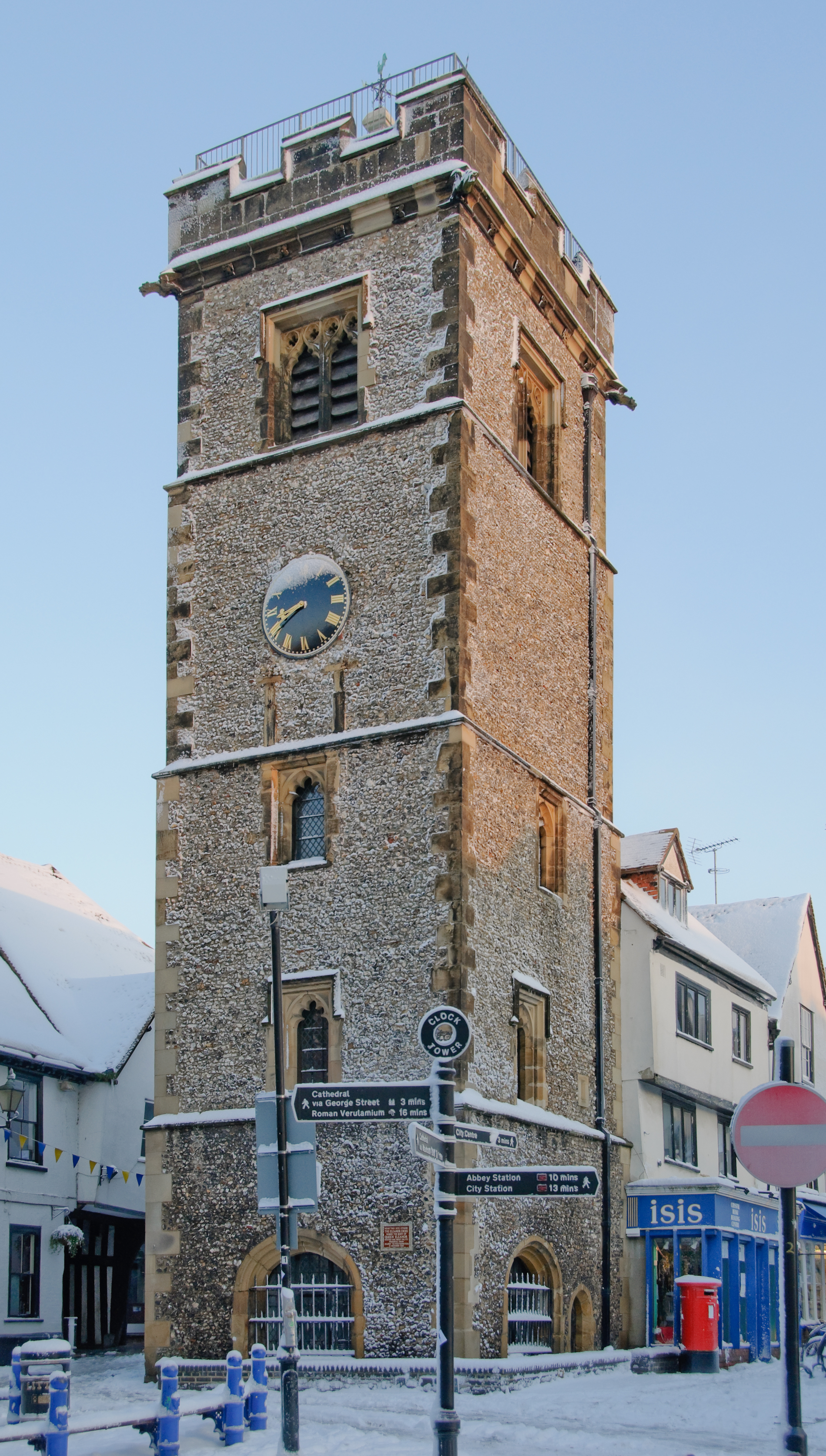
- The Clock Tower in St Albans

- Shown in Hertfordshire
- 51°45′05″N 0°20′26″W
- Type: Clock tower
- Location: St Albans, Hertfordshire, England, UK
- Nearest city: St Albans

History
- Built: c. 1405
- Original use: Bell tower

Site notes
- Height: 19.6 metres (64 ft)
- Architect: Thomas Wolvey
- Architectural style: Medieval
- Restored: 1866
- Restored by: George Gilbert Scott
- Current use: Clock tower
- Owner: St Albans City & District Council
- Website: Clock Tower—St Albans Museums

Listed Building – Grade I
- Official name: Clock Tower
- Designated: 1950-05-07
- Reference no.: 1103127

The Clock Tower, St Albans is a Grade I listed belfry in St Albans, England which was constructed between 1403 and 1412, believed to have been completed in 1405. It has been claimed to be the only remaining medieval town belfry in England. Its construction has been seen as a protest against the power of the local abbey to regulate time-keeping in the town.

== Design ==
The Clock Tower is 19.6 metres (64 ft) high, and has five floors including the roof. Each floor is slightly narrower than the previous, with each floor being marked externally by a stone string course. The outside of the Tower is faced in flint, and has freestone dressings, including quoins on each corner. The stone-battlemented parapet features gargoyles on each angle. The ground floor has three wide windows (one on each exposed face) under four centred, triple chamfered arches. The second floor features 2 windows on each face, one above the other. Each window is cusped and rests under a square head. The third floor features the clock on the southern face, and a solitary window on the north. This is a cusped ogee window with trefoils carved into the spandrels. The fourth floor similarly has cusped ogee windows, however, on this floor they appear on each face, and are doubles. The top floor of the Clock Tower doubles as its roof, which can be reached via a 93-step spiral staircase.

== History ==
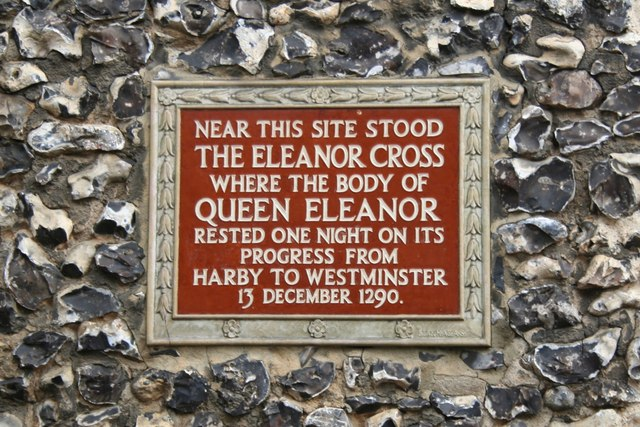
The plaque affixed to the front face of the Clock Tower highlighting the site of the Eleanor Cross

The Clock Tower was built between 1403 and 1412, and is believed to have been completed in 1405. The Tower was built close to the site of the Eleanor cross. Twelve Eleanor crosses were constructed throughout eastern England under the orders of King Edward I between 1291 and 1294 in memory of his wife Eleanor of Castile. The site of each cross marks the nightly resting place of Eleanor's funeral procession.

The cross at St Albans cost £113 to build and was constructed in 1291. The top section of the St Albans Eleanor Cross was destroyed during the English Civil War, and the rest of the monument was later demolished in 1701–1702. In its place, the Market cross, a gazebo style structure was built in 1703. This in turn was torn down in 1810, as it was deemed to be a danger to traffic. Once removed, railings were installed around the town pump. The pump was subsequently also removed, and, in 1874, philanthropist Isabella Worley donated a drinking fountain to the town. In the latter part of the 20th Century, the fountain was dismantled and rebuilt in nearby Victoria Square.

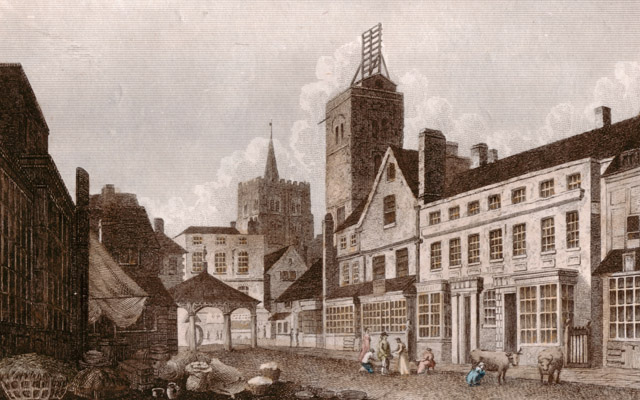
St. Albans High Street in 1807, showing the shutter telegraph style semaphore atop the Clock Tower, part of the London to Great Yarmouth Line.

The Tower was designed and built by Thomas Wolvey a former Royal Mason, and it is believed it was built as a protest against the power of St Albans Abbey. The belief is that the local merchants were in favour of the Tower being built, as it meant their hours would no longer be decided by those at the Abbey, who had a clock and peal of bells of their own. Prolific architect Sir Gilbert Scott would later state that he believed the initial purpose of the Clock Tower was as a free-standing bell tower, similar to other structures such as Giotto's Campanile in Florence. The location of the Tower was also part of this protest; the Clock Tower looks 'face to face' with the Abbey, but sits on higher ground. It is unknown if the Tower had a clock-face from its inception, however, it is known that there was one in place by 1485.

During the Napoleonic Wars the Clock Tower's height was an advantage and the roof was used as a semaphore station. The shutter telegraph style semaphore was part of the 16 station London to Great Yarmouth line, along which a message could be sent within 5 minutes. The semaphore station itself was built atop a small wooden observation hut which was erected on the roof. The observation hut was removed in 1852.

In 1858, the living quarters at the base of the Tower were destroyed, which in turn meant that the rest of tower fell into a state of disrepair. Five years later in 1863, a proposal was made to demolish the entire structure. A year later, Sir Gilbert Scott was commissioned to produce a report on the state of the Tower, and its estimated cost of restoration. Scott would state that the building could be restored at a cost of approximately £700. The final cost of the repairs, however, was £1000. The restoration was completed in 1866, with almost all of the external masonry work being renewed. Further features such as Gargoyles, new windows and a new clock mechanism were installed. A capped turret was also installed.

Historically, the ground floor of the tower was used a shop, with the first floor being reserved as the shopkeeper's housing. This was the case until roughly 1900. The second floor was the clock keepers living quarters, with the third floor housing the clock and related mechanism. The fourth floor houses the bells.

Noted author and illustrator Frederick George Kitton produced several sketches of the Clock Tower and wrote a document detailing the history of building from construction round to the then present day (1901/1902).

The Clock Tower is owned and operated by St Albans District Council.

== Bells and clock ==
The Clock Tower contains two bells, one familiarly known as Gabriel and the Market bell. The Market bell was created by Richard Phelps in c. 1729 and has a diameter of just under 15 inches. Phelps also cast the original eight bells at the nearby Church of St Peter. The inscription around the waist of the bell reads "Thomas Robins, Mayor of St Albans, 1729." The market bell was originally installed in the market house to announce the opening of St Albans Market to traders who were not freemen of the town. Only freemen of the town were allowed to trade before the ringing of the bell, which was rung at 10:00 in the market house. The bell was used for this purpose until 1835.

Gabriel is the larger of the two bells and is so named as result of the inscription on the bell "Missi De Celis Habeo Nomen Gabrielis" ("I am Heaven sent, in Gabriel's name"). Although the date of its construction is unknown, John Harris of the British Archaeological Association believed that it was cast c. 1335. Gabriels diameter is approximately 3 ft 10 in and it weighs roughly one ton. Gabriel would have been rung at approximately 4 am to mark the Angelus, and again at 8–9 pm for the curfew. In addition, the bells could also be run in the event of emergencies, this could be something as simple as a fire, or as historic as the First Battle of St Albans.

It is unknown when the clock was installed in the tower, and in general clocks at the time were a rare occurrence - the oldest known clock in the United Kingdom was found in a clock tower in Westminster built in 1288. Richard of Wallingford, the 29th abbot of St Albans designed an astronomical clock, which was built approximately 20 years after his death. The Tower was referred to as the "Clokkehouse" in 1412 shortly after the Tower was built. It is unknown however if this referred to a physical clock, or the fact that the bells rung on the hour. A clock is known to have existed in 1485; when it was mentioned on a lease to a tenant. It was the tenant's job to ensure the clock was wound and maintained. The present clock dates from 1866 and uses a mechanism designed by Lord Grimthorpe, the same man who designed the clock mechanism that sits atop the Palace of Westminster commonly known as Big Ben. The clock, which was installed as part of the 1866 renovations cost £200 and was to be wound "every fourth day".

The clock mechanism will undergo restoration works in 2021, carried out by Smiths of Derby, funded by a grant from Historic England.

== Access ==
The Clock Tower is open on weekends and bank holidays between Good Friday and the end of September. It also open under the Heritage Open Days scheme and is sometimes open during special occasions such as the turning on of the St Albans Christmas Lights. The Tower is opened by a group of volunteers from the St Albans Civic Society and The St Albans and Hertfordshire Architectural & Archaeological Society.

== See also ==
- Corn Exchange, St Albans
- List of clock towers
- St Albans Market
