= St Albans Market =

Street market in St Albans, Hertfordshire

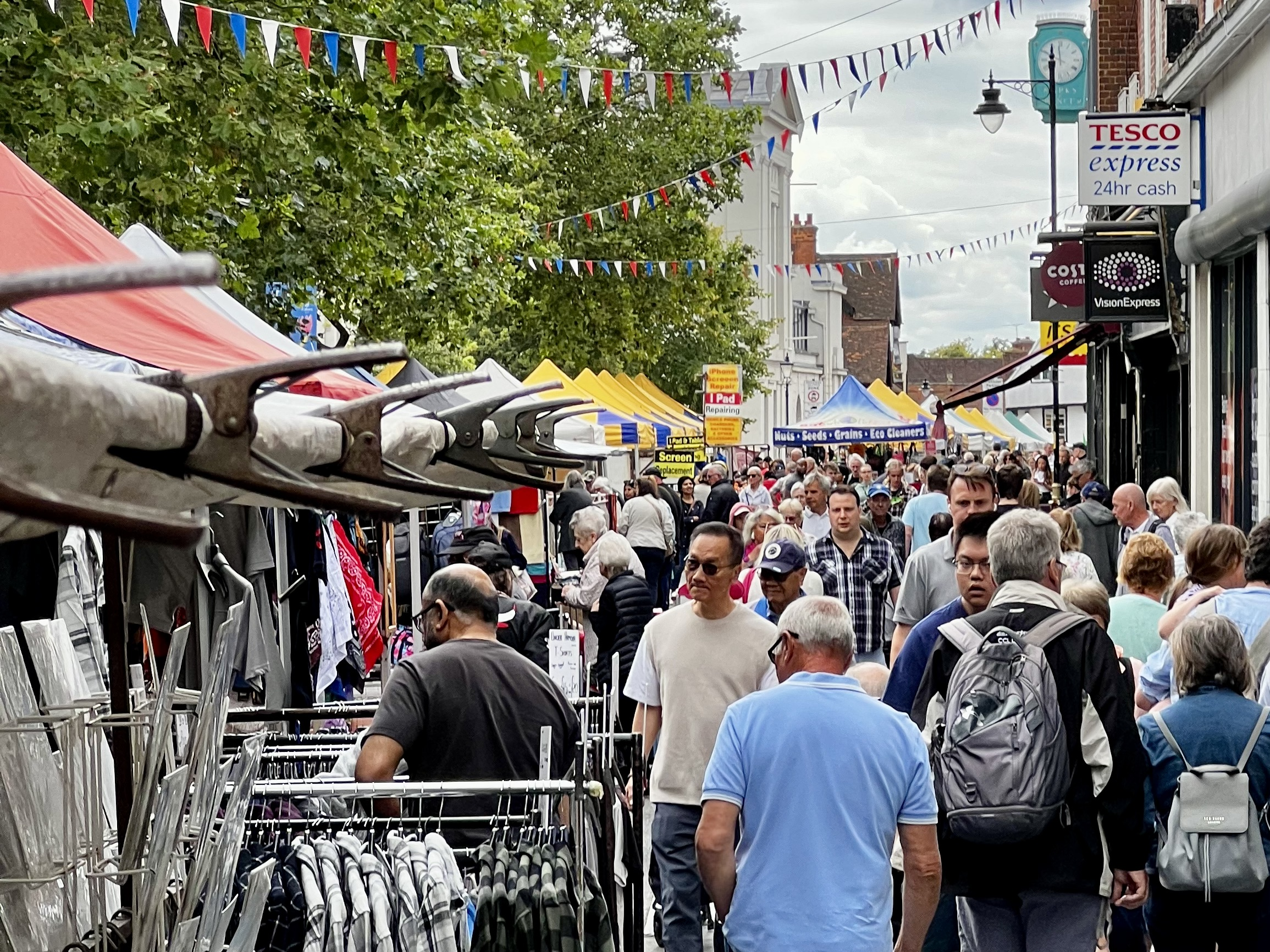
- A busy St Peter’s Street in August 2023
- Location: St Peter's Street, St Albans, AL1 3ED; St Albans; 51.754267°N 0.337134°W
- Opening date: 860 (1166 years ago)
- Developer: Wulsin
- Management: St Albans City & District Council
- Owner: St Albans City & District Council
- Environment: Outdoor
- Goods sold: Fresh fruit and vegetables, fresh fish, bread, cheese, street food, fashion, accessories, prints, jewellery, records, blinds, fabric, foam cut to size, nuts, olives, baked goods
- Days normally open: Wednesday, Saturday, Second Sunday of each month
- Number of tenants: 165
- Total retail floor area: 1,215 m^{2} (13,080 sq ft) (total area of pitches)
- Parking: 1,523
- Website: stalbans.gov.uk/markets
- Location within Hertfordshire

St Albans Market is an outdoor street market in the cathedral city and market town of St Albans. The market runs from Market Place North-East up St Peter's Street to the junction with Catherine Street—for a length of 485 metres (1,591 ft)—and is managed by St Albans City & District Council.

Following the closure of Canterbury Market in 2022, St Albans is England’s oldest market as well as the oldest English street market and the oldest market in England that is still held on its original site. In 2024 St Albans Market was awarded the title Best Large Outdoor Market by the National Association of British Market Authorities.

== History ==
=== Beginnings and the medieval market ===
Wulsin, the sixth abbot of St Albans Abbey founded St Albans Market in c. 860 to generate income for the Abbey and to form the centre of a new town. Market Place is next to the Waxhouse Gate entrance to the abbey and it is possible that the market had already formed around this gate before coming under the control of the abbey. The market was managed on behalf of the abbey by a clerk of the market.

In the time of Abbot Geoffrey de Gorham (1119–1146) the income from the tolls and the market dues are given as £11-14-0 (equivalent to £20,602.5 in 2025).

Henry II of England (1154–1189) confirmed the Abbey's control of "the town of St Albans with the market place and every liberty a borough ought to have." There was further confirmation of the abbey's market rights by Richard I in 1198.

The market was divided into areas where traders of similar commodities all competed for customers. The known areas are the:

- Fleshambles for meat,
- Fish shambles for fish,
- Malt cheping,
- Wheat cheping,
- Leather shambles,
- Pudding shambles,
- Wool market, and
- Cordwainers Row.

By 1287, at the latest, market days had become established as Wednesday and Saturday as they still were in the twenty-first century.

By this time, the abbey had also founded markets at Codicote, High Barnet, and Watford. Of these, High Barnet and Watford markets are still trading.

In the early 1290s an Eleanor cross was erected at the southern end of Market Place between the market and the entrance to the abbey.

The Moot Hall was the building in which the abbot's court dealt with legal issues arising within the town and surrounding area and was also the venue for the court of piepowders which dealt with legal issues arising on the market.

A plan of mediæval St Albans Market and its most important buildings.

In the summer of 1297 John of Berkhamsted found himself on the wrong side of the bench when the inhabitants of St Albans made a complaint to Edward I and the abbot was found guilty of weights and measures offences concerning bread and ale. For a few weeks the market fell under royal control before being returned to the abbey. Edward reconfirmed the abbey's market rights in 1301. In the 1334 subsidy roll, the market was valued at £265-3-8 (equivalent to £288,866.4 in 2025) for the purposes of taxation.

In the thirteenth century, many of the stalls gave way to permanent building and shops and by 1355 large parts of Market Place had been built over. In the earlier part of the thirteenth century, fees are recorded for stalls in the Market Place but in the next century the term shops supersedes that of stalls.

=== Early modern period and the end of the abbey ===
By at least 1519 the abbey was leasing out the collection of the market rents. The first known lessee being John Gelly with a lease of thirty-one years.

==== A royal market ====
As part of the dissolution of the monasteries, Henry VIII closed the Abbey in 1539 and took possession of the market, it remained crown property for the next fourteen years. The holder of the lease for market rents at that time was a Raynold Carte, who held it at an annual rent of £13-6-0 (equivalent to £11,159.5 in 2025). For an unstated offence he was placed in the pillory on a market day in 1541 from one hour before the market opened until an hour after the market closed.

==== The town takes control ====
In 1553, Henry’s son Edward VI sold the right to hold the market on Wednesdays and Saturdays as well as three fairs on:

- Lady Day (25 March) which was New Years Day until 1752 and the day when tenant farmers would move to their new farms;
- St Alban's Day (22 June) to commemorate the patron saint of the town; and
- Michaelmas Day (29 September) a quarter day, the date for the election of town officials, and the day when hiring or mop fairs were held

to a group of local merchants and landowners. The letters patent which recorded this sale also incorporated St Albans as a borough.

The new mayor acted as clerk of the market overseeing the setting of prices, the accuracy of weights and measures, and presided over the court of piepowders.

Following the restoration, St Albans received a charter in 1664 affirming the town's right to "hold markets and fairs as well in the waste and open streets and places ... as elsewhere" and to "erect shambles and stalls and there buy, sell and expose to sale, wares, merchandise, corn, grain, cattle, horses and other saleable things ... and take and levy tolls, stallage, and other profits of saleable things".

As had the abbey and the crown in the preceding century, in the seventeenth century the corporation leased out the rents of the fairs and markets to bailiffs who paid a fixed rent. At between £40 (equivalent to £6,282.8 in 2025) and £80 (equivalent to £12,565.6 in 2025), in the second half of the century, this was the largest single source of revenue for the corporation.

The town took measures to protect the market income passing a resolution in 1699 threatening prosecution for anyone selling grain "and other things" without paying market tolls. In 1702 the prohibited the selling of corn before 10:00 and only if tolls had been paid on corn grown outside the Borough.

In 1702 the remaining stump of the Eleanor Cross was demolished and in the following year the corporation ordered that a market cross "be built and set upon the waste ground where the old Cross lately stood near to the Clock House." The cross erected in 1703 was an octagonal building with a roof supported upon eight columns above which was the figure of Justice, and within it was the town pump worked by a large wheel.

==== Closure of the Wednesday market ====
In the early eighteenth century the Wednesday market ceased trading.

In 1720 the town attempted to prevent the forestalling of "poultry or other goods". Nine years late a market bell was installed in the market house to announce the opening of the market to traders who were not freemen of the town. Only freemen of the town were allowed to trade before the ringing of the bell, which was rung at 10:00 in the market house, The bell was used until 1835.

The eighteenth century saw a decline in the number of markets in England with Shefford and Toddington in neighbouring Bedfordshire disappearing completely. The annual revenue from the markets reached £326 (equivalent to £48,038.9 in 2025) in 1709–10, then dropped to around £100 (equivalent to £18,726.8 in 2025) in the mid-1730s, and then further dropped to £59 (equivalent to £11,310.5 in 2025) around 1750. The corn market is described as being the first market for corn in England at the beginning of the century but no longer holding that title by the 1750s. Despite the decline in revenue and reputation, the fact that St Albans remained at the centre of a transport hub meant it could still be described as "one of the greatest in England".

The end of the century saw the addition of a plait market on Saturdays. In the 1790s the Lady Day and Old Michaelmas (10 October) fairs are described as well attended and markets at which clothes and toys were traded. The statute fair for hiring farm servants, held at New Michaelmas is described as "sometimes but thinly attended" because of competing fairs held earlier in the year.

Historic market income
Year(s)	Income (£sd)			Income adjusted for inflation (£)
Year(s)	£	s.	d.	Income adjusted for inflation (£)
c. 1119–1146	11	14	0	20,602.55
1539	13	6	0	11,159.53
c. 1675	60	0	0	9,424.19
1710	326	0	0	48,038.88
c. 1735	100	0	0	18,726.79
c. 1750	59	0	0	11,310.45

=== Industrial Revolution and wholesale market ===
By the early nineteenth century the St Albans Turnpike Trust reported that in the year from June 1808 alone, over 45,000 carts and carriages and 260,000 market-bound animals were recorded at the local tollgates.

The Market Cross was taken down in 1810, but the pump remained.

The use of market places for humiliating public punishments continued into the mid-nineteenth century. At the Midsummer court sessions of 1812 (24 June) a man was convicted of unnatural assault, a euphemism used then for same-sex sexual activity. He was imprisoned for twelve months, but also condemned to the pillory, on a market day, in St Albans for one hour before noon. At this point the use of the pillory seems to have gone out of fashion as one had to be borrowed from Hertford. This was the last use of the pillory in Hertfordshire.

By 1815 the plait market was being described by Shaw as "one of the largest in England".

A new town hall and courthouse was built on the site of the old Moot Hall in 1830. The town hall opened directly onto the market enabling the stalls to reach into the building.

In 1841 Queen Victoria passed through St Albans on her way to and from Panshanger country house on a Thursday and a Saturday. In her journal she recorded of the Saturday that "It being market day the town was still more crowded than the other day and we again met with a very kind reception.".

The repeal of the Corn Laws in 1846 greatly increased the opportunities for trading grains. The existing grain market—where grain was sold retail to householders, and wholesale to millers, bakers and other traders—consisted of a roof supported on posts and open on all sides to the elements. In 1857 this building was replaced with a new Corn Exchange that still stands today.

In 1872 the town pump was replaced by a drinking fountain.

In 1888 a commissioner arrived in St Albans gathering evidence for the Royal Commission on Market Rights and Tolls (1889–1891). According to a newspaper report of the time, the market was stated as taking place between the Clock Tower and opposite the White Horse pub (now a Marks & Spencer store).

Fees varied as to whether someone was a local property tax payer and depending on what commodities they sold:

One penny per foot appeared to be the general charge for persons who are ratepayers of St Albans and three half-pence per foot for outsiders. One or two stall-keepers who have the reputation for doing very lucrative and large trade in the market on Saturdays were purposely charged more, Mr Fisher, butcher, paying 6s. rent in contrast to 1s. 6d. paid by others. A cheesemonger, too, pays on the higher scale. It was explained to the Commissioner that this was all done designedly inasmuch as the market committee felt a duty to take cognizance of the fact that as much as £60 and £70 is taken every Saturday by certain stall-keeper, who is a stranger to St Albans

The then market manager, Mr Pointon, was privately letting out stall equipment to the same traders that he was renting pitches to on behalf of the city.

It was shown that whilst there was demand for a covered market in the fashion of other market towns, the city had not the resources to build one: "We have done the sewerage and the cemetery and many other local improvements. The Council does not possess any land suitable for a covered market."

The report also found that none of the annual fairs were still taking place.

==== Return of the Wednesday market ====
Due to Sunday trading laws if cattle were purchased on a Saturday, they could not complete their journey on the Sabbath. Buyers would have to bear the costs of stabling and feeding their purchased animals till Monday. Local farmers started sending their cattle to Hertford, Barnet, Hemel Hempstead, Watford, and Hitchin markets.

In the spring of 1872 Town Councillor Edwards was active in promoting the change of the cattle and corn markets to Wednesdays. Councillors and farmers all agreed.

Sale of horses, carriages, carts, harness, implements was transferred to the St Albans Wednesday Cattle Market from Harpenden in 1890.

The relaunched cattle market was a success with the business of each cattle market was printed in the following Saturday's edition of the Herts Advertiser and St Albans Times. In 1892 among the 14 individual sellers two were women and four were members of parliament (two as members of the House of Commons and two as hereditary peers in the House of Lords) including the then Prime Minister Robert Gascoyne-Cecil:

St Albans Cattle Market Wednesday 27 April 1892
Description of stock	Price realized			Income adjusted for inflation (£)	Vendor
Description of stock	£	s.	d.	Income adjusted for inflation (£)	Vendor
Wether sheep	3	5	0	357.02	Mr Rumball
'' ''	3	4	0	351.53	Mr H. B. Cox
'' ''	3	3	6	349.33	Mr Byles
Clipped tegs (20 averaged)	3	4	0	351.53	Mr J. B. Maple M.P.
Tegs in the wool	3	3	6	349.33	Mr H. B. Cox
Dorset ewes	2	17	6	316.37	Mr H Bailey
Scotch tegs	2	4	6	244.97	Mr Herd
Lambs (10 averaged)	2	5	6	250.46	Mr W. A. Smith
Bullocks (shorthorn)	28	0	0	3,075.86	Mr J. B. Maple M.P.
'' ''	26	0	0	2,856.15	'' '' '' ''
'' ''	26	0	0	2,856.15	'' '' '' ''
8 Polled Angus averaged	24	6	8	2,672.70	Madam de Falbe
Fat Heifer	22	10	0	2,471.67	Mrs Baxendale
Jersey cow	9	5	0	1,016.13	The Rt Hon, the Earl of Verulam
Cow in calf	20	10	0	2,251.97	The Most Noble the Marquis of Salisbury
6 Jersey calves (highest price)	2	10	0	274.63	Lord Grimston M.P.
Fat pig	4	7	0	477.86	Mr J. Baker
'' ''	4	7	0	477.86	Mr J E Holinshead

The cattle market was note entirely restricted to animals, hay and straw are also mentioned as well as a portable steam engine that sold for £50.

By the 1880s selling plait wholesale had given way to finished products and hat making was becoming a major local industry.

The short-lived weekly, The Lantern, gives a description of the market in 1893:

The primitive street market, with oil lamps flaming away, and the loud cries of the bellicose vendors of all kinds of imaginable wares filling the air, makes it quite captivating.

=== Twentieth and twenty-first centuries ===
The Council passed a byelaw in 1911, making an offence of writing on pavements, to deter women's suffrage campaigners who were advertising their meetings in Market Place by chalking the details on the pavement. On the Saturday market the self same campaigners sold copies of their newspaper, The Vote.

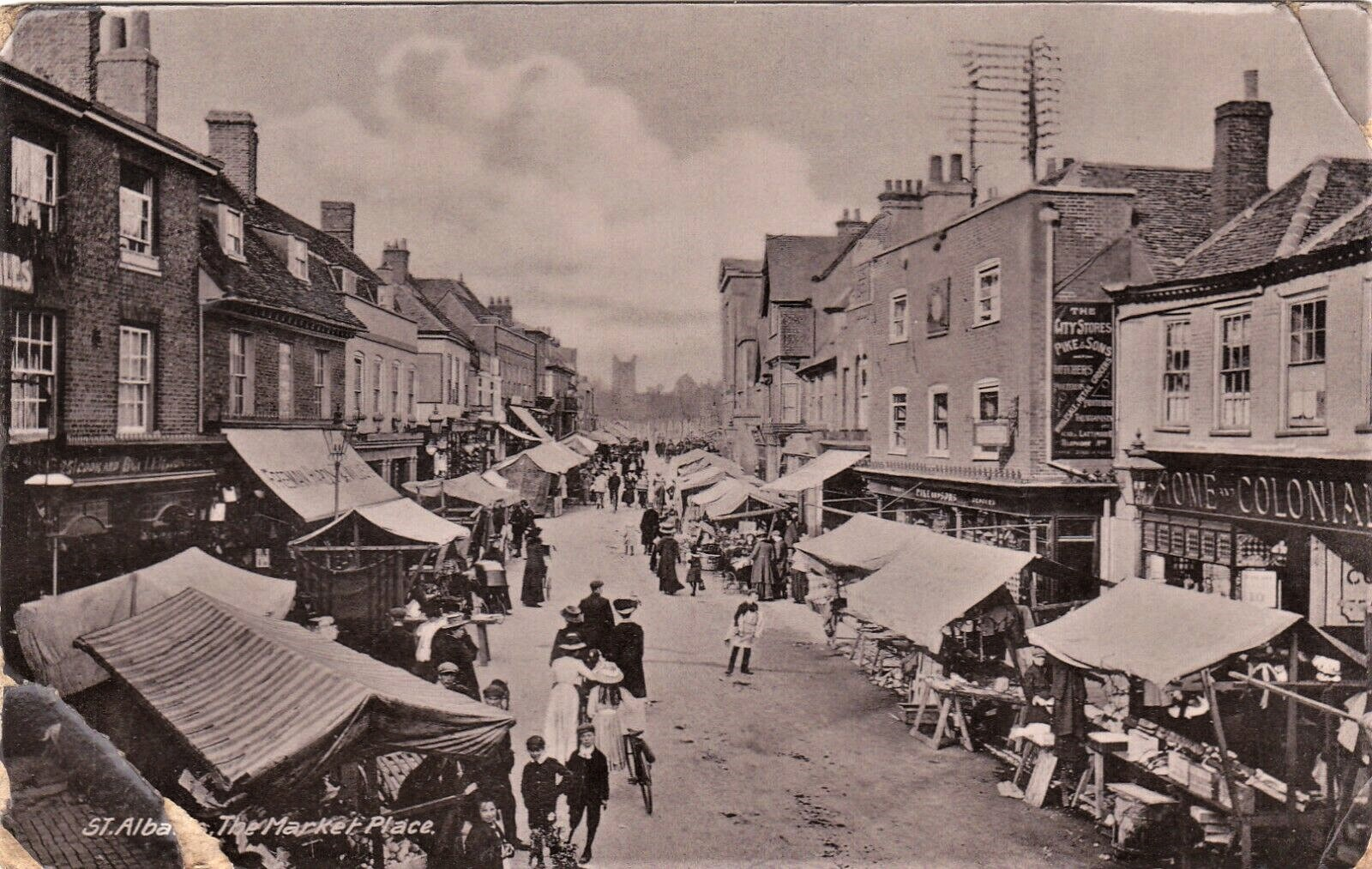
Market Place, St Albans on market day in 1915

In the late 1920s the public drinking fountain to the south of the Clock House (now known as the Clocktower) was removed due to the obstruction it was causing to the public highway. After hosting an Eleanor Cross, a market cross, a town pump, and then a public drinking fountain in sharp succession; the site has been left empty since.

In 1926 the Wednesday cattle auction was moved from outside of the Town Hall (now the Museum + Art Gallery) to a site on Drovers Way that is now occupied by a multi-story car park.

In the early twentieth century the Council used their powers under the Shops Act 1911 to make the Wednesday market day an early closing day for retail shops. Passing the regulation required the assent of the owners of two thirds of the affected shops.

Better storage and refrigeration facilities saw the gradual end of the trade in live animals for food and in 1976 the cattle market was closed.

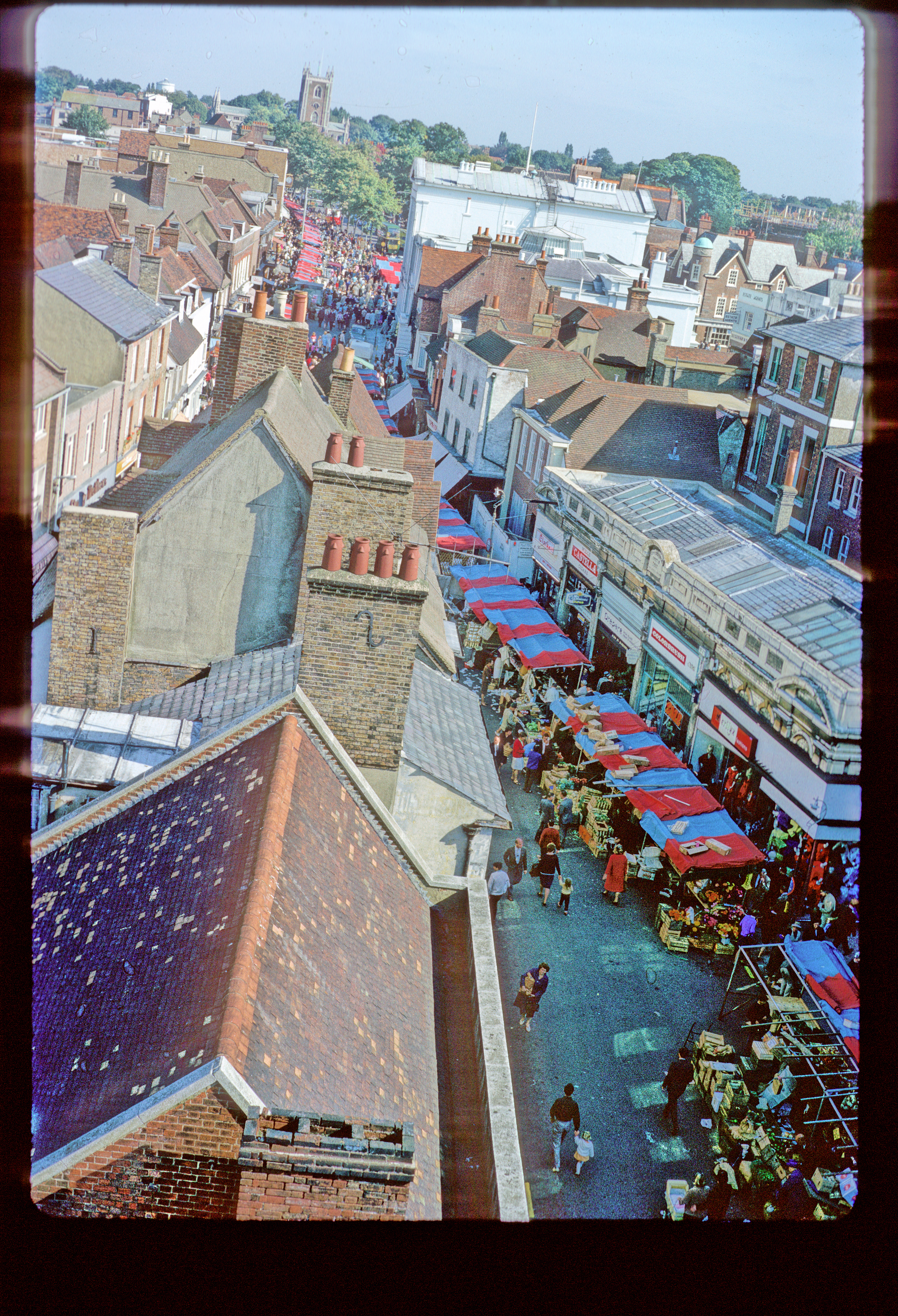
A view from the Clocktower north east along St Peter’s Street on Saturday 17 September 1966

Sometime in the later part of the twentieth century the Council began erecting their own stalls using trailers and tractors and storing their equipment in a yard next to the Cattle Market on Drovers Way. The new, built market, was a convenience to the traders and enabled the Council to more effectively control the layout of the market and the space occupied by individual traders.

The early closing of shops on Wednesdays ended with the passing of the Deregulation and Contracting Out Act 1994.

The boom in coach excursions that had sustained St Albans and many other provincial markets faltered towards the end of the twentieth century due to an ageing clientele and competition from rail travel. Coach tour passengers fell from 2.3m in 1990 to 1.5m in 2015 and from 15% of tourism travel in 1980 to 5% in 2015.

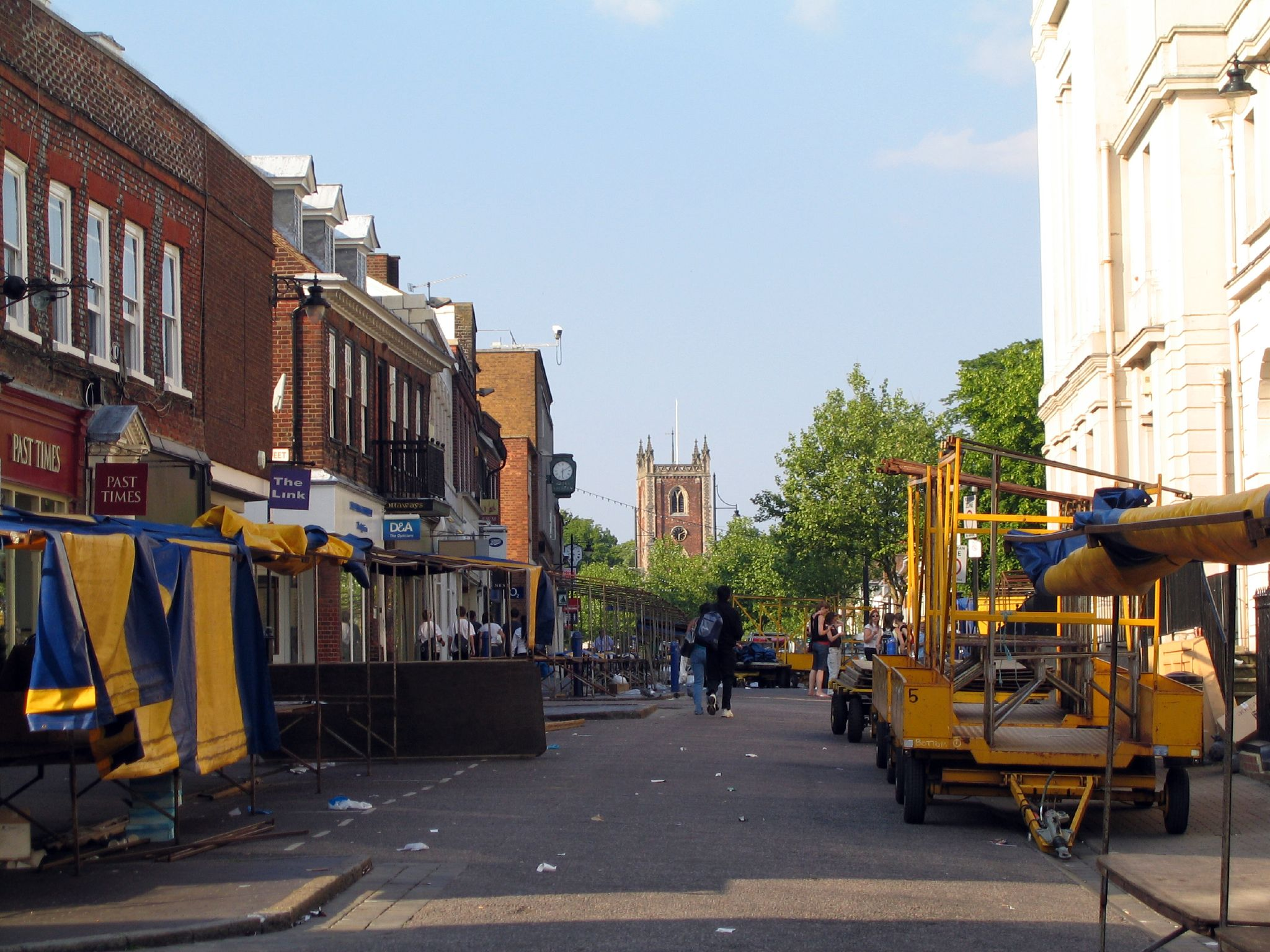
The Council’s stall team dismantling the stalls at the end of a market day

By the second decade of the twenty-first century, the increasing cost of putting up the stalls and the imposition of business rates on outdoor markets meant that St Albans Market was no longer generating revenue for the Council but now required a subsidy to continue.

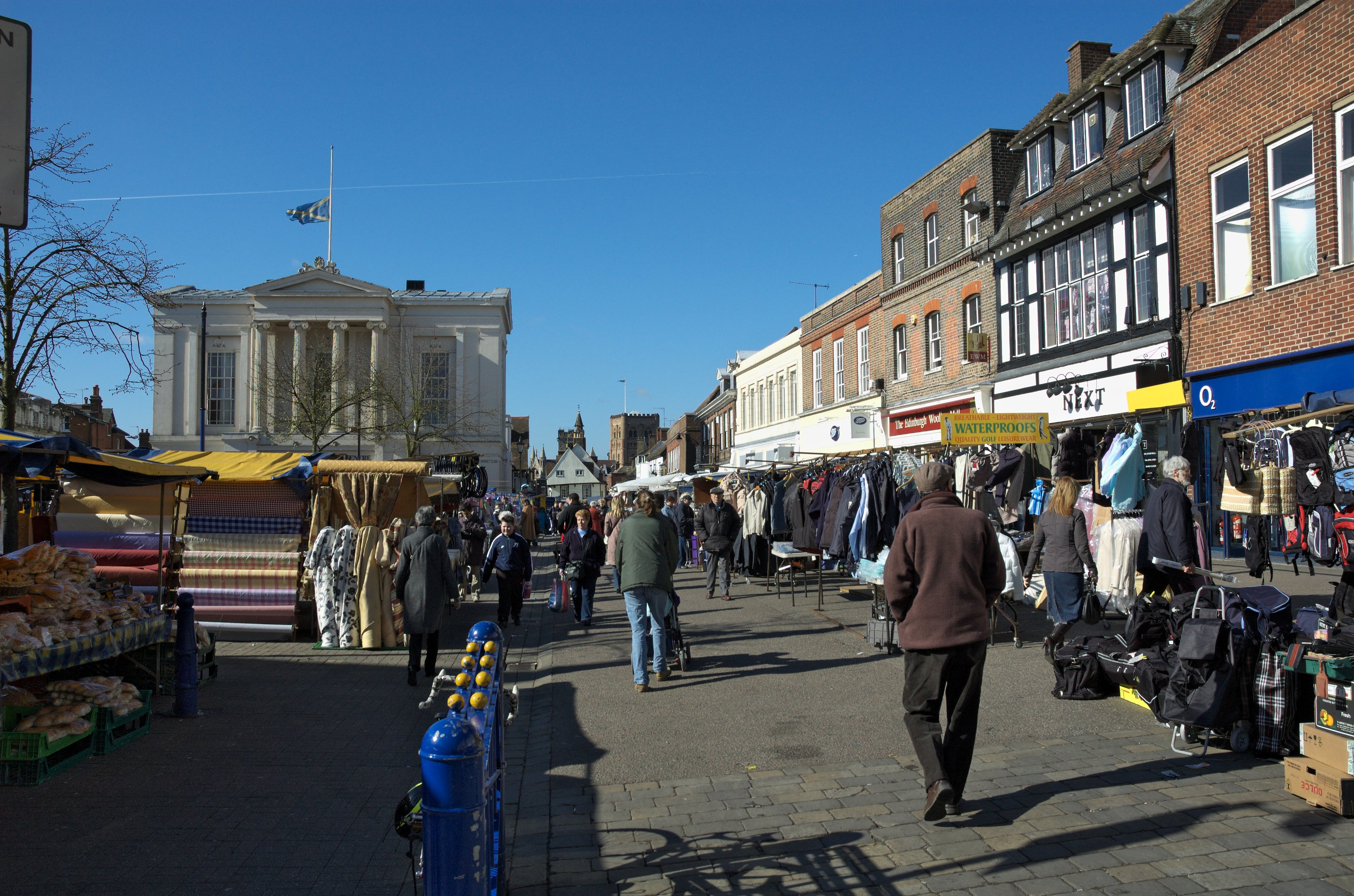
A view through the market, south west, towards Market Place with the Council supplied stalls

Market profits had been in decline for many years. In 2013–14 the combined income of the twice-weekly Charter Market and loss-making monthly Farmers' Market was 36 per cent lower than 2012–13 and 46 percent lower than 2011–12.

==== COVID-19 pandemic ====
In March 2020 at the onset of the pandemic, along with markets across the country, the market closed on 25 March and 28 March as restrictions were introduced to try to restrict the spread of the Severe acute respiratory syndrome 2 virus. The closure brought the issue of the market's losses to a head and the Council made the stall team redundant and mothballed the Market depot, the stalls, and the equipment used to put up the market.

The market reopened the following week for food traders only. Many of the traders received grants to purchase their own stall equipment and the market returned to being a traditional self-build market. The number of pitches were greatly reduced to facilitate social distancing. Social distancing rules were not relaxed until the end of July 2021 when the market started to slowly increase in size.

After an unsuccessful attempt to tender the market build to a private contractor, the Council postponed the tendering and continued with the self-build market.

==== Recovery ====
By 2023 the Council was reporting higher occupancy levels on the Saturday market than before the pandemic restrictions but that the Wednesday market remained smaller than in the past.

In 2024 St Albans Market was awarded Best Large Outdoor Market by the National Association of British Market Authorities.

It has recently been modernised in both layout and infrastructure as it has recovered out of the pandemic.

== Other markets in St Albans ==
In addition to the traditional Market and fairs, there are a number of other markets regulated under the part III of the Food Act 1984 (c. 30). On the second Sunday of each month a market with a heavier emphasis on local food and drink, sustainable, and arts and crafts. Two other Sunday markets are run by private operators, on the third Sunday of each month, Corky Events run an Antique and Vintage Market and four times a year The Vegan Market Co. hold a vegan food and produce market.

== Transport ==
=== Bus ===
230, 300, 301, 302, 304, 305, 357, 361, 602, 653 Tigermoth, S4, S5, and S6.

The management of bus services in Hertfordshire is managed by Intalink on behalf of Hertfordshire County Council.

=== Railway ===
The nearest stations are St Albans Abbey and St Albans City.

== See also ==
- St Albans Cathedral
- Clock Tower
- Corn Exchange
