= Corn Exchange, St Albans =

Commercial building in St Albans, England

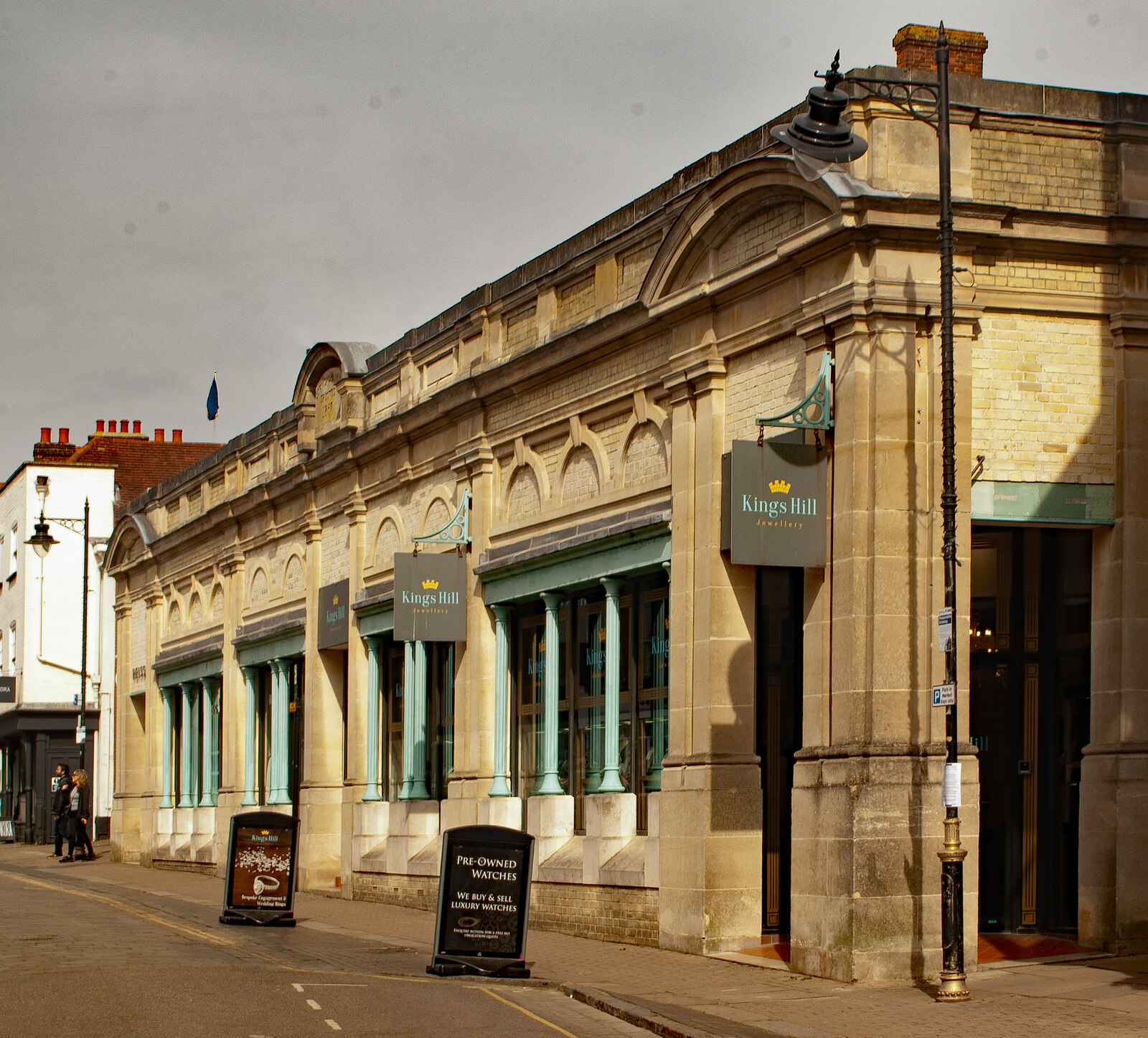
- Corn Exchange, St Albans

- Shown in Hertfordshire
- 51.7516°N 0.3398°W
- Location: Market Place, St Albans, Hertfordshire, England, UK

History
- Built: 1857
- Built for: St Albans Market
- Original use: Market hall

Site notes
- Architect: James Murray
- Architectural style: Italianate style
- Current use: Retail
- Owner: St Albans City and District Council

The Corn Exchange is a retail building in the Market Place, St Albans, Hertfordshire, England. The structure, which is now used to accommodate a pair of shops, is a locally listed building.

== History ==
The corn exchange was commissioned to replace an open-sided market hall, in the middle of the Market Place, just to the south of the Clock Tower, which dated back to around 1596. By the mid-19th century it had become dilapidated and the local merchants wanted a new structure. The site council officials selected was on the east side of the Market Place, close to the location of the market's medieval Wheat Cheping.

The new building was the subject of a design competition, held in 1854, which was won by James Murray, who later established the firm of Pugin & Murray in London. It was designed in the Italianate style "with details partaking of the Romanesque", built by Joseph Briggs in buff brick with stone dressings at a cost of £1,380, and was officially opened by the mayor, John Lewis, on 23 September 1857. The original design involved a symmetrical main frontage of thirteen bays facing onto the Market Place. The end bays contained openings flanked by pairs of Doric order pilasters supporting an entablature, a cornice and round headed pediments. The other bays contained round headed windows with architraves and keystones. At roof level there was a parapet and a central commemorative plaque, which was inscribed with the words "Corn Exchange, Erected 1857, John Lewis Esq Mayor" and was surmounted by a round headed pediment.

A serious dispute arose in 1859 when St Albans City Council sought to restrict the opening hours of the corn exchange but merchants simply broke into the building casting police officers aside.

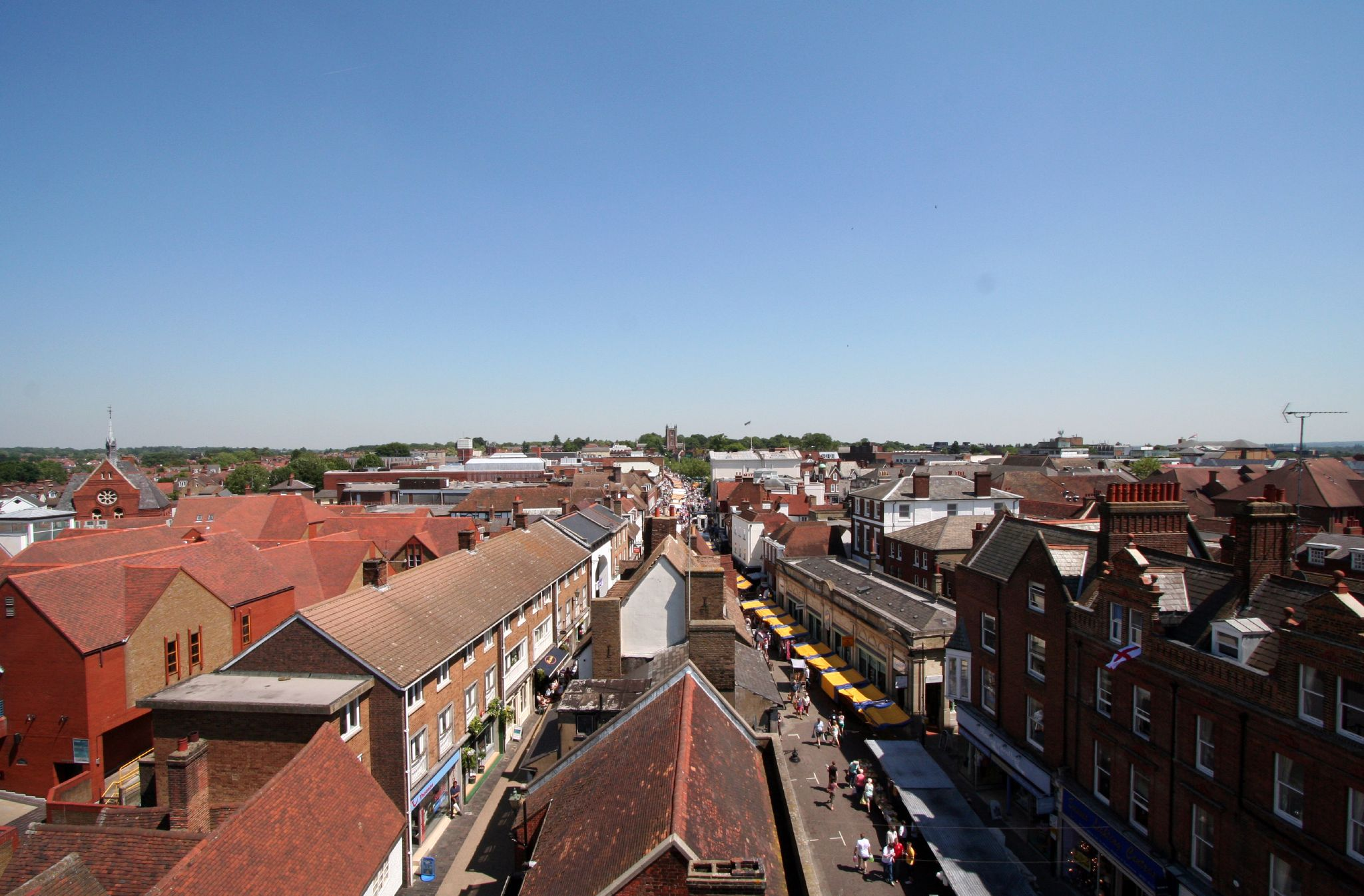
The Corn Exchange within St Albans Market in June 2006

The use of corn exchanges declined significantly in the wake of the Great Depression of British Agriculture in the late 19th century.

In 1888, Mr Richardson, the Corn Exchange keeper, said the corn market was held every Saturday afternoon. With 16 stall-holders paying £22 (equivalent to £2,472.3 in 2025) per annum each, the number having declined due to the depression in trade. The Corn Exchange building was also let for public meetings.

After the market closed the building became a shop, operated by, amongst others, Home and Colonial Stores. During the First World War it became the meeting place of the Belgian Refugee Committee and, later in the war, it was used as a National Kitchen. After the war it was converted into five shop units to a very crude design, causing significant damage to the original Italianate frontage. A major programme of refurbishment works to restore the frontage was completed in the mid-1990s. The works included the introduction of a new opening in the central bay as well as the introduction of better fenestration including bi-partite and tri-partite windows flanked by colonettes supporting lintels.

The building currently accommodates a clothing shop, Reiss and a local jewellery business, Kings Hill Jewellery.

== See also ==
- Clock Tower, St Albans
- Corn exchanges in England
- St Albans Market
