= Wulsin =

Wulsin may refer to:

== Given name ==
- Wulsin (Abbot Ulsinus), ninth- or tenth-century abbot of St Alban's Abbey, England
- Wulsin of Sherborne (died 973), monk, abbot, then Bishop of Sherborne

== Surname ==
- Janet Elliott Wulsin (1894–1963), American explorer
- Lawson Wulsin (born 1951), psychiatrist and author
- Lucien Wulsin III (1916–2009), American businessman and president of Baldwin Piano
- Seth Wulsin, American sculptor and musician
- Victoria Wells Wulsin, American epidemiologist and politician
