= Frederick George Kitton =

British wood-engraver, author and illustrator

Frederick George Kitton (5 May 1856 – 10 September 1904) was a British wood-engraver, author, and illustrator. He is best known for illustrating and editing the works of Charles Dickens.

== Life ==
Born at Norwich, Frederick George Kitton went at age seventeen to London as an apprentice and was trained as a draughtsman and wood-engraver by W. L. Thomas, the managing director of The Graphic and one of the leading practitioners of the technique at the time. Kitton contributed to several art periodicals, such as The Art Journal and Magazine of Art, and in 1882 began literary work. He illustrated, edited or wrote several books, most of which were related to the work of Charles Dickens. He annotated the 1900 'Rochester' edition of Dickens's work.

As one of the founders of the Dickens Fellowship, Kitton compiled the catalogue of their 1903 exhibition. His Dickensian library was purchased by the Fellowship and donated to the Guildhall Library. While living at St. Albans (1888–1904), Kitton helped the Hertfordshire County Museum acquire and catalog the Sir John Evans collection.

== Selected works ==
- "Phiz" (Hablot Knight Browne) a memoir. Including a selection from his correspondence and notes on his principal works. By Fred G. Kitton. With a portrait and numerous illustrations. 1882.
- John Leech, artist and humorist: a biographical sketch. 1883.
- Dickensiana: a bibliography of the literature relating to Charles Dickens and his writings. 1886.
- A Supplement to Charles Dickens by pen and pencil; including anecdotes and reminiscences collected from his friends and contemporaries. 1890.
- Old lamps for new ones, and other sketches and essays hitherto uncollected. Edited, with an introd., by Frederick G. Kitton. 1897.
- St. Alban's abbey, by the Rev. Edward Liddell; illustrated by F. G. Kitton. 1897.
- Dickens and his Illustrators. 1899.; 2nd edition. 1903.
- Zechariah Buck, MUS.D., cantor, organist and master of the choristers at Norwich cathedral, 1817-1877. 1899.
- Minor Writings of Charles Dickens. 1900.
- St. Albans, historical & picturesque. With an account of the Roman city of Verulamium. By Charles H. Ashdown. Illustrated by Frederic G. Kitton. 1893.
- Charles Dickens, his Life, Writings, and Personality. 1901.
- Dickens exhibition held at the Memorial Hall, London, March 25th, 26th, and 27th, 1903, opened by Percy Fitzgerald ... Catalogue of exhibits, comp. and ed. by F.G. Kitton. 1903.
- Poems and verses of Charles Dickens; collected and ed., with bibliographical notes, by F. G. Kitton. 1903.
- The Dickens Country. 1905.; 2nd edition. 1911.
