= List of schools in St Albans =

A list of schools in St Albans, Hertfordshire, England:

== Independent schools ==
School	Gender	Age range	Religious affiliation	Location	School website
St Albans School	Boys	11–18	Christian	AL3	http://www.st-albans.herts.sch.uk/
St Albans High School for Girls	Girls	4–18	Christian	AL1	http://www.stahs.org.uk/
St Columba's College	Mixed	4–18	Roman Catholic	AL3	http://stcolumbascollege.org/
St Albans Independent College	Mixed	14-21	None	AL1	https://www.stalbanscollege.co.uk/

== State schools ==
Primary schools

School	Gender	Age range	Religious affiliation	Location	School website
The Abbey CE VA Primary School	Mixed	4–11	Church of England	AL1	http://www.abbey.herts.sch.uk/
Aboyne Lodge Primary and Nursery School	Mixed	3–11	Does not apply	AL3	http://www.aboyne.herts.sch.uk/
Alban City School	Mixed	4–11	Does not apply	AL1	http://albancityschool.org.uk/
Bernards Heath Infant School	Mixed	3–7	Does not apply	AL1	http://www.bernardsheath.herts.sch.uk/
Bernards Heath Junior School	Mixed	7–11	Does not apply	AL3	http://www.bernardsheathjnr.herts.sch.uk/
Camp Primary and Nursery School	Mixed	3–11	Does not apply	AL1	http://www.camp.herts.sch.uk/
Cunningham Hill Infant School	Mixed	4–7	Does not apply	AL1	http://cunninghaminfants.herts.sch.uk/
Cunningham Hill Junior School	Mixed	7–11	Does not apply	AL1	http://www.cunninghamhill-jun.herts.sch.uk/
Fleetville Infant and Nursery School	Mixed	3–7	Does not apply	AL1	http://www.fleetvilleinfants.herts.sch.uk/
Fleetville Junior School	Mixed	7–11	Does not apply	AL1	http://www.fleetvillejm.herts.sch.uk/
Garden Fields JMI	Mixed	5–11	Does not apply	AL3	http://www.gardenfields.herts.sch.uk/
Killigrew Primary and Nursery School	Mixed	3–11	Does not apply	AL2	http://www.killigrew.herts.sch.uk/
Mandeville Primary School	Mixed	3–11	Does not apply	AL1	http://www.mandeville.herts.sch.uk/
Maple School	Mixed	4–11	Does not apply	AL1	http://www.maple.herts.sch.uk/
Margaret Wix Primary	Mixed	3–11	Does not apply	AL3	http://www.margaretwix.herts.sch.uk/
Oakwood Primary School	Mixed	4–11	Does not apply	AL4	http://www.oakwood.herts.sch.uk/
Prae Wood Primary School	Mixed	3-11	Does not apply	AL3	http://www.praewood.herts.sch.uk/
St Adrian Roman Catholic Primary School	Mixed	3–11	Roman Catholic	AL1	http://www.stadrians.herts.sch.uk/
St Alban and St Stephen RC Infant & Nursery School	Mixed	3–7	Roman Catholic	AL1	http://www.ssasinfants.herts.sch.uk/
St Alban and St Stephen Catholic Junior School	Mixed	7–11	Roman Catholic	AL1	http://www.ssasjm.herts.sch.uk/
St Michael's C of E VA Primary School	Mixed	4–11	Church of England	AL3	http://www.stmichaels.herts.sch.uk/
St John Fisher Primary School	Mixed	4–11	Roman Catholic	AL4	http://www.sjfisher.herts.sch.uk/
St Peter's School	Mixed	3–11	Does not apply	AL1	http://www.stpeters.herts.sch.uk/
Wheatfields Infants' and Nursery School	Mixed	3–7	Does not apply	AL4	http://www.wheatfieldsinfants.herts.sch.uk/
Wheatfields Junior School	Mixed	7–11	Does not apply	AL4	http://www.wheatfieldsjm.herts.sch.uk/
Windermere Primary School	Mixed	5–11	Does not apply	AL1	http://www.windermere.herts.sch.uk/

Secondary schools

School	Gender	Age Range	Religious Affiliation	Location	School website
Beaumont School	Mixed	11–18	Does not apply	AL4	http://www.beaumontschool.com/
Loreto College	Girls	11–18	Roman Catholic	AL1	http://www.loreto.herts.sch.uk/
Marlborough Science Academy	Mixed	11–18	Does not apply	AL1	http://www.themarlboroughscienceacademy.co.uk/
Nicholas Breakspear Catholic School	Mixed	11–18	Roman Catholic	AL4	https://www.nbs.herts.sch.uk/
Sandringham School	Mixed	11–18	Does not apply	AL4	http://www.sandringham.herts.sch.uk
St Albans Girls' School	Girls	11–18	Does not apply	AL3	http://www.stags.herts.sch.uk/
Samuel Ryder Academy	Mixed	4–19	Does not apply	AL1	http://www.samuelryderacademy.co.uk/
Townsend School	Mixed	11–18	Church of England	AL3	http://www.townsend.herts.sch.uk/
Verulam School	Boys	11–18	Does not apply	AL1	http://www.verulamschool.co.uk
