= St Albans =

City in southern Hertfordshire, England

- Cathedral city
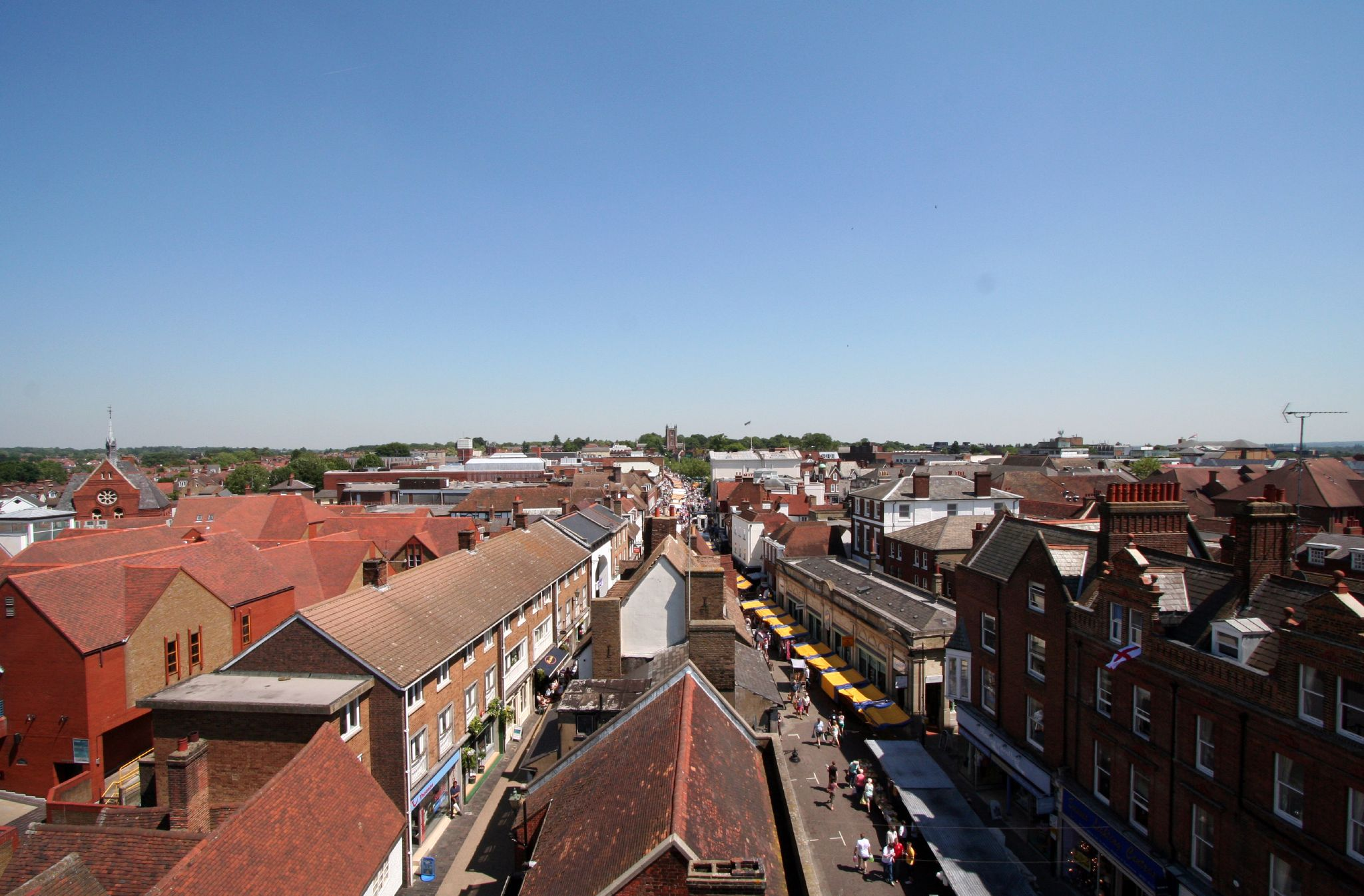
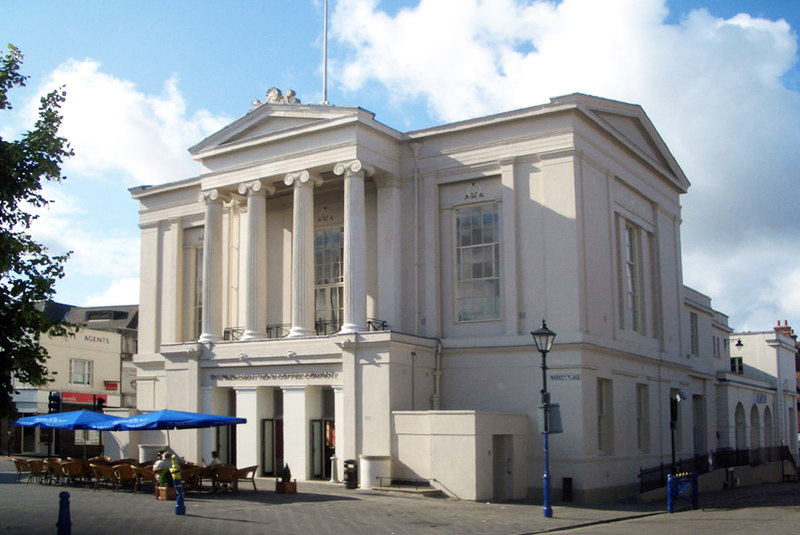
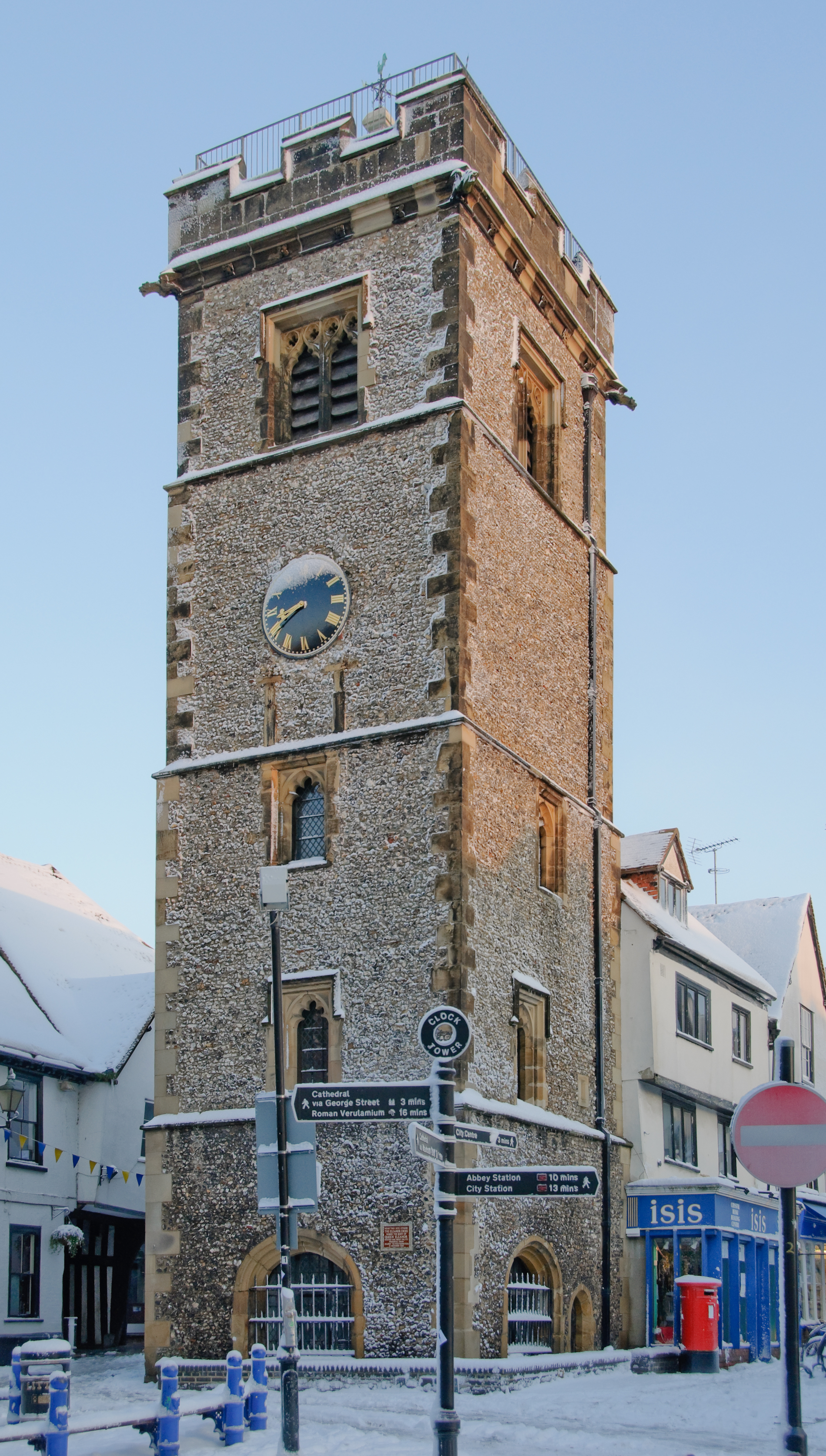
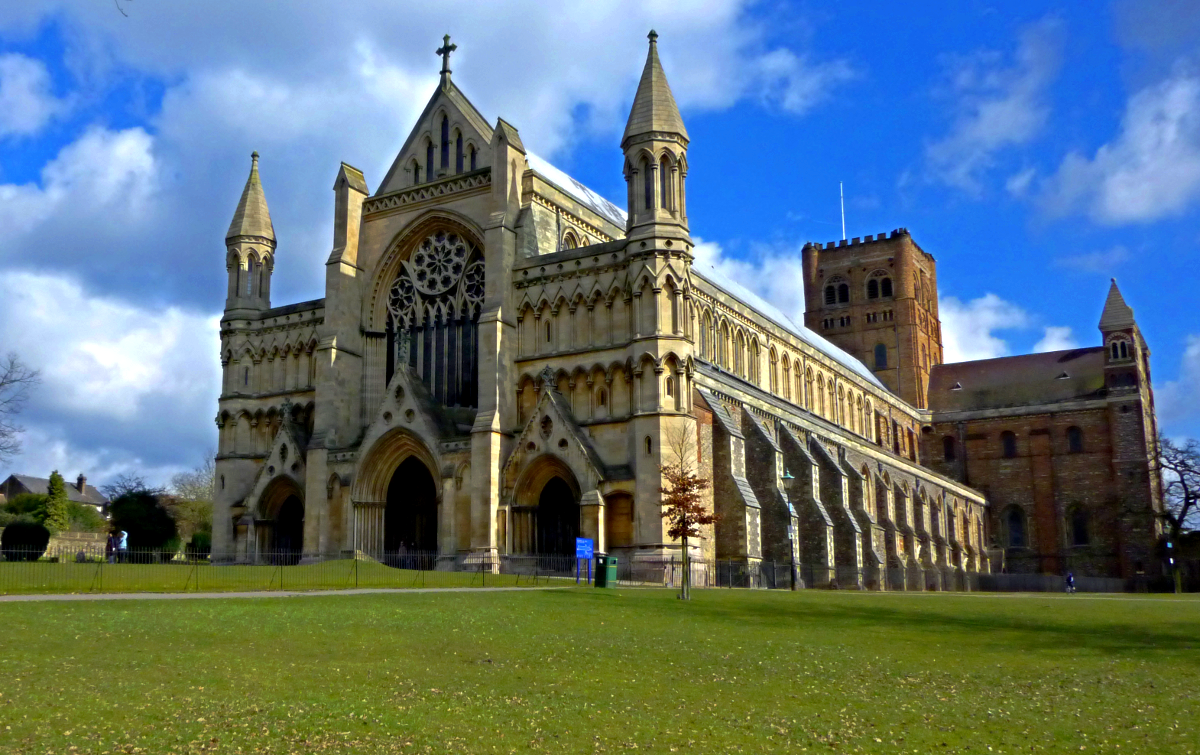
- From the top: View over the Marketplace, The Town Hall, The Clock Tower and St Albans Cathedral

- Coat of Arms

- Location within Hertfordshire
- Area: 6.99 sq mi (18.1 km^{2})
- Population: 82,146
  - Density: 11,752/sq mi (4,537/km^{2})
- OS grid reference: TL148073
  - London: 19 mi (31 km) SSE
- District: St Albans
- Shire county: Hertfordshire
- Region: East
- Country: England
- Sovereign state: United Kingdom
- Post town: ST. ALBANS
- Postcode district: AL1-AL4
- Dialling code: 01727
- Police: Hertfordshire
- Fire: Hertfordshire
- Ambulance: East of England
- UK Parliament: St Albans

St Albans (/sənt ˈɔːlbənz/) is a cathedral city in Hertfordshire, England, east of Hemel Hempstead and west of Hatfield, 20 miles (32 km) north-west of London, 8 miles (13 km) south-west of Welwyn Garden City and 11 miles (18 km) south-east of Luton. St Albans was the first major town on the old Roman road of Watling Street for travellers heading north and became the city of Verulamium. It has a population of 82,146.

== Name ==
St Albans takes its name from the first British saint, Alban. The most elaborate version of his story, in Bede's Ecclesiastical History of the English People, relates that he lived in Verulamium, sometime during the 3rd or 4th century, when Christians were suffering persecution. Alban met a Christian priest fleeing from his persecutors and sheltered him in his house, where he became so impressed with the priest's piety that he converted to Christianity. When the authorities searched Alban's house, he put on the priest's cloak and presented himself in place of his guest. Consequently, he was sentenced to endure the punishments that were to be inflicted upon the priest, unless he renounced Christianity. Alban refused and was taken for execution. In later legends, his head rolled downhill after execution and a well sprang up where it stopped.

== History ==
=== Iron Age ===
There was an Iron Age settlement known as Verlamion, or Verlamio, near the site of the present city, the centre of Tasciovanus' power and a major centre of the Catuvellauni from about 20 BC until shortly after the Roman invasion of AD 43. The name "Verlamion" is Celtic, meaning "settlement over or by the marsh". The town was on Prae Hill, 2 km (1.2 mi) to the west of modern St Albans, now covered by the village of St Michael's, Verulamium Park and the Gorhambury Estate. Although excavations done in 1996 produced finds which include silver coins from the Roman Republic era dating from 90/80 BC, there was evidence of trade with the Republic and that a settlement already existed on the site 50 years before Julius Caesar attempted to invade Britain. However, it is believed that the tribal capital was moved to the site by Tasciovanus (around 25 to 5 BC). Cunobelinus may have constructed Beech Bottom Dyke, a defensive earthwork near the settlement whose significance is uncertain.

=== Roman ===
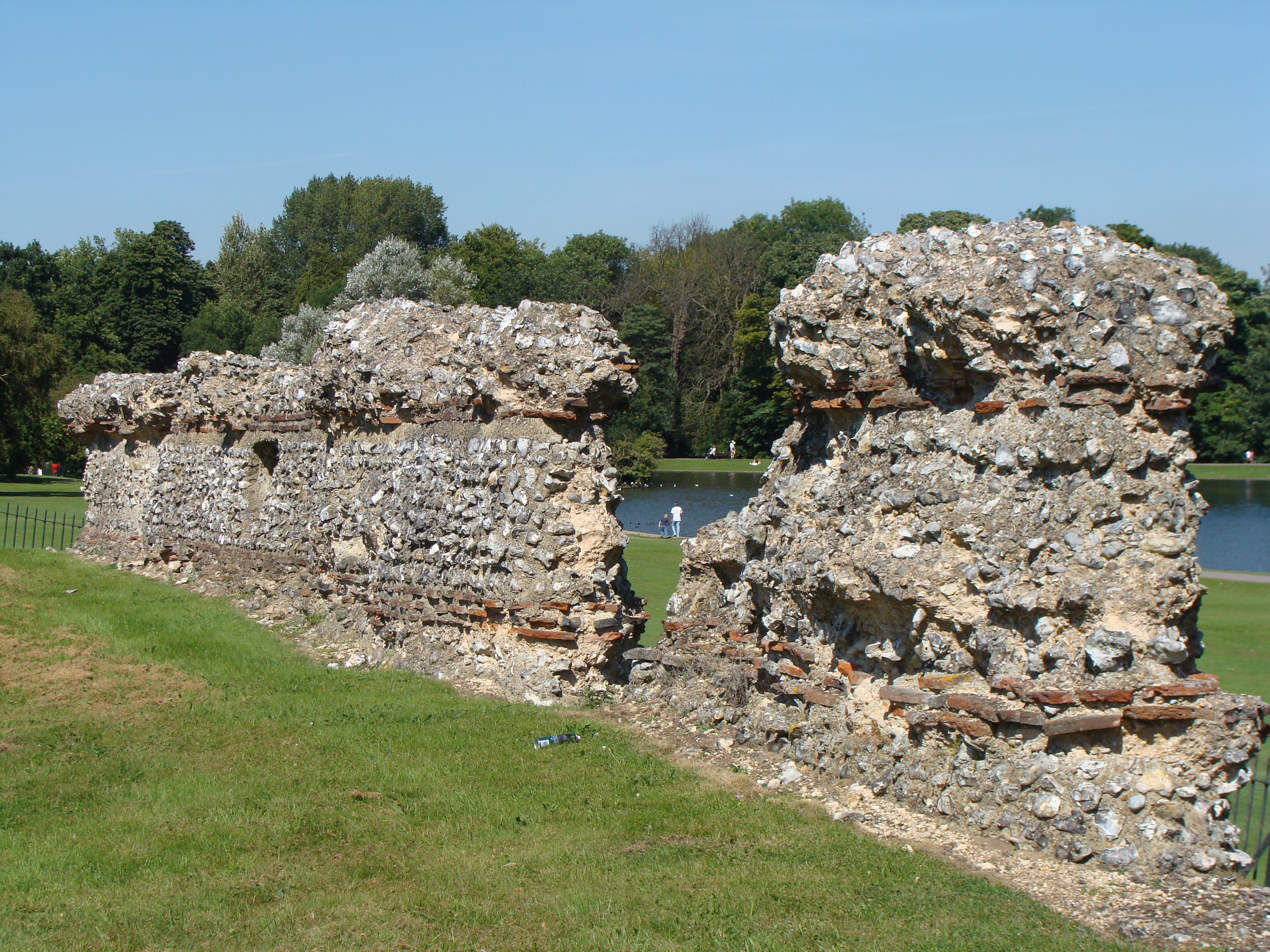
Remains of Roman wall

The Roman city of Verulamium, the second-largest town in Roman Britain after Londinium, developed from the Iron Age settlement and was granted the rank of municipium around AD 50, meaning that its citizens had what were known as "Latin Rights", a lesser citizenship status than a colonia possessed. It grew to a significant town, and as such received the attentions of Boudica of the Iceni in 61, when Verulamium was sacked and burnt on her orders. Excavations preceding the museum's new entrance done in 1996–97 within the centre of the Roman town gave archaeologists the chance to date a black ash layer to 60–65 AD, thus confirming the Roman written record. It grew steadily; by the early 3rd century, it covered an area of about 125 acres (51 ha), behind a deep ditch and wall. Verulamium contained a forum, basilica and a theatre, much of which were damaged during two fires, one in 155 and the other in around 250. These were repaired and continued in use in the 4th century. The theatre was disused by the end of the 4th century. One of the few extant Roman inscriptions in Britain is found on the remnants of the forum (see Verulamium Forum inscription). The town was rebuilt in stone rather than timber at least twice over the next 150 years. Roman occupation ended between 400 and 450 AD.

The body of St Alban was probably buried outside the city walls in a Roman cemetery near the present cathedral. His hillside grave became a place of pilgrimage. Recent investigation has uncovered a basilica there, indicating the oldest continuous site of Christian worship in Great Britain. In 429 Germanus of Auxerre visited the church and subsequently promoted the cult of St Alban.

A few traces of the Roman city remain visible, such as parts of the city walls, a hypocaust – still in situ under a mosaic floor, and the theatre, which is on land belonging to the Earl of Verulam, as well as items in the museum. Further remains beneath nearby agricultural land have only had a few exploratory trenches, which have never been fully excavated and were seriously threatened by deep ploughing, which ceased in 2005 after compensation was agreed. Test trenches in 2003 confirmed that serious damage had occurred to buildings on the northern side of Old Watling Street by deep ploughing. Permission needs to be granted to enable the full extent of the damage to the western half of Verulamium to be investigated.

=== Anglo-Saxon ===
After the Roman withdrawal the town became the centre of the territory or regio of the Anglo-Saxon Waeclingas tribe.

St Albans Abbey and the associated Anglo-Saxon settlement were founded on the hill outside the Roman city where it was believed St Alban was buried. An archaeological excavation in 1978, directed by Martin Biddle, failed to find Roman remains on the site of the medieval chapter house. As late as the eighth century the Saxon inhabitants of St Albans nearby were aware of their ancient neighbour, which they knew alternatively as Verulamacæstir or, under what H. R. Loyn terms "their own hybrid", Vaeclingscæstir, "the fortress of the followers of Wæcla", possibly a pocket of British-speakers remaining separate in an increasingly Saxonised area.

=== Medieval ===
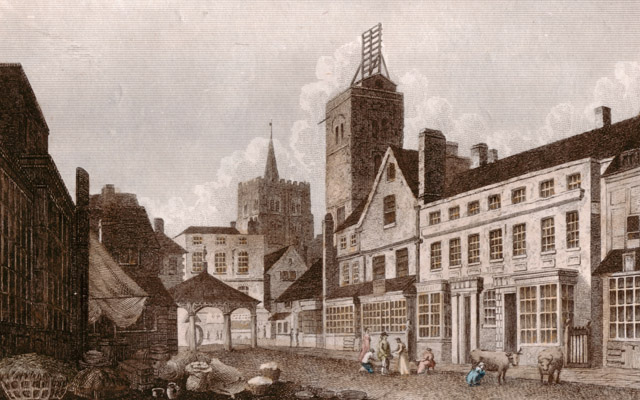
St Albans High Street in 1807, showing the shutter telegraph on top of the city's Clock Tower

The medieval town grew on the hill to the east of Wæclingacaester where the Benedictine Abbey of St Albans was founded by Ulsinus in 793. There is some evidence that the original site was higher up the hill than the present building, which was begun in 1077. St Albans Abbey was the principal medieval abbey in England. The scribe Matthew Vickers lived there and the first draft of Magna Carta was drawn up there. It became a parish church after the dissolution of the Benedictine abbey in 1539 and was made a cathedral in 1877.

St Albans School was founded in AD 948. Matthew Paris was educated there and until 2025 it was the only school in the English-speaking world to have educated a Pope (Adrian IV). Now a public school it has, since 1871, occupied a site to the west of the Abbey and includes the 14th-century Abbey Gateway. One of its buildings was a hat factory, a link with the city's industrial past.

On Abbey Mill Lane, the road between the Abbey and the school, are the palaces of the Bishops of St Albans and Hertford and Ye Olde Fighting Cocks, claimed to be the oldest pub in England.

Between 1403 and 1412 Thomas Wolvey was engaged to build a clock tower in the Market Place. It is the only extant medieval town belfry in England. The original bell, named for the Archangel Gabriel sounds F-natural and weighs one ton. Gabriel sounded at 4 am for the Angelus and at 8 or 9 pm for the curfew. The ground floor of the tower was a shop until the 20th century. The first- and second-floor rooms were designed as living chambers. The shop and the first floor were connected by a flight of spiral stairs. Another flight rises the whole height of the tower by 93 narrow steps and gave access to the living chamber, the clock and the bell without disturbing the tenant of the shop.

Two battles of the Wars of the Roses took place in or near the town. The First Battle of St Albans was fought on 22 May 1455 within the town, and the Second Battle of St Albans was fought on 17 February 1461, just to the north.

A street market on Wednesdays and Saturdays, founded by Abbot Ulsinus, still flourishes. In 1553, Henry VIII's son Edward VI sold the right to hold the market to a group of local merchants and landowners via letters patent which also incorporated St Albans as a borough. The old market hall, which dated from around 1596, was replaced by the Corn Exchange in 1857.

=== Modern ===
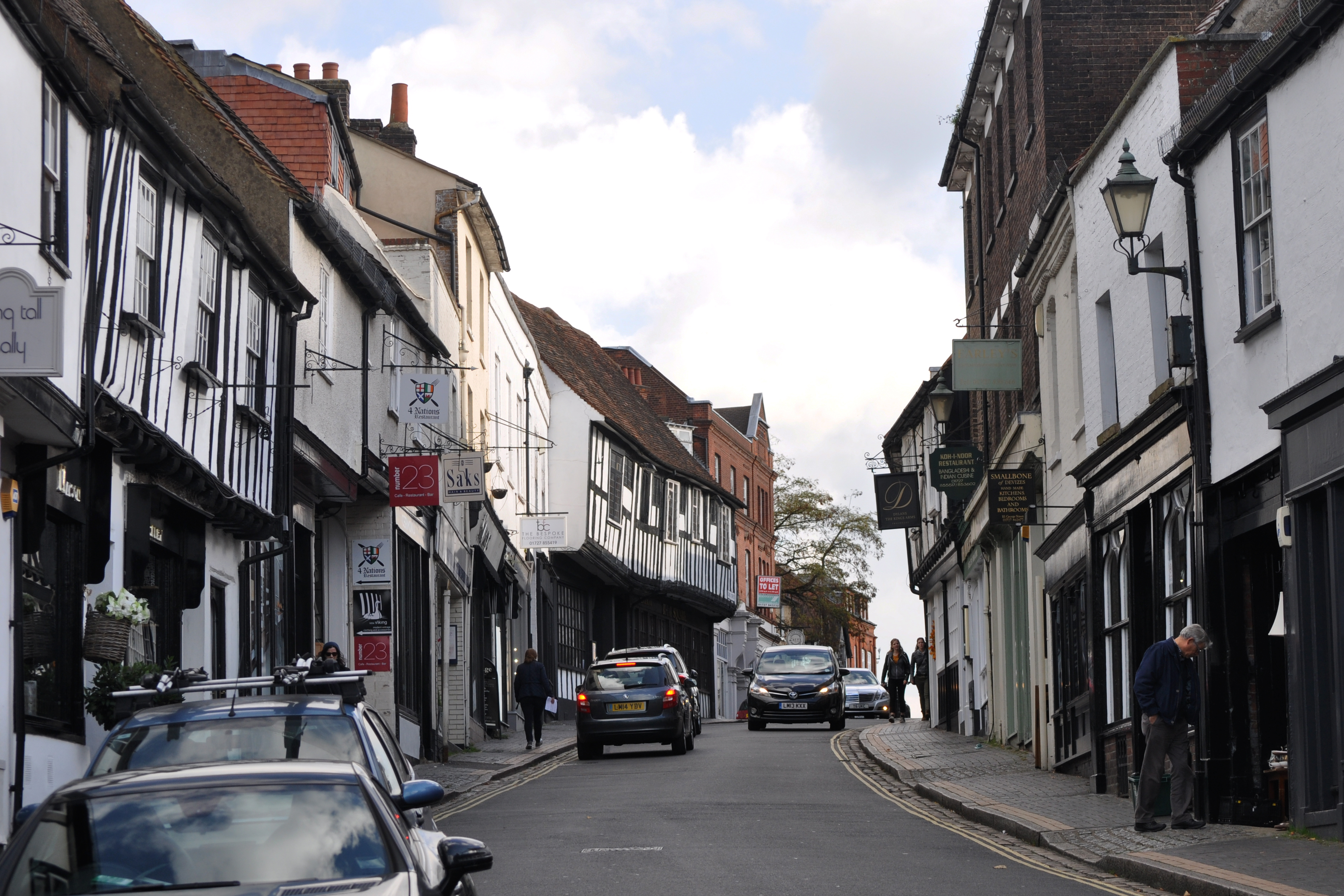
Tudor buildings on George Street

Before the 20th century St Albans was a rural market town, a Christian pilgrimage site, and the first coaching stop of the route to and from London to the north, accounting for its numerous old inns. Victorian St Albans was small and had little industry. Its population grew more slowly than London, 8–9% per decade between 1801 and 1861, compared to the 31% per decade growth of London in the same period. The railway arrived in 1858. In 1869 the extension of the city boundaries was opposed by the Earl of Verulam and many of the townsfolk, but there was rapid expansion and much building at the end of the century, and between 1891 and 1901 the population grew by 37%.

In 1877, in response to a public petition, Queen Victoria issued the second royal charter, which granted city status to the borough and Cathedral status to the former Abbey Church. The new diocese was established in the same year, in the main from parts of the large Diocese of Rochester.

In the inter-war years it became a centre for the electronics industry. In the post-World War II years it expanded rapidly as part of the post-War redistribution of population out of Greater London. It is now a popular tourist destination.

== Governance ==
St Albans has two tiers of local government, at district and county level: St Albans City and District Council and Hertfordshire County Council. The main part of the urban area of St Albans (the pre-1974 borough) is an unparished area, directly administered by the city/district and county councils.

=== Past ===
St Albans
- Ancient borough (1553–1835); Municipal borough (1836–1974)
- History
  - Created: 12 May 1553 (Ancient borough); 1 January 1836 (Municipal borough)
  - Abolished: 31 March 1974
  - Succeeded by: St Albans City and District
  - HQ: St Albans
- Contained within
  - County Council: Hertfordshire

The early administrative history of the town of St Albans is closely tied to St Albans Abbey. The town was effectively controlled by the abbey through the Middle Ages, but there were frequent disputes between the abbot and townspeople about the extent of the abbey's powers in the town. Following the dissolution of the abbey in 1539, the rights previously held by it passed to the crown. On 12 May 1553 the town was granted a charter by Edward VI, incorporating it as a borough with a mayor.

The borough consisted of the ancient parish of St Albans (also known as the Abbey parish) and parts of the parishes of St Michael and St Peter. The borough was reformed by the Municipal Corporations Act 1835 to become a municipal borough, and the boundary was adjusted to additionally include part of the parish of St Stephen. On 28 August 1877 the borough gained city status, following the elevation of St Albans Abbey to become a cathedral. The boundary was also adjusted in 1877 to include part of the parish of Sandridge.

The Local Government Act 1894 divided parishes that were partly within municipal boroughs. The parts of St Michael, St Peter and Sandridge within the borough became the new parishes of St Michael Urban, St Peter Urban and Sandridge Urban. The part of St Stephen within the borough was absorbed by the parish of St Albans. The parishes that were formed outside the borough, that is St Michael Rural, St Peter Rural, Sandridge Rural and the reduced St Stephen, became part of St Albans Rural District on 28 December 1894.

St Albans Town Hall was built between 1829 and 1831 and served as the council's meeting place until the 1960s, when the council moved to new premises at the City Hall and adjoining buildings.

In 1898 the parish of St Albans absorbed St Michael Urban, St Peter Urban and Sandridge Urban so the parish and borough occupied the same area. In 1901 the population of the borough was 16,019, growing to 18,133 in 1911. St Albans expanded in 1913 by gaining parts of Sandridge Rural (241 acres), St Michael Rural (138 acres), St Peter Rural (992 acres) and St Stephen (335 acres). In 1921 the population of the enlarged borough was 25,593, growing to 28,624 in 1931. It expanded again in 1935 as part of a county review order gaining more of St Michael Rural (890 acres), St Peter Rural (436 acres) and St Stephen (712 acres). The population of the borough was 44,098 in 1951 and 50,293 in 1961.

=== Present ===
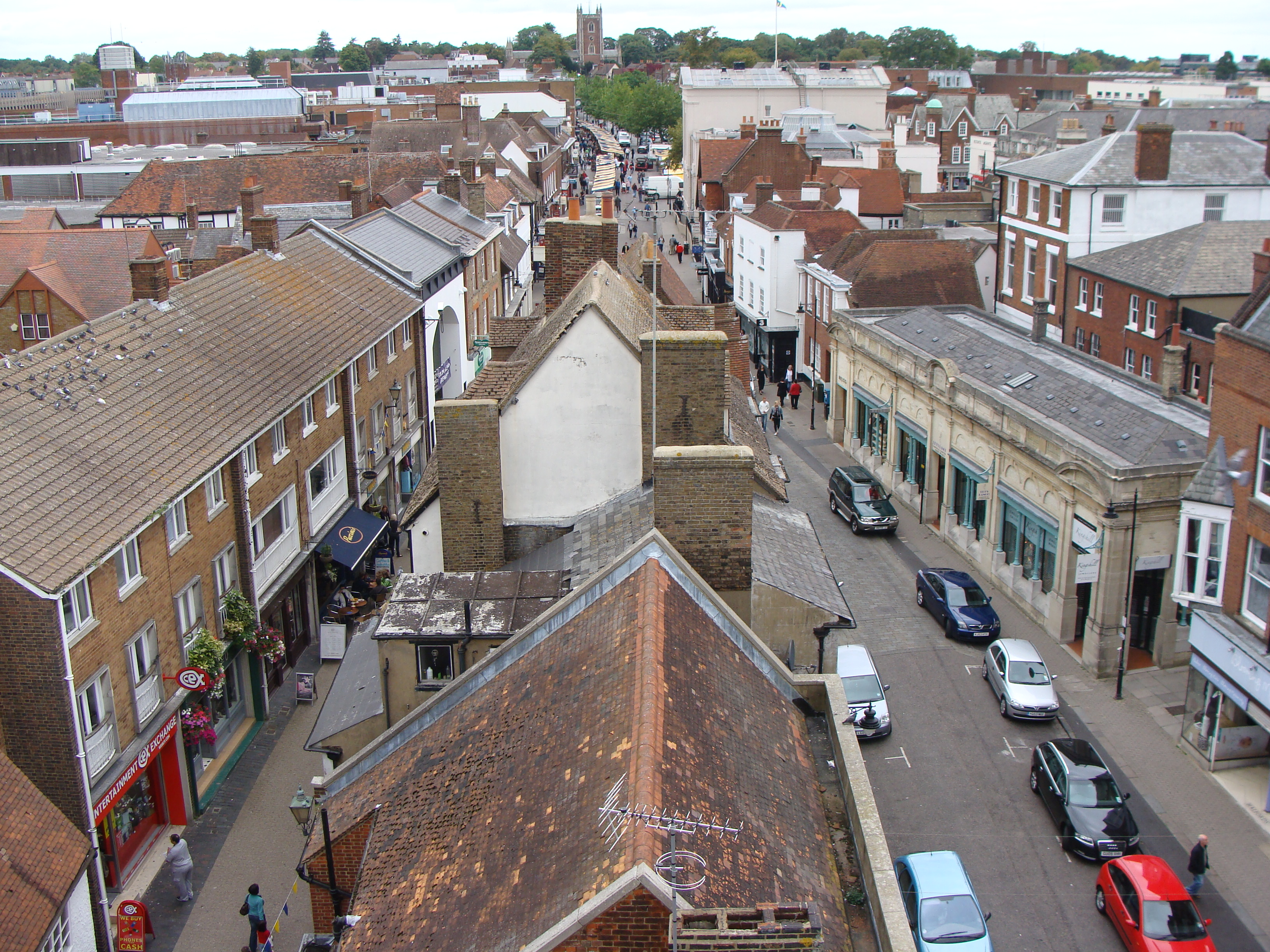
St Albans viewed from the Clock Tower: French Row (to the left), Market Place (to the right), St Peter's Street and the tower of St Peter's Church (centre)

The borough was abolished on 1 April 1974 and St Albans became part of the new, larger St Albans City and District. City status was transferred to the entire district by letters patent dated 9 July 1974. Local government services are now provided by Hertfordshire County Council (strategic services) and St Albans City and District Council. Eight local parish councils (limited local services) cover the parts of St Albans City and District that were previously in St Albans Rural District and Harpenden Urban District, but the area that was St Albans Borough prior to 1974 is an unparished area. Within this area, (the Ashley, Batchwood, Clarence, Cunningham, Marshalswick South, St Peters, Sopwell and Verulam wards) a City Neighbourhood Committee of the district council was set up in June 2013 with comparable responsibilities to parish councils for small parks, playgrounds, open spaces, war memorials, allotments and public conveniences. The City and District Council built a new civic centre in 1989 adjoining the 1960s City Hall complex, which became known instead as the Alban Arena.

=== Parliamentary representation ===
St Albans is part of the homonymous parliamentary constituency represented in the House of Commons of the Parliament of the United Kingdom. Established in 1885, it is a county constituency in Hertfordshire, and elects one Member of Parliament (MP) by the first past the post system of election.

== Geography ==
=== Climate ===
St Albans has an oceanic climate (Köppen climate classification Cfb) similar to most of the United Kingdom.

Climate data for Rothamsted WMO ID: 03680; coordinates 51°48′24″N 0°21′37″W; elevation: 128 m (420 ft); 1991–2020 normals, extremes 1914–present
Month	Jan	Feb	Mar	Apr	May	Jun	Jul	Aug	Sep	Oct	Nov	Dec	Year
Record high °C (°F)	14.2 (57.6)	18.2 (64.8)	22.3 (72.1)	26.8 (80.2)	32.5 (90.5)	34.3 (93.7)	38.5 (101.3)	35.6 (96.1)	31.0 (87.8)	26.8 (80.2)	17.3 (63.1)	15.3 (59.5)	38.5 (101.3)
Mean daily maximum °C (°F)	7.1 (44.8)	7.6 (45.7)	10.3 (50.5)	13.4 (56.1)	16.6 (61.9)	19.6 (67.3)	22.1 (71.8)	21.7 (71.1)	18.6 (65.5)	14.3 (57.7)	10.1 (50.2)	7.4 (45.3)	14.1 (57.4)
Daily mean °C (°F)	4.3 (39.7)	4.6 (40.3)	6.6 (43.9)	9.0 (48.2)	11.9 (53.4)	14.9 (58.8)	17.2 (63.0)	17.0 (62.6)	14.4 (57.9)	10.9 (51.6)	7.2 (45.0)	4.7 (40.5)	10.2 (50.4)
Mean daily minimum °C (°F)	1.6 (34.9)	1.5 (34.7)	2.8 (37.0)	4.5 (40.1)	7.3 (45.1)	10.2 (50.4)	12.3 (54.1)	12.3 (54.1)	10.1 (50.2)	7.5 (45.5)	4.2 (39.6)	2.0 (35.6)	6.4 (43.5)
Record low °C (°F)	−16.7 (1.9)	−13.6 (7.5)	−12.2 (10.0)	−6.2 (20.8)	−2.8 (27.0)	0.0 (32.0)	2.8 (37.0)	3.1 (37.6)	−0.6 (30.9)	−4.7 (23.5)	−7.5 (18.5)	−17.0 (1.4)	−17.0 (1.4)
Average precipitation mm (inches)	67.6 (2.66)	50.9 (2.00)	42.7 (1.68)	51.2 (2.02)	51.2 (2.02)	52.9 (2.08)	52.2 (2.06)	68.2 (2.69)	55.4 (2.18)	78.2 (3.08)	76.8 (3.02)	67.2 (2.65)	714.5 (28.13)
Average precipitation days (≥ 1.0 mm)	12.2	10.4	9.2	9.5	8.4	8.3	8.5	9.5	8.9	11.4	12.1	11.8	120.2
Mean monthly sunshine hours	60.0	78.3	119.1	165.9	202.5	205.2	209.0	194.4	149.8	111.5	69.2	56.0	1,620.9
Source 1: Met Office
Source 2: KNMI

=== Neighbourhoods ===
- Batchwood
- Bernards Heath
- Chiswell Green
- Cell Barnes
- Cottonmill
- Fleetville
- Hill End
- Jersey Farm
- Marshalswick (also extends into Sandridge parish)
- New Greens
- Sopwell
- St Julians
- St Stephens (not to be confused with St Stephen)
- The Camp
- Townsend

=== Nearby towns and villages ===
- Other nearby towns: Borehamwood, Luton, Stevenage, Berkhamsted, Barnet (historically a separate town, part of Greater London since the 1960s)
- Nearby villages: Abbots Langley, Kings Langley, Bricket Wood, Colney Heath, Elstree, Frogmore, Lemsford, London Colney, Markyate, Park Street, Radlett, Redbourn, Sandridge, Wheathampstead, Shenley
- Nearby hamlets: Chiswell Green, Colney Street

== Transport ==
=== Road ===
St Albans is north-east of the intersection between the M1 and M25 motorways. On the M1, its northern, central and southern junctions are 9, 7 and 6, respectively; on the M25, its western and eastern junctions are 21A and 22 respectively.

Notable A-roads serving the city include:

- The A414, which runs directly south of St Albans between Hemel Hempstead and Hatfield and links to M1 Junction 7/8;
- The A405, which provides a direct link to Watford via M25 junction 21A and M1 junction 6;
- The A5183 which runs north-west towards M1 junction 9 and Dunstable and south towards Edgware in north London; it forms the detrunked section of the London-Holyhead A5 road.

=== Railway ===
Two railway stations serve the city:

- St Albans City, which is situated 0.5 miles (800 m) east of the city centre. It lies on the Midland Main Line and is served by Thameslink services on a frequent and fast rail link to central London. Suburban services stop at all stations on the route, while express services are non-stop to London St Pancras. Trains run northbound to Harpenden, Luton, Luton Airport Parkway and Bedford.
- St Albans Abbey, which is situated approximately 0.7 miles (1 km) south-west of City station. It is the eastern terminus of the Abbey line from Watford Junction.

=== Buses ===
St Albans is well served by local buses, with frequent services to local villages and major towns including Watford, Harpenden and Luton. Routes are operated predominantly run by Arriva Herts & Essex, Uno, Red Eagle and Sullivan Buses.

== Culture and media ==
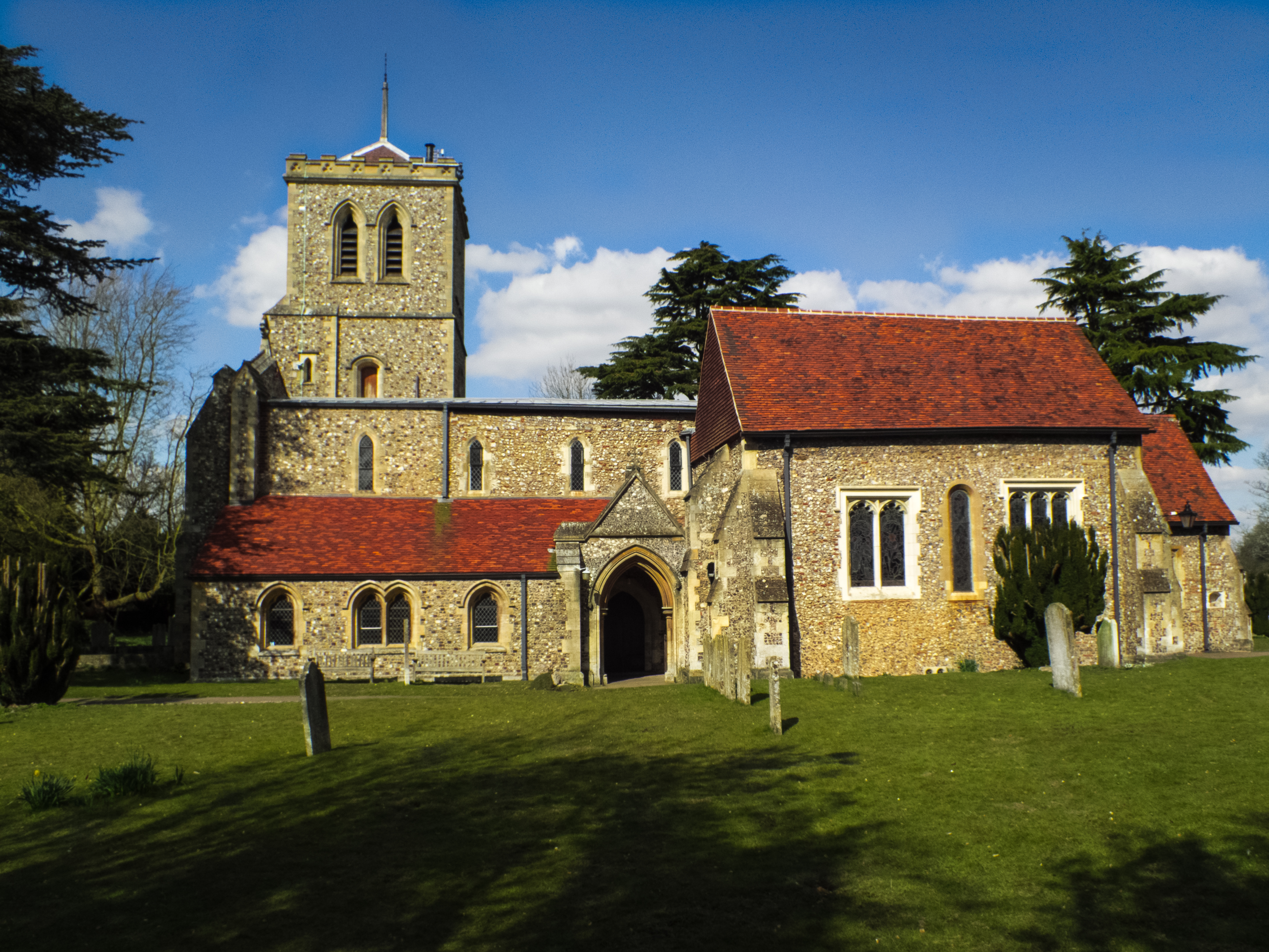
St Michael's Church

St Albans has a cultural life, with regular concerts and theatre productions held at venues including Trestle Arts Base, St Albans Abbey, The Horn, The Pioneer Club, Maltings Arts Theatre, the Alban Arena, the Abbey Theatre, St Peter's Church and St Saviour's Church, given by organisations including St Albans Bach Choir, St Albans Cathedral Choir, St Albans Cathedral Girls' Choir, St Albans Symphony Orchestra, St Albans Chamber Choir, St Albans Chamber Opera, The Company of Ten, St Albans Choral Society, and St Albans Organ Theatre. St Albans is also home to Trestle Theatre Company, who have been creating professional, physical storytelling theatre since 1981. Originally known for their work with masks, Trestle collaborates with UK and international artists to unify movement, music and text into a theatrical experience. The Sandpit Theatre is a theatre attached to Sandringham School which hosts plays throughout the year, mainly performances put on by the pupils of Sandringham School. The school also hosts Best Theatre Arts, a part-time theatre school for children aged 4 to 16. Furthermore, St Albans is home to many music acts such as Enter Shikari, Friendly Fires, Maximum Love, The Zombies, Trash Boat, G.I. Orange, and Your Demise.

The Odyssey Cinema (formerly the Odeon) on London Road is an independent, arthouse cinema that was restored and re-opened in 2014. Originally opened in 1931, it stands on the site of the Alpha Picture House, Hertfordshire's first cinema, which was opened in 1908 by film-making pioneer Arthur Melbourne-Cooper.

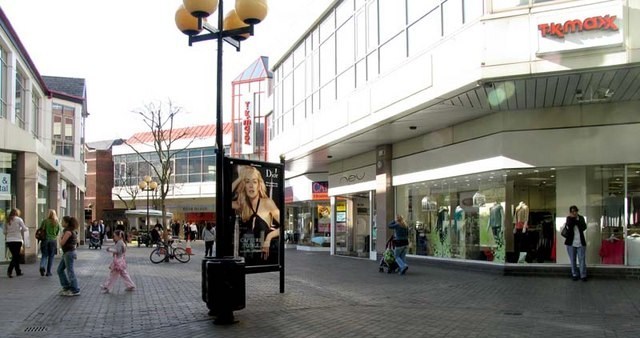
The Maltings Shopping Centre in St Albans

The Watercress nature reserve is by the River Ver and is run by the Watercress Wildlife Association.

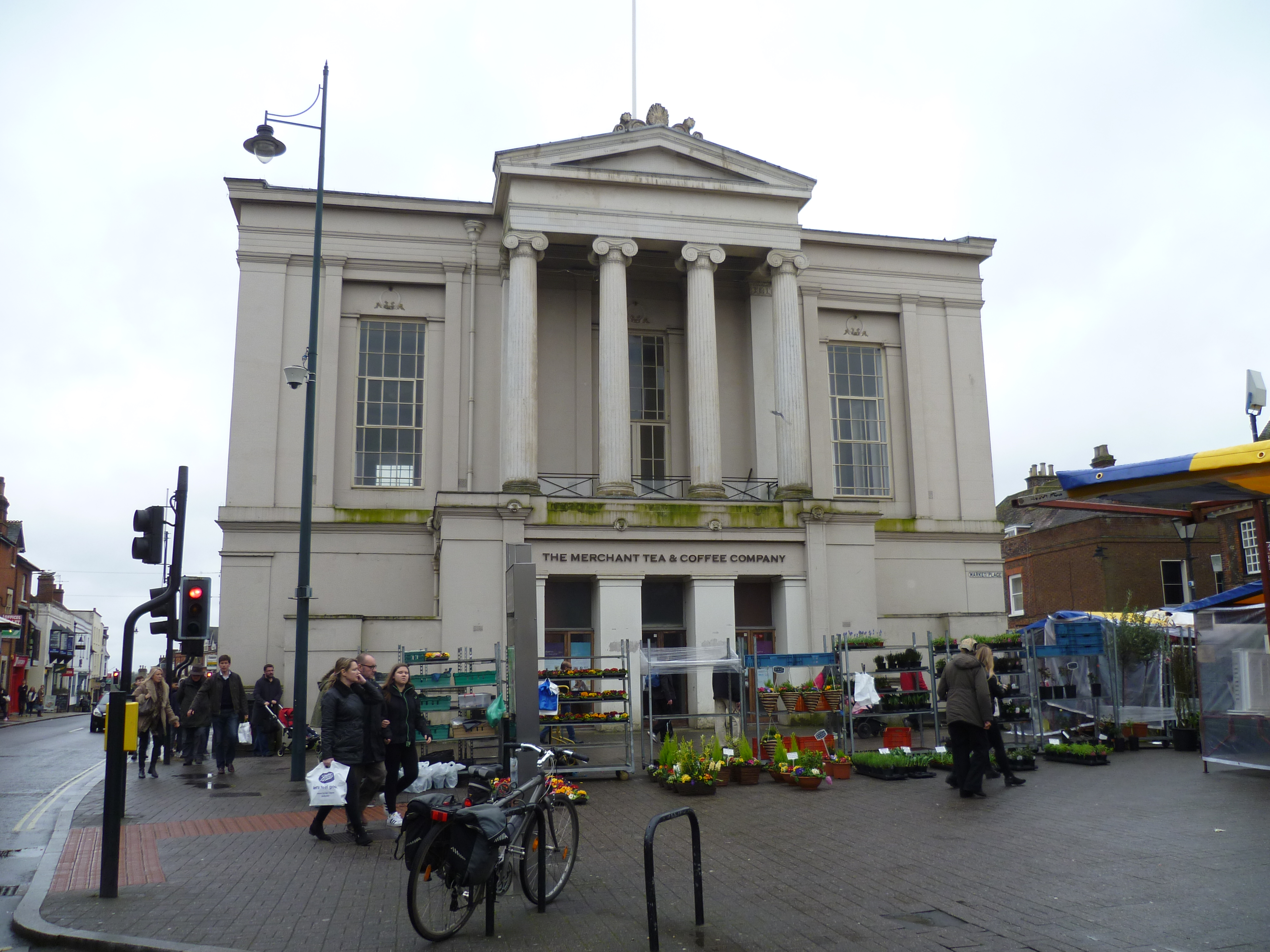
St Albans Town Hall

St Albans Museums runs two museums: Verulamium Museum, which tells the story of everyday life in Roman Britain using objects from the excavations of the important Roman Town; and, the St Albans Museum + Gallery, located in the old St Albans Town Hall, which focuses on the history of the town and of Saint Alban.

Because of its proximity to London, television signals are received from the Crystal Palace TV transmitter, placing St Albans in the BBC London and ITV London areas.

The local radio stations are served by BBC Three Counties Radio on 92.1 FM, Heart Hertfordshire on 96.6 FM and Mix 92.6 on 92.6FM, a community radio station.

The leading local newspaper in the city and district is The Herts Advertiser.

=== Filming location ===
The mixed character of St Albans and its proximity to London have made it a popular filming location. The Abbey and Fishpool Street areas were used for the pilot episode of the 1960s ecclesiastical TV comedy All Gas and Gaiters. The area of Romeland, directly north of the Abbey Gateway and the walls of the Abbey and school grounds, can be seen masquerading as part of an Oxford college in some episodes of Inspector Morse (and several local pubs also appear). Fishpool Street, running from Romeland to St Michael's village, stood in for Hastings in some episodes of Foyle's War. Life Begins was filmed largely in and around St Albans. The Lady Chapel in the Abbey itself was used as a location for at least one scene in Sean Connery's 1995 film First Knight, whilst the nave of the Abbey was used during a coronation scene as a substitute for Westminster Abbey in Johnny English starring Rowan Atkinson. The 19th-century gatehouse of the former prison near the mainline station appeared in the title sequence of the TV series Porridge, starring Ronnie Barker. The 2001 film Birthday Girl starring Ben Chaplin and Nicole Kidman was also partly filmed in St Albans.

More recently, several scenes from the film Incendiary, starring Michelle Williams, Ewan McGregor and Matthew Macfadyen, were filmed in St Albans, focusing in particular on the Abbey and the Abbey Gateway. In 2018, a Gucci advert featuring Harry Styles was filmed at a Fish and Chips shop in Fleetville, St Albans. It has also been used in the setting for the fictional town Waltringham, in the TV show Humans. In early 2022 Verulamium Park was used as a filming location for Wonka starring Timothée Chalamet.

== Sport ==
In December 2007, Sport England published a survey which revealed that residents of St Albans were the 10th most active in England in sports and other fitness activities. 30.8% of the population participate at least 3 times a week for 90 minutes.

=== Cricket ===
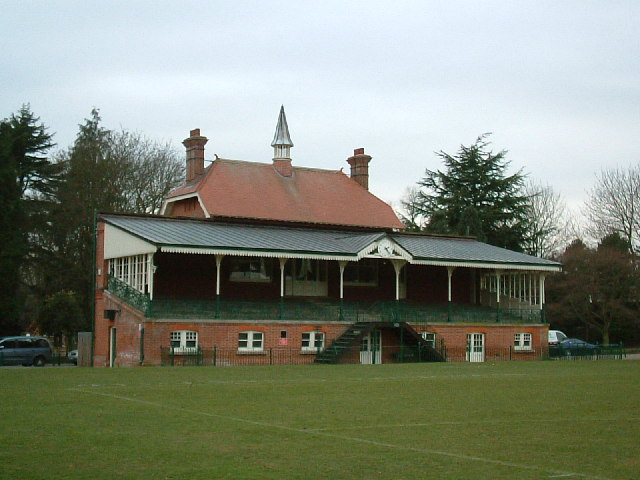
Cricket pavilion at Clarence Park

Clarence Park plays host to St Albans Cricket Club. The club currently runs four Saturday sides, playing in the Saracens Hertfordshire Cricket League and also two Sunday sides in the Chess Valley Cricket League. In 2008 the club's 1st XI won the Hertfordshire League Title. In the previous two seasons, the first XI came 5th (2011) and 4th (2012) in division one.

=== Football ===
The local football team is St Albans City FC: its stadium is on the edge of Clarence Park and the team won promotion from the Conference South League in 2005–06. It played in the Nationwide Conference Division of the Football Conference for the 2006–07 season, but finished at the bottom of the table and was relegated.

=== Gymnastics ===
St Albans Gymnastics Club, founded in 2005, provides the St Albans area with recreational classes as well as a professionally managed competitive squad.

=== Hockey ===
St Albans is also home to St Albans Hockey Club, based in Oaklands, St Albans. The club is represented at National league level by both women's and men's teams, as well as other local league competitions. The club's nickname is The Tangerines.

=== Rugby league ===
St Albans Centurions Rugby league Club have their ground at Toulmin Drive, St Albans. They play in the London Premier League. In 2007 and again in 2010 'The Cents', as they are known, won 'the triple' – topping the league, and becoming the Regional and National Champions of the Rugby League Conference Premier Divisions.

=== Rugby union ===
Old Albanian RFC is a rugby union club that plays at the Old Albanian sports complex. They play in National League 1 the third tier of the English rugby union system. Saracens A team and OA Saints Women's Rugby team also play here. This complex hosts the offices of the Premiership Rugby club Saracens (and have recently moved their home ground to Barnet). St Albans RFC play at Boggymead Spring in Smallford. Verulamians RFC (formerly Old Verulamians) play at Cotlandswick in London Colney.

=== Skateboarding ===
St Albans is home to one of the country's oldest indoor skateparks, the Pioneer Skatepark in Heathlands Drive, next to the former fire station. Its ramps are available to all skateboarders and inliners. A new outside mini ramp was built in March 2005. A second outdoor mini ramp was opened at Easter 2009.

=== Links with other sports ===
St Albans is additionally home to a community of traceurs from around Hertfordshire.

St Albans was once home to the then most prestigious steeplechase in England. The Great St Albans chase attracted the best horses and riders from across Britain and Ireland in the 1830s and was held in such high esteem that when it clashed with the 1837 Grand National the top horses and riders chose to bypass Aintree. Without warning the race was discontinued in 1839 and was quickly forgotten.

St Albans was once home to Samuel Ryder, the founder of the Ryder Cup. He ran a very successful packet seeds business in the 1890s which at one time he ran from a packing warehouse on Holywell Hill (became Café Rouge until closure in 2023). His interest in golf and sponsorship led to his donation of the now famous Ryder Cup. He is buried in Hatfield Road Cemetery, where in July 2012 the Olympic Torch Relay passed by to honour him.

== Education ==
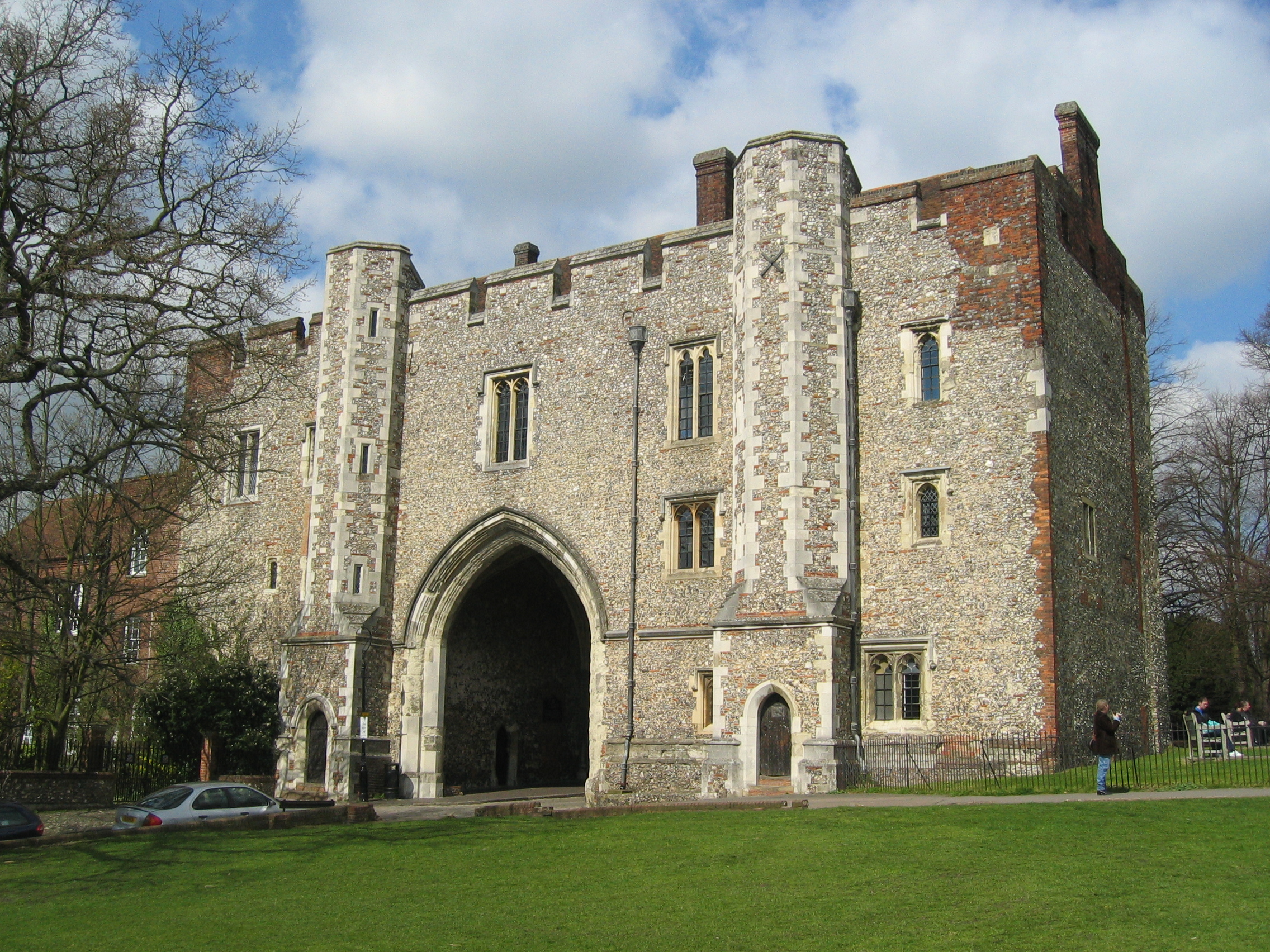
The Abbey Gateway, now part of St Albans School

St Albans has many state primary and secondary schools, and a number of independent schools.

The law school of the University of Hertfordshire used to be based in Hatfield Road in St Albans until it moved to the university's De Havilland campus in Hatfield in 2011. Hertfordshire County Council purchased the site. The interior of the former law school building has since been refurbished and now forms part of Alban City School, a state-funded Free School for primary aged children, which started taking reception class children in September 2012.

A campus of Oaklands College, a further education college, is also located in Smallford in St Albans.

== International relations ==
St Albans is twinned with:

- Odense, Syddanmark, Denmark
- Nevers, Bourgogne-Franche-Comté, France
- Worms, Rhineland-Palatinate, Germany
- Nyíregyháza, Szabolcs-Szatmár-Bereg, Hungary
- Fano, Pesaro and Urbino, Marche, Italy
- Sylhet, Bangladesh

== See also ==
- Kingsbury Watermill Museum
- St Alban and St Stephen's Church, St Albans
- St Albans Museums
- St Albans (UK Parliament constituency)
- Sopwell Priory
- Sopwell House
- Verulam House, St Albans (17th century)
- Verulam House, St Albans
- Verulamium Museum
