= Wulsin (Abbot Ulsinus) =

Abbot of St Alban's Abbey

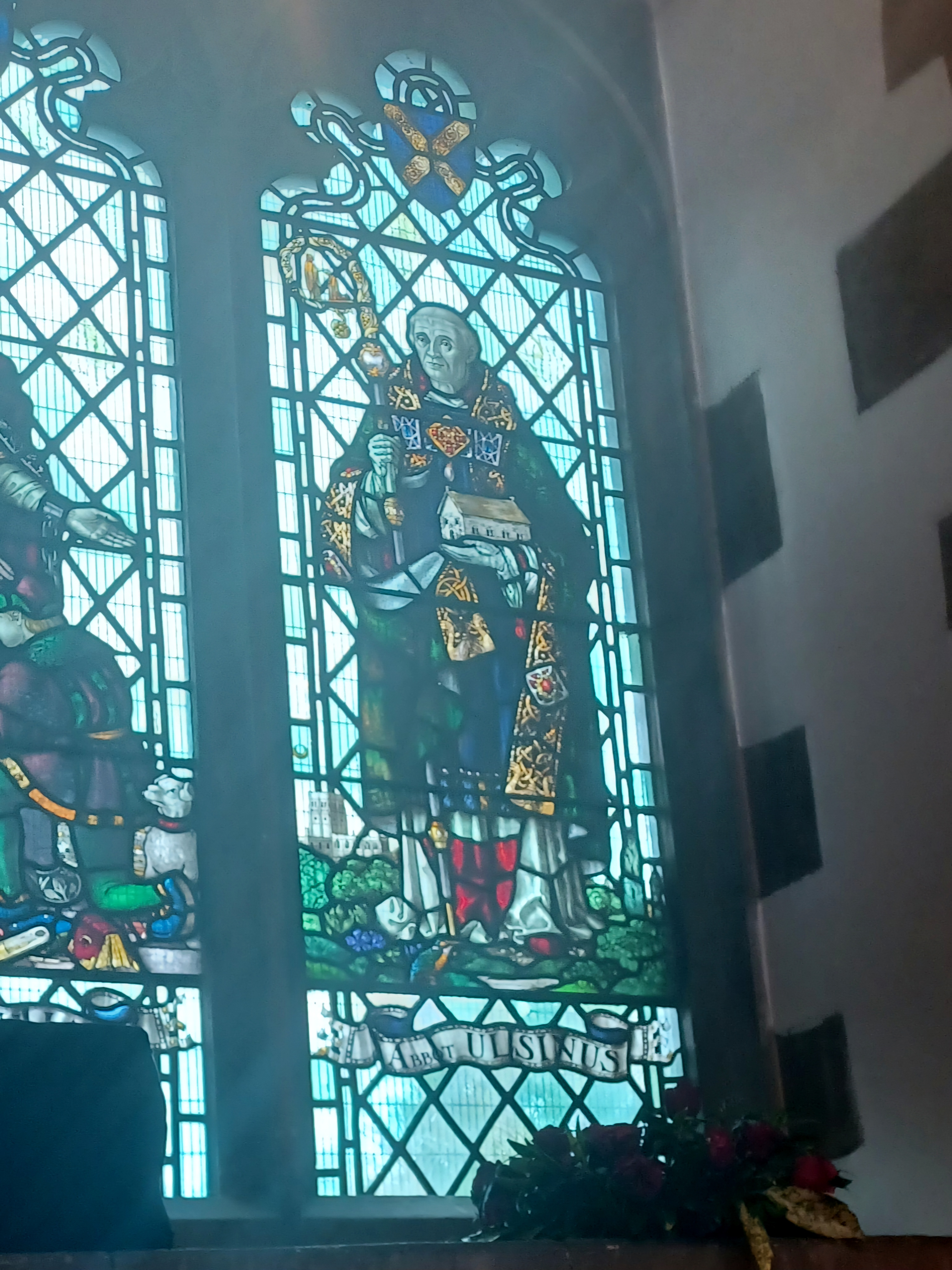
A photo of a stained glass window at St Stephen's church in St Albans, depicting Abbot Ulsinus (Wulsin)

Wulsin (also known as Abbot Ulsinus) was a ninth- or tenth-century abbot of St Alban's Abbey, England. According to the 13th-century chronicler Matthew Paris, in 948 he founded St Albans School, which is still active.

Abbot Wulsin (Ulsinus) also founded the St Albans Market in an attempt to establish a settlement within the confines of the abbey. According to the Abbey Chronicles, the Abbot Wulsin "… loved the area of St. Albans and the people who lived there and sought to improve it. He made it possible for people to come and live there, bringing them together from the surrounding areas, adding to and enlarging the market, and also helped those constructing buildings with the cost of timber …" The date given for this activity is 948 although it is now generally considered that Wulsin's floruit was earlier, around c. 860–880.

Towards the end of the 9th century, Wulsin built churches at the three entrances to the town, on the streets now known as St Peter's Street, St Michael's Street and St Stephen's Hill, to welcome pilgrims on their way to the shrine of St Alban inside the abbey church. St Peter's is located to the northeast of the abbey. St Michael's lies to the west among the foundations of the old basilica (law-court) of Roman Verulamium, where Alban was condemned to die. Bearing in mind that, in sending the first missionaries to Britain, Pope Gregory had instructed them to build churches on important pagan sites, this can hardly be a coincidence. The first churches were likely to have been simple timber structures. The town of St Albans grew around these establishments.

Ulsinus diverted Watling Street, which linked St Stephen's and St Michael's, in order to bring traffic through the town centre (the abbey owned the market rights and also charged tolls). This brought traffic up Holywell Hill, which is named after a medieval holy well, and it was along this route that the supplies for the Abbey were transported.
