= City of St Albans =

Local authority district in England

Coordinates: 51°47′N 00°20′W

City and District of St Albans
- Non-metropolitan district, Borough & City
- St Albans
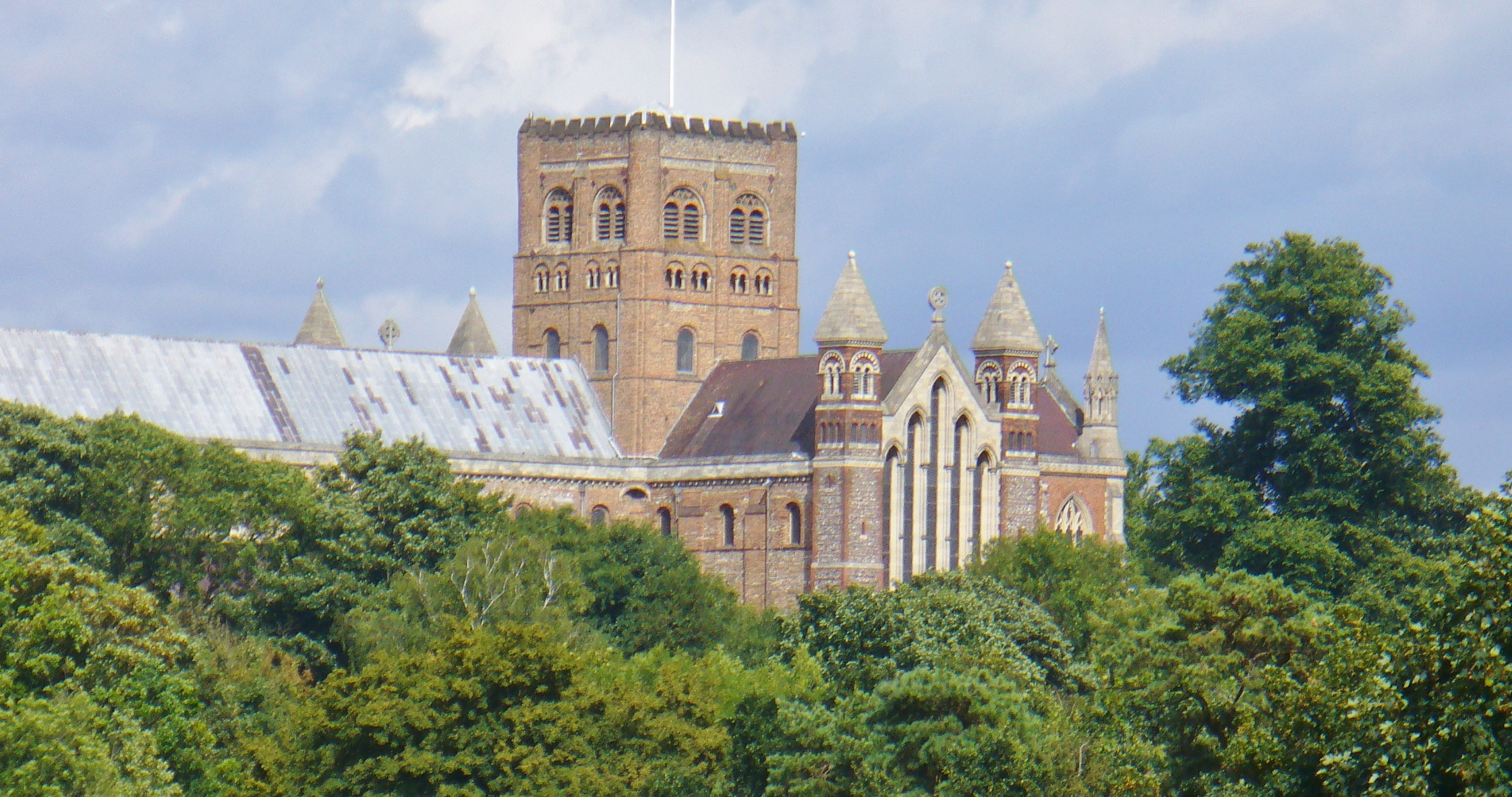
- St Albans Cathedral in St Albans

- Flag

- St Albans shown within Hertfordshire
- Sovereign state: United Kingdom
- Country: England
- Region: East of England
- Non-metropolitan county: Hertfordshire
- Status: Non-metropolitan district, Borough & City
- Admin HQ: St Albans
- Incorporated: 1 April 1974

Government
  - Type: Non-metropolitan district council
  - Body: St Albans City and District Council
  - Leadership: Leader & Committee Structure
  - MPs: Daisy Cooper (LD); Victoria Collins (LD)

Area
  - Total: 62.23 sq mi (161.18 km^{2})
  - Rank: 177 (of 296)

Population (2024)
  - Total: 147,095
  - Rank: 141 (of 296)
  - Density: 2,363.7/sq mi (912.61/km^{2})

Ethnicity (2021)
  - Ethnic groups: List: 83.6% White; 8.2% Asian; 4.3% Mixed; 2.1% Black; 1.8% other

Religion (2021)
  - Religion: List: 47.4% Christianity; 37.1% no religion; 8.5% other; 4.7% Islam; 1.8% Hinduism; 1.5% Judaism
- Time zone: UTC0 (GMT)
  - Summer (DST): UTC+1 (BST)
- ONS code: 26UG (ONS); E07000100 (GSS)
- OS grid reference: TL148073

St Albans (/ˈɔːlbənz/), also known as the City and District of St Albans, is a non-metropolitan district with both borough and city status in Hertfordshire, England. Its council is based in St Albans, the largest settlement in the district. The district also includes the town of Harpenden and several villages. The district borders North Hertfordshire, Welwyn Hatfield, Hertsmere, Watford, Three Rivers, Dacorum, and Central Bedfordshire.

== History ==
The town of St Albans had been an ancient borough since 1553. It was reformed in 1836 to become a municipal borough and additionally gained city status in 1877.

The modern St Albans district was created on 1 April 1974 under the Local Government Act 1972, covering the area of three former districts, which were all abolished at the same time:

- Harpenden Urban District
- St Albans Municipal Borough
- St Albans Rural District (except the part within the designated area of Hemel Hempstead New Town, which went to Dacorum.)

The new district was named St Albans after its largest settlement. It was awarded borough status from its creation, allowing the chair of the council to take the title of mayor, continuing the series of mayors of St Albans which had started in 1553. The city status which had been held by the old municipal borough of St Albans was extended to cover the whole of the new district on 9 July 1974. As such the council could call itself "St Albans City Council", which name is sometimes used for it in official documents, but chooses to style itself "St Albans City and District Council" instead.

Under current local government reorganisation plans, all district councils in Hertfordshire, as well as the county council, will be abolished in 2028, with the district becoming part of a new West Hertfordshire unitary authority.

== Geography ==
The largest settlement is St Albans, followed in size by Harpenden, with the main villages being Redbourn, Wheathampstead, London Colney, Chiswell Green and Bricket Wood.

Nearby towns include Hatfield and Welwyn Garden City to the east, Luton and Dunstable to the north, Hemel Hempstead to the west, Watford to the southwest and Borehamwood to the south. The district lies close to Greater London, at the closest point being less than 4 miles (6.4 km) from its outer boundary. From the centre of St Albans to the centre of London is about 19 miles (31 km).

== Governance ==
St Albans City and District Council

Type
- Type: Non-metropolitan district council

Leadership
- Mayor: Matt Fisher, Green since 27 May 2026
- Leader: Paul De Kort, Liberal Democrats since 22 May 2024
- Chief Executive: Amanda Foley since 17 July 2017

Structure
- Seats: 56
- Political groups: Administration (43) Liberal Democrats (43) Other parties (13) Conservative (5) Green (3) Labour (2) Independent (3)

Elections
- Last election: 7 May 2026

Meeting place
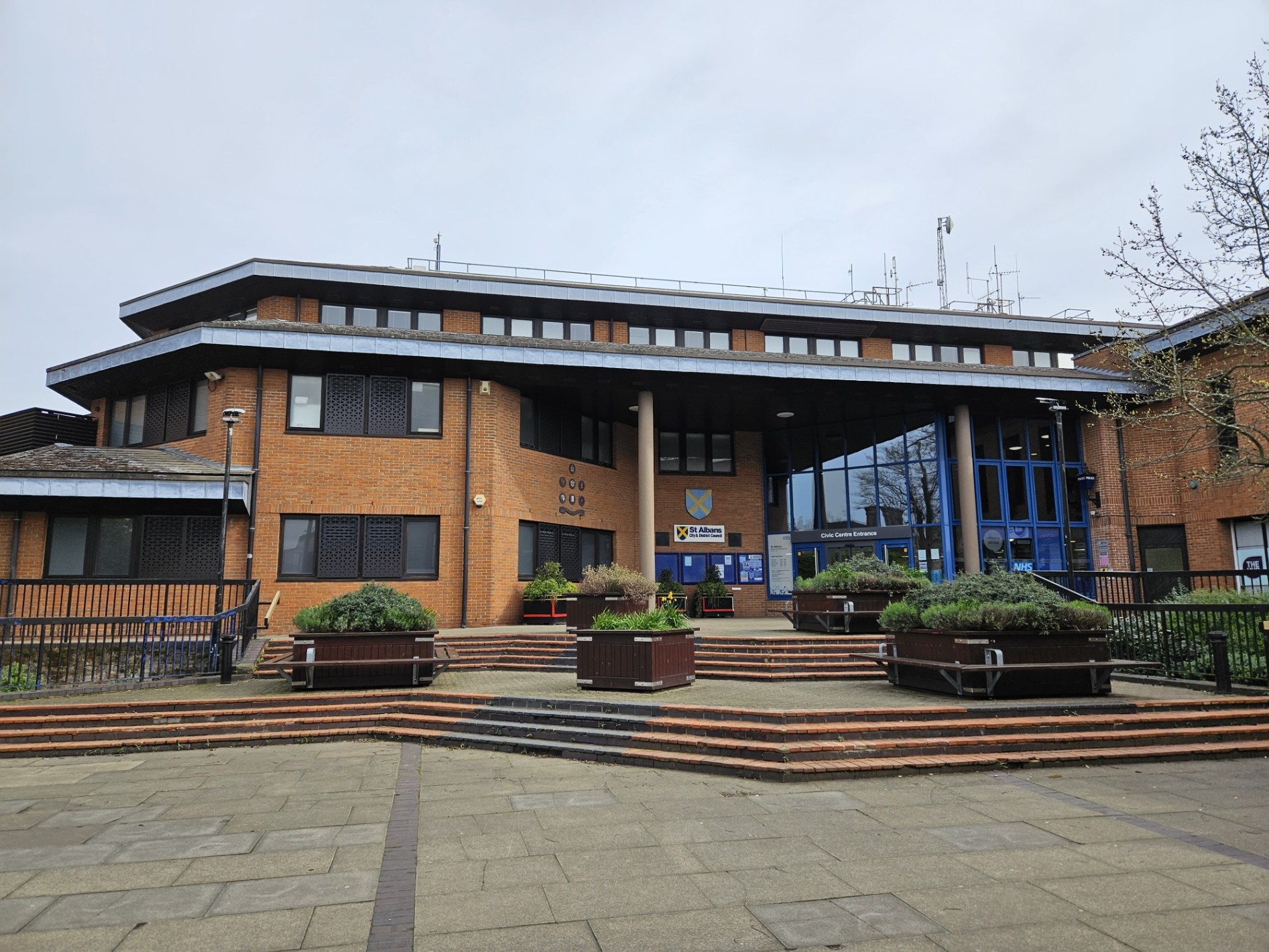
- Civic Centre, St Peter's Street, St Albans, AL1 3JE

Website
- www.stalbans.gov.uk

Hertfordshire has a two-tier structure of local government, with the ten district councils (including St Albans City and District Council) providing district-level services, and Hertfordshire County Council providing county-level services. In some areas there is an additional third tier of civil parishes.

Hertfordshire County Council is responsible for services including education, transport, fire and public safety, social care and libraries. The district council's responsibilities include electoral services, food safety, licensing, car parks, allotments, cemeteries, grounds maintenance, leisure and theatre facilities (in Council's ownership) museums, parks and open spaces, markets, street cleaning, management and maintenance of council owned housing, the administration of housing benefits, town planning, and building control. Parish council responsibilities include allotments, youth projects, leisure facilities, open spaces, traffic calming and community transport schemes.

=== Political control ===
The council has been under Liberal Democrat majority control since 2021. The first elections to the district council were held in 1973, initially acting as a shadow authority alongside the outgoing authorities until the new arrangements took effect on 1 April 1974. Political control since 1974 has been as follows:

Party in control	Years
Conservative	1974–1984
No overall control	1984–1988
Conservative	1988–1991
No overall control	1991–1994
Liberal Democrats	1994–1999
No overall control	1999–2006
Liberal Democrats	2006–2007
No overall control	2007–2008
Liberal Democrats	2008–2011
No overall control	2011–2015
Conservative	2015–2019
No overall control	2019–2021
Liberal Democrats	2021–present

=== Leadership ===
The role of mayor of St Albans is largely ceremonial. They preside at council meetings and act as first citizen of the district. They are chosen from among the councillors but are expected to maintain a non-political stance, although they do have the right to exercise a casting vote in the case of a tied vote at a meeting. The role of mayor is usually held by a different councillor each year, continuing the series of mayors of St Albans which dates back to the first borough charter of 1553.

Political leadership is provided by the leader of the council. The leaders since 2003 have been:

Councillor	Party	From	To
Robert Donald	Liberal Democrats	18 Dec 2003	May 2011
Julian Daly	Conservative	18 May 2011	24 May 2017
Alec Campbell	Conservative	24 May 2017	May 2019
Chris White	Liberal Democrats	22 May 2019	May 2024
Paul De Kort	Liberal Democrats	22 May 2024	

=== Composition ===
Following the 2026 election and subequent changes to July 2026, the composition of the council was:

Party	Seats
Liberal Democrats	43
Conservative	5
Green	3
Labour	2
Independent	3
Total	56

The next elections are scheduled for 2027, but may be affected by the upcoming structural changes to local government in England.

=== Premises ===
The council is based at the Civic Centre on St Peter's Street in the centre of St Albans. The building was purpose-built for the council in 1989 and incorporates an emergency bunker in the basement, now used as committee rooms.

== Elections ==
Since the last boundary changes in 2022 the council has comprised 56 councillors, with the district being divided into 20 wards, each electing one, two or three councillors. Elections are held three years out of every four, electing roughly a third of the council each time. Elections to Hertfordshire County Council are held in the fourth year of the cycle when there are no district council elections.

=== Wards ===
The district's wards are:

- Batchwood
- Bernards Heath
- Clarence
- Colney Heath
- Cunningham
- Harpenden East
- Harpenden North and Rural
- Harpenden South
- Harpenden West
- Hill End
- London Colney
- Marshalswick East and Jersey Farm
- Marshalswick West
- Park Street
- Redbourn
- Sandridge and Wheathampstead
- Sopwell
- St Peters
- St Stephen
- Verulam

== Parishes ==
There are parish councils in Colney Heath, Harpenden, Harpenden Rural, London Colney, Redbourn, St Michael, St Stephen (including the villages of Chiswell Green and Bricket Wood), Sandridge and Wheathampstead. Harpenden's parish council takes the style "town council". The area of the pre-1974 borough of St Albans is an unparished area, where local affairs are discussed by a City Neighbourhoods Committee comprising the district councillors for that area.

Parish	Council	Population (2011)	Area (2011)
Colney Heath	Colney Heath Parish Council	5,962	1,119 hectares (4.32 sq mi)
Harpenden	Harpenden Town Council	29,448	1,278 hectares (4.93 sq mi)
Harpenden Rural	Harpenden Rural Parish Council	405	923 hectares (3.56 sq mi)
London Colney	London Colney Parish Council	9,507	513 hectares (1.98 sq mi)
Redbourn	Redbourn Parish Council	5,344	1,908 hectares (7.37 sq mi)
Sandridge	Sandridge Parish Council	11,451	1,518 hectares (5.86 sq mi)
St Michael	St Michael Parish Council	477	2,120 hectares (8.2 sq mi)
St Stephen	St Stephen Parish Council	13,865	2,329 hectares (8.99 sq mi)
Wheathampstead	Wheathampstead Parish Council	6,410	2,599 hectares (10.03 sq mi)
Total parishes		82,869	14,307 hectares (55.24 sq mi)
St Albans (unparished)	City Neighbourhood Committee	57,795	1,811 hectares (6.99 sq mi)
St Albans City and District	St Albans City and District Council	140,664	16,118 hectares (62.23 sq mi)

== Economy ==
St Albans has a highly skilled workforce, with the 4th highest proportion of managers, senior officials and professional occupations in the country. Nearly half of working age residents have a degree or equivalent qualification. Average weekly earnings are £724.40, 44% higher than the national average. The St Albans District has lower than average unemployment and the lowest in Hertfordshire. 2.8% of residents are disabled or permanently sick, compared with 5–6% nationally.

Deloitte, Spreadex, AECOM, PricewaterhouseCoopers and Premier Foods have offices in the district. Sainsbury's Retail Distribution Centre at London Colney employs over 600 staff.

In 2024 St Albans Market was awarded the title Best Large Outdoor Market by the National Association of British Market Authorities.

== Transport ==
The M1 motorway, the M25 motorway, the A414 road and A1081 road run through the district. The district has six railway stations. Two (St Albans City and Harpenden) are on the main Thameslink route from Bedford to Brighton via London. The other four are on the Abbey Line branch line from St Albans Abbey to Watford Junction.

== Demography ==
In 2001 St Albans City and District had a population of 129,005 (50.8% female, 49.2% male). The mid 2012 population estimate was 138,800. By the time 2021 Census the population had risen to 148,167, with 75,167 females and 72,296 males. In 2001 there were 20.5% children, 64.5% people of working age (16–64) and 14.9% older people (65+). 86.9% of St Albans residents are White British, 4.3% Other White, 2% Irish and 1.3% Bangladeshi. 71% identify as Christian, 24.1% as "no religion" or "religion not stated", 2.6% as Muslim and 0.9% as Jewish.

== Twin towns ==
St Albans is twinned with:

- Fano, Italy
- Nyíregyháza, Hungary
- Nevers, France
- Odense, Denmark
- Worms, Germany
- Nieuwleusen, Netherlands
- Sylhet, Bangladesh

In addition, there are friendship links with:

- HMS St Albans (F83)

== Arms ==
Coat of arms of City of St Albans
Crest Issuant from a mural crown Or a demi figure of a knight armed of the period circa 1215 holding in the dexter hand a sword erect and in the sinister hand a roll of parchment Proper. Escutcheon Azure a saltire Or. Supporters On the dexter side an abbot in Liturgical vestments and plain mitre and supporting with the exterior hand a crozier on the sinister side a figure representing John the Printer and holding in the exterior hand an ink-ball. Compartment Per pale of a ploughed field and cobbles all Proper.

== See also ==
- St Albans Museums
