= St Albans City and District Council elections =

Local government elections in Hertfordshire, England

St Albans City and District Council elections are held three years out of every four to elect members of St Albans City and District Council in Hertfordshire, England. Since the last boundary changes in 2022 the council has comprised 56 councillors, with the district being divided into 20 wards. Elections to Hertfordshire County Council are held in the fourth year of the cycle when there are no district council elections.

== Council elections ==
Summary of the council composition after each council elections, click on the year for full details of each election. Boundary changes took place for the 1999 election increasing the number of seats by 1.

Year	Conservative	Liberal Democrats (Note: Includes totals for the predecessors of the Liberal Democrats, the Liberal Party and SDP (both of which participated in the Alliance).)	Labour	Green	Independents & Others	Council control after election
Local government reorganisation; council established (54 seats)
1973	32	7	14	–	1	Conservative
1976	45	1	6	0	2	Conservative
New ward boundaries (57 seats)
1979	43	2	8	0	4	Conservative
1980	37	5	11	0	4	Conservative
1982	29	15	10	0	3	Conservative
1983	30	17	9	0	1	Conservative
1984	25	23	7	0	2	No overall control
1986	23	25	8	0	1	No overall control
1987	24	25	7	0	1	No overall control
1988	32	17	8	0	0	Conservative
1990	31	17	8	0	1	Conservative
1991	27	20	9	0	0	No overall control
1992	23	23	10	0	1	No overall control
1994	19	29	9	0	0	Liberal Democrats
1995	13	34	10	0	0	Liberal Democrats
1996	5	39	11	0	1	Liberal Democrats
1998	11	30	16	0	0	Liberal Democrats
New ward boundaries (58 seats)
1999	21	21	16	0	0	No overall control
2000	19	23	15	0	1	No overall control
2002	20	21	15	0	2 (Note: Including 1 vacant seat)	No overall control
2003	21	23	13	0	1	No overall control
2004	17	29	11	0	1	Liberal Democrats
2006	17	31	8	0	2	Liberal Democrats
New ward boundaries (58 seats)
2007	19	29	8	0	2	Liberal Democrats
2008	22	30	5	0	1	Liberal Democrats
2010	24	30	3	0	1	Liberal Democrats
2011	29	24	3	1	1	Conservative
2012	29	19	8	1	1	Conservative
2014	29	17	10	1	1	Conservative
2015	32	16	8	1	1	Conservative
2016	31	17	7	1	2	Conservative
2018	30	18	7	1	2	Conservative
2019	23	25	6	1	3	No overall control
2021	23	30	2	1	2	Liberal Democrats
New ward boundaries (56 seats)
2022	4	50	0	1	1	Liberal Democrats
2023	4	48	0	2	2 (Note: Including 1 vacant seat)	Liberal Democrats
2024	3	45	2	3	2 (Note: Including 1 vacant seat)	Liberal Democrats
2026	5	44	2	3	2	Liberal Democrats

- Notes:

== District result maps ==
1999 results map

2000 results map

2002 results map

2003 results map

2004 results map

2006 results map

2007 results map

2008 results map

2010 results map

2011 results map

2012 results map

2014 results map

2015 results map

2016 results map

2018 results map

2019 results map

2021 results map

2022 results map

2023 results map

2024 results map

2026 results map

== By-election results ==
By-elections occur when seats become vacant between council elections. Below is a summary of recent by-elections; full by-election results can be found by clicking on the by-election name.

By-election	Date	Incumbent party	Winning party
Sopwell	13 June 1996	Labour	Labour
Marshalswick North	27 February 1997	Liberal Democrats	Liberal Democrats
Sopwell	23 July 1998	Labour	Labour
Verulam	2 December 1999	Conservative	Conservative
Park Street	12 October 2000	Liberal Democrats	Liberal Democrats
Sopwell	7 June 2001	Labour	Labour
Verulam	27 June 2002	Conservative	Liberal Democrats
Verulam	5 April 2004	Conservative	Liberal Democrats
Harpenden South	4 June 2009	Conservative	Conservative
Ashley	3 June 2010	Liberal Democrats	Liberal Democrats
Batchwood	19 January 2012	Liberal Democrats	Labour
Marshalswick South	29 January 2015	Conservative	Conservative
Clarence	20 October 2016	Liberal Democrats	Liberal Democrats
Clarence	3 October 2019	Liberal Democrats	Liberal Democrats
St Peters	13 June 2023	Liberal Democrats	Green
Marshalswick East and Jersey Farm	17 August 2023	Liberal Democrats	Liberal Democrats
Sandridge and Wheathampstead	7 December 2023	Liberal Democrats	Liberal Democrats
Harpenden North and Rural	17 October 2024	Liberal Democrats	Conservative
Redbourn	1 May 2025	Liberal Democrats	Liberal Democrats
