= 2027 St Albans City and District Council election =

2027 English local government election

- 6 May 2027

18 out of 56 seats to St Albans City and District Council 29 seats needed for a majority
Leader	Paul de Kort	Matt Cowley	Simon Grover (Note: Leader of the Green & Independent group.)
Party	Liberal Democrats	Conservative	Green
Leader's seat	Harpenden East	Harpenden South	St Peter's
Last election	45 seats, 45.2%	5 seats, 18.4%	3 seats, 13.1%
Current seats	43	5	3
Leader	Simon Grover	Emma Turnbull
Party	Independent	Labour
Leader's seat	St Peter's	London Colney
Last election	1 seat, 2.4%	2 seats, 4.9%
Current seats	3	2
Incumbent Leader
Paul de Kort
Liberal Democrats

The 2027 St Albans City and District Council election will be held on 6 May 2027 to elect members of St Albans City and District Council in Hertfordshire, England. This will be on the same day as other local elections held across the United Kingdom.

== Background ==
=== Local government reorganisation ===
Due to proposed structural changes to local government in England, the 2026 election was intended to be the final election to the council before it was abolished and replaced by West Hertfordshire Council, a new unitary authority. However, on 7 September 2026, the government announced it was withdrawing plans for the planned restructuring pending review. Following this announcement, local elections due to be held in 2027 under the existing local electoral calendar would proceed.

== Summary ==
=== Election result ===
2027 St Albans City and District Council election
Party	This election				Full council			This election		
Party	Candidates	Seats	Net	Seats %	Other	Total	Total %	Votes	Votes %	+/−
Liberal Democrats					30					
Conservative					4					
Green					1					
Independent					2					
Labour					1					

=== Incumbents ===
Ward	Incumbent councillor	Affiliation	Re-standing
Batchwood	Jenni Murray	Liberal Democrats	
Bernards Heath	Chris Brattle	Liberal Democrats	
Clarence	Matt Fisher	Green	
Cunningham	Keith Cotton	Liberal Democrats	
Harpenden East	Dason Canning	Independent	
Harpenden North & Rural	Ayesha Rohale	Liberal Democrats	
Harpenden South	Teresa Heritage	Conservative	
Harpenden West	Fiona Gaskell	Liberal Democrats	
Hill End	Graeme Shaw	Liberal Democrats	
London Colney	Emma Turnbull	Labour	
Marshalswick East & Jersey Farm	Raj Visram	Liberal Democrats	
Park Street	Nuala Webb	Liberal Democrats	
Redbourn	Brian Gunson	Liberal Democrats	
Sandridge & Wheathampstead	Simon Johns	Liberal Democrats	
Sopwell	Harriet Sherlock	Liberal Democrats	
St Peters	Simon Grover	Green	
St Stephen	Mohammed Rafi	Liberal Democrats	
Verulam	Julian Degg	Liberal Democrats	
