= 2026 St Albans City and District Council election =

Local election in Hertfordshire, England

2026 St Albans City & District Council election
- 7 May 2026

22 out of 56 seats to St Albans City & District Council (including 2 by-elections) 29 seats needed for a majority
- Registered: 112,881
- Turnout: 45.7%
	First party	Second party	Third party
Leader	Paul De Kort	Matt Cowley	Simon Grover
Party	Liberal Democrats	Conservative	Green
Leader's seat	Harpenden East	Harpenden South	St Peters
Last election	47 seats, 49.7%	3 seats, 21.3%	3 seats, 14.6%
Seats before	46	4	3
Seats after	45	5	3
Seat change	▼1	▲1	Steady
Popular vote	25,811	10,501	7,469
Percentage	45.2%	18.4%	13.1%
	Fourth party	Fifth party
Leader	Emma Turnbull	N/A
Party	Labour	Independent
Leader's seat	London Colney	N/A
Last election	2 seats, 12.0%	1 seat, 0.6%
Seats before	2	1
Seats after	2	1
Seat change	Steady	Steady
Popular vote	2,793	1,374
Percentage	4.9%	2.4%
- Winner of each seat at the 2026 St Albans City and District Council election.
Leader before election
Paul De Kort
Liberal Democrats
Leader after election
Paul De Kort
Liberal Democrats

The 2026 St Albans City and District Council election was held on 7 May 2026, alongside the other local elections across the United Kingdom being held on the same day, to elect 20 of 56 members of St Albans City and District Council in Hertfordshire, England. The Liberal Democrats retained their majority on the council.

Due to ongoing local government reorganisation, this will be the final election to St Albans City and District Council before it is abolished and replaced by a successor unitary authority. Elections to the successor authority are due to take place in 2027.

== Summary ==
=== Background ===
In 2024, the Liberal Democrats retained control of the council.

=== Council composition ===
After 2024 election		Before 2026 election	
Party	Seats	Party	Seats
Liberal Democrats	47	Liberal Democrats	46
Conservative	3	Conservative	4
Green	3	Green	3
Labour	2	Labour	2
Independent	1	Independent	1

Changes 2024–2026:

- September 2024: Beth Fisher (Liberal Democrats) resigns – by-election held October 2024
- October 2024: Sue Griffiths (Conservative) gains by-election from Liberal Democrats
- March 2025: Andy Thurston (Liberal Democrats) resigns – by-election held May 2025
- May 2025: Brian Gunson (Liberal Democrats) wins by-election

=== Election result ===
2026 St Albans City & District Council election
Party	This election				Full council			This election		
Party	Candidates	Seats	Net	Seats %	Other	Total	Total %	Votes	Votes %	+/−
Liberal Democrats	{{{candidates}}}	19	▼1	86.3	28	47	84.6	25,811	45.2	-4.5
Conservative	{{{candidates}}}	2	▲1	9.1	3	5	9.0	10,501	18.4	-2.6
Green	{{{candidates}}}	0	Steady	0.0	3	3	5.4	7,469	13.1	-1.5
Labour	{{{candidates}}}	0	Steady	0.0	2	2	3.6	2,793	4.9	-7.1
Independent	{{{candidates}}}	1	Steady	4.6	0	1	1.8	1,374	2.4	+1.8
Reform	{{{candidates}}}	0	Steady	0.0	0	0	0.0	9,195	16.0	+14.3
Communist	{{{candidates}}}	0	Steady	0.0	0	0	0.0	15	0.1	±0.0

== Incumbents ==
Ward	Incumbent councillor	Party	Re-standing
Batchwood	Sinéad Howland	Liberal Democrats	No
Bernards Heath	Helen Campbell	Liberal Democrats	Yes
Clarence	Josie Madoc	Liberal Democrats	Yes
Colney Heath	Chris Brazier	Liberal Democrats	Yes
Cunningham	Robert Donald	Liberal Democrats	Yes
Harpenden East	Pip Liver	Liberal Democrats	Yes
Harpenden North & Rural	Ed Moore	Liberal Democrats	No
Harpenden South	David Heritage	Conservative	Yes
Harpenden West	Gill Haynes	Liberal Democrats	No
Hill End	Jamie Day	Liberal Democrats	Yes
London Colney	Tony Lillico	Liberal Democrats	Yes
Marshalswick East & Jersey Farm	Lorraine Kirby	Liberal Democrats	Yes
Marshalswick West	Michael Jones	Liberal Democrats	Yes
Park Street	Syed Abidi	Liberal Democrats	No
Redbourn	David Mitchell	Independent	Yes
Sandridge & Wheathampstead	Simon Johns (Note: Elected at the 2023 Sandridge & Wheathampstead by-election.)	Liberal Democrats	Yes
Sopwell	Sarwar Shamsher	Liberal Democrats	Yes
St Peters	Jacqui Taylor	Liberal Democrats	No
St Stephen	Ajanta Hilton	Liberal Democrats	Yes
Verulam	Dawn Gamble	Liberal Democrats	Yes

== Ward results ==
=== Batchwood ===
Batchwood
Party	Candidate	Votes	%	±%
Liberal Democrats	Chris Lewis	1,091	41.7	−0.1
Independent	Damian Glaskin	603	23.1	−16.9
Green	Tatiana Metcalf-Riener	344	13.2	−26.8
Reform	Kathleen Robinson	234	8.9	N/A
Conservative	Stella Nash	181	6.9	−4.1
Labour	Chris Cloke	152	5.8	−5.2
Majority		488	18.6	
Turnout		2,615	45.2	+4.1
Registered electors		5,791		
Liberal Democrats hold		Swing		

=== Bernards Heath ===
Bernards Heath
Party	Candidate	Votes	%	±%
Liberal Democrats	Helen Campbell*	1,447	54.0	−1.8
Green	Claire Gilbert	514	19.2	+7.3
Conservative	Ambrose Killen	332	12.4	−1.1
Reform	William Smith	254	9.5	N/A
Labour	Jane Cloke	127	4.7	−5.4
Majority		933	34.8	−7.5
Turnout		2,681	45.1	+2.8
Registered electors		5,945		
Liberal Democrats hold		Swing		

=== Clarence ===
Clarence
Party	Candidate	Votes	%	±%
Liberal Democrats	Josie Madoc*	1,557	47.1	+0.5
Green	Livvy Gibbs	1,269	38.4	−3.6
Reform	Stephen Bird	224	6.8	N/A
Conservative	June Reid	125	3.8	−1.9
Labour	Martin McGrath	123	3.7	−2.0
Majority		288	8.7	+4.1
Turnout		3,305	53.0	+5.7
Registered electors		6,237		
Liberal Democrats hold		Swing		

=== Colney Heath ===
Colney Heath
Party	Candidate	Votes	%	±%
Liberal Democrats	Chris Brazier*	413	42.4	−16.7
Conservative	Frances Leonard	225	23.1	−4.3
Reform	Mark Woolhouse	223	22.9	N/A
Green	Rebecca Watters	80	8.2	−0.4
Labour	Iain Grant	30	3.1	−1.8
Majority		188	19.3	−12.4
Turnout		973	44.3	+7.0
Registered electors		2,198		
Liberal Democrats hold		Swing		

=== Cunningham ===
Cunningham
Party	Candidate	Votes	%	±%
Liberal Democrats	Robert Donald*	1,262	53.9	−2.8
Reform	James Humphrey	351	15.0	N/A
Green	Isabelle Habib	328	14.0	+3.5
Conservative	Rachael Drewitt	251	10.7	−2.8
Labour	John Paton	142	6.1	−7.3
Majority		911	38.9	−4.3
Turnout		2,341	40.5	+3.4
Registered electors		5,780		
Liberal Democrats hold		Swing		

=== Harpenden East ===
Harpenden East
Party	Candidate	Votes	%	±%
Liberal Democrats	Pip Liver*	1,107	44.7	−9.7
Conservative	Geoffrey Newman	675	27.2	+0.1
Reform	Thomas Cooney	327	13.2	N/A
Green	Lesley Baker	248	10.0	+1.4
Labour	Neil Mulcock	110	4.4	−5.5
Majority		432	17.5	−9.8
Turnout		2,478	43.0	+8.1
Registered electors		5,782		
Liberal Democrats hold		Swing		

=== Harpenden North and Rural ===
Harpenden North and Rural
Party	Candidate	Votes	%	±%
Liberal Democrats	Kevin Timmons	1,088	40.6	−13.1
Conservative	Sam Spiri	812	30.3	−0.3
Reform	Philip Wells	428	16.0	N/A
Green	Joel Crichton	250	9.3	+2.3
Labour	Ben Dearman	96	3.6	−5.1
Majority		276	10.3	−12.8
Turnout		2,678	44.3	+7.7
Registered electors		6,048		
Liberal Democrats hold		Swing		

=== Harpenden South ===
Harpenden South
Party	Candidate	Votes	%	±%
Conservative	David Heritage*	1,185	42.6	−3.6
Liberal Democrats	Nikolaus Rath	898	32.3	−11.4
Reform	Matthew Swan	388	13.9	N/A
Green	Tanja Brueckmann-Rath	195	7.0	+3.0
Labour	Guy Thomas	109	3.9	−2.2
Majority		287	10.3	+7.8
Turnout		2,783	49.4	+6.5
Registered electors		5,633		
Conservative hold		Swing		

=== Harpenden West ===
Harpenden West
Party	Candidate	Votes	%	±%
Conservative	Aaron Jacob	1,290	40.3	+2.3
Liberal Democrats	Ric Belfield	1,270	39.7	−9.4
Reform	Paul Brayley	305	9.5	N/A
Green	Mario May	220	6.9	+2.1
Labour	David Crew	108	3.8	−4.3
Majority		20	0.6	−10.5
Turnout		3,198	50.9	+6.4
Registered electors		6,279		
Conservative gain from Liberal Democrats		Swing		

=== Hill End ===
Hill End
Party	Candidate	Votes	%	±%
Liberal Democrats	Jamie Day*	1,615	62.4	−8.1
Green	Marianne Jordan	343	13.3	+3.4
Reform	Caspar Thomas	293	11.3	N/A
Conservative	Sudha Bharadia	234	9.0	−2.4
Labour	Steve Clarke	97	3.7	−4.5
Majority		1,272	49.1	−10.0
Turnout		2,587	45.8	+5.6
Registered electors		5,655		
Liberal Democrats hold		Swing		

=== London Colney ===
London Colney
Party	Candidate	Votes	%	±%
Liberal Democrats	Tony Lillico*	872	34.8	+7.6
Reform	Eleanor Jackson	632	25.2	+16.0
Labour	David Eaton	563	22.5	−24.2
Conservative	Sarah Lister	226	9.0	−16.9
Green	Aimee Crompton-Smith	203	8.1	−0.8
Majority		240	9.6	
Turnout		2,503	42.0	+8.8
Registered electors		5,955		
Liberal Democrats hold		Swing		

=== Marshalswick East and Jersey Farm ===
Marshalswick East and Jersey Farm
Party	Candidate	Votes	%	±%
Liberal Democrats	Lorraine Kirby*	1,389	49.0	+2.3
Conservative	Graham Leonard	610	21.5	−15.8
Reform	Larraine Charters	418	14.8	N/A
Green	Joe Flynn	319	11.3	+3.1
Labour	Stephen Poxon	87	3.1	−4.7
Majority		779	27.5	+18.1
Turnout		2,833	46.9	+6.5
Registered electors		6,038		
Liberal Democrats hold		Swing		

=== Marshalswick West ===
Marshalswick West
Party	Candidate	Votes	%	±%
Liberal Democrats	Michael Jones*	1,121	57.5	−5.5
Conservative	Don Deepthi	282	14.5	−6.3
Reform	Thomas Russell	248	12.7	N/A
Green	Jason Flynn	215	11.1	+1.5
Labour	Sarah Heiser	82	4.2	−2.4
Majority		839	43.0	+0.8
Turnout		1,951	49.5	+6.7
Registered electors		3,938		
Liberal Democrats hold		Swing		

=== Park Street ===
Park Street
Party	Candidate	Votes	%	±%
Liberal Democrats	Rav Dighe	1,185	42.1	−8.6
Reform	Roger Gray	760	27.0	N/A
Conservative	Richard Curthoys	513	18.2	−6.0
Green	Mark Park-Crowne	261	9.3	+1.9
Labour	Laurence Chester	91	3.2	−5.1
Majority		425	15.1	−11.4
Turnout		2,814	42.5	+9.5
Registered electors		6,626		
Liberal Democrats hold		Swing		

=== Redbourn ===
Redbourn
Party	Candidate	Votes	%	±%
Independent	David Mitchell*	771	39.6	N/A
Reform	Joy Swan	399	20.5	N/A
Liberal Democrats	Naina Bloom	316	16.2	−33.6
Conservative	Amanda Nash	268	13.8	−21.8
Green	Matthew Thomas	124	6.4	+0.8
Labour	Andy Hayes	64	3.3	−5.7
Majority		372	19.1	+10.2
Turnout		1,947	45.0	+7.1
Registered electors		4,325		
Independent hold		Swing		

=== Sandridge and Wheathampstead ===
Sandridge and Wheathampstead (2 seats due to by-election)
Party	Candidate	Votes	%	±%
Liberal Democrats	Ann Chance-Read	1,278	44.9	−1.1
Liberal Democrats	Simon Johns*	1,061	37.3	−8.5
Conservative	Gill Clark	666	23.4	−11.0
Conservative	Andrew Waterfield	665	23.3	−11.1
Reform	Nigel Hawes	547	19.2	N/A
Reform	Frederick Philpott	502	17.6	N/A
Green	Danielle Durant-Taylor	352	12.4	−0.4
Green	Oliver Hitch	299	10.5	+0.5
Labour	Denise Brown	132	4.6	−11.6
Labour	Symon Vegro	77	2.7	−13.5
Turnout		2,848	46.0	+10.7
Registered electors		6,194		
Liberal Democrats hold				
Liberal Democrats hold				

=== Sopwell ===
Sopwell
Party	Candidate	Votes	%	±%
Liberal Democrats	Sarwar Shamsher*	1,226	52.9	+2.4
Reform	Jane Dawson-Davis	367	15.8	+9.3
Green	Len Pattenden	344	14.8	+2.9
Labour	Janet Smith	187	8.0	−11.6
Conservative	Heather Rench	171	7.4	−3.2
Communist	Mark Ewington	15	0.6	−0.3
Majority		859	37.1	+6.2
Turnout		2,318	41.6	+6.1
Registered electors		5,572		
Liberal Democrats hold		Swing		

=== St Peters ===
St Peters
Party	Candidate	Votes	%	±%
Liberal Democrats	Sean Hughes	1,347	49.3	+13.1
Green	Sally Leonard	868	31.7	−12.2
Reform	Jim Brodie	240	8.8	N/A
Conservative	Claudio Duran	172	6.3	−2.8
Labour	David Byatt	102	3.7	−7.1
Majority		479	17.6	+9.9
Turnout		2,735	43.7	+9.5
Registered electors		6,261		
Liberal Democrats hold		Swing		

=== St Stephen ===
St Stephen (2 seats due to by-election)
Party	Candidate	Votes	%	±%
Liberal Democrats	Ajanta Hilton*	1,414	45.7	+2.4
Liberal Democrats	Mohammed Rafi	1,175	38.0	−5.3
Reform	Richard Brooks	892	28.8	+22.2
Reform	Stewart Vassie	781	25.2	+18.6
Conservative	Martyn Redstone	671	21.7	−13.6
Conservative	Simin Taheri	502	16.2	−19.1
Green	Gabriel Roberts	218	7.0	+1.0
Green	Ben Tiplady	175	5.7	−0.3
Labour	Janet Blackwell	108	3.5	−5.3
Labour	Jane Hobday	81	2.6	−6.2
Turnout		3,094	45.6	+8.8
Registered electors		6,784		
Liberal Democrats hold				
Liberal Democrats hold				

=== Verulam ===
Verulam
Party	Candidate	Votes	%	±%
Liberal Democrats	Dawn Gamble*	1,679	57.1	−5.1
Conservative	Susan Devi	445	15.1	−6.4
Reform	Alan Dodds	382	13.0	N/A
Green	Kevin Tiplady	300	10.2	+1.3
Labour	Geoff Meade	125	4.2	−3.2
Majority		1,234	42.0	+1.3
Turnout		2,939	50.3	+5.0
Registered electors		5,840		
Liberal Democrats hold		Swing		
