= 2006 St Albans City and District Council election =

2006 UK local government election

Map of the results of the 2006 St Albans City and District Council election. Liberal Democrats in yellow, Conservatives in blue and Labour in red.

The 2006 St Albans City and District Council election took place on 4 May 2006 to elect members of St Albans District Council in Hertfordshire, England. One third of the council was up for election and the Liberal Democrats gained overall control of the council from no overall control.

After the election, the composition of the council was:

- Liberal Democrats 31
- Conservative 17
- Labour 8
- Independent 2

== Campaign ==
Before the election the council was composed of 29 Liberal Democrats, 17 Conservative, 11 Labour and 1 Independent councillors. The Liberal Democrats hoped to win a majority at the election and complained about decisions being delayed by the opposition parties. However the Conservatives were also confident of making gains and said that a hung council with the best councillors from each party making up the cabinet was right for St Albans. Labour meanwhile were hopeful of holding onto their seats, expecting that they would perform better than in recent elections. As well as the 3 main parties on the council, the Green Party also stood candidates in every ward, while targeting Clarence ward as their best chance.

== Election result ==
The Liberal Democrats regained overall control of the council that they had lost at the 1999 election after making a net gain of 2 seats. They gained 3 seats from Labour and 2 from the Conservatives, but also lost 3 seats in Marshalswick South, Redbourn and Verulam to the Conservatives. The 3 defeats for Labour included one in Sopwell ward, which they lost for what was described as "the first time in living memory". The results meant that the Liberal Democrats had a majority over the other parties of 4 seats after previously only having half of the councillors before the election, however the Conservatives did win more votes at the election than the Liberal Democrats. Overall turnout at the election was 45.1%.

In Wheathampstead ward the election ended in a tie after 3 recounts. The winner in the ward was decided by getting the 2 candidates to pick the longer pencil resulting in the Liberal Democrat Judith Shardlow defeating the Conservative former mayor Keith Stammers. Meanwhile, the Conservative group on the council was reduced, when councillor John Newman, left the party to sit as an independent councillor after having recently being replaced as Conservative group leader on the council by Teresa Heritage.

St Albans local election result 2006
Party	Seats	Gains	Losses	Net gain/loss	Seats %	Votes %	Votes	+/−
Liberal Democrats	10	5	3	+2	50.0	35.7	15,694	-2.5%
Conservative	8	3	2	+1	40.0	41.7	18,348	+2.1%
Labour	2	0	3	-3	10.0	14.6	6,426	-2.5%
Green	0	0	0	0	0	8.1	3,549	+7.3%

== Ward results ==
Ashley
Party	Candidate	Votes	%	±%
Liberal Democrats	Anthony Rowlands	844	38.1	−3.1
Labour	Malachy Pakenham	597	26.9	−5.3
Conservative	Rafat Khan	551	24.9	+4.3
Green	Stephen Clough	224	10.1	+10.1
Majority		247	11.2	+2.2
Turnout		2,216	43.7	−0.7
Liberal Democrats gain from Labour		Swing		

Batchwood
Party	Candidate	Votes	%	±%
Labour	Roma Mills	827	38.6	+1.5
Liberal Democrats	Allan Witherick	587	27.4	−7.9
Conservative	Sara Cadish	524	24.5	−3.1
Green	Gillian Mills	204	9.5	+9.5
Majority		240	11.2	+9.4
Turnout		2,142	42.4	+2.3
Labour hold		Swing		

Clarence
Party	Candidate	Votes	%	±%
Liberal Democrats	Joyce Lusby	918	42.7	−4.3
Conservative	Katharine Lifely	596	27.7	+3.2
Labour	David Lee	339	15.8	−4.1
Green	Simon Grover	298	13.9	+5.3
Majority		322	15.0	−7.5
Turnout		2,151	47.3	+0.2
Liberal Democrats hold		Swing		

Colney Heath
Party	Candidate	Votes	%	±%
Liberal Democrats	Ian Day	823	49.3	−8.8
Conservative	Alan Cloke	616	36.9	+5.7
Labour	Gordon Watson	146	8.7	−2.0
Green	Peter Eggleston	84	5.0	+5.0
Majority		207	12.4	−14.5
Turnout		1,669	41.8	−1.9
Liberal Democrats gain from Conservative		Swing		

Cunningham
Party	Candidate	Votes	%	±%
Liberal Democrats	Robert Prowse	898	41.5	−15.7
Conservative	James Vessey	654	30.2	+3.9
Labour	Abdul Kadir	414	19.1	+2.6
Green	Rosalind Hardy	200	9.2	+9.2
Majority		244	11.3	−19.6
Turnout		2,166	46.5	+1.0
Liberal Democrats hold		Swing		

Harpenden East
Party	Candidate	Votes	%	±%
Liberal Democrats	Alison Steer	1,135	45.6	−4.8
Conservative	Michael Wakely	1,044	42.0	+2.5
Labour	David Crew	169	6.8	−3.3
Green	Denise Taylor-Roome	140	5.6	+5.6
Majority		91	3.6	−7.3
Turnout		2,488	48.2	+0.5
Liberal Democrats hold		Swing		

Harpenden North
Party	Candidate	Votes	%	±%
Conservative	Geoffrey Turner	1,236	58.1	+1.2
Liberal Democrats	Jeffrey Phillips	578	27.2	−5.6
Labour	Rosemary Ross	166	7.8	−2.5
Green	Sasha Bradbury	147	6.9	+6.9
Majority		658	30.9	+6.8
Turnout		2,127	42.6	−0.8
Conservative hold		Swing		

Harpenden South
Party	Candidate	Votes	%	±%
Conservative	Teresa Heritage	1,606	72.1	+5.9
Liberal Democrats	Mary Carden	313	14.0	−10.0
Labour	Linda Spiri	160	7.2	−2.6
Green	Eric Harber	150	6.7	+6.7
Majority		1,293	58.1	+15.9
Turnout		2,229	44.1	−0.2
Conservative hold		Swing		

Harpenden West
Party	Candidate	Votes	%	±%
Conservative	Allen Chamberlain	1,606	67.5	+9.8
Liberal Democrats	Mary Skinner	410	17.2	−10.6
Green	Marc Scheimann	207	8.7	+3.5
Labour	Elizabeth Rayner	158	6.6	−2.7
Majority		1,196	50.3	+20.4
Turnout		2,381	44.9	−1.6
Conservative hold		Swing		

London Colney
Party	Candidate	Votes	%	±%
Labour	Etheldreda Gordon	960	44.7	+1.0
Conservative	David Winstone	790	36.8	+1.0
Liberal Democrats	Carol Prowse	241	11.2	−9.3
Green	Kate Metcalf	155	7.2	+7.2
Majority		170	7.9	0.0
Turnout		2,146	35.1	−0.5
Labour hold		Swing		

Marshalswick North
Party	Candidate	Votes	%	±%
Liberal Democrats	Thomas Clegg	1,186	50.6	−1.2
Conservative	John Foster	811	34.6	−4.4
Labour	John Baughan	178	7.6	−1.6
Green	Rosalind Paul	170	7.2	+7.2
Majority		375	16.0	+3.2
Turnout		2,345	50.1	+2.6
Liberal Democrats hold		Swing		

Marshalswick South
Party	Candidate	Votes	%	±%
Conservative	Mehmet Gaygusuz	985	38.9	−1.6
Liberal Democrats	Jennifer Hale	953	37.6	−9.5
Labour	Anthony Nicholson	343	13.5	+1.1
Green	Mark Ewington	251	9.9	+9.9
Majority		32	1.3	
Turnout		2,532	51.1	−0.3
Conservative gain from Liberal Democrats		Swing		

Park Street
Party	Candidate	Votes	%	±%
Liberal Democrats	Aislinn Lee	1,233	52.0	+1.6
Conservative	Margaret Griffiths	868	36.6	−0.5
Labour	Patricia Allen	170	7.2	−5.2
Green	Jack Easton	101	4.3	+4.3
Majority		365	15.4	+2.1
Turnout		2,372	46.2	+4.1
Liberal Democrats hold		Swing		

Redbourn
Party	Candidate	Votes	%	±%
Conservative	Susan Carr	1,039	50.7	+22.7
Liberal Democrats	Ann Manning	745	36.4	+36.4
Labour	Edward Hill	138	6.7	−1.8
Green	Gregory Riener	126	6.2	+6.2
Majority		294	14.3	
Turnout		2,048	44.8	−0.9
Conservative gain from Liberal Democrats		Swing		

Sandridge
Party	Candidate	Votes	%	±%
Conservative	Beric Read	880	55.8	+1.1
Liberal Democrats	Janet Churchard	403	25.6	−7.5
Labour	Michael Mulholland	151	9.6	−2.6
Green	Lorna-May Caddy	143	9.1	+9.1
Majority		477	30.2	+8.6
Turnout		1,577	42.8	+3.3
Conservative hold		Swing		

Sopwell
Party	Candidate	Votes	%	±%
Liberal Democrats	David Poor	671	33.2	+3.2
Labour	Dawn Pratley	605	29.9	−10.1
Conservative	Heather Rench	516	25.5	−4.5
Green	Thomas Hardy	230	11.4	+11.4
Majority		66	3.3	
Turnout		2,022	40.3	+4.3
Liberal Democrats gain from Labour		Swing		

St Peters
Party	Candidate	Votes	%	±%
Liberal Democrats	Michael Green	915	45.4	−1.9
Labour	Winifred Dunleavy	464	23.0	−6.4
Conservative	Debashis Mukherjee	398	19.7	+1.2
Green	Kristian Tizzard	240	11.9	+11.9
Majority		451	22.4	+4.5
Turnout		2,017	39.7	−2.2
Liberal Democrats gain from Labour		Swing		

St Stephen
Party	Candidate	Votes	%	±%
Conservative	Patricia Garrard	1,329	58.4	−2.2
Liberal Democrats	David Parry	593	26.1	−4.9
Labour	Janet Blackwell	201	8.8	+0.5
Green	Margaret Davis	153	6.7	+6.7
Majority		736	32.3	+2.7
Turnout		2,276	46.5	−1.2
Conservative hold		Swing		

Verulam
Party	Candidate	Votes	%	±%
Conservative	Irene Willcocks	1,167	44.2	−1.5
Liberal Democrats	Susan Campbell	1,116	42.3	+2.7
Green	Margaret Grover	211	8.0	+8.0
Labour	Jane Cloke	146	5.5	−1.6
Majority		51	1.9	−4.2
Turnout		2,640	53.5	−0.3
Conservative gain from Liberal Democrats		Swing		

Wheathampstead
Party	Candidate	Votes	%	±%
Liberal Democrats	Judith Shardlow	1,132	45.8	−2.5
Conservative	Keith Stammers	1,132	45.8	+0.7
Green	Gillian Patrick	115	4.7	+4.7
Labour	Peter Woodhams	94	3.8	−2.9
Majority		0	0	−3.2
Turnout		2,473	54.1	+2.4
Liberal Democrats gain from Conservative		Swing		
