= 2008 St Albans City and District Council election =

2008 UK local government election

Map of the results of the 2008 St Albans City and District Council election. Liberal Democrats in yellow, Conservatives in blue and independent in light grey. Wards in dark grey were not contested in 2008.

The 2008 St Albans City and District Council election took place on 1 May 2008 to elect members of St Albans District Council in Hertfordshire, England. One third of the council was up for election and the Liberal Democrats gained overall control of the council from no overall control.

After the election, the composition of the council was:

- Liberal Democrats 30
- Conservative 22
- Labour 5
- Independent 1

== Background ==
Before the election the Liberal Democrats had 29 seats, compared to 19 for the Conservatives, 8 for Labour and there were 2 Independents. 18 of the 20 wards were contested in 2008, with only Colney Heath and Sandridge wards not having an election. Each of the Liberal Democrat, Conservative, Labour and Green parties contested every seat, apart from in Redbourn where the Liberal Democrats did not put up a candidate against the sitting independent councillor Tony Swendell.

3 Liberal Democrat councillors, Brian Peyton, Brian Sinfield and Jenny Stroud, and 2 Conservative councillors, Clare Ellis and Liz Stevenson, stood down at the election. Independent, former Conservative, councillor John Newman also did not defend his seat in Harpenden West after moving to Dorset.

== Election result ==
The Liberal Democrats regained an overall majority of 2 on the council with 30 councillors, after making a net gain of one seat. They gained seats in Batchwood, Sopwell and Verulam wards, but lost Harpenden East and Wheathampstead to the Conservatives, who increased to 22 seats on the council. The Labour party lost all of the seats they had been defending, including London Colney to the Conservatives, to fall to 5 seats on the council, while independent Tony Swendell held his seat in Redbourn. Labour blamed their defeats on voters protesting against the national Labour government. Overall turnout was 42.5%, a drop from 43.6% at the 2007 election.

Following the election the national Liberal Democrat leader Nick Clegg came to St Albans to celebrate the results.

St Albans local election result 2008
Party	Seats	Gains	Losses	Net gain/loss	Seats %	Votes %	Votes	+/−
Liberal Democrats	10	3	2	+1	55.6	34.3	13,642	-3.5%
Conservative	7	4	1	+3	38.9	43.2	17,184	+0.6%
Independent	1	0	1	-1	5.6	3.2	1,258	+3.2%
Labour	0	0	3	-3	0	12.6	5,031	-0.3%
Green	0	0	0	0	0	6.7	2,675	-0.1%

== Ward results ==
Ashley
Party	Candidate	Votes	%	±%
Liberal Democrats	Mike Ellis	1,016	50.0	+8.7
Conservative	Guy Young	521	25.6	+1.3
Labour	Alistair Cooper	272	13.4	−6.9
Green	Graham Ward	223	11.0	−3.1
Majority		495	24.4	+7.4
Turnout		2,032	37.7	+1.5
Liberal Democrats hold		Swing		

Batchwood
Party	Candidate	Votes	%	±%
Liberal Democrats	Allan Witherick	864	39.4	+9.3
Labour	David McManus	702	32.0	−2.6
Conservative	Indranil Chakravorty	454	20.7	−5.0
Green	Naomi Love	174	7.9	−1.7
Majority		162	7.4	
Turnout		2,194	40.9	+2.3
Liberal Democrats gain from Labour		Swing		

Clarence
Party	Candidate	Votes	%	±%
Liberal Democrats	Christopher White	979	47.6	−6.3
Conservative	Dursun Altun	629	30.6	+8.8
Green	Pete Eggleston	237	11.5	−1.3
Labour	Richard Harris	211	10.3	−1.2
Majority		350	17.0	−15.1
Turnout		2,056	43.3	+0.5
Liberal Democrats hold		Swing		

Cunningham
Party	Candidate	Votes	%	±%
Liberal Democrats	Geoff Harrison	971	49.0	−4.9
Conservative	James Vessey	659	33.3	+5.4
Labour	John Paton	208	10.5	−0.4
Green	Jack Easton	143	7.2	−0.1
Majority		312	15.7	−10.3
Turnout		1,981	41.4	−2.5
Liberal Democrats hold		Swing		

Harpenden East
Party	Candidate	Votes	%	±%
Conservative	Julie Bell	1,259	51.6	+1.3
Liberal Democrats	Jeffrey Phillips	944	38.7	+0.9
Labour	David Crew	158	6.5	−0.7
Green	Lydia El-Khouri	81	3.3	−1.3
Majority		315	12.9	+0.4
Turnout		2,442	46.4	+1.1
Conservative gain from Liberal Democrats		Swing		

Harpenden North
Party	Candidate	Votes	%	±%
Conservative	John Chambers	1,201	64.4	+0.7
Liberal Democrats	Gordon Burrow	394	21.1	−0.1
Labour	Rosemary Ross	142	7.6	−0.8
Green	Annett Tate	127	6.8	+0.1
Majority		807	43.3	+0.5
Turnout		1,864	36.3	−2.8
Conservative hold		Swing		

Harpenden South
Party	Candidate	Votes	%	±%
Conservative	Stuart Roberts	1,518	75.2	+1.0
Liberal Democrats	Paul Spinks	278	13.8	+1.8
Labour	Linda Spiri	126	6.2	−1.9
Green	Lorna Hann	96	4.8	−1.0
Majority		1,240	61.4	−0.8
Turnout		2,018	38.4	−2.6
Conservative hold		Swing		

Harpenden West
Party	Candidate	Votes	%	±%
Conservative	Allen Chamberlain	1,495	68.0	+2.4
Liberal Democrats	Albert Moses	418	19.0	±0.0
Labour	Benjamin Dearman	160	7.3	−1.0
Green	Tim Blackwell	125	5.7	−4.4
Majority		1,077	49.0	
Turnout		2,198	39.6	−4.0
Conservative gain from Independent		Swing		

London Colney
Party	Candidate	Votes	%	±%
Conservative	Dave Winstone	1,175	47.5	+4.0
Labour	Chris Flynn	1,044	42.2	−3.1
Liberal Democrats	Mike Ketley	140	5.7	−5.6
Green	Rosalind Hardy	113	4.6	+4.6
Majority		131	5.3	
Turnout		2,472	36.6	+6.2
Conservative gain from Labour		Swing		

Marshalswick North
Party	Candidate	Votes	%	±%
Liberal Democrats	Janet Churchyard	1,174	51.4	−3.2
Conservative	Seema Kennedy	874	38.2	+4.4
Labour	Ruairi McCourt	128	5.6	−0.7
Green	Rosalind Paul	109	4.8	−0.5
Majority		300	13.2	−7.6
Turnout		2,285	47.4	+1.5
Liberal Democrats hold		Swing		

Marshalswick South
Party	Candidate	Votes	%	±%
Liberal Democrats	Melvyn Teare	1,190	47.7	−0.1
Conservative	Sabena Khan	848	34.0	−0.2
Labour	Anthony Nicholson	254	10.2	−0.8
Green	Gillian Mills	202	8.1	+1.1
Majority		342	13.7	+0.1
Turnout		2,494	48.1	−0.2
Liberal Democrats hold		Swing		

Park Street
Party	Candidate	Votes	%	±%
Liberal Democrats	David Yates	1,125	50.8	+1.3
Conservative	Mary Zambra	861	38.9	+0.4
Labour	Alex Breed	153	6.9	−0.7
Green	Stephen Clough	74	3.3	−1.1
Majority		264	11.9	+0.9
Turnout		2,213	41.4	+0.8
Liberal Democrats hold		Swing		

Redbourn
Party	Candidate	Votes	%	±%
Independent	Tony Swendell	1,258	59.8	+59.8
Conservative	Roger Gray	687	32.7	−13.7
Labour	Richard Bruckdorfer	81	3.9	−0.5
Green	Kate Metcalf	77	3.7	+0.1
Majority		571	27.1	+26.3
Turnout		2,103	44.8	−2.3
Independent hold		Swing		

Sopwell
Party	Candidate	Votes	%	±%
Liberal Democrats	Roger Axworthy	711	34.5	+2.3
Labour	Janet Smith	707	34.3	−2.7
Conservative	Mary Murphy	462	22.4	+1.7
Green	Thomas Hardy	183	8.9	−1.2
Majority		4	0.2	
Turnout		2,063	40.2	+2.1
Liberal Democrats gain from Labour		Swing		

St Peters
Party	Candidate	Votes	%	±%
Liberal Democrats	Martin Morris	773	36.5	−3.5
Conservative	Nadia Davies	661	31.2	+8.5
Green	Simon Grover	362	17.1	−1.7
Labour	Michael Jewitt	321	15.2	−4.3
Majority		112	5.3	−13.0
Turnout		2,117	38.8	+2.0
Liberal Democrats hold		Swing		

St Stephen
Party	Candidate	Votes	%	±%
Conservative	David Canham	1,542	72.0	+12.9
Liberal Democrats	Tom Allum	357	16.7	−11.8
Labour	Janet Blackwell	153	7.1	−1.0
Green	Lucy Eggleston	89	4.2	−0.1
Majority		1,185	55.3	+24.7
Turnout		2,141	42.7	+0.8
Conservative hold		Swing		

Verulam
Party	Candidate	Votes	%	±%
Liberal Democrats	Fred Wartenberg	1,273	47.5	−4.4
Conservative	Nigel Smith	1,098	41.0	+3.3
Green	Margaret Grover	185	6.9	+1.2
Labour	Jill Gipps	125	4.7	0.0
Majority		175	6.5	−7.7
Turnout		2,681	52.5	+0.2
Liberal Democrats gain from Conservative		Swing		

Wheathampstead
Party	Candidate	Votes	%	±%
Conservative	Gillian Clark	1,240	50.9	+6.3
Liberal Democrats	Paul Edelston	1,035	42.5	−5.9
Labour	Peter Woodhams	86	3.5	+0.3
Green	Simon Wakeling	75	3.1	−0.7
Majority		205	8.4	
Turnout		2,436	52.5	−1.6
Conservative gain from Liberal Democrats		Swing		

== By-elections between 2008 and 2010 ==
A by-election was held in Harpenden South on 4 June 2009 after Conservative councillor Paul Foster resigned from the council. The seat was held for the Conservatives by Brian Ellis with a majority of 899 votes over the Labour Party.

Harpenden South by-election 4 June 2009
Party	Candidate	Votes	%	±%
Conservative	Brian Ellis	1,602	53.5	−21.8
Labour	Richard Lane	703	23.5	+17.2
Liberal Democrats	Albert Moses	427	14.3	+0.5
Green	Annett Tate	264	8.8	+4.1
Majority		899	30.0	
Turnout		2,996		
Conservative hold		Swing		
