= 2014 St Albans City and District Council election =

English local election

Map of the results of the 2014 St Albans City and District Council election. Conservatives in blue, Liberal Democrats in yellow and Labour in red.

The 2014 St Albans City and District Council election took place on 22 May 2014 to elect members of St Albans District Council in Hertfordshire, England. One third of the council was up for election and the council stayed under no overall control.

After the election, the composition of the council was:

- Conservative 29
- Liberal Democrats 17
- Labour 10
- Green 1
- Independent 1

== Background ==
Before the election the Conservatives had half of the seats on the council with 29 councillors, while the Liberal Democrats had 19 seats, Labour had 8 and both the Greens and an independent had 1 seat. 20 seats were contested in 2014 with each of the Conservative, Liberal Democrat and Labour parties putting up a full 20 candidates. The Green Party stood 16 candidates, while the UK Independence Party had a big increase in candidates after only standing in 2 wards at the 2012 election.

== Election result ==
The Conservatives remained the largest party on the council with 29 seats, but failed to win a majority on the council. Labour gained 2 seats to have 10 councillors, taking London Colney from the Conservatives and a narrow 32 vote gain in Sopwell from the Liberal Democrats after a recount. The Liberal Democrats dropped to 17 seats and blamed their loss of a seat in St Peters ward to the Conservatives on votes for the Green Party, who came a close third in the ward. The UK Independence Party failed to win any seats but came second in Sandridge, and third in St Stephen ward where 2 seats were contested. Overall turnout at the election was 42.77%.

St Albans local election result 2014
Party	Seats	Gains	Losses	Net gain/loss	Seats %	Votes %	Votes	+/−
Conservative	12	2	2	0	54.5	38.5	19,044	+0.6
Liberal Democrats	7	1	3	-2	31.8	23.2	11,477	-1.8
Labour	3	2	0	+2	13.6	19.2	9,503	-2.8
UKIP	0	0	0	0	0.0	9.5	4,705	+8.8
Green	0	0	0	0	0.0	6.9	3,424	-1.7
Independent	0	0	0	0	0.0	2.5	1,241	-3.1
TUSC	0	0	0	0	0.0	0.0	14	0.0

== Ward results ==
Ashley
Party	Candidate	Votes	%	±%
Liberal Democrats	Anthony Rowlands	1,131	42.5	+9.8
Labour	Anne Lyons	738	27.7	−8.1
Conservative	Chris Dey	373	14.0	−6.1
UKIP	Michael Mason	244	9.2	+9.2
Green	Mike George	177	6.6	−4.9
Majority		393	14.8	
Turnout		2,663	46.0	+8
Liberal Democrats hold		Swing		

Batchwood
Party	Candidate	Votes	%	±%
Labour	Roma Mills	1,130	49.2	+0.7
Conservative	Tim Smith	512	22.3	+0.9
UKIP	Colin Donald	272	11.8	+11.8
Liberal Democrats	Jon Humphrey	219	9.5	−11.3
Green	Lee Evans	163	7.1	−2.2
Majority		618	26.9	−0.2
Turnout		2,296	41.5	+8
Labour hold		Swing		

Clarence
Party	Candidate	Votes	%	±%
Liberal Democrats	Gerard McHale	764	32.5	−10.0
Conservative	Joe Hames	579	24.6	+0.7
Labour	Helen Ives-Rose	483	20.5	+2.0
Green	Jack Easton	367	15.6	+0.5
UKIP	Beverley Rands	145	6.2	+6.2
TUSC	Keith Hussey	14	0.6	+0.6
Majority		185	7.9	−10.8
Turnout		2,352	44.8	+5
Liberal Democrats hold		Swing		

Colney Heath
Party	Candidate	Votes	%	±%
Liberal Democrats	Jamie Day	751	41.3	−18.5
Conservative	Jonathan Marks	353	19.4	−4.1
UKIP	Christopher Thorpe	339	18.6	+18.6
Labour	John Paton	273	15.0	+3.2
Green	Steve Clough	104	5.7	+0.8
Majority		398	21.9	−14.5
Turnout		1,820	41.6	−6.4
Liberal Democrats hold		Swing		

Cunningham
Party	Candidate	Votes	%	±%
Liberal Democrats	Rob Prowse	701	32.5	−7.0
Labour	Vivienne Windle	484	22.5	+1.8
Conservative	Jim Vessey	427	19.8	−1.4
UKIP	Alan Malin	400	18.6	+10.5
Green	Gregory Riener	143	6.6	+0.5
Majority		217	10.1	−8.2
Turnout		2,155	43.7	+6
Liberal Democrats hold		Swing		

Harpenden East
Party	Candidate	Votes	%	±%
Conservative	Mary Maynard	966	44.0	−9.2
Independent	Pip Martyn	677	30.9	+30.9
Liberal Democrats	Mike Waddilove	278	12.7	−11.6
Labour	Rosemary Ross	273	12.4	−2.1
Majority		289	13.2	−15.7
Turnout		2,194	39.8	+8
Conservative hold		Swing		

Harpenden North
Party	Candidate	Votes	%	±%
Conservative	Geoffrey Turner	902	45.9	−1.0
Independent	John Chambers	302	15.4	−9.8
Labour	Linda Spiri	276	14.0	+0.9
Independent	Paul Howe	262	13.3	+13.3
Liberal Democrats	Pauline Waddilove	224	11.4	+1.5
Majority		600	30.5	+8.9
Turnout		1,966	37.3	+5
Conservative hold		Swing		

Harpenden South
Party	Candidate	Votes	%	±%
Conservative	Teresa Heritage	1,565	72.9	+1.8
Labour	Michael Gray-Higgins	306	14.3	+2.4
Liberal Democrats	Maria Moyses	275	12.8	+1.9
Majority		1,259	58.7	−0.4
Turnout		2,146	39.9	+6
Conservative hold		Swing		

Harpenden West
Party	Candidate	Votes	%	±%
Conservative	Julian Daly	1,599	67.6	+0.8
Liberal Democrats	Jeffrey Phillips	402	17.0	+3.1
Labour	David Lawlor	364	15.4	+2.9
Majority		1,197	50.6	−2.3
Turnout		2,365	41.5	+7
Conservative hold		Swing		

London Colney
Party	Candidate	Votes	%	±%
Labour	Katherine Gardner	1,066	39.9	−7.2
Conservative	Simon Calder	853	31.9	−5.0
UKIP	David Kilpatrick	502	18.8	N/A
Liberal Democrats	Margaret Price	126	4.7	+0.1
Green	William Simmons	124	4.6	−3.4
Majority		213	8.0	
Turnout		2,671	37.7	+3
Labour gain from Conservative		Swing		

Marshalswick North
Party	Candidate	Votes	%	±%
Liberal Democrats	Tom Clegg	803	36.4	−8.1
Conservative	Lyn Bolton	627	28.4	−7.3
UKIP	Michael Hollins	380	17.2	+17.2
Labour	Jane Cloke	233	10.6	−1.4
Green	Claire Gilbert	162	7.3	−0.5
Majority		176	8.0	−0.8
Turnout		2,205	44.1	+4
Liberal Democrats hold		Swing		

Marshalswick South
Party	Candidate	Votes	%	±%
Conservative	Seema Kennedy	972	38.6	−1.2
Labour	Anthony Nicolson	573	22.7	+3.8
Liberal Democrats	Mark Pedroz	486	19.3	−8.6
Green	Katherine Reeve	258	10.2	+2.1
UKIP	David Dickson	232	9.2	+3.9
Majority		399	15.8	+3.9
Turnout		2,521	47.0	+3
Conservative gain from Liberal Democrats		Swing		

Park Street
Party	Candidate	Votes	%	±%
Liberal Democrats	Aislinn Lee	976	40.1	−5.6
Conservative	Stella Nash	649	26.7	−10.3
UKIP	Roger Gray	493	20.3	+20.3
Labour	Martin McGrath	228	9.4	−3.1
Green	Rosalind Paul	85	3.5	−1.3
Majority		327	13.5	+4.8
Turnout		2,431	42.3	+6
Liberal Democrats hold		Swing		

Redbourn
Party	Candidate	Votes	%	±%
Conservative	Victoria Mead	1,194	62.4	+30.8
Labour	Nick Pullinger	363	19.0	+10.1
Liberal Democrats	Michael Morton	189	9.9	+9.9
Green	Lydia El-Khouri	168	8.8	+8.8
Majority		831	43.4	
Turnout		1,914	39.5	−1
Conservative hold		Swing		

Sandridge
Party	Candidate	Votes	%	±%
Conservative	Beric Read	770	46.1	−9.7
UKIP	John Stocker	304	18.2	+18.2
Liberal Democrats	Sheila Clegg	248	14.9	−5.5
Labour	Richard Harris	198	11.9	−3.9
Green	Paul Quinn	149	8.9	+0.8
Majority		466	27.9	−7.5
Turnout		1,669	44.1	−7
Conservative hold		Swing		

Sopwell
Party	Candidate	Votes	%	±%
Labour	Iain Grant	840	34.6	−12.5
Liberal Democrats	David Poor	808	33.3	+6.6
Conservative	Nick Chivers	309	12.7	−4.6
UKIP	Greg Peachey	306	12.6	+12.6
Green	Kate Metcalf	166	6.8	−3.0
Majority		32	1.3	−20.1
Turnout		2,429	45.5	+11
Labour gain from Liberal Democrats		Swing		

St Peters
Party	Candidate	Votes	%	±%
Conservative	Alun Davies	667	25.6	+3.7
Liberal Democrats	Michael Green	624	24.0	+4.1
Green	Jill Mills	616	23.6	−11.1
Labour	Rebecca Rideal	539	20.7	−2.7
UKIP	Daragh Cahalane	159	6.1	+6.1
Majority		43	1.6	
Turnout		2,605	42.3	+6
Conservative gain from Liberal Democrats		Swing		

St Stephen (2 seats)
Party	Candidate	Votes	%	±%
Conservative	Sue Featherstone	1,340	54.1	−3.6
Conservative	Dave Winstone	923	37.2	−20.5
UKIP	Peter Whitehead	618	24.9	N/A
Liberal Democrats	David Parry	513	20.7	−2.2
Liberal Democrats	Alison Ross	492	19.9	−3.0
Labour	Janet Blackwell	229	9.2	−3.5
Green	Lesley Baker	197	7.9	+1.1
Labour	James Hopkins	162	6.5	−6.2
Turnout		2,478	46.2	+11
Conservative hold		Swing		
Conservative hold		Swing		

Verulam
Party	Candidate	Votes	%	±%
Liberal Democrats	Edgar Hill	1,018	37.8	−12.4
Conservative	Steve McKeown	916	34.0	+1.8
UKIP	Paul Tilyard	311	11.6	+11.6
Labour	Heather Troy	234	8.7	−0.1
Green	Margaret Grover	213	7.9	−0.9
Majority		102	3.8	−14.2
Turnout		2,692	49.4	+2
Liberal Democrats gain from Conservative		Swing		

Wheathampstead (2 seats)
Party	Candidate	Votes	%	±%
Conservative	Annie Brewster	1,445	67.3	+13.6
Conservative	Sandra Wood	1,103	51.4	−2.3
Liberal Democrats	Harriet Sherlock	449	20.9	−10.6
Green	Ian Troughton	332	15.5	+9.6
Labour	David Cheale	307	14.3	+5.4
Labour	Gavin Ross	204	9.5	+0.6
Turnout		2,148	44.4	+2
Conservative hold		Swing		
Conservative hold		Swing		

== By-elections between 2014 and 2015 ==
A by-election was held in Marshalswick South on 29 January 2015 for 2 seats on the council after the resignation of Conservative councillors Heidi Allen and Seema Kennedy. The 2 seats were held for Conservatives by Steve McKeown and Richard Curthoys with 667 and 647 votes respectively.

Marshalswick South by-election 29 January 2015 (2 seats)
Party	Candidate	Votes	%	±%
Conservative	Steve McKeown	667	33.5	−5.1
Conservative	Richard Curthoys	647	32.5	−6.1
Liberal Democrats	Mark Pedroz	495	24.9	+5.6
Liberal Democrats	Elizabeth Needham	488	24.5	+5.2
Green	Jill Mills	450	22.6	+12.4
Labour	Richard Harris	406	20.4	−2.3
Labour	Vivienne Windle	312	15.7	−7.0
Green	Tim Robinson	166	8.3	−1.9
UKIP	David Dickson	148	7.4	−1.8
UKIP	Michael Hollins	147	7.4	−1.8
Turnout		1,989	37.5	−9.5
Conservative hold		Swing		
Conservative hold		Swing		
