= Bobinogs =

British children's television series

- Voices of: Martyn Ellis; Michelle McTernan; Dionne Morgan; Olwen Rees; Morgan Hopkins
- Country of origin: United Kingdom
- Original language: English
- No. of seasons: 6
- No. of episodes: 65

Production
- Executive producers: Mellie Buse; Martin Franks; Simon Grover; Elen Rhys
- Producer: Elen Rhys
- Production company: BBC Cymru Wales (Note: Animation production by Siriol Productions (Series 1-3) and Calon (Series 4-6))

Original release
- Network: CBeebies
- Release: 16 January 2003 – 10 March 2008

Bobinogs (original Welsh title: Bobinogi) is a British children's television programme that aired on CBeebies, and it was produced by BBC Cymru Wales. It debuted in the United Kingdom in 2003.

The episodes are 15 minutes long, consisting mostly of flash animation, but clips of real life scenarios are also used. These clips were filmed at various nursery schools across Wales. The series has won awards from BAFTA Cymru and the Celtic Media Festival.

Animation production for the third season was taken over by Calon in 2005, following Siriol Productions' move to their London headquarters.

A spin off series of four books were published by Gomer Press.

== Plot and main characters ==
The three main characters live in a house shaped like a bobble hat in a school boy named Owen's bedroom. The main characters play in a band and help Owen solve everyday problems, then perform a song about it at the end. At one point in every episode, they would obtain a clue to the problem's solution by looking through their "bobinoculars", which show video footage from the real world.

- Owen: Played by David Pursey
- Ogi: Drums and DJ, Voiced by Martyn Ellis
- Bobin: Keyboards, Voiced by Dionne Morgan
- Nib: Vocals, Voiced by Michelle McTernan
- Bobinoculars: Voiced by Martyn Ellis

== Other characters ==
- Mamgu Bobknot, Voiced by Olwen Rees
- Olly Mindybob, Voiced by Martyn Ellis
- Robina, Voiced by Dionne Morgan
- Molly Mindybob, Voiced by Olwen Rees
- Fireman Prout, Voiced by Martyn Ellis
- Nibbin, Voiced by Michelle McTernan
- Phil the Shelf, Voiced by Martyn Ellis
- Mal Mechanic, Voiced by Martyn Ellis (series 1), Morgan Hopkins (series 2 and 3)
- Cyril the Dragon, Voiced by Martyn Ellis
- Brenda the Bus, Voiced by Dionne Morgan
- Ffion the Farmer, Voiced by Michelle McTernan
- Nogdog, Vocals by Martyn Ellis and Morgan Hopkins
