= 2003 St Albans City and District Council election =

2003 UK local government election

Map of the results of the 2003 St Albans City and District Council election. Liberal Democrats in yellow, Conservatives in blue and Labour in red.

The 2003 St Albans City and District Council election took place on 1 May 2003 to elect members of St Albans District Council in Hertfordshire, England. One third of the council was up for election and the council stayed under no overall control.

After the election, the composition of the council was:

- Liberal Democrats 23
- Conservative 21
- Labour 13
- Independent 1

== Background ==
Following the last election in 2002 the Conservatives were the largest party with 21 seats, compared to 20 for the Liberal Democrats, 15 for Labour, 1 independent and 1 seat was vacant. However the Liberal Democrats gained a seat from the Conservatives at a by-election in Verulam, which meant that going into the 2003 election both the Conservatives and Liberal Democrats needed to gain 8 seats to win a majority.

== Voting trial ==
The election saw a trial of various voting methods. Voters could choose between e-voting, either by computer or on a touchscreen at a polling booth, voting by phone or by post, or on a traditional ballot paper. The period for voting was also increased to allow voting from 28 April to 1 May 2003.

However problems occurred at 15 polling stations where the system did not recognise voters pin numbers, which meant that traditional paper ballots had to be used in those polling stations. The issues meant the election nearly had to be voided, with the count only able to start over 3 hours after polls had closed.

However turnout was up by 5% on the previous election in 2002 at 43%.

== Election result ==
The Liberal Democrats gained 2 seats from Labour to become the largest party on the council with 23 councillors. The Conservatives remained on 21 seats and there was still 1 independent, while the losses for Labour in Ashley and St Peter's wards reduced them to 13 seats.

Following the election the Liberal Democrat group on the council chose Robert Donald as their new leader taking over from Brian Peyton.

St Albans local election result 2003
Party	Seats	Gains	Losses	Net gain/loss	Seats %	Votes %	Votes	+/−
Liberal Democrats	12	2	0	+2	57.1	43.8	18,710	+5.0%
Conservative	5	0	0	0	23.8	35.4	15,126	-0.4%
Labour	4	0	2	-2	19.0	20.6	8,784	-4.5%
No Candidate Deserves My Vote!	0	0	0	0	0	0.1	63	-0.2%

== Ward results ==
Ashley
Party	Candidate	Votes	%	±%
Liberal Democrats	Alan Marshall	942	43.4	+6.9
Labour	Alistair Cooper	759	35.0	−6.3
Conservative	Alec Campbell	468	21.6	+1.1
Majority		183	8.4	
Turnout		2,169	44.4	
Liberal Democrats gain from Labour		Swing		

Batchwood
Party	Candidate	Votes	%	±%
Labour	Martin Leach	873	47.1	
Conservative	Lee Foster	492	26.6	
Liberal Democrats	Debbie Williams	488	26.3	
Majority		381	20.5	
Turnout		1,853	37.6	
Labour hold		Swing		

Clarence
Party	Candidate	Votes	%	±%
Liberal Democrats	Sheila Burton	1,315	65.3	+6.1
Labour	Clive Newport	356	17.7	−5.2
Conservative	Louisa-Jane Rosalki	343	17.0	−0.9
Majority		959	47.6	+11.3
Turnout		2,014	45.8	
Liberal Democrats hold		Swing		

Colney Heath
Party	Candidate	Votes	%	±%
Liberal Democrats	Christopher Brazier	972	58.1	+21.7
Conservative	David Johns	522	31.2	−12.8
Labour	David Mclean	179	10.7	−8.9
Majority		450	26.9	
Turnout		1,673	43.7	
Liberal Democrats hold		Swing		

Cunningham
Party	Candidate	Votes	%	±%
Liberal Democrats	Robert Donald	1,281	61.3	+18.0
Labour	Rebecca Gumbrell-Mccormick	416	19.9	−16.1
Conservative	James Vessey	394	18.8	−1.9
Majority		865	41.4	+34.1
Turnout		2,091	46.2	
Liberal Democrats hold		Swing		

Harpenden East
Party	Candidate	Votes	%	±%
Liberal Democrats	Michael Waddilove	1,149	50.2	+3.5
Conservative	Elizabeth Stevenson	854	37.3	−1.0
Labour	David Crew	286	12.5	−2.5
Majority		295	12.9	+4.5
Turnout		2,289	45.5	
Liberal Democrats hold		Swing		

Harpenden North
Party	Candidate	Votes	%	±%
Conservative	Albert Pawle	1,046	51.1	+3.2
Liberal Democrats	Rachel Andrew	785	38.4	−3.2
Labour	Rosemary Ross	214	10.5	+0.0
Majority		261	12.7	+6.4
Turnout		2,045	41.6	
Conservative hold		Swing		

Harpenden South
Party	Candidate	Votes	%	±%
Conservative	Paul Foster	1,340	61.7	−1.7
Liberal Democrats	Christopher Canfield	616	28.4	+5.1
Labour	David Lawlor	216	9.9	−3.4
Majority		724	33.3	−6.8
Turnout		2,172	43.2	
Conservative hold		Swing		

Harpenden West
Party	Candidate	Votes	%	±%
Conservative	Julian Daly	1,319	56.3	−3.8
Liberal Democrats	Mary Skinner	753	32.1	+7.0
Labour	Benjamin Dearman	271	11.6	−3.2
Majority		566	24.2	−10.8
Turnout		2,343	43.6	
Conservative hold		Swing		

London Colney
Party	Candidate	Votes	%	±%
Labour	Malcolm Macmillan	1,062	57.7	−4.2
Conservative	Gilbert Massara	472	25.6	+2.1
Liberal Democrats	Carol Prowse	308	16.7	+2.1
Majority		590	32.1	−6.3
Turnout		1,842	33.2	
Labour hold		Swing		

Marshalswick North
Party	Candidate	Votes	%	±%
Liberal Democrats	Geoffrey Churchard	1,003	48.5	+1.0
Conservative	John Foster	782	37.8	+1.3
Labour	John Baughan	282	13.6	−2.5
Majority		221	10.7	−0.3
Turnout		2,067	43.6	
Liberal Democrats hold		Swing		

Marshalswick South
Party	Candidate	Votes	%	±%
Liberal Democrats	Kathleen Morris	1,364	53.3	−4.5
Conservative	Richard Bretherton	858	33.5	+5.0
Labour	Jane Cloke	338	13.2	−0.5
Majority		506	19.8	−9.5
Turnout		2,560	52.7	
Liberal Democrats hold		Swing		

Park Street
Party	Candidate	Votes	%	±%
Liberal Democrats	Stephanie White	1,130	57.7	−7.8
Conservative	Timothy Randall	554	28.3	+6.8
Labour	Janet Blackwell	276	14.1	+1.1
Majority		576	29.4	−14.6
Turnout		1,960	38.8	
Liberal Democrats hold		Swing		

Redbourn
Party	Candidate	Votes	%	±%
Liberal Democrats	Christopher O'Donovan	1,019	50.5	−1.8
Conservative	Maria Maynard	836	41.4	+1.9
Labour	Linda Spiri	164	8.1	−0.2
Majority		183	9.1	−3.7
Turnout		2,019	45.7	
Liberal Democrats hold		Swing		

Sandridge
Party	Candidate	Votes	%	±%
Conservative	Christopher Whiteside	769	54.7	+13.4
Liberal Democrats	Peter Klyhn	465	33.1	−6.9
Labour	John Baker	171	12.2	−4.8
Majority		304	21.6	+20.3
Turnout		1,405	39.5	
Conservative hold		Swing		

Sopwell (2 seats)
Party	Candidate	Votes	%	±%
Labour	Eileen Harris	781	49.6	−8.7
Labour	Janet Smith	777	49.4	−8.9
Liberal Democrats	Brian Sinfield	397	25.2	+8.0
Liberal Democrats	David Terrar	375	23.8	+6.6
Conservative	Eileen Brown	356	22.6	+1.3
Conservative	Margaret Brownlie	344	21.9	+0.6
Turnout		1,574	32.4	+9.1
Labour hold		Swing		
Labour hold		Swing		

St Peters
Party	Candidate	Votes	%	±%
Liberal Democrats	Richard Biddle	927	46.1	+8.0
Labour	Lynette Warren	715	35.6	−8.1
Conservative	Virginia Walker	367	18.3	+0.1
Majority		212	10.5	
Turnout		2,009	42.1	
Liberal Democrats gain from Labour		Swing		

St Stephen
Party	Candidate	Votes	%	±%
Conservative	Gordon Myland	1,247	58.1	+2.8
Liberal Democrats	Louise Searle	634	29.5	−0.2
Labour	Patricia Allen	266	12.4	−2.6
Majority		613	28.6	+3.0
Turnout		2,147	43.7	
Conservative hold		Swing		

Verulam
Party	Candidate	Votes	%	±%
Liberal Democrats	Martin Frearson	1,457	52.6	+15.5
Conservative	Robin Streames	1,033	37.3	−11.4
Labour	Richard Bruckdorfer	217	7.8	−4.9
No Candidate Deserves My Vote!	Peter Goodall	63	2.3	+0.8
Majority		424	15.3	
Turnout		2,770	56.3	+17.4
Liberal Democrats hold		Swing		

Wheathampstead
Party	Candidate	Votes	%	±%
Liberal Democrats	Christopher Oxley	1,330	59.8	+16.8
Conservative	Linda Brent	730	32.8	−15.6
Labour	Mary Cheale	165	7.4	−1.3
Majority		600	27.0	
Turnout		2,225	48.9	
Liberal Democrats hold		Swing		

== By-elections between 2003 and 2004 ==
A by-election was held in Verulam ward on 5 April 2004 after the resignation of Conservative councillor Pauline Buffham, who was moving abroad. The seat was gained for the Liberal Democrats by Susan Campbell with a majority of 265 votes over the Conservatives.

Verulam by-election 5 April 2004
Party	Candidate	Votes	%	±%
Liberal Democrats	Susan Campbell	1,173	49.4	−3.2
Conservative	Katherine Cramer	908	38.2	+0.9
St Albans Party	Janet Girsman	167	7.0	+7.0
Labour	Larry Heyman	90	3.8	−4.0
Green	Marc Scheimann	37	1.6	+1.6
Majority		265	11.2	−4.1
Turnout		2,375	48.1	−8.2
Liberal Democrats gain from Conservative		Swing		
