= 1976 St Albans City and District Council election =

1976 English local election

The 1976 St Albans City and District Council election took place on 6 May 1976 to elect members of St Albans City and District Council in England. This was on the same day as other local elections.

== Summary ==
1976 St Albans City and District Council election
Party	Seats	Gains	Losses	Net gain/loss	Seats %	Votes %	Votes	+/−
Conservative	45			▲13	83.3	60.8	69,325	+11.7
Labour	6			▼8	11.1	26.4	30,056	–4.9
Liberal	1			▼6	1.9	11.2	12,779	–6.9
Ind. Conservative	1			▲1	1.9	1.0	1,169	N/A
Independent	1			Steady	1.9	0.6	659	–0.9
