= 2000 St Albans City and District Council election =

2000 UK local government election

Map of the results of the 2000 St Albans City and District Council election. Conservatives in blue, Liberal Democrats in yellow, Labour in red and independent in light grey. Wards in dark grey were not contested in 2000.

The 2000 St Albans City and District Council election took place on 4 May 2000 to elect members of St Albans District Council in Hertfordshire, England. One third of the council was up for election and the council stayed under no overall control.

After the election, the composition of the council was:

- Liberal Democrats 23
- Conservative 19
- Labour 15
- Independent 1

== Election result ==
Overall turnout at the election was 33.56%, down from 37.1% at the 1999 election.

St Albans local election result 2000
Party	Seats	Gains	Losses	Net gain/loss	Seats %	Votes %	Votes	+/−
Conservative	8	1	3	-2	42.1	40.2	13,205	+5.7%
Liberal Democrats	5	3	1	+2	26.3	32.7	10,715	-2.1%
Labour	5	0	1	-1	26.3	23.9	7,838	-6.6%
Independent	1	1	0	+1	5.3	3.1	1,013	+2.9%
Natural Law	0	0	0	0	0	0.1	37	+0.1%

== Ward results ==
Ashley
Party	Candidate	Votes	%	±%
Labour	Edward Hill	714	48.3	−6.8
Liberal Democrats	Moira Seton	400	27.1	+1.2
Conservative	Peter White	363	24.6	+7.9
Majority		314	21.2	
Turnout		1,477	28.2	−16.5
Labour hold		Swing		

Batchwood
Party	Candidate	Votes	%	±%
Labour	Andrew Rose	834	60.5	−0.4
Conservative	Margaret Brownlie	368	26.7	+10.2
Liberal Democrats	Carol Prowse	176	12.8	−4.6
Majority		466	33.9	
Turnout		1,378	27.7	−5.1
Labour hold		Swing		

Clarence
Party	Candidate	Votes	%	±%
Liberal Democrats	John Wright	790	47.3	−2.1
Labour	Dawn Pratley	478	28.6	−1.8
Conservative	James Vessey	403	24.1	+7.4
Majority		312	18.7	
Turnout		1,671	35.3	
Liberal Democrats hold		Swing		

Cunningham
Party	Candidate	Votes	%	±%
Liberal Democrats	Geoffrey Harrison	813	43.0	+3.4
Labour	Andrew Gilson	693	36.7	−4.3
Conservative	Diana Hall	383	20.3	+3.8
Majority		120	6.3	
Turnout		1,889	39.4	−5.6
Liberal Democrats gain from Labour		Swing		

Harpenden East
Party	Candidate	Votes	%	±%
Liberal Democrats	Brian Peyton	974	45.6	+7.0
Conservative	Michael Clark	847	39.7	+1.0
Labour	David Crew	277	13.0	−9.8
Natural Law	Patricia Saunders	37	1.7	N/A
Majority		127	5.9	
Turnout		2,135	40.1	+2.0
Liberal Democrats gain from Conservative		Swing		

Harpenden North
Party	Candidate	Votes	%	±%
Conservative	John Chambers	901	55.3	+12.0
Liberal Democrats	Valerie Goodyear	565	34.7	−3.9
Labour	Richard Botterill	164	10.1	−2.7
Majority		336	20.6	
Turnout		1,630	31.0	−3.9
Conservative hold		Swing		

Harpenden South
Party	Candidate	Votes	%	±%
Conservative	Martin Treasure	1,092	65.9	+9.1
Liberal Democrats	Christopher Canfield	325	19.6	−3.6
Labour	Linda Spiri	239	14.4	−4.1
Majority		767	46.3	
Turnout		1,656	31.4	−4.8
Conservative hold		Swing		

Harpenden West
Party	Candidate	Votes	%	±%
Conservative	John Newman	1,155	67.1	+6.8
Liberal Democrats	Paul Spinks	323	18.8	−2.3
Labour	Richard Ough	244	14.2	−2.1
Majority		832	48.3	
Turnout		1,722	30.3	−3.7
Conservative hold		Swing		

London Colney
Party	Candidate	Votes	%	±%
Labour	Sean Flynn	816	59.0	−7.0
Conservative	Derek Caroline	358	25.9	+8.1
Liberal Democrats	Robert Prowse	208	15.1	+4.9
Majority		458	33.1	
Turnout		1,382	23.6	−2.8
Labour hold		Swing		

Marshalswick North
Party	Candidate	Votes	%	±%
Liberal Democrats	Jennifer Stroud	878	47.1	+7.0
Conservative	John Foster	706	37.9	+3.0
Labour	John Baughan	281	15.1	−4.8
Majority		172	9.2	
Turnout		1,865	37.1	−2.7
Liberal Democrats hold		Swing		

Marshalswick South
Party	Candidate	Votes	%	±%
Conservative	Michael Bretherton	880	42.3	+10.5
Liberal Democrats	Joy Winder	858	41.3	+2.1
Labour	Janet Smith	341	16.4	−4.6
Majority		22	1.0	
Turnout		2,079	40.4	−1.8
Conservative gain from Liberal Democrats		Swing		

Park Street
Party	Candidate	Votes	%	±%
Conservative	Michael Jameson	749	43.5	+5.8
Liberal Democrats	James Finley	651	37.8	+1.4
Labour	Donald Williamson	323	18.7	−4.9
Majority		98	5.7	
Turnout		1,723	32.1	−0.6
Conservative hold		Swing		

Redbourn (2 seats)
Party	Candidate	Votes	%	±%
Independent	Anthony Swendell	1,013	52.8	N/A
Liberal Democrats	Christopher O'Donovan	824	42.9	+7.7
Conservative	Brian Chapman	796	41.5	±0.0
Conservative	Paul Finigan	576	30.0	−6.3
Labour	Vivienne Windle	201	10.5	−5.4
Labour	John Paton	141	7.3	−5.9
Turnout		1,919	41.4	+0.0
Independent gain from Conservative		Swing		
Liberal Democrats gain from Conservative		Swing		

Sopwell
Party	Candidate	Votes	%	±%
Labour	Sinead Coyle	763	60.4	−5.9
Conservative	Geoffrey Brown	339	26.8	+8.1
Liberal Democrats	Peter Harris	162	12.8	+0.3
Majority		424	33.6	
Turnout		1,264	24.1	−4.8
Labour hold		Swing		

St Peters
Party	Candidate	Votes	%	±%
Labour	Helen Ives-Rose	673	43.4	−8.0
Liberal Democrats	Ilyas Khan	578	37.3	+6.6
Conservative	Sheila Sanders	299	19.3	+4.4
Majority		95	6.1	
Turnout		1,550	29.8	−4.6
Labour hold		Swing		

St Stephen
Party	Candidate	Votes	%	±%
Conservative	Hazel Ward	1,009	56.2	+14.0
Liberal Democrats	Khalil Moghul	530	29.5	−8.3
Labour	Patricia Allen	255	14.2	−1.8
Majority		479	26.7	
Turnout		1,794	35.1	−3.1
Conservative hold		Swing		

Verulam
Party	Candidate	Votes	%	±%
Conservative	Clare Ellis	1,034	47.2	+6.0
Liberal Democrats	Kathleen Morris	924	42.2	+5.4
Labour	Jillian Butchart	231	10.6	−7.4
Majority		110	5.0	
Turnout		2,189	41.9	−3.9
Conservative hold		Swing		

Wheathampstead
Party	Candidate	Votes	%	±%
Conservative	Gillian Clark	947	51.1	+9.2
Liberal Democrats	Paul Edelston	736	39.7	+5.4
Labour	Michael Fletcher	170	9.2	−3.4
Majority		211	11.4	
Turnout		1,853	38.9	−5.6
Conservative hold		Swing		

== By-elections between 2000 and 2002 ==
=== Park Street ===
A by-election was held in Park Street ward on 12 October 2000 after the resignation of Liberal Democrat councillor Barry Blackwall.

Park Street by-election 12 October 2000
Party	Candidate	Votes	%	±%
Liberal Democrats		1,039	57.3	+19.5
Conservative		612	33.8	−9.7
Labour		161	8.9	−9.8
Majority		427	23.6	
Turnout		1,812	33.0	+0.9
Liberal Democrats hold		Swing		

=== Sopwell ===
Sopwell by-election 7 June 2001
Party	Candidate	Votes	%	±%
Labour		1,695	55.6	−4.8
Conservative		708	23.2	−3.6
Liberal Democrats		544	17.9	+5.1
Other		99	3.3	+3.3
Majority		987	32.4	−1.1
Turnout		3,046		
Labour hold		Swing		
