= 2012 St Albans City and District Council election =

2012 UK local government election

Map of the results of the 2012 St Albans City and District Council election. Conservatives in blue, Liberal Democrats in yellow, Labour in red, Greens in green and independent in light grey. Wards in dark grey were not contested in 2012.

The 2012 St Albans City and District Council election took place on 3 May 2012 to elect members of St Albans District Council in Hertfordshire, England. One third of the council was up for election and the council stayed under no overall control.

After the election, the composition of the council was:

- Conservative 29
- Liberal Democrats 19
- Labour 8
- Green 1
- Independent 1

== Background ==
Before the election the Conservatives were the largest party on the council with 29 of the 58 seats. The Liberal Democrats had 23 seats, Labour had 4 seats, the Green Party had 1 seat and there was 1 Independent. Since the last election in 2011 Labour had gained a seat in Batchwood from the Liberal Democrats at a by-election in January 2012.

19 seats were contested in 2012 with both the Conservative and Labour parties having a full 19 candidates, the Liberal Democrats had 18 and the Greens had 17. There were 3 independent candidates as well, the sitting independent councillor Tony Swendell in Redbourn, the former Labour group leader Maurice MacMillan in London Colney, who had left the party a few years before over the imposition of an all-women shortlist, and Conservative councillor John Chambers, who was standing in Harpenden North as an independent after having been deselected by the Conservatives. Of the 19 seats the Conservatives were defending 9, the Liberal Democrats 8 and both the Green Party and an independent were defending 1 seat.

== Election result ==
The Labour Party gained 4 seats to have 8 councillors after taking 3 seats from the Liberal Democrats and 1 seat from the Conservatives. The Conservatives remained the largest party, while the Liberal Democrats dropped to 19 seats and both the Green Party and Independent Tony Swendell held the seats they had been defending.

St Albans local election result 2012
Party	Seats	Gains	Losses	Net gain/loss	Seats %	Votes %	Votes	+/−
Conservative	8	1	1	0	42.1	37.9	14,598	-4.6
Liberal Democrats	5	0	4	-4	26.3	25.0	9,625	-4.3
Labour	4	4	0	+4	21.1	22.0	8,461	+2.4
Green	1	0	0	0	5.3	8.6	3,313	+0.3
Independent	1	0	0	0	5.3	5.6	2,164	+5.3
UKIP	0	0	0	0	0.0	0.7	274	+0.7
English Democrat	0	0	0	0	0.0	0.2	83	+0.2

== Ward results ==
Ashley
Party	Candidate	Votes	%	±%
Labour	Momotaz Rahim	768	35.8	+5.5
Liberal Democrats	Nik Alatortsev	702	32.7	+0.1
Conservative	Guy Young	431	20.1	−7.8
Green	Graham Ward	246	11.5	+2.3
Majority		66	3.1	
Turnout		2,147	38	−10
Labour gain from Liberal Democrats		Swing		

Batchwood
Party	Candidate	Votes	%	±%
Labour	Malachy Pakenham	896	48.5	+7.6
Conservative	Tim Smith	395	21.4	−5.5
Liberal Democrats	Allan Witherick	384	20.8	−3.6
Green	Naomi Love	171	9.3	+7.6
Majority		501	27.1	+13.2
Turnout		1,846	34	−17
Labour gain from Liberal Democrats		Swing		

Clarence
Party	Candidate	Votes	%	±%
Liberal Democrats	Christopher White	880	42.5	+5.2
Conservative	Joe Hames	494	23.9	−8.9
Labour	Matthew Wilson	383	18.5	−1.6
Green	Jack Easton	312	15.1	+5.3
Majority		386	18.7	+14.2
Turnout		2,069	40	−24
Liberal Democrats hold		Swing		

Cunningham
Party	Candidate	Votes	%	±%
Liberal Democrats	Geoff Harrison	735	39.5	−1.9
Conservative	Jim Vessey	394	21.2	−9.8
Labour	John Metcalf	386	20.7	−0.2
UKIP	Michael Mason	151	8.1	+8.1
Green	Greg Riener	113	6.1	−0.6
English Democrat	Alan Malin	83	4.5	+4.5
Majority		341	18.3	+7.9
Turnout		1,862	38	−12
Liberal Democrats hold		Swing		

Harpenden East
Party	Candidate	Votes	%	±%
Conservative	Rosemary Farmer	920	53.2	−0.9
Liberal Democrats	Maria Moyes	420	24.3	−0.4
Labour	Rosemary Ross	250	14.5	+1.6
Green	Lorna Hann	139	8.0	−0.2
Majority		500	28.9	−0.4
Turnout		1,729	32	−17
Conservative hold		Swing		

Harpenden North
Party	Candidate	Votes	%	±%
Conservative	Julie Bell	806	46.9	−12.5
Independent	John Chambers	434	25.2	+25.2
Labour	Linda Spiri	226	13.1	−0.7
Liberal Democrats	Gordon Burrow	170	9.9	−8.4
Green	Lucy Eggleston	84	4.9	−3.5
Majority		372	21.6	−19.5
Turnout		1,720	32	−19
Conservative hold		Swing		

Harpenden South
Party	Candidate	Votes	%	±%
Conservative	David Heritage	1,280	71.1	+3.0
Labour	Michael Gray-Higgins	215	11.9	−0.1
Liberal Democrats	Andrew Crofts	196	10.9	−3.1
Green	Pete Eggleston	110	6.1	+0.2
Majority		1,065	59.1	+4.9
Turnout		1,801	34	−18
Conservative hold		Swing		

Harpenden West
Party	Candidate	Votes	%	±%
Conservative	Michael Weaver	1,345	66.8	+3.1
Liberal Democrats	Alison Steer	280	13.9	−4.8
Labour	Geoffrey Dignum	251	12.5	+0.4
Green	Lydia El-Khouri	136	6.8	+1.3
Majority		1,065	52.9	+7.9
Turnout		2,012	35	−20
Conservative hold		Swing		

London Colney (2 seats)
Party	Candidate	Votes	%	±%
Labour	Dreda Gordon	1,162	47.1	+2.6
Conservative	Simon Calder	912	36.9	−3.4
Conservative	Dave Winstone	859	34.8	−5.5
Labour	Ian Orton	813	32.9	−11.6
Independent	Malcolm MacMillan	556	22.5	N/A
Green	Mary Warren	197	8.0	+0.6
Liberal Democrats	Vibs Nazeri	114	4.6	−3.2
Liberal Democrats	Mark Pedroz	84	3.4	−4.4
Turnout		2,469	35	−5
Labour gain from Conservative		Swing		
Conservative hold		Swing		

Marshalswick North
Party	Candidate	Votes	%	±%
Liberal Democrats	Janet Churchard	889	44.5	+3.7
Conservative	Lyn Bolton	713	35.7	−3.4
Labour	John Paton	239	12.0	−1.5
Green	Rosalind Paul	155	7.8	+1.2
Majority		176	8.8	+7.1
Turnout		1,996	40	−14
Liberal Democrats hold		Swing		

Marshalswick South
Party	Candidate	Votes	%	±%
Conservative	Heidi Allen	929	39.8	−6.8
Liberal Democrats	Melvyn Teare	651	27.9	+2.6
Labour	Iain Grant	441	18.9	+0.7
Green	Jill Mills	188	8.1	−1.8
UKIP	Philip Singleton	123	5.3	+5.3
Majority		278	11.9	−9.5
Turnout		2,332	44	−14
Conservative gain from Liberal Democrats		Swing		

Park Street
Party	Candidate	Votes	%	±%
Liberal Democrats	David Yates	945	45.7	+5.7
Conservative	Stella Nash	766	37.0	−4.0
Labour	Martin McGrath	258	12.5	−1.9
Green	Robert Barton	100	4.8	+0.2
Majority		179	8.7	
Turnout		2,069	36	−12
Liberal Democrats hold		Swing		

Redbourn
Party	Candidate	Votes	%	±%
Independent	Tony Swendell	1,174	59.5	+59.5
Conservative	Victoria Mead	624	31.6	−21.1
Labour	Richard Windle	175	8.9	−1.1
Majority		550	27.9	
Turnout		1,973	41	−12
Independent hold		Swing		

Sopwell
Party	Candidate	Votes	%	±%
Labour	Janet Smith	881	47.1	+1.9
Liberal Democrats	Roger Axworthy	481	25.7	−0.1
Conservative	Bruce Snell	324	17.3	−3.0
Green	Kate Metcalf	184	9.8	+1.1
Majority		400	21.4	+2.0
Turnout		1,870	35	−13
Labour gain from Liberal Democrats		Swing		

St Peters
Party	Candidate	Votes	%	±%
Green	Simon Grover	719	34.7	+7.1
Labour	Andrew Dixon	485	23.4	+0.1
Conservative	Paul Davies	454	21.9	−4.5
Liberal Democrats	Liz Needham	412	19.9	−5.3
Majority		234	11.3	
Turnout		2,070	36	−11
Green hold		Swing		

St Stephen
Party	Candidate	Votes	%	±%
Conservative	Brian Gibbard	1,085	57.7	+2.0
Liberal Democrats	Jay Baillie	430	22.9	−3.6
Labour	Janet Blackwell	238	12.7	+1.7
Green	Lesley Baker	127	6.8	−0.1
Majority		655	34.8	+5.6
Turnout		1,880	36	−15
Conservative hold		Swing		

Verulam
Party	Candidate	Votes	%	±%
Liberal Democrats	Fred Wartenberg	1,211	50.2	+11.7
Conservative	Panos Ifans	776	32.2	−9.6
Labour	Dominic Benson	213	8.8	−3.4
Green	Margaret Grover	213	8.8	+1.2
Majority		435	18.0	
Turnout		2,413	47	−14
Liberal Democrats hold		Swing		

Wheathampstead
Party	Candidate	Votes	%	±%
Conservative	Gill Clark	1,091	53.7	+9.2
Liberal Democrats	Jon Bareham	641	31.5	−12.2
Labour	Gavin Ross	181	8.9	+1.8
Green	Ian Troughton	119	5.9	+1.2
Majority		450	22.1	+21.3
Turnout		2,032	42	−17
Conservative hold		Swing		
