= 2023 St Albans City and District Council election =

English local election

← 2022	4 May 2023	2024 →

18 out of 56 seats to St Albans City and District Council 29 seats needed for a majority

	First party	Second party
Leader	Chris White	Brian Ellis
Party	Liberal Democrats	Conservative
Last election	50 seats, 47.9%	4 seats, 24.0%
Seats before	50	4
Seats won	15	1
Seats after	49	4
Seat change	▼1	Steady
Popular vote	20,859	11,127
Percentage	50.4%	26.8%
Swing	▲2.5%	▲2.8%
	Third party	Fourth party
Leader	Simon Grover
Party	Green	Independent
Last election	1 seat, 14.9%	1 seat, 2.5%
Seats before	1	1
Seats won	1	0
Seats after	2	1
Seat change	▲1	Steady
Popular vote	5,287	0
Percentage	12.8%	0.0%
Swing	▼2.4%	▼2.5%
- Winner of each seat at the 2023 St Albans City and District Council election
Leader before election
Chris White
Liberal Democrats
Leader after election
Chris White
Liberal Democrats

The 2023 St Albans City and District Council election took place on 4 May 2023 to elect members of St Albans City and District Council in Hertfordshire, England. This was on the same day as other local elections across England.

Eighteen members of the council were up for election.

The Liberal Democrats obtained 15 seats, the Green Party obtained 2 seats (including winning one from the Liberal Democrats in Clarence ward), and the Conservatives obtained 1 seat (in Harpenden South).

The Liberal Democrats remained in control of the council after the election, with 49 out of 56 seats being held by them.

On 5 May 2023, one day after the election, it was announced that there would be a by-election for a district councillor in St. Peters ward on 13 June 2023 due to a vacancy.

The next elections took place in May 2024.

== Summary ==
=== Election result ===
2023 St Albans City and District Council election
Party	This election			Full council			This election		
Party	Seats	Net	Seats %	Other	Total	Total %	Votes	Votes %	+/−
Liberal Democrats	15	▼1	83.3	34	49	87.5	20,859	50.4	+2.5
Conservative	1	Steady	5.6	3	4	7.1	11,127	26.8	+2.8
Green	2	▲1	11.1	0	2	3.6	5,287	12.8	–2.4
Independent	0	Steady	0.0	1	1	1.8	0	0.0	–2.5
Labour	0	Steady	0.0	0	0	0.0	4,075	9.8	–0.6
Reform UK	0	Steady	0.0	0	0	0.0	49	0.1	N/A
Communist	0	Steady	0.0	0	0	0.0	30	0.1	±0.0

== Ward results ==
The Statement of Persons Nominated, which details the candidates standing in each ward, was released by St Albans City and District Council following the close of nominations on 5 April 2023.

The Liberal Democrats, Conservatives, Labour, and the Green Party had candidates in all 18 wards. The results for each ward were as follows:

=== Batchwood ===
Batchwood
Party	Candidate	Votes	%	±%
Liberal Democrats	Jenni Murray*	1,184	56.4	+3.4
Labour	Emma Turnbull	344	16.4	–1.2
Conservative	Alexandra Clark	309	14.7	–1.6
Green	Danielle Durant-Taylor	214	10.2	–2.8
Reform UK	David Thurston	49	2.3	N/A
Majority		840	40.0	N/A
Turnout		2,100	37.6	–6.7
Registered electors		5,584		
Liberal Democrats hold		Swing	▲2.3	

=== Bernards Heath ===
Bernards Heath
Party	Candidate	Votes	%	±%
Liberal Democrats	Chris Brattle	1,419	60.7	+8.2
Conservative	Ambrose Killen	406	17.3	+1.2
Green	Rosalind Paul	276	11.8	–10.1
Labour	Jane Cloke	238	10.2	+0.8
Majority		1,013	43.4	N/A
Turnout		2,339	40.4	–6.3
Registered electors		5,796		
Liberal Democrats hold		Swing	▲3.5	

=== Clarence ===
Clarence
Party	Candidate	Votes	%	±%
Green	Matt Fisher	1,503	50.9	+18.3
Liberal Democrats	Oluwasheun Onamusi	1,055	35.8	–11.1
Conservative	Don Deepthi	198	6.7	–3.2
Labour	George Sanderson	194	6.6	–4.0
Majority		448	15.1	N/A
Turnout		2,950	48.5	–2.3
Registered electors		6,089		
Green gain from Liberal Democrats		Swing	▲14.7	

=== Cunningham ===
Cunningham
Party	Candidate	Votes	%	±%
Liberal Democrats	Keith Cotton	1,281	59.6	+0.2
Conservative	Lyn Bolton	408	19.0	+3.1
Labour	John Paton	293	13.6	+1.0
Green	Caroline Hall	168	7.8	–4.3
Majority		873	40.6	N/A
Turnout		2,150	38.0	–3.0
Registered electors		5,660		
Liberal Democrats hold		Swing	▼1.5	

=== Harpenden East ===
Harpenden East
Party	Candidate	Votes	%	±%
Liberal Democrats	Dason Canning*	1,221	58.0	+7.4
Conservative	Nigel Turnbull	570	27.1	–3.2
Labour	Neil Mulcock	172	8.2	+0.4
Green	Ian Troughton	142	6.7	–4.7
Majority		651	30.9	N/A
Turnout		2,105	37.3	–6.0
Registered electors		5,637		
Liberal Democrats hold		Swing	▲5.3	

=== Harpenden North & Rural ===
Harpenden North & Rural
Party	Candidate	Votes	%	±%
Liberal Democrats	Ayesha Rohale*	1,217	53.1	–2.5
Conservative	Alexia D'Rosario	736	32.1	+2.4
Green	Candida Whittome	171	7.5	–0.9
Labour	Ben Dearman	167	7.3	+1.0
Majority		481	21.0	N/A
Turnout		2,291	39.3	–5.5
Registered electors		5,832		
Liberal Democrats hold		Swing	▼2.5	

=== Harpenden South ===
Harpenden South
Party	Candidate	Votes	%	±%
Conservative	Teresa Heritage	1,220	52.0	+10.0
Liberal Democrats	Denise de Mattos Bowser	885	37.7	+0.1
Labour	David Crew	134	5.7	–4.2
Green	Anne McQuade	106	4.6	–6.0
Majority		335	14.3	N/A
Turnout		2,345	42.2	+1.0
Registered electors		5,558		
Conservative hold		Swing	▲5.0	

=== Harpenden West ===
Harpenden West
Party	Candidate	Votes	%	±%
Liberal Democrats	Fiona Gaskell*	1,256	45.4	+2.0
Conservative	Matt Cowley	1,189	42.9	+9.6
Green	Kyle Riley	205	7.4	–10.0
Labour	Victoria Thompson	119	4.3	–1.6
Majority		67	2.5	N/A
Turnout		2,769	45.9	–3.2
Registered electors		6,036		
Liberal Democrats hold		Swing	▼3.8	

=== Hill End ===
Hill End
Party	Candidate	Votes	%	±%
Liberal Democrats	Graeme Shaw	1,468	66.5	+10.0
Conservative	Sudha Bharadia	295	13.3	+0.6
Green	Marianne Jordan	250	11.3	+0.8
Labour	Steve Clark	197	8.9	±0.0
Majority		1,173	53.2	N/A
Turnout		2,210	39.7	–6.4
Registered electors		5,569		
Liberal Democrats hold		Swing	▲4.7	

=== London Colney ===
London Colney
Party	Candidate	Votes	%	±%
Liberal Democrats	Guy Gampell*	646	35.6	+2.2
Labour	Sam Vosper	619	34.1	+6.2
Conservative	Dave Winstone	470	25.9	–4.3
Green	Allie Park-Crowne	76	4.1	–3.9
Majority		27	1.5	N/A
Turnout		1,811	30.7	–1.2
Registered electors		5,897		
Liberal Democrats hold		Swing	▼2.0	

=== Marshalswick East & Jersey Farm ===
Marshalswick East & Jersey Farm
Party	Candidate	Votes	%	±%
Liberal Democrats	Raj Visram*	1,156	49.9	–0.7
Conservative	Frances Leonard	788	34.0	+2.3
Green	James Lomas	195	8.4	–1.3
Labour	Nick Pullinger	178	7.7	–0.3
Majority		368	15.9	N/A
Turnout		2,317	39.9	–7.9
Registered electors		5,809		
Liberal Democrats hold		Swing	▼1.5	

=== Park Street ===
Park Street
Party	Candidate	Votes	%	±%
Liberal Democrats	Nuala Webb*	1,234	54.8	+7.6
Conservative	James Cook	705	31.3	–3.2
Labour	Laurence Chester	172	7.6	–1.4
Green	Mark Park-Crowne	140	6.3	–3.1
Majority		529	23.5	N/A
Turnout		2,251	35.2	–5.9
Registered electors		6,396		
Liberal Democrats hold		Swing	▲5.5	

=== Redbourn ===
Redbourn
Party	Candidate	Votes	%	±%
Liberal Democrats	Andy Thurston	859	49.8	+18.0
Conservative	Victoria Mead	615	35.6	+12.7
Labour	Symon Vegro	156	9.0	+2.8
Green	Stephen Clough	95	5.6	–2.1
Majority		244	14.2	N/A
Turnout		1,725	40.2	–1.7
Registered electors		4,292		
Liberal Democrats hold		Swing	▲2.7	

=== Sandridge & Wheathampstead ===
Sandridge & Wheathampstead
Party	Candidate	Votes	%	±%
Liberal Democrats	Sharon Hollingsworth*	1,213	48.8	+7.7
Conservative	Gill Clark	960	38.6	+1.1
Green	Oliver Hitch	166	6.7	–6.4
Labour	James Morrell	148	6.0	–2.3
Majority		253	10.2	N/A
Turnout		2,487	41.2	–4.8
Registered electors		6,039		
Liberal Democrats hold		Swing	▲3.3	

=== Sopwell ===
Sopwell
Party	Candidate	Votes	%	±%
Liberal Democrats	Harriet Sherlock	1,144	55.5	+0.7
Labour	Iain Grant	414	20.1	–0.8
Conservative	Richard Curthoys	278	13.5	+1.4
Green	Tricia Gibbons	194	9.4	–2.8
Communist	Mark Ewington	30	1.5	–1.7
Majority		730	35.4	N/A
Turnout		2,060	37.7	–5.1
Registered electors		5,458		
Liberal Democrats hold		Swing	▲0.8	

=== St Peters ===
St Peters
Party	Candidate	Votes	%	±%
Green	Simon Grover*	1,045	46.1	+9.4
Liberal Democrats	David Partridge	760	33.4	–5.9
Conservative	Graham Leonard	251	11.0	+1.0
Labour	David Byatt	217	9.5	–4.6
Majority		285	12.7	N/A
Turnout		2,273	36.9	–2.7
Registered electors		6,164		
Green hold		Swing	▲7.7	

=== St Stephen ===
St Stephen
Party	Candidate	Votes	%	±%
Liberal Democrats	Stephen Cavinder	1,243	47.7	+3.5
Conservative	Aaron Jacob	1,079	41.4	+6.3
Labour	Janet Blackwell	156	6.0	–2.7
Green	Matthew Thomas	129	4.9	–3.2
Majority		164	6.3	N/A
Turnout		2,607	39.4	–4.8
Registered electors		6,610		
Liberal Democrats hold		Swing	▼1.4	

=== Verulam ===
Verulam
Party	Candidate	Votes	%	±%
Liberal Democrats	Julian Degg	1,618	61.4	+4.4
Conservative	Susan Devi	650	24.6	+0.5
Green	Gabriel Roberts	212	8.0	–3.4
Labour	Geoff Meade	157	6.0	–1.6
Majority		968	36.8	N/A
Turnout		2,637	46.1	–5.0
Registered electors		5,722		
Liberal Democrats hold		Swing	▲2.0	

== By-elections ==
=== St Peters ===
A by-election was held in the St Peters ward on 13 June 2023, after the resignation of Liberal Democrat councillor Danny Clare.

St Peters: 13 June 2023
Party	Candidate	Votes	%	±%
Green	Juliet Voisey	628	44.7	–1.4
Liberal Democrats	David John Patridge	537	38.2	+4.8
Conservative	Ambrose Killen	156	11.1	+0.1
Labour	David James Byatt	84	6.0	–3.5
Majority		91	6.5	–6.2
Turnout		1,412	22.8	–14.1
Registered electors		6,196		
Green gain from Liberal Democrats		Swing	▼3.1	

=== Marshalswick East & Jersey Farm ===
A second by-election was held in Marshalswick East & Jersey Farm ward on 17 August 2023 following the resignation of Liberal Democrat councillor Elissa Da Costa-Waldman.

Marshalswick East & Jersey Farm: 17 August 2023
Party	Candidate	Votes	%	±%
Liberal Democrats	Raihaanah Ahmed	774	46.0	–3.9
Conservative	Frances Leonard	661	39.3	+5.3
Green	James Lomas	102	6.1	–2.3
Labour	Nick Pullinger	82	4.9	–2.8
Independent	Samuel Posner	62	3.7	N/A
Majority		113	6.7	−9.2
Turnout		1,685	28.8	−11.1
Registered electors		5,853		
Liberal Democrats hold		Swing		

=== Sandridge and Wheathampstead ===
A third by-election was held on 7 December 2023 due to a vacancy in the Sandridge and Wheathampstead ward.

Sandridge and Wheathampstead: 7 December 2023
Party	Candidate	Votes	%	±%
Liberal Democrats	Simon Johns	793	55.6	+6.8
Conservative	Claudio Duran	480	33.7	−4.9
Green	Oliver Hitch	78	5.5	−1.2
Labour	James Morrell	68	4.8	−1.2
Majority		313	21.9	+11.7
Turnout		1,426	23.4	−18.1
Registered electors		6,093		
Liberal Democrats hold		Swing	▲13.2%	
