= 2002 St Albans City and District Council election =

2002 UK local government election

Map of the results of the 2002 St Albans City and District Council election. Conservatives in blue, Liberal Democrats in yellow and Labour in red.

The 2002 St Albans City and District Council election took place on 2 May 2002 to elect members of St Albans District Council in Hertfordshire, England. One third of the council was up for election and the council stayed under no overall control.

After the election, the composition of the council was:

- Conservative 21
- Liberal Democrats 20
- Labour 15
- Independent 1
- Vacant 1

== Background ==
Before the election the Liberal Democrats were the largest party on the council with 23 councillors, compared to 19 for the Conservatives, 15 for Labour and there was 1 independent. 7 councillors stood down at the election, Liberal Democrats John Henchley, John Peters and Brian Roberts, Conservatives Richard Blossom, Patrick Johnston and Julian Turner, and Labour's David Enright.

The Liberal Democrats targeted Labour held seats in Ashley and St Peter's, while Labour aimed to pick up a seat in Cunningham. As well as the 3 main political parties, voters could also vote for the No Candidate Deserves My Vote! party in some wards, which was standing in order to give voters the chance to register their abstention at the polls.

== Voting trial ==
A trial took place in Sopwell and Verulam wards under which voters could vote either by internet, phone, post or at the polling station using a touch screen system. The internet voting trial was funded by the Department for Transport, Local Government and the Regions as part of an attempt to get more people involved in elections. As a result of the trial one of the wards set the fastest declaration time at only 4 minutes after the close of polling. However turnout was actually down from 24.1% to 23.3% in Sopwell ward and down from 41.9% to 38.9% in Verulam ward compared to the last election in 2000.

== Election result ==
The Conservatives gained 3 seats from the Liberal Democrats in Colney Heath, Harpenden North and Sandridge to become the largest party on the council with 21 councillors. The Liberal Democrats dropped to 20 seats, but did gain an increased share of the votes, while Labour stayed on 15 seats. There also remained 1 independent councillor and one seat was vacant after the death of Verulam Conservative councillor Michael Pugh on 22 April 2002. Overall turnout at the election was 38.22%, up from 33.56% at the 2000 election.

St Albans local election result 2002
Party	Seats	Gains	Losses	Net gain/loss	Seats %	Votes %	Votes	+/−
Conservative	8	3	0	+3	38.1	35.8	13,722	-4.4%
Liberal Democrats	7	0	3	-3	33.3	38.8	14,896	+6.1%
Labour	6	0	0	0	28.6	25.1	9,632	+1.2%
No Candidate Deserves My Vote!	0	0	0	0	0	0.3	117	+0.3%

== Ward results ==
Ashley
Party	Candidate	Votes	%	±%
Labour	Malachy Pakenham	768	41.3	−7.0
Liberal Democrats	Alan Marshall	678	36.5	+9.4
Conservative	Alec Campbell	382	20.5	−4.1
No Candidate Deserves My Vote!	Rosemary Flanagan	31	1.7	+1.7
Majority		90	4.8	−16.5
Turnout		1,859		
Labour hold		Swing		

Batchwood (2 seats)
Party	Candidate	Votes	%	±%
Labour	Roma Mills	993	59.9	−0.6
Labour	Martin Leach	871	52.6	−7.5
Conservative	Margaret Brownlie	343	20.7	−6.0
Conservative	Pamela Farley	339	20.5	−6.2
Liberal Democrats	Richard Biddle	323	19.5	+6.7
Liberal Democrats	Debbie Williams	267	16.1	+3.3
Turnout		1,657		
Labour hold		Swing		
Labour hold		Swing		

Clarence
Party	Candidate	Votes	%	±%
Liberal Democrats	Joyce Lusby	1,095	59.2	+11.9
Labour	Taufiq Lodhi	423	22.9	−5.7
Conservative	Louisa-Jane Rosalki	331	17.9	−6.2
Majority		672	36.3	+17.6
Turnout		1,849		
Liberal Democrats hold		Swing		

Colney Heath
Party	Candidate	Votes	%	±%
Conservative	David Clarke	621	44.0	+18.2
Liberal Democrats	Christopher Brazier	514	36.4	−11.1
Labour	David Mclean	276	19.6	−6.2
Majority		107	7.6	
Turnout		1,411		
Conservative gain from Liberal Democrats		Swing		

Cunningham
Party	Candidate	Votes	%	±%
Liberal Democrats	Robert Prowse	842	43.3	+0.3
Labour	Andrew Gilson	699	36.0	−0.7
Conservative	Diana Hall	402	20.7	+0.4
Majority		143	7.3	+0.9
Turnout		1,943		
Liberal Democrats hold		Swing		

Harpenden East
Party	Candidate	Votes	%	±%
Liberal Democrats	Alison Steer	1,013	46.7	+1.1
Conservative	Victor Holley	830	38.3	−1.4
Labour	David Crew	324	15.0	+2.0
Majority		183	8.4	+2.5
Turnout		2,167		
Liberal Democrats hold		Swing		

Harpenden North
Party	Candidate	Votes	%	±%
Conservative	Richard Grenfell-Hill	935	47.9	−7.4
Liberal Democrats	John Coad	812	41.6	+6.9
Labour	Rosemary Ross	206	10.5	+0.4
Majority		123	6.3	−14.3
Turnout		1,953		
Conservative gain from Liberal Democrats		Swing		

Harpenden South
Party	Candidate	Votes	%	±%
Conservative	Teresa Heritage	1,254	63.4	−2.5
Liberal Democrats	Christopher Canfield	461	23.3	+3.7
Labour	David Lawlor	263	13.3	−1.1
Majority		793	40.1	−5.2
Turnout		1,978		
Conservative hold		Swing		

Harpenden West
Party	Candidate	Votes	%	±%
Conservative	Robert Wicks	1,211	60.1	−7.0
Liberal Democrats	Nigel Jenkinson	505	25.1	+6.3
Labour	Benjamin Dearman	299	14.8	+0.6
Majority		706	35.0	−13.3
Turnout		2,015		
Conservative hold		Swing		

London Colney
Party	Candidate	Votes	%	±%
Labour	Etheldreda Gordon	1,075	61.9	+2.9
Conservative	Geoffrey Brooking	409	23.5	−2.4
Liberal Democrats	Carol Prowse	253	14.6	−0.5
Majority		666	38.4	+5.3
Turnout		1,737		
Labour hold		Swing		

Marshalswick North
Party	Candidate	Votes	%	±%
Liberal Democrats	Thomas Clegg	942	47.5	+0.4
Conservative	John Foster	724	36.5	−1.4
Labour	John Baughan	319	16.1	+1.0
Majority		218	11.0	+1.8
Turnout		1,985		
Liberal Democrats hold		Swing		

Marshalswick South
Party	Candidate	Votes	%	±%
Liberal Democrats	Michael Ketley	1,353	57.8	+16.5
Conservative	Roderick Douglas	667	28.5	−13.8
Labour	Janet Smith	321	13.7	−2.7
Majority		686	29.3	
Turnout		2,341		
Liberal Democrats hold		Swing		

Park Street
Party	Candidate	Votes	%	±%
Liberal Democrats	Aislinn Lee	1,276	65.5	+27.7
Conservative	James Vessey	418	21.5	−22.0
Labour	Janet Blackwell	253	13.0	−5.7
Majority		858	44.0	
Turnout		1,947		
Liberal Democrats hold		Swing		

Redbourn
Party	Candidate	Votes	%	±%
Liberal Democrats	Patricia Schofield	997	52.3	+9.4
Conservative	Paul Finigan	753	39.5	+9.5
Labour	Clive Newport	158	8.3	−2.2
Majority		244	12.8	
Turnout		1,908		
Liberal Democrats hold		Swing		

Sandridge
Party	Candidate	Votes	%	±%
Conservative	Beric Read	548	41.3	+5.7
Liberal Democrats	William Morris	531	40.0	+2.1
Labour	Christine Dawson	226	17.0	−0.5
No Candidate Deserves My Vote!	Cliff Miller	21	1.6	N/A
Majority		17	1.3	
Turnout		1,326		
Conservative gain from Liberal Democrats		Swing		

Sopwell
Party	Candidate	Votes	%	±%
Labour	Dawn Pratley	664	58.3	−2.1
Conservative	Marilyn Madden	242	21.3	−5.5
Liberal Democrats	Moira Seton	196	17.2	+4.4
No Candidate Deserves My Vote!	Michael Horan	36	3.2	+3.2
Majority		422	37.0	+3.5
Turnout		1,138	23.3	−0.8
Labour hold		Swing		

St Peters
Party	Candidate	Votes	%	±%
Labour	Winifred Dunleavy	783	43.7	+0.3
Liberal Democrats	Ilyas Khan	684	38.1	+0.8
Conservative	Virginia Walker	326	18.2	−1.1
Majority		99	5.6	−0.5
Turnout		1,793		
Labour hold		Swing		

St Stephen
Party	Candidate	Votes	%	±%
Conservative	Susan Carr	1,086	55.3	−0.9
Liberal Democrats	Jadwiga Baillie	584	29.7	+0.2
Labour	Patricia Allen	295	15.0	+0.8
Majority		502	25.6	−1.1
Turnout		1,965		
Conservative hold		Swing		

Verulam
Party	Candidate	Votes	%	±%
Conservative	Pauline Buffham	934	48.7	+1.5
Liberal Democrats	Martin Frearson	711	37.1	−5.1
Labour	Linda Spiri	243	12.7	+2.1
No Candidate Deserves My Vote!	Peter Goodall	29	1.5	+1.5
Majority		223	11.6	+6.6
Turnout		1,917	38.9	−3.0
Conservative hold		Swing		

Wheathampstead
Party	Candidate	Votes	%	±%
Conservative	Keith Stammers	967	48.4	−2.7
Liberal Democrats	Paul Edelston	859	43.0	+3.3
Labour	Mary Cheale	173	8.7	−0.5
Majority		108	5.4	−6.0
Turnout		1,999		
Conservative hold		Swing		

== By-elections between 2002 and 2003 ==
A by-election was held in Verulam ward on 27 June 2002 after the death of Conservative councillor Michael Pugh. The seat was gained for the Liberal Democrats by Martin Frearson with a majority of 24 votes over the Conservatives, after Frearson had come second to the Conservatives in the seat at the council election in May.

Turnout increased by 2% from the May council election and the number of spoiled ballots dropped to 2 from 30 at the May election when the trial of electronic voting had taken place in the ward.

Verulam by-election 27 June 2002
Party	Candidate	Votes	%	±%
Liberal Democrats	Martin Frearson	960	46.6	+9.5
Conservative	Marilyn Madden	936	45.5	−3.2
Labour	Linda Spiri	145	7.0	−5.7
No Candidate Deserves My Vote	Peter Goodall	17	0.8	−0.7
Majority		24	1.1	
Turnout		2,058	40.9	
Liberal Democrats gain from Conservative		Swing		
