= 2011 St Albans City and District Council election =

2011 UK local government election

Map of the results of the 2011 St Albans City and District Council election. Conservatives in blue, Liberal Democrats in yellow, Labour in red and Greens in green.

The 2011 St Albans City and District Council election took place on 5 May 2011 to elect members of St Albans District Council in Hertfordshire, England. One third of the council was up for election and the Liberal Democrats lost overall control of the council to no overall control.

After the election, the composition of the council was:

- Conservative 29
- Liberal Democrats 24
- Labour 3
- Green 1
- Independent 1

== Election result ==
The Liberal Democrats lost control of the council as the Conservatives came up 1 seat short of taking a majority themselves, after the Conservatives gained 5 seats from the Liberal Democrats. The Conservative gains took them to 29 of the 58 seats on the council, while the Liberal Democrats dropped to 24 seats. Meanwhile, the Green Party gained their first councillor on the council after taking 1 of the 2 seats that were contested in St Peters ward.

Following the election Conservative Julian Daly became the new leader of the council at the head of a minority administration.

St Albans local election result 2011
Party	Seats	Gains	Losses	Net gain/loss	Seats %	Votes %	Votes	+/−
Conservative	12	5	0	+5	57.1	42.5	23,628	+0.5%
Liberal Democrats	5	0	6	-6	23.8	29.3	16,290	-8.9%
Labour	3	0	0	0	14.3	19.6	10,891	+5.5%
Green	1	1	0	+1	4.8	8.3	4,607	+3.6%
Independent	0	0	0	0	0	0.3	168	+0.3%

== Ward results ==
Ashley
Party	Candidate	Votes	%	±%
Liberal Democrats	Iqbal Zia	867	32.6	−16.6
Labour	Iain Grant	806	30.3	+12.8
Conservative	Chris Baker	741	27.9	+0.5
Green	Graham Ward	245	9.2	+3.2
Majority		61	2.3	−19.5
Turnout		2,659	48	−25
Liberal Democrats hold		Swing		

Batchwood
Party	Candidate	Votes	%	±%
Labour	Martin Leach	1,128	40.9	+8.4
Conservative	Oliver Dowden	743	26.9	−3.5
Liberal Democrats	David Partridge	675	24.4	−8.1
Independent	Gerry Foster	168	6.1	+6.1
Green	Naomi Love	47	1.7	−2.9
Majority		385	14.0	
Turnout		2,761	51	−21
Labour hold		Swing		

Clarence
Party	Candidate	Votes	%	±%
Liberal Democrats	Sheila Burton	1,021	37.3	−10.6
Conservative	Michael Rock	899	32.8	+3.3
Labour	Andrew Dixon	551	20.1	+5.4
Green	Jack Easton	267	9.8	+1.9
Majority		122	4.5	−13.8
Turnout		2,738	64	−12
Liberal Democrats hold		Swing		

Colney Heath
Party	Candidate	Votes	%	±%
Liberal Democrats	Chris Brazier	1,191	59.8	+9.8
Conservative	Jonathan Marks	467	23.5	−13.2
Labour	Jane Hobday	234	11.8	+2.2
Green	Robert Barton	98	4.9	+1.2
Majority		724	36.4	+23.0
Turnout		1,990	48	−26
Liberal Democrats hold		Swing		

Cunningham
Party	Candidate	Votes	%	±%
Liberal Democrats	Robert Donald	990	41.4	−4.3
Conservative	Jim Vessey	741	31.0	+0.6
Labour	John Paton	500	20.9	+1.8
Green	Greg Riener	159	6.7	+1.9
Majority		249	10.4	−4.9
Turnout		2,390	50	−21
Liberal Democrats hold		Swing		

Harpenden East
Party	Candidate	Votes	%	±%
Conservative	Mike Wakely	1,445	54.1	+6.5
Liberal Democrats	Andy Upton	661	24.7	−17.8
Labour	Vivienne Windle	346	12.9	+6.0
Green	Lorna Hann	220	8.2	+5.2
Majority		784	29.3	+24.2
Turnout		2,672	49	−26
Conservative hold		Swing		

Harpenden North
Party	Candidate	Votes	%	±%
Conservative	Bert Pawle	1,591	59.4	+4.4
Liberal Democrats	Gordon Burrow	491	18.3	−11.8
Labour	Rosemary Ross	369	13.8	+3.1
Green	Annett Tate	226	8.4	+4.2
Majority		1,100	41.1	+16.2
Turnout		2,677	51	−25
Conservative hold		Swing		

Harpenden South
Party	Candidate	Votes	%	±%
Conservative	Brian Ellis	1,893	68.1	+2.8
Liberal Democrats	Maria Moyses	388	14.0	−8.0
Labour	Linda Spiri	332	12.0	+3.8
Green	Tony Grover	165	5.9	+1.4
Majority		1,505	54.2	+11.0
Turnout		2,778	52	−26
Conservative hold		Swing		

Harpenden West
Party	Candidate	Votes	%	±%
Conservative	Daniel Chichester-Miles	1,992	63.7	+4.7
Liberal Democrats	Alison Steer	585	18.7	−8.8
Labour	David Lawlor	379	12.1	+2.3
Green	Lydia El-Khouri	172	5.5	+1.8
Majority		1,407	45.0	+13.4
Turnout		3,128	55	−22
Conservative hold		Swing		

London Colney
Party	Candidate	Votes	%	±%
Labour	Jacob Quagliozzi	1,220	44.5	+11.7
Conservative	Simon Calder	1,105	40.3	+2.1
Liberal Democrats	Vibs Nazeri	215	7.8	−13.5
Green	Mary Warren	203	7.4	+5.2
Majority		115	4.2	
Turnout		2,743	40	−28
Labour hold		Swing		

Marshalswick North
Party	Candidate	Votes	%	±%
Liberal Democrats	Geoff Churchard	1,076	40.8	−7.0
Conservative	John Foster	1,031	39.1	+0.4
Labour	Richard Harris	355	13.5	+3.8
Green	Rosalind Paul	173	6.6	+2.9
Majority		45	1.7	−7.4
Turnout		2,635	54	−23
Liberal Democrats hold		Swing		

Marshalswick South
Party	Candidate	Votes	%	±%
Conservative	M. Salih Gaygusuz	1,433	46.6	+6.9
Liberal Democrats	Heather Teare	776	25.3	−15.1
Labour	Ruairi McCourt	560	18.2	+4.1
Green	Jill Mills	303	9.9	+4.1
Majority		657	21.3	
Turnout		3,072	58	−21
Conservative gain from Liberal Democrats		Swing		

Park Street
Party	Candidate	Votes	%	±%
Conservative	Steve Bowes-Phipps	1,105	41.0	+4.6
Liberal Democrats	Nicola McAlister-Baillie	1,078	40.0	−6.4
Labour	Janet Smith	389	14.4	+5.2
Green	Miriam Vincken	125	4.6	+2.5
Majority		27	1.0	
Turnout		2,697	48	−26
Conservative gain from Liberal Democrats		Swing		

Redbourn
Party	Candidate	Votes	%	±%
Conservative	Maxine Crawley	1,334	52.7	+3.5
Liberal Democrats	Colin O'Donovan	791	31.2	−8.7
Labour	Gavin Ross	252	10.0	+3.2
Green	Tom Hardy	155	6.1	+2.0
Majority		543	21.4	+12.2
Turnout		2,532	53	−23
Conservative hold		Swing		

Sandridge
Party	Candidate	Votes	%	±%
Conservative	Frances Leonard	1,087	55.8	+3.5
Liberal Democrats	Sheila Clegg	397	20.4	−11.6
Labour	Jane Cloke	307	15.8	+4.7
Green	Ian Troughton	158	8.1	+3.5
Majority		690	35.4	+15.2
Turnout		1,949	51	−26
Conservative hold		Swing		

Sopwell
Party	Candidate	Votes	%	±%
Labour	Eileen Harris	1,133	45.2	+16.5
Liberal Democrats	Catherine Barron	647	25.8	−14.6
Conservative	Bruce Snell	510	20.3	−4.6
Green	Kate Metcalf	217	8.7	+2.8
Majority		486	19.4	
Turnout		2,507	48	−21
Labour hold		Swing		

St Peters (2 seats)
Party	Candidate	Votes	%	±%
Conservative	Alec Campbell	795	29.2	−0.2
Green	Simon Grover	751	27.6	+14.4
Conservative	Paul Davies	718	26.4	−3.0
Liberal Democrats	Liz Needham	684	25.2	−16.8
Liberal Democrats	Jack Pia	652	24.0	−18.0
Labour	John Baker	634	23.3	+7.8
Labour	John Metcalf	533	19.6	+4.1
Green	Daniel Jordan	376	13.8	+0.6
Turnout		2,718	47	−25
Conservative gain from Liberal Democrats		Swing		
Green gain from Liberal Democrats		Swing		

St Stephen
Party	Candidate	Votes	%	±%
Conservative	Gordon Myland	1,467	55.7	+0.2
Liberal Democrats	Dick Downs	698	26.5	−5.3
Labour	Alex Breed	290	11.0	+1.2
Green	Lesley Baker	181	6.9	+4.0
Majority		769	29.2	+5.4
Turnout		2,636	51	−27
Conservative hold		Swing		

Verulam
Party	Candidate	Votes	%	±%
Conservative	Dursun Altun	1,289	41.8	−0.3
Liberal Democrats	Martin Frearson	1,187	38.5	−1.5
Labour	Miriam Foster	375	12.2	+3.2
Green	Margaret Grover	235	7.6	+2.9
Majority		102	3.3	+1.2
Turnout		3,086	61	−21
Conservative gain from Liberal Democrats		Swing		

Wheathampstead
Party	Candidate	Votes	%	±%
Conservative	Nigel Huddleston	1,242	44.5	−4.0
Liberal Democrats	Chris Oxley	1,220	43.7	+0.5
Labour	Peter Woodhams	198	7.1	+2.7
Green	Gillian Patrick	131	4.7	+1.8
Majority		22	0.8	−5.6
Turnout		2,791	59	−19
Conservative gain from Liberal Democrats		Swing		

== By-elections between 2011 and 2012 ==
A by-election was held in Batchwood ward on 19 January 2012 after Liberal Democrat councillor Amanda Archer resigned from the council. The seat was gained for Labour by their former group leader Roma Mills with a majority of 607 votes over the Liberal Democrats.

Batchwood by-election 19 January 2012
Party	Candidate	Votes	%	±%
Labour	Roma Mills	1,002	55.1	+14.2
Liberal Democrats	David Partridge	395	21.7	−2.7
Conservative	Tim Smith	347	19.1	−7.8
Green	Naomi Love	76	4.2	+2.5
Majority		607	33.4	+19.5
Turnout		1,820	33.2	−18
Labour gain from Liberal Democrats		Swing		
