= 2024 St Albans City and District Council election =

English local election

- 2 May 2024

21 out of 56 seats to St Albans City and District Council 29 seats needed for a majority
- Registered: 104,563
- Turnout: 43.5%

	First party	Second party	Third party
Leader	Chris White	Brian Ellis	Simon Grover
Party	Liberal Democrats	Conservative	Green
Last election	49 seats, 50.4%	4 seats, 26.8%	2 seat, 12.8%
Seats before	45	4	3
Seats after	47	3	3
Seat change	▼2	▼1	▲1
Popular vote	22,472	9,596	6,591
Percentage	49.7%	21.3%	14.6%
Swing	▼0.7%	▼5.5%	▲1.8%
	Fourth party	Fifth party
Party	Labour	Independent
Last election	0 seat, 9.8%	1 seat, 0%
Seats before	0	1
Seats after	2	1
Seat change	▲2	Steady
Popular vote	5,443	279
Percentage	12.0%	0.6%
Swing	▲2.2%	▲0.6%
- Winner of each seat at the 2024 St Albans City and District Council election
Leader before election
Chris White
Liberal Democrats
Leader after election
Paul De Kort
Liberal Democrats

The 2024 St Albans City and District Council election took place on 2 May 2024 to elect members of St Albans City and District Council in Hertfordshire, England. This was on the same day as other local elections across England.

There were 21 members of the council up for election, being the usual approximate third of the council plus three by-elections. The council remained under Liberal Democrat majority control.

== Summary ==
Prior to the election, the council was under Liberal Democrat majority control. The leader of the council, Chris White, did not stand for re-election in 2024.

Following the election, the Liberal Democrats retained their majority. They chose Paul De Kort to be their new group leader, who was formally appointed as the new leader of the council at the subsequent annual council meeting on 22 May 2024.

=== Election result ===
2024 St Albans City and District Council election
Party	This election			Full council			This election		
Party	Seats	Net	Seats %	Other	Total	Total %	Votes	Votes %	+/−
Liberal Democrats	17	▼2	80.9	30	47	83.9	22,472	49.7	–0.7
Conservative	1	▼1	4.8	2	3	5.4	9,596	21.3	–5.5
Green	1	▲1	4.8	2	3	5.4	6,591	14.6	+1.8
Labour	2	▲2	9.5	0	2	3.6	5,443	12.0	+2.2
Reform	0	Steady	0.0	0	0	0.0	776	1.7	+1.6
Independent	0	Steady	0.0	1	1	1.8	279	0.6	+0.6
Communist	0	Steady	0.0	0	0	0.0	17	0.1	±0.0

== Ward results ==
The Statement of Persons Nominated, which details the candidates standing in each ward, was released by St Albans City and District Council following the close of nominations on 5 April 2024.

=== Batchwood ===
Batchwood (2 seats due to by-election)
Party	Candidate	Votes	%	±%
Liberal Democrats	Lynn Cunningham	1,015	43.7	−12.7
Liberal Democrats	Sinéad Howland	970	41.8	−14.6
Green	Damian Gaskin	928	40.0	+29.8
Green	Matthew Thomas	432	18.6	+8.4
Conservative	Joshua Varghese	256	11.0	−3.7
Labour	Mal Pakenham	255	11.0	−5.4
Labour	Janet Smith	240	10.3	−6.1
Independent	Gerry Foster	85	3.7	N/A
Majority				
Turnout		2,322	41.19	
Registered electors		5,637		
Liberal Democrats hold		Swing		
Liberal Democrats hold		Swing		

=== Bernards Heath ===
Bernards Heath
Party	Candidate	Votes	%	±%
Liberal Democrats	Jez Levy	1,257	55.8	–4.9
Conservative	John Page	305	13.5	–3.8
Green	Gabriel Roberts	267	11.9	+0.1
Labour	Jane Cloke	229	10.1	+0.1
Independent	Gee Smedley	194	8.6	N/A
Majority		952	42.3	–1.1
Turnout		2,252	38.4	–2.0
Registered electors		5,892		
Liberal Democrats hold		Swing		

=== Clarence ===
Clarence
Party	Candidate	Votes	%	±%
Liberal Democrats	Joanna Meaden	1,347	46.6	+10.8
Green	Lucy Swift	1,211	42.0	–8.9
Conservative	Lyn Bolton	166	5.7	–1.0
Labour	Martin Mcgrath	164	5.7	–0.9
Majority		136	4.6	
Turnout		2,888	47.3	–1.2
Registered electors		6,134		
Liberal Democrats hold		Swing		

=== Cunningham ===
Cunningham
Party	Candidate	Votes	%	±%
Liberal Democrats	Roly Everall	1,189	56.7	–2.9
Conservative	Jordan Sweeny	284	13.5	–5.5
Labour	John Paton	281	13.4	–0.2
Green	Caroline Hall	220	10.5	+2.7
Reform	Larraine Charters	123	5.7	N/A
Majority		905	43.2	+2.6
Turnout		2,097	37.1	–0.9
Registered electors		5,677		
Liberal Democrats hold		Swing		

=== Harpenden East ===
Harpenden East
Party	Candidate	Votes	%	±%
Liberal Democrats	Paul de Kort	1,081	54.4	–3.6
Conservative	Mitchell Kieran	539	27.1	±0.0
Labour	Neil Mulcock	197	9.9	+1.7
Green	Louise Schlich	170	8.6	+1.9
Majority		542	27.3	–3.6
Turnout		1,987	34.9	–2.4
Registered electors		5,716		
Liberal Democrats hold		Swing		

=== Harpenden North & Rural ===
Harpenden North & Rural
Party	Candidate	Votes	%	±%
Liberal Democrats	Beth Fisher	1,161	53.7	+0.6
Conservative	Samuel Spiri	662	30.6	–1.5
Labour	Ross Harper	186	8.7	+1.4
Green	Mario May	152	7.0	–0.5
Majority		499	23.1	–2.1
Turnout		2,161	36.6	–2.7
Registered electors		5,921		
Liberal Democrats hold		Swing		

=== Harpenden South ===
Harpenden South
Party	Candidate	Votes	%	±%
Conservative	Matt Cowley	1,097	46.2	–5.8
Liberal Democrats	Denise Bowser	1,039	43.7	+6.0
Labour	James Morrell	146	6.1	+0.4
Green	Gordon Baisley	94	4.0	–0.6
Majority		58	2.5	–11.8
Turnout		2,376	42.9	+0.7
Registered electors		5,572		
Conservative hold		Swing		

=== Harpenden West ===
Harpenden West
Party	Candidate	Votes	%	±%
Liberal Democrats	John Galvin	1,327	49.1	+3.7
Conservative	Clark Alex	1,027	38.0	–4.9
Labour	Victoria Thompson	220	8.1	+3.8
Green	Kyle Riley	131	4.8	–2.6
Majority		300	11.1	+8.6
Turnout		2,705	44.5	–1.4
Registered electors		6,108		
Liberal Democrats hold		Swing		

=== London Colney ===
London Colney (2 seats due to by-election)
Party	Candidate	Votes	%	±%
Labour	Hobday Mike	835	46.7	+12.6
Labour	Emma Turnbull	684	36.2	+2.1
Liberal Democrats	Karl Mugele	487	27.2	−8.4
Conservative	Simon Calder	463	25.9	±0.0
Liberal Democrats	David Onamusi	433	24.2	−11.4
Conservative	Ambrose Killen	268	15.0	−10.9
Reform	Eleanor Jackson	164	9.2	N/A
Green	Matt Maddock	160	8.9	+4.8
Green	Rosalind Paul	85	4.7	+0.6
Turnout		3,579	33.21	+2.51
Registered electors		5,857		
Labour gain from Conservative		Swing		
Labour gain from Liberal Democrats		Swing		

=== Hill End ===
Hill End
Party	Candidate	Votes	%	±%
Liberal Democrats	Anthony Rowlands	1,584	70.5	+4.0
Conservative	Sudha Bharadia	256	11.4	–1.9
Green	Marianne Jordan	223	9.9	–1.4
Labour	Steven Clark	185	8.2	–0.7
Majority		1,328	59.1	+5.9
Turnout		2,248	40.2	+0.5
Registered electors		5,623		
Liberal Democrats hold		Swing		

=== Marshalswick East & Jersey Farm ===
Marshalswick East & Jersey Farm
Party	Candidate	Votes	%	±%
Liberal Democrats	Ahmed Raihaanah	1,069	46.7	–3.2
Conservative	Frances Leonard	855	37.3	+3.3
Green	James Lomas	187	8.2	–0.2
Labour	Nick Pullinger	178	7.8	+0.1
Majority		214	9.4	–6.5
Turnout		2,289	40.4	+0.5
Registered electors		5,932		
Liberal Democrats hold		Swing		

=== Marshalswick West ===
Marshalswick West
Party	Candidate	Votes	%	±%
Liberal Democrats	Simon Mostyn	1,035	63.0	+5.3
Conservative	Don Deepthi	342	20.8	−4.4
Green	Rachel Timbs	158	9.6	+1.1
Labour	Sarah Heiser	108	6.6	−0.4
Majority		693	42.2	
Turnout		1,643	42.8	
Registered electors		3,856		
Liberal Democrats hold		Swing		

=== Park Street ===
Park Street
Party	Candidate	Votes	%	±%
Liberal Democrats	Smith Terrie	1,087	50.7	–4.1
Conservative	Richard Curthoys	519	24.2	–7.1
Reform	Roger Gray	201	9.4	N/A
Labour	Laurence Chester	178	8.3	+0.7
Green	Mark Park-Crowne	159	7.4	+1.1
Majority		568	26.5	+3.0
Turnout		2,144	33.0	–2.2
Registered electors		6,532		
Liberal Democrats hold		Swing		

=== Sandridge & Wheathampstead ===
Sandridge & Wheathampstead (2 seats due to by-election)
Party	Candidate	Votes	%	±%
Liberal Democrats	Owain McKenzie	1,003	46.0	−2.8
Liberal Democrats	Simon Johns	990	45.8	−3.0
Conservative	Claudio Duran	743	34.4	−4.2
Labour	Hannah Thornley Hill	349	16.2	+10.2
Green	Danielle Durant-Taylor	277	12.8	+6.1
Green	Oliver Hitch	217	10.0	+3.3
Majority				
Turnout		2,160	35.32	
Registered electors		6,115		
Liberal Democrats hold		Swing		
Liberal Democrats hold		Swing		

=== Sopwell ===
Sopwell
Party	Candidate	Votes	%	±%
Liberal Democrats	Jesús Pastor	968	50.5	–5.0
Labour	Iain Grant	376	19.6	–0.5
Green	Deborah McGettrick	226	11.9	+2.5
Conservative	Heather Rench	203	10.6	–2.9
Reform	Lexine Savva	125	6.5	N/A
Communist	Mark Ewington	17	0.9	–0.6
Majority		592	30.9	–4.5
Turnout		1,915	35.5	–2.2
Registered electors		5,419		
Liberal Democrats hold		Swing		

=== St Peters ===
St Peters
Party	Candidate	Votes	%	±%
Green	Juliet Voisey	918	43.9	–2.2
Liberal Democrats	Naina Bloom	758	36.2	+2.8
Labour	David Byatt	225	10.8	+1.3
Conservative	Graham Leonard	190	9.1	–1.9
Majority		160	7.7	–5.0
Turnout		2,091	34.2	–2.7
Registered electors		6,136		
Green gain from Liberal Democrats		Swing		

=== St Stephen ===
St Stephen
Party	Candidate	Votes	%	±%
Liberal Democrats	Giles Fry	1,066	43.3	–4.4
Conservative	James Cook	866	35.3	–6.1
Labour	Janet Blackwell	216	8.8	+2.8
Reform	David Thurston	163	6.6	N/A
Green	Meryl Burleigh	145	6.0	+1.1
Majority		200	8.0	+1.7
Turnout		2,456	36.8	–2.6
Registered electors		6,690		
Liberal Democrats hold		Swing		

=== Verulam ===
Verulam
Party	Candidate	Votes	%	±%
Liberal Democrats	Edgar Hill	1,606	62.2	+0.8
Conservative	June Reid	555	21.5	–3.1
Green	Candy Whittome	231	8.9	+0.9
Labour	Geoff Meade	191	7.4	+1.4
Majority		1,051	40.7	+3.9
Turnout		2,583	45.3	–0.8
Registered electors		5,746		
Liberal Democrats hold		Swing		

== By-elections ==
=== Harpenden North & Rural ===
A by-election was held in the Harpenden North and Rural ward on 17 October 2024, after the resignation of Liberal Democrat councillor Beth Fisher.

Harpenden North and Rural: 17 October 2024
Party	Candidate	Votes	%	±%
Conservative	Sue Griffiths	661	49.3	+18.7
Liberal Democrats	James Robertson	546	40.7	−13.0
Green	Mario May	82	6.1	−0.9
Labour	Ross Harper	51	3.8	−4.9
Majority		115	8.6	
Turnout		1,340		
Conservative gain from Liberal Democrats		Swing		

=== Redbourn ===
Redbourn by-election: 1 May 2025
Party	Candidate	Votes	%	±%
Liberal Democrats	Brian Gunson	507	31.1	–18.7
Independent	Tom Finnis	362	22.2	N/A
Conservative	Victoria Mead	356	21.8	–13.8
Reform	Philip Wells	270	16.5	N/A
Labour	Symon Vegro	94	5.8	–3.2
Green	Kevin Tiplady	43	2.6	–3.0
Majority		145	8.9	–5.3
Turnout		1,639	37.9	–2.3
Registered electors		4,329		
Liberal Democrats hold				
