= 1999 St Albans City and District Council election =

1999 UK local government election

Map of the results of the 1999 St Albans City and District Council election. Liberal Democrats in yellow, Conservatives in blue and Labour in red.

The 1999 St Albans City and District Council election took place on 6 May 1999 to elect members of St Albans City and District Council in Hertfordshire, England. The whole council was up for election with boundary changes since the last election in 1998 increasing the number of seats by 1. The Liberal Democrats lost overall control of the council to no overall control.

== Election result ==
Both the Liberal Democrats and Conservatives won 21 seats, while Labour took 16 seats. Boundary changes had increased the number of seats to 58 from 57, with an exact seat in Sandridge ward. The closest result was in Harpenden East, where Conservative Michael Clark won a seat by 3 votes defeating the mayor Brian Peyton. Overall turnout at the election was 37.1%, up from 35.3% at the 1998 election but down from the 39.6% in 1996.

St Albans local election result 1999
Party	Seats	Gains	Losses	Net gain/loss	Seats %	Votes %	Votes	+/−
Liberal Democrats	21			-9	36.2	34.8	36,609	-1.1%
Conservative	21			+10	36.2	34.5	36,217	+1.2%
Labour	16			0	27.6	30.5	32,101	-0.3%
Independent	0			0	0	0.2	178	+0.2%

== Ward results ==
Ashley (3 seats)
Party	Candidate	Votes	%	±%
Labour	Alistair Cooper	1,007	58.8	
Labour	Malachy Pakenham	946	55.2	
Labour	Edward Hill	944	55.1	
Liberal Democrats	Francesca Day	444	25.9	
Liberal Democrats	Dawn Devereux	442	25.8	
Liberal Democrats	David Parry	378	22.1	
Conservative	James Black	319	18.6	
Conservative	Peter White	287	16.7	
Conservative	Philip Oxley	284	16.6	
Turnout		1,714	34.7	

Batchwood (3 seats)
Party	Candidate	Votes	%	±%
Labour	David McManus	1,063	65.4	
Labour	Roma Mills	1,045	64.3	
Labour	Andrew Rose	990	60.9	
Liberal Democrats	Richard Biddle	283	17.4	
Conservative	Edward Ellis	269	16.5	
Conservative	Pamela Farley	265	16.3	
Liberal Democrats	Robin Law	257	15.8	
Conservative	Margaret Winterhoff	250	15.4	
Liberal Democrats	Robert Latham	242	14.9	
Turnout		1,626	32.8	

Clarence (3 seats)
Party	Candidate	Votes	%	±%
Liberal Democrats	Sheila Burton	1,089	53.5	
Liberal Democrats	Joyce Lusby	1,018	50.0	
Liberal Democrats	John Wright	1,006	49.4	
Labour	Nigel Culkin	619	30.4	
Labour	Helen Hutchinson	605	29.7	
Labour	Clive Newport	581	28.5	
Conservative	Jeremy Christie	356	17.5	
Conservative	Nigel Woodsmith	350	17.2	
Conservative	James Vessey	340	16.7	
Turnout		2,037		

Colney Heath (2 seats)
Party	Candidate	Votes	%	±%
Liberal Democrats	Susan Defoe	532	47.6	
Liberal Democrats	John Henchley	531	47.5	
Conservative	Julia Jeffrey	288	25.8	
Labour	Gordon Watson	288	25.8	
Conservative	Derek Jeffrey	282	25.2	
Labour	Michael Gibson	268	24.0	
Turnout		1,117	33.7	

Cunningham (3 seats)
Party	Candidate	Votes	%	±%
Liberal Democrats	Robert Donald	1,007	47.1	
Liberal Democrats	Edward Roberts	882	41.2	
Labour	Andrew Gilson	877	41.0	
Liberal Democrats	Geoffrey Harrison	848	39.6	
Labour	Laurence Heyman	846	39.6	
Labour	David Allan	839	39.2	
Conservative	Diana Hall	354	16.5	
Conservative	Graham Leonard	323	15.1	
Conservative	Louisa-Jane Rosalki	299	14.0	
Turnout		2,139	45.0	

Harpenden East (3 seats)
Party	Candidate	Votes	%	±%
Liberal Democrats	David Waddilove	862	41.8	
Liberal Democrats	Alison Steer	834	40.4	
Conservative	Michael Clark	799	38.7	
Liberal Democrats	Brian Peyton	796	38.6	
Conservative	John Cozens	741	35.9	
Conservative	Victor Holley	735	35.6	
Labour	David Crew	470	22.8	
Labour	Rosemary Ross	417	20.2	
Labour	Elizabeth McShane	398	19.3	
Turnout		2,062	38.1	

Harpenden North (3 seats)
Party	Candidate	Votes	%	±%
Conservative	Albert Pawle	820	45.1	
Liberal Democrats	John Coad	814	44.8	
Conservative	David Coe	787	43.3	
Conservative	Maurice Purkiss	776	42.7	
Liberal Democrats	Terence Glenister	726	40.0	
Liberal Democrats	Valerie Goodyear	702	38.6	
Labour	David Dunmore	236	13.0	
Labour	Gavin Ross	235	12.9	
Labour	Richard Botterill	232	12.8	
Turnout		1,817	34.9	

Harpenden South (3 seats)
Party	Candidate	Votes	%	±%
Conservative	Paul Foster	1,113	58.5	
Conservative	Patrick Johnston	1,093	57.4	
Conservative	Michael Morrell	1,081	56.8	
Liberal Democrats	Katharine Sutton	456	23.9	
Liberal Democrats	Christopher Canfield	441	23.2	
Liberal Democrats	Paul De Kort	389	20.4	
Labour	Julie Lightfoot	353	18.5	
Labour	Enid Bright	334	17.5	
Labour	Melvin Cato	323	17.0	
Turnout		1,904	36.2	

Harpenden West (3 seats)
Party	Candidate	Votes	%	±%
Conservative	Julian Daly	1,189	61.3	
Conservative	John Newman	1,170	60.3	
Conservative	Julian Turner	1,170	60.3	
Liberal Democrats	Mary Skinner	430	22.2	
Liberal Democrats	George Gostling	411	21.2	
Liberal Democrats	Paul Spinks	410	21.1	
Labour	Ruth Gordon-Weeks	316	16.3	
Labour	Elizabeth Rayner	295	15.2	
Labour	David Lawlor	288	14.8	
Turnout		1,940	34.0	

London Colney (3 seats)
Party	Candidate	Votes	%	±%
Labour	Malcolm MacMillan	1,064	68.4	
Labour	Etheldreda Gordon	1,047	67.3	
Labour	Sean Flynn	1,026	66.0	
Conservative	Avril Foster	293	18.8	
Conservative	Derek Caroline	277	17.8	
Conservative	Carol Howard	277	17.8	
Liberal Democrats	Sarah Piercy	159	10.2	
Liberal Democrats	David Priestman	149	9.6	
Liberal Democrats	Moira Seton	124	8.0	
Turnout		1,555	26.4	

Marshalswick North (3 seats)
Party	Candidate	Votes	%	±%
Liberal Democrats	Geoffrey Churchard	910	45.5	
Liberal Democrats	Thomas Clegg	826	41.3	
Liberal Democrats	Jennifer Stroud	803	40.1	
Conservative	Frances Leonard	716	35.8	
Conservative	John Foster	698	34.9	
Conservative	Michael Bretherton	676	33.8	
Labour	John Baughan	398	19.9	
Labour	Flora Falconer	378	18.9	
Labour	Lynda Harris	371	18.5	
Turnout		2,002	39.8	

Marshalswick South (3 seats)
Party	Candidate	Votes	%	±%
Liberal Democrats	Anthony Rowland	1,088	49.4	
Liberal Democrats	John Peters	946	42.9	
Liberal Democrats	Joy Winder	865	39.2	
Conservative	Brian Doble	700	31.8	
Conservative	Agnes Hill	697	31.6	
Conservative	Philip Webster	682	30.9	
Labour	Eleanor Harris	518	23.5	
Labour	Jane Cloke	486	22.1	
Labour	Janet Smith	463	21.0	
Turnout		2,204	42.2	

Park Street (3 seats)
Party	Candidate	Votes	%	±%
Liberal Democrats	Richard Downs	702	39.6	
Liberal Democrats	Barry Blackwell	671	37.8	
Conservative	Thomas Burns	668	37.7	
Conservative	Michael Pugh	660	37.2	
Conservative	Nigel Cocks	659	37.1	
Liberal Democrats	Syed Abidi	646	36.4	
Labour	Mary Morley	418	23.6	
Labour	David Davies	378	21.3	
Labour	Ronald Wilson	357	20.1	
Turnout		1,774	32.7	

Redbourn (3 seats)
Party	Candidate	Votes	%	±%
Conservative	Margaret Corley	851	44.3	
Liberal Democrats	Patricia Schofield	818	42.6	
Conservative	Brian Chapman	797	41.5	
Conservative	Paul Finigan	696	36.3	
Liberal Democrats	John Schofield	675	35.2	
Liberal Democrats	Eric Humbles	630	32.8	
Labour	Colin Hucklesby	336	17.5	
Labour	Vivienne Windle	305	15.9	
Labour	John Paton	253	13.2	
Turnout		1,920	41.4	

Sandridge (2 seats)
Party	Candidate	Votes	%	±%
Conservative	Christopher Whiteside	637	42.8	
Liberal Democrats	William Morris	564	37.9	
Conservative	Beric Read	529	35.6	
Liberal Democrats	Laurence Brown	449	30.2	
Labour	Christine Dawson	260	17.5	
Labour	John Tomblin	249	16.7	
Independent	Basil Filmer	178	12.0	
Turnout		1,488	39.7	

Sopwell (3 seats)
Party	Candidate	Votes	%	±%
Labour	Janetta Gibbs	1,043	68.0	
Labour	David Enright	1,034	67.4	
Labour	Mark Wilson	1,016	66.3	
Conservative	Eileen Brown	287	18.7	
Conservative	Janet Cameron	276	18.0	
Conservative	Margaret Brownlie	274	17.9	
Liberal Democrats	Peter Harris	192	12.5	
Liberal Democrats	John Hale	178	11.6	
Liberal Democrats	David Terrar	157	10.2	
Turnout		1,533	28.9	

St Peters (3 seats)
Party	Candidate	Votes	%	±%
Labour	Lynette Warren	973	54.8	
Labour	Winifred Dunleavy	955	53.8	
Labour	Helen Ives-Rose	912	51.4	
Liberal Democrats	John Gunner	544	30.7	
Liberal Democrats	Alisdair Gould	528	29.8	
Liberal Democrats	Michael Saunders	491	27.7	
Conservative	Geoffrey Brown	272	15.3	
Conservative	Sheila Sanders	264	14.9	
Conservative	Mark Shaw	227	12.8	
Turnout		1,774	34.4	

St Stephen (3 seats)
Party	Candidate	Votes	%	±%
Conservative	Gordon Myland	904	46.2	
Conservative	Susan Carr	836	42.7	
Conservative	Hazel Ward	826	42.2	
Liberal Democrats	Kahlil Moghul	740	37.8	
Liberal Democrats	Jadwiga Baillie	708	36.2	
Liberal Democrats	Gerald Kaye	647	33.1	
Labour	Patricia Allen	314	16.0	
Labour	Janet Blackwell	306	15.6	
Labour	Anthony Allen	282	14.4	
Turnout		1,957	38.2	

Verulam (3 seats)
Party	Candidate	Votes	%	±%
Conservative	John Smith	1,124	46.8	
Conservative	Richard Blossom	1,030	42.9	
Conservative	Clare Ellis	991	41.2	
Liberal Democrats	Martin Frearson	930	38.7	
Liberal Democrats	Kathleen Morris	885	36.8	
Liberal Democrats	Susan Campbell	859	35.7	
Labour	Karl Bruckdorfer	434	18.1	
Labour	Jilliam Butchart	432	18.0	
Labour	Constance Vuolo	406	16.9	
Turnout		2,403	45.8	

Wheathampstead (3 seats)
Party	Candidate	Votes	%	±%
Liberal Democrats	Christopher Oxley	964	45.5	
Conservative	Keith Stammers	963	45.4	
Conservative	Gillian Clark	888	41.9	
Liberal Democrats	Neil Page	804	37.9	
Conservative	Derek Hills	802	37.8	
Liberal Democrats	Paul Edelston	727	34.3	
Labour	Peter Woodhams	310	14.6	
Labour	Mary Cheale	294	13.9	
Labour	Michael Fletcher	268	12.6	
Turnout		2,119	44.5	

== By-elections between 1999 and 2000 ==
Verulam by-election 2 December 1999
Party	Candidate	Votes	%	±%
Conservative		911	47.0	+1.8
Liberal Democrats		858	44.3	+6.9
Labour		168	8.7	−8.7
Majority		53	2.7	
Turnout		1,937	37.0	−8.8
Conservative hold		Swing		
