= Simon Grover =

British actor and writer (born 1966)

St Albans District Councillor for St Peter's Ward
- Incumbent
- Assumed office 5 May 2011

Personal details
- Born: Simon Grover; 25 November 1966 (age 59) St Albans, Hertfordshire, England
- Party: The Green Party

Simon Grover (born 25 November 1966) is a British actor, writer and communications consultant. He is also a Green Party councillor on St Albans City & District Council, representing St Peter's ward.

As an actor, he played main characters in two BBC children's series: Gigglebiz and Tweenies. He appeared in the feature film Harry Potter and the Deathly Hallows – Part 1 (2010), in which he played a Death Eater. He has also written for children's television series, including Waybuloo, Fimbles, Bobinogs, Big Cook, Little Cook, Fun Song Factory, Driver Dan's Story Train, and Planet Cook.

== Partial filmography ==
Year	Title	Role	Notes
1998	Bill's New Frock	Bill's Dad	Special
1999–2002	Tweenies	Max; Judy	
2004	Short	Tall Business Clerk	Short
2009–2013	Gigglebiz	Ensemble	
2010	Harry Potter and the Deathly Hallows – Part 1	Death Eater	
2010	London Boulevard	Porter at Storage	Uncredited

== Political career ==
Grover has represented St Peter's ward on St Albans City and District council since the 2011 elections, having been re-elected in 2012, 2016, 2021 and 2023. As of the 2023 St Albans City and District Council elections, Grover is no longer the sole Green on the council. He now leads the council's Green Party Group.

He was the Green Party's candidate to represent St Albans in the UK parliament at the 2019 general election, coming fourth, and the 2024 general election. Grover came fifth in 2024, but earned 6.3% of the votes, an increase of 4.6% and the highest number of votes for the Green Party in the St Albans constituency.
