= Rankin (photographer) =

British photographer (born 1966)

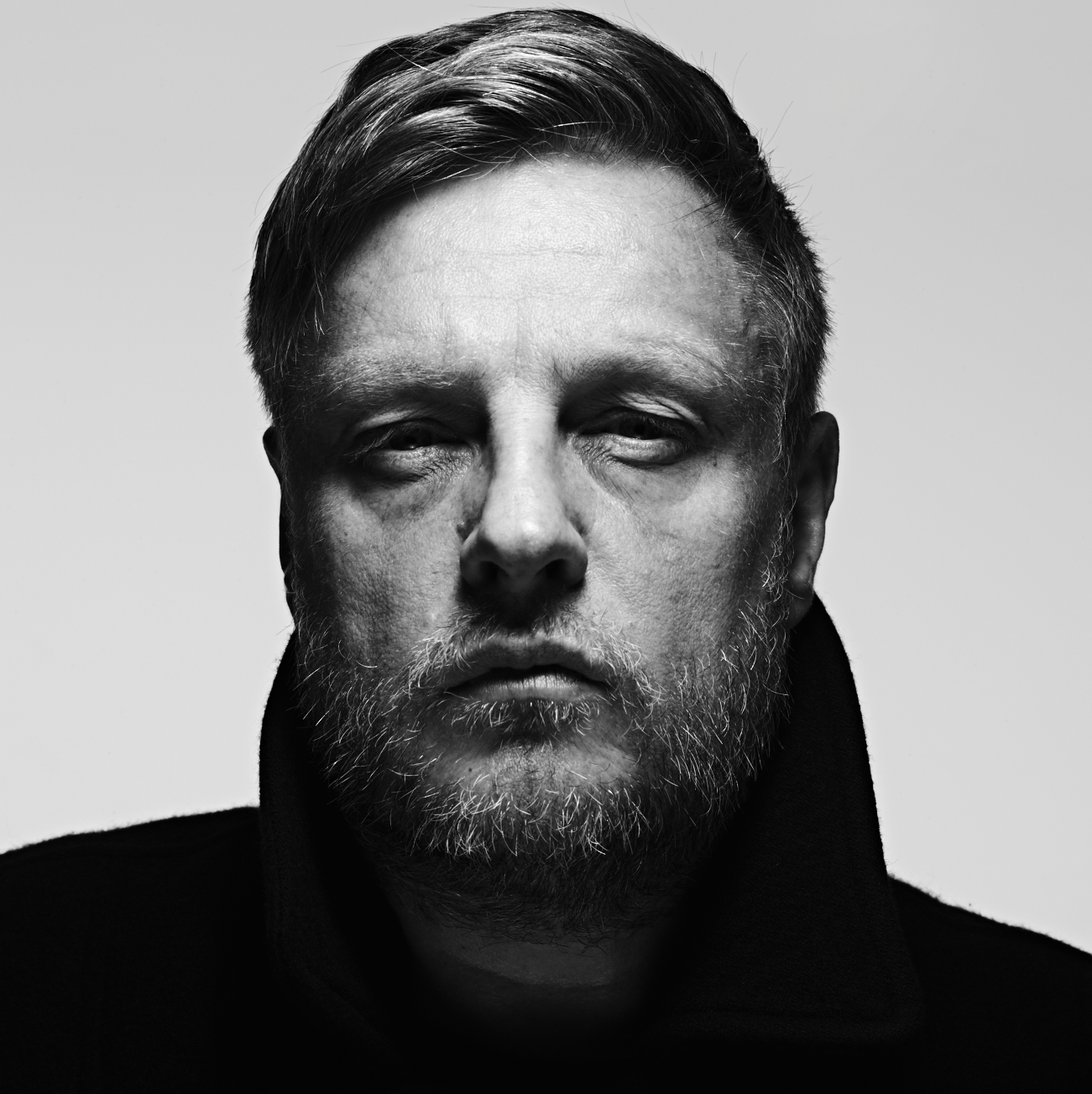
- Rankin in 2021
- Born: John Rankin Waddell; April 1966 (age 60); Glasgow, Scotland
- Education: Thirsk School; Beaumont School; Brighton Polytechnic; Barnfield College
- Alma mater: London College of Printing
- Occupations: Photographer; Director; Publisher
- Spouses: Kate Hardie (m. 1995; div. 1998) Tuuli Shipster (m. 2009)
- Children: 1
- Website: rankinphoto.co.uk

John Rankin Waddell (born 1966), known as Rankin, is a British photographer and director who has photographed, amongst other subjects, Björk, Kate Moss, Madonna, David Bowie and Queen Elizabeth II.

The London Evening Standard described Rankin's fashion and portrait photography style as "high-gloss, highly sexed and hyper-perfect".

He has directed music videos, documentaries, a feature film, short films and commercials.

== Early life and education ==
Rankin was born in Glasgow. In 1976, his family moved to Yorkshire, where he attended Thirsk School. They again relocated, to St Albans, where he studied at Beaumont School.

He worked as a hospital porter when he was 21, and studied accounting at Brighton Polytechnic until he realised his interests lay elsewhere and dropped out.

Rankin took up photography on a BTech course at Barnfield College in Luton, and then a BA course at the London College of Printing. He did not graduate from either.

== Celebrity portraits ==
Rankin's portraiture includes:

- The Queen
- Andre 3000
- Adele
- Damon Albarn
- Lily Allen
- Nicole Appleton
- Richard Ashcroft
- Iggy Azalea
- Azealia Banks
- Monica Bellucci
- Juliette Binoche
- Bjork
- Tony Blair
- LeBron James
- Ian Brown
- Gisele Bündchen
- Cate Blanchett
- Erin O'Connor
- Beck
- David Bowie
- Gordon Brown
- Kathy Burke
- Naomi Campbell
- Leonardo DiCaprio
- Helena Christensen
- Jarvis Cocker
- Mat Collishaw
- Cindy Crawford
- Quentin Crisp
- Miley Cyrus
- Cara Delevingne
- Robert Downey Jr.
- Sophie Ellis-Bextor
- Eminem
- The Enemy
- Marianne Faithfull
- Sky Ferreira
- Future
- Liam Gallagher
- Noel Gallagher
- David Gandy
- Ricky Gervais
- Goldie
- Douglas Gordon
- Daphne Guinness
- Mikhail Gorbachev
- Hugh Grant
- Macy Gray
- Winnie Harlow
- Debbie Harry
- Eva Herzigova
- Damien Hirst
- Rosie Huntington-Whitely
- Natalie Imbruglia
- Michael Jackson
- Mick Jagger
- Kendall Jenner
- Scarlett Johansson
- Alex Jones
- Grace Jones
- Milla Jovovich
- Kelis
- Heidi Klum
- Jared Leto
- Little Boots
- Lindsay Lohan
- Jay-Z
- Jude Law
- Lucy Liu
- Elle Macpherson
- Madonna
- Sienna Miller
- Kylie Minogue
- Helen Mirren
- Erdem Moralıoğlu
- Alanis Morissette
- Kate Moss
- Roland Mouret
- Carey Mulligan
- Cillian Murphy
- Rita Ora
- Jade Parfitt
- Giorgio Pasotti
- Pete and the Pirates
- Oscar de la Renta
- Arlene Phillips
- Zara Phillips
- Keith Richards
- Michael Stipe
- Rolling Stones
- Rebecca Romijn
- Elie Saab
- Arnold Schwarzenegger
- Chloë Sevigny
- Paul Smith
- Sheridan Smith
- Kevin Spacey
- Britney Spears
- Spice Girls
- U2
- Liv Tyler
- Emma Watson
- Florence Welch
- Vivienne Westwood
- The White Stripes
- Will.i.am
- Kate Winslet
- Jo Wood
- Jason Wu
- Alex Zane

His portrait of "a drained-looking" Tony Blair, taken on the eve of the Iraq War for the cover of the Financial Times magazine, was seen as controversial.

== Music videos ==
Rankin has directed music videos for artists including:-

- Iggy Azalea
- Azealia Banks
- Brooke Candy
- Cheryl Cole
- Joel Compass
- Miley Cyrus
- Kat Dahlia
- Marina Diamandis
- The Enemy
- Sky Ferreira
- Nelly Furtado
- Future
- Kacy Hill
- Kelis
- Tove Lo
- The Noisettes
- Rita Ora
- Robyn
- Kelly Rowland
- Tinie Tempah

== Magazines and books ==
Dazed & Confused, published spring 2020

Rankin's works have appeared on the cover of magazines including Vogue, Elle, Harpers Bazaar, Vanity Fair, GQ and Rolling Stone.

In 1991, Rankin and fellow London College of Printing student Jefferson Hack launched the magazine Dazed & Confused. They drew upon their experience with earlier college magazine Untitled.

He launched his own fashion magazine, Rank, in 2000. Rankin is also publisher of AnOther Magazine and AnOther Man. In 2011, he founded Hunger.

Rankin has published over forty photobooks including Female Nudes (1999), Rankin Male Nudes (2000), Breeding: A Study of Sexual Ambiguity (2004), and Beautiful (2007).

Performance by Rankin, published in 2021

== Television ==
Rankin took part in 2008's television reality show Britain's Missing Top Model. The show followed eight young women with disabilities who competed for a modelling contract; photo shoot with Rankin, and Marie Claire magazine cover picture.

In 2011, Rankin was the photography teacher in Jamie's Dream School on Channel 4. He then presented the BBC Four documentary America in Pictures – The Story of Life Magazine.

He travelled to South Africa for the 2012 BBC documentary South Africa in Pictures.

BBC Four broadcast his 2014 documentary Seven Photographs That Changed FashionI, in which he created tributes to images by Cecil Beaton, Erwin Blumenfeld, Richard Avedon, Helmut Newton, Herb Ritts, David Bailey and Guy Bourdin. Rankin interviewed some of the original photographers, models and assistants, and used contemporary models.

Rankin is a regular photographer and guest judge on Germany's Next Topmodel.

He hosted the 2021 Great British Photography Challenge on BBC4.

== Films ==
Rankin has directed films including:

- The Lives of the Saints (2006)
- Hardwire (Short 2013)
- Balance (Short 2014)

He produced visual art for Spectre.

== Exhibitions ==
For his 2009 Brick Lane exhibition Rankin Live, he set out to photograph 1,000 ordinary people, completing one portrait every fifteen minutes, each printed and hung within thirty minutes.

Rankin has exhibited at galleries including MoMA, New York, and the Victoria and Albert Museum.

A Rankin retrospective exhibition The Dazed Decades was held at 180 Studios in London in 2024.

In June 2025, he hosted his exploration of AI and its implications in his Faik exhibition at Annroy studios, giving away to visitors 1,000 free copies of his 'Faik Free' books exploring the topic.

This was immediately followed by his contrasting Back To Reality photography exhibition in the same space, celebrating 35 issues and 15 years of Hunger magazine.

== Commercials ==
Rankin and his production team have created for brands including:-

- Aston Martin
- Audemars Piguet
- Belstaff
- BMW
- Coca-Cola
- Diesel
- Dove
- H&M
- Hugo Boss
- Elle Macpherson (Intimates)
- L'Oreal
- Levi Strauss
- Marks and Spencer
- Mercedes-AMG
- Nike
- Guinness
- Reebok
- Rimmel
- Rolls-Royce
- Samsonite
- Shiatzy Chen
- Umbro

== Campaigns ==
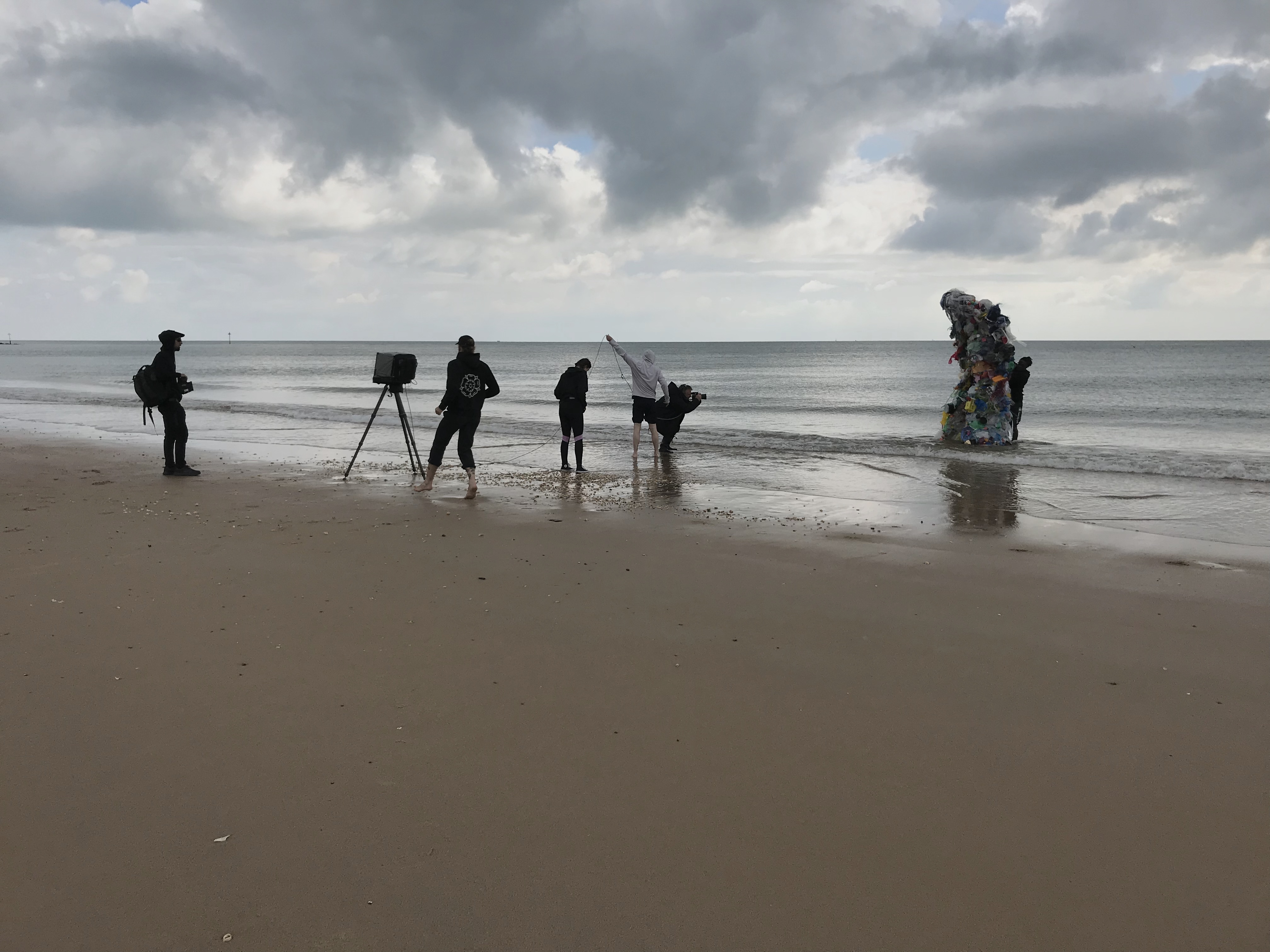
Rankin photographing the Surfrider Foundation Plastic Monster.

Rankin has supported Women's Aid, providing photographs for their Blind Eye, What's It Going To Take?, and Valentine's Day campaigns.

Nike and Product Red commissioned him to shoot their 2012 HIV/AIDS campaign, Lace Up, Save Lives.

In 2019, Rankin designed a plastic waste monster and photographed it to support Surfrider Foundation's initiatives against plastic waste.

During the COVID-19 pandemic in 2020, Rankin shot portraits of NHS staff to celebrate their work.

He was a judge for 2021's Holocaust Memorial Day Trust Light Up The Darkness competition.

Rankin has photographed campaigns for Amnesty International; the Institute of Cancer Research; Oxfam; the Teenage Cancer Trust, and Breast Cancer Awareness

In 2024, he photographed King Charles III for the cover of The Big Issue to highlight the Coronation Food Project.

== Studio ==
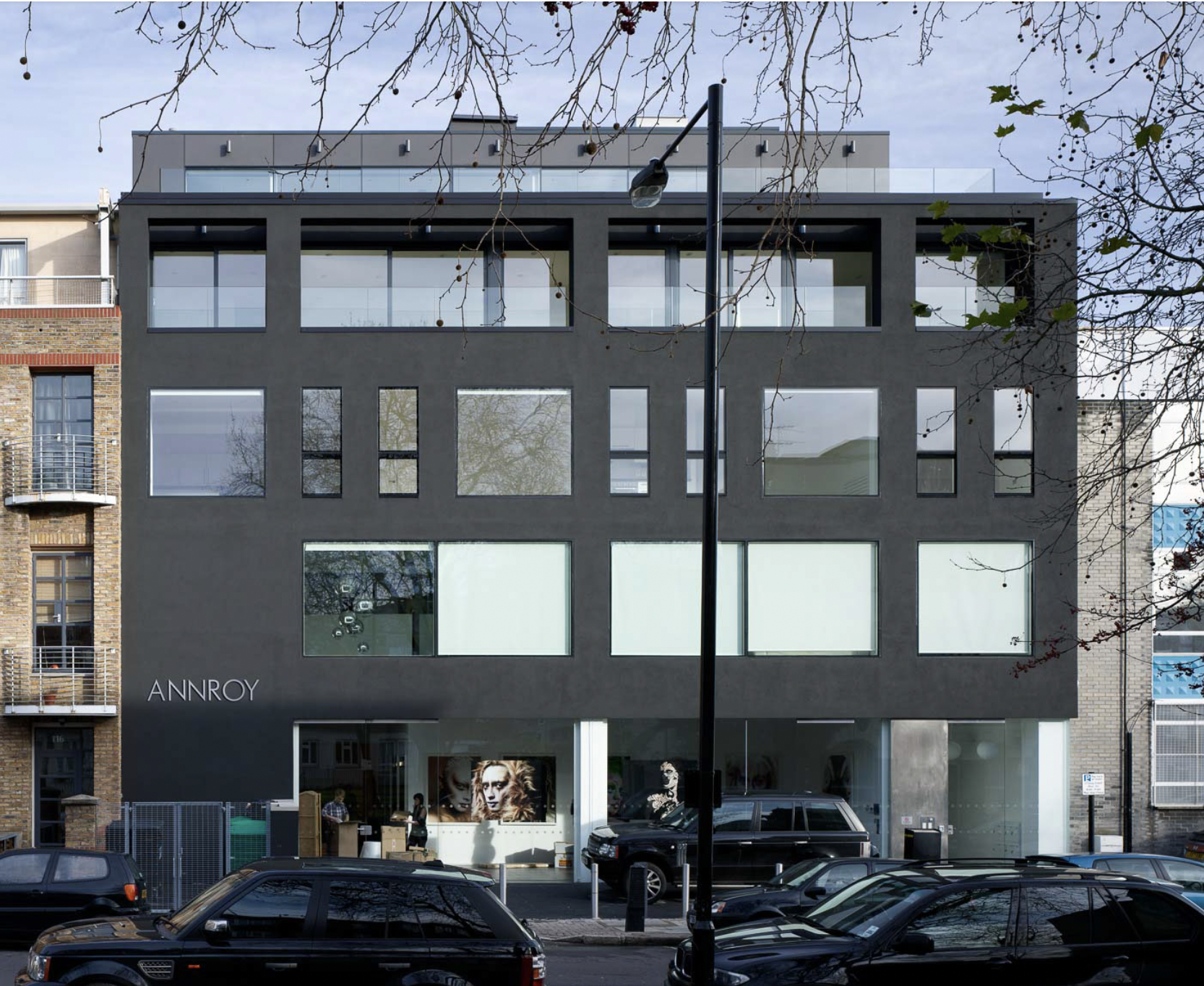
Annroy studio

In 2009, Rankin developed Annroy, a contemporary building in Kentish Town (51.5492°N 0.1478°W). It was designed by Trevor Horne Architects and incorporates Rankin's photographic studio and gallery. The name is a portmanteau of his parents' given names.

== Personal life ==
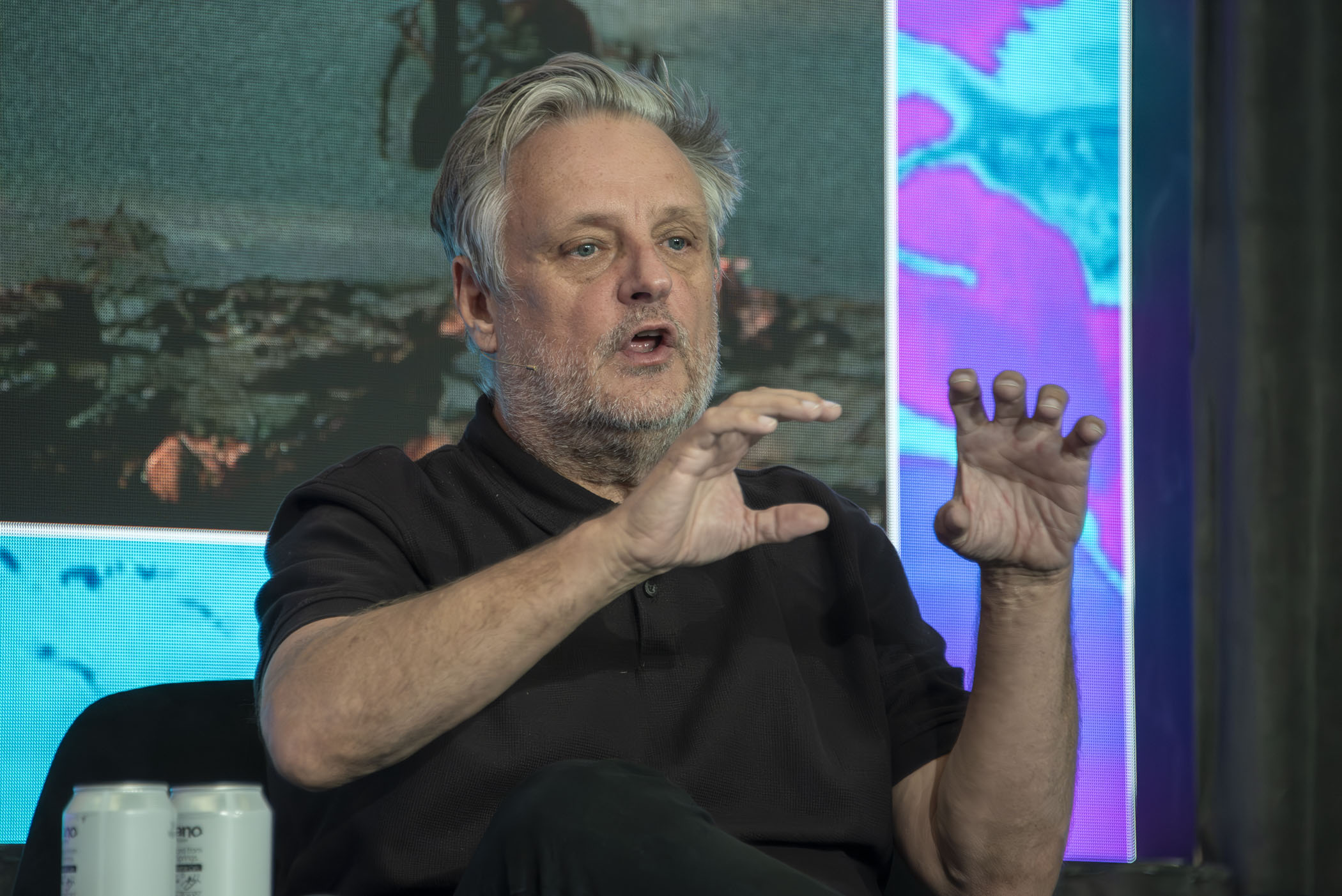
Rankin at SXSW London in June 2025.

Rankin was married to actress Kate Hardie from 1995 to 1998. Since 2009, he has been married to model and yoga teacher Tuuli Shipster.

He is a supporter of Battersea Dogs & Cats Home, where his wife volunteers, and has donated a series of photographs to the charity.

== Awards ==
- Honorary Fellowship of the Royal Photographic Society (2002)
- Co-awardee for Best Advertising and Best Editing – London Fashion Film Festival (2015)
- Lifetime Achievement Award - Mercedes-Benz Bokeh Fashion Film Festival (2016)
- British Photography Awards Fellowship (2019)
