= Anna Cleveland =

American fashion model (born 1989)

- Born: 19 March 1989 (age 37); Amsterdam, Netherlands
- Occupation: Model
- Years active: 1989–present
- Spouse: Jefferson Hack (m. 2023)
- Children: 1
- Parent: Pat Cleveland (mother)
- Relatives: Apollonia van Ravenstein (aunt); Lila Moss (stepdaughter)
- Modeling information
- Height: 5 ft 11.5 in (1.82 m)
- Hair color: Brown
- Eye color: Blue
- Agencies: Marilyn Agency (Paris); Le Management (Hamburg); The Squad (London); View Management (Barcelona)

Anna Cleveland van Ravenstein Hack (born 19 March 1989), known professionally as Anna Cleveland, is an American model.

== Early life ==
Cleveland was born on 19 March 1989 in the Netherlands. Her mother is American model Pat Cleveland and her father is Dutch photographer and model Paul van Ravenstein. Her aunt is Apollonia van Ravenstein. She grew up in Italy near Lake Maggiore.

== Career ==
Her first photoshoot was alongside her mother Pat Cleveland at just ten days old. She has since been on the covers of Flaunt, Grazia, Harper's Bazaar España, and Vogue Italia alongside her mother.

She first walked the runway at age two and would later walk for Chanel, Laura Biagiotti, and Moschino as a child. At age seventeen she was Zac Posen's muse.

In 2015, she began modelling full time. She has since been featured on the covers of 10 Magazine, AnOther Magazine, Glamour España, Harper's Bazaar Netherlands, Interview Deutsch, L'Officiel Argentina, L'Officiel Brasil, L'Officiel España, L'Officiel Italia, L'Officiel Ukraine, Purple, Vogue Czechoslovakia, Vogue Deutsch, Vogue Greece, Vogue Italia, Vogue Japan, Vogue Portugal, Vogue Turkiye, Vogue Ukraine, Women's Wear Daily, and many more.

== Personal life ==
In 2023, Cleveland married Jefferson Hack; Lavinia Biagiotti designed her wedding dress. They have a son.

Through her marriage to Hack she is the stepmother to British model Lila Moss.

== Filmography ==
Music Videos
| Year | Title | Artist | Role | Note |
|---|---|---|---|---|
| 2016 | Wolves | Kanye West | | |
