= The Queen's Head, Sandridge =

Pub at Sandridge, St. Albans, Hertfordshire, England

Coordinates: 51°46′53″N 0°18′15″W

The Queens Head is a public house in the village of Sandridge to the north of St Albans, Hertfordshire, England.

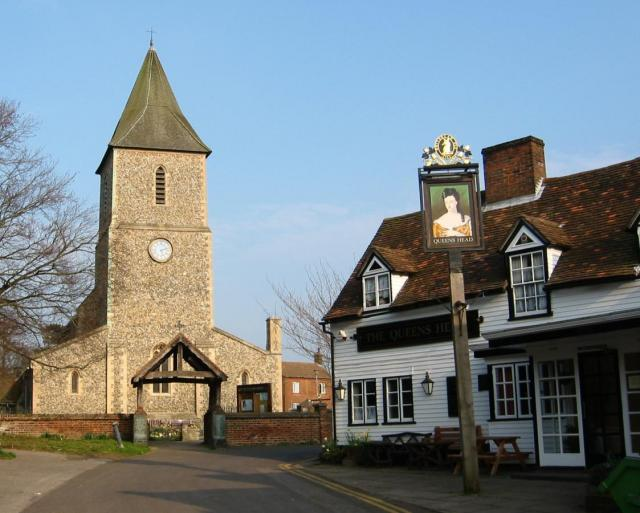
The Queen's Head is located in Church End near St Leonard's Church.

The timber framed building is weather-boarded. It is listed as grade II by Historic England and is dated as "C17 and earlier". The nearby medieval church and its 20th century lychgate are also listed buildings.
