= Sandridge Lychgate =

English war memorial

Coordinates: 51°46′53″N 0°18′14″W

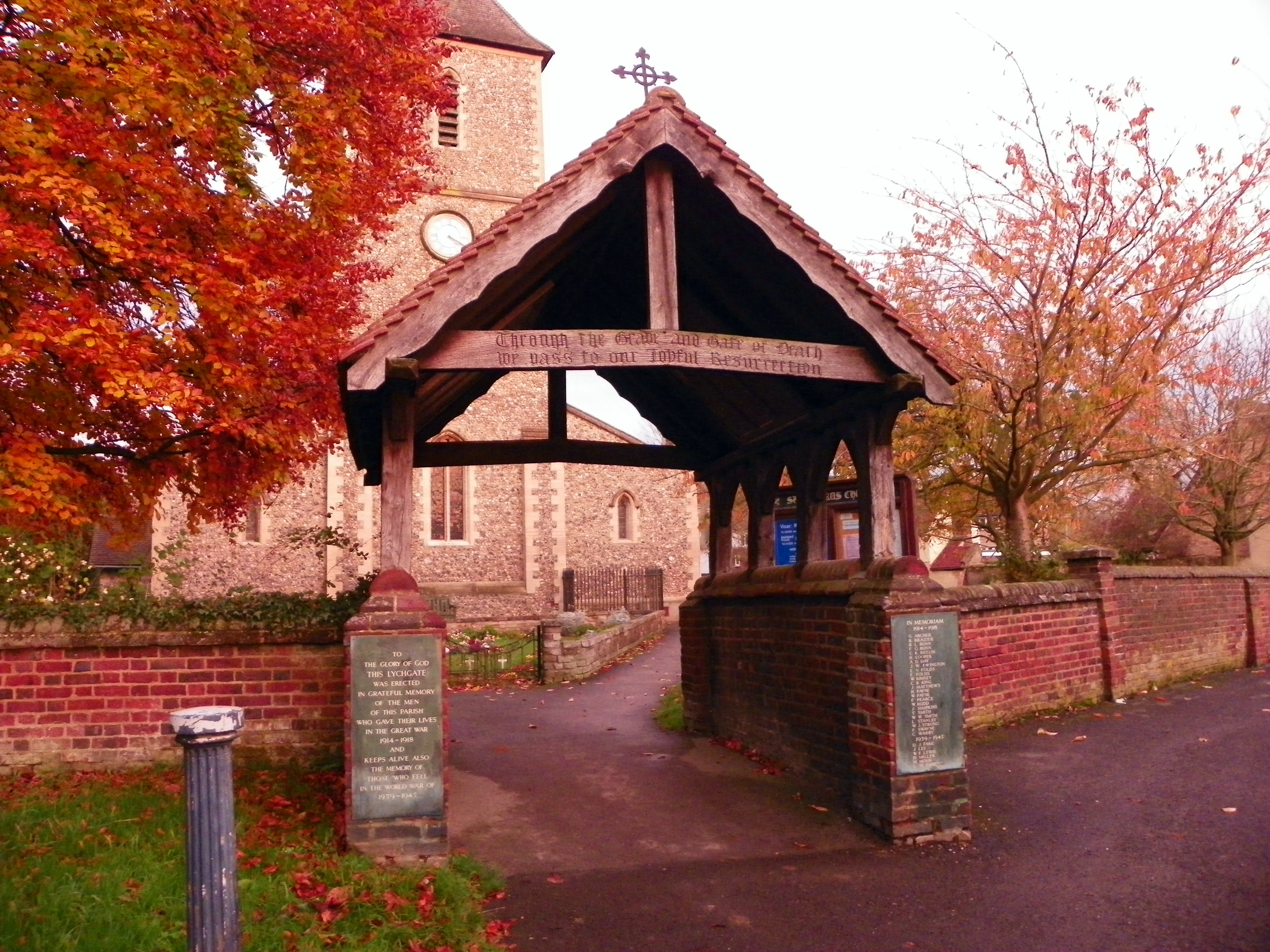

Sandridge Lychgate is a war memorial in the village of Sandridge, Hertfordshire, England. The timber lychgate with its flanking walls is listed Grade II, and is the entrance to the churchyard of St Leonard's Church, Sandridge. It records the names of the community's 24 fallen soldiers and also those of survivors of World War I.

== Background ==
In the aftermath of World War I and its unprecedented casualties, thousands of war memorials were built across Britain. Sandridge is one of a number of lychgate war memorials. Another Hertfordshire example is at Benington.

== Dedication ==
An inscription on the left side of the gate reads

TO / THE GLORY OF GOD / THIS LYCHGATE / WAS ERECTED/ IN GRATEFUL MEMORY / OF THE MEN / OF THIS PARISH / WHO GAVE THEIR LIVES / IN THE GREAT WAR / 1914 - 1918 / AND / KEEPS ALIVE ALSO / THE MEMORY OF / THOSE WHO FELL / IN THE WORLD WAR OF / 1939 - 1945

=== Dedication ceremony ===
Men of Sandridge who survived the Great War. 130 served and returned.

The Lychgate was unveiled and dedicated in a ceremony on Sunday 24 April 1921 at 3pm.

- A detachment of the St Alban's Church Lads' Brigade will line the churchyard leading from the North door
- The Clergy and Choir will take up position on the inside of the Lychgate; the mourners immediately in front of it on the outside; the ex servicemen to the left and the school children to the right. The remainder of the congregation are asked to occupy the ground behind the mourners

The lesson was Revelation xxxi, 1-7 and read by the Reverend T. W. Lister. The Address was given by the Dean of St Albans the Very Reverend G W Blenkin. At the Lychgate itself the unveiling was by Colonel Henry Page Croft MP.

The final hymn sung by the children

Colonel Page Croft M.P. officiating

O valiant Hearts Who to your glory came"

This was followed by the Benediction, then The Last Post a brief silence and the Reveille and the National Anthem.

== Conservation ==
The gate and its flanking walls were listed in 1984.
