= Marshalswick =

Suburb of St Albans, Hertfordshire, England

Coordinates: 51.765150°N 0.307707°W

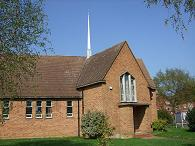
- Parish Church of St Mary's Marshalswick

- Location within Hertfordshire
- Population: 7,338 (2011 Census.Ward)
- OS grid reference: TL167087
- Civil parish: Sandridge (part)
- District: St Albans
- Shire county: Hertfordshire
- Region: East
- Country: England
- Sovereign state: United Kingdom
- Post town: St Albans
- Postcode district: AL1, AL4
- Dialling code: 01727
- Police: Hertfordshire
- Fire: Hertfordshire
- Ambulance: East of England
- UK Parliament: St Albans

Marshalswick is a suburb of St Albans in Hertfordshire, England, located around 1.5 miles northeast of the city centre. The area was developed from the 1920s onwards. Neighbouring suburbs include Jersey Farm, Fleetville and Bernards Heath.

The 1950s parish church of St Mary's was built as a daughter church of St Leonard's Church, Sandridge and later became an ecclesiastical parish in its own right in 1972.

== History ==
The name Marshalswick has been in use since at least the thirteenth century. The name comes from John and William Marschal who owned the land between 1271 and 1377, and wick which meant 'hamlet', 'town' or 'village' in Old English. Despite the name, there was no village of Marshalswick, and until the early twentieth century it was only used for a mansion and a nearby farm, both of which fell within the parish of Sandridge.

The mansion was sold in 1921 and its grounds were developed with housing as an expansion of St Albans. The former driveway to the mansion (which was demolished in 1927) is now a residential road called Marshals Drive. Following the development of the old Marshalswick Mansion grounds in the 1920s and 1930s, Marshalswick Lane and the area south of it were transferred from the parish of Sandridge to the municipal borough of St Albans in 1935.

From the 1950s onwards another large housing estate was laid out on the former Marshalwick Farm land north of Marshalswick Lane. The new estate included a neighbourhood centre at The Quadrant, including numerous shops, St Mary's Church, a community centre and library. The area north of Marshalswick Lane remains in the parish of Sandridge; the old borough of St Albans was not enlarged again after 1935 but was instead abolished in 1974 to create the City and District of St Albans which includes all of the parish of Sandridge. No successor parish was created for the former borough and so that area became an unparished area.

== Local facilities ==
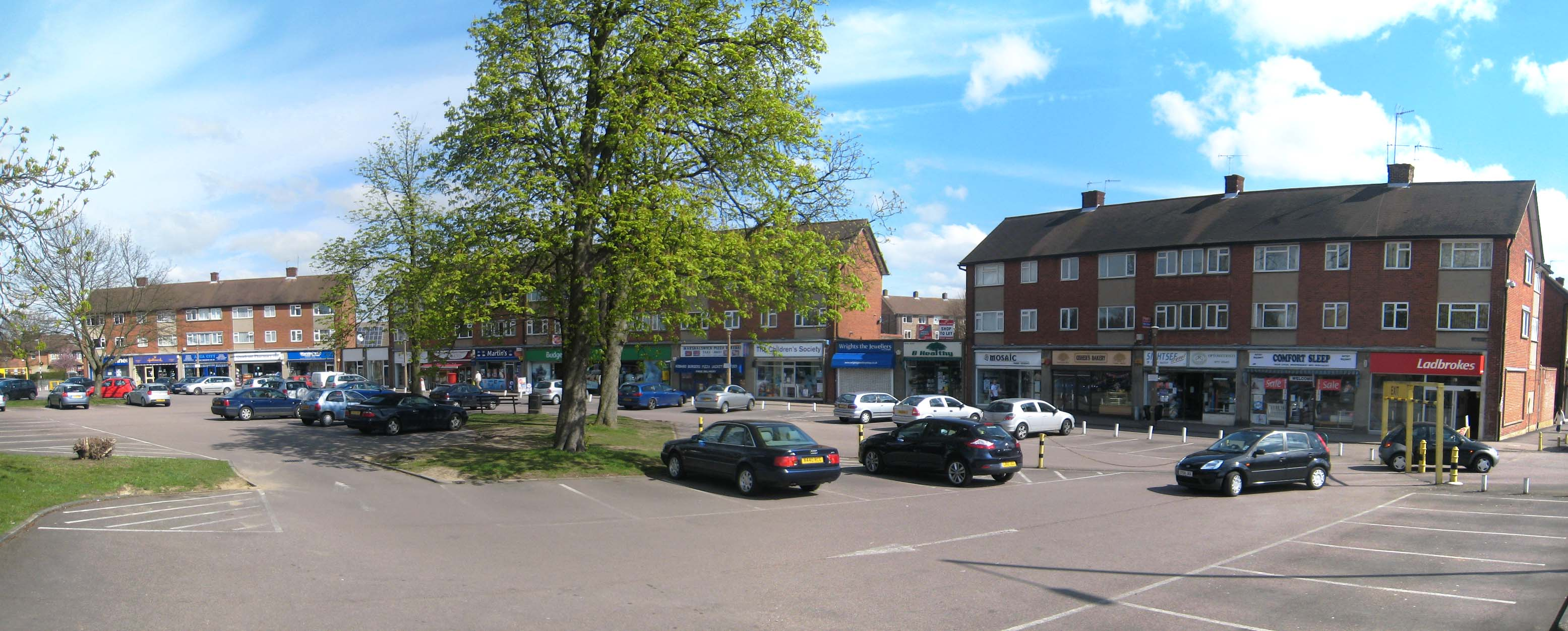
The Quadrant

Marshalswick is home to Sandringham School, which is situated on the Ridgeway. Residents of Marshalswick enjoy the use of local shops which are called 'The Quadrant'. These shops include two bakeries, a Budgens, a newsagent (including a Post Office), Frost's Estate Agents, charity shops, hairdressers, barbers, wine merchants, fast food outlets and many other shops. The Quadrant also has a Sainsbury's Local petrol station, an M&S food hall and a library, which is open every day except Sunday and Wednesdays. The library includes a DVD collection, free computer use and a children’s section.

"The Wick" is now a wooded park which includes a playground, large field and woodland walk area which are frequently used by local Scout groups and dog walkers. Other notable places in Marshalswick, apart from the Wick, include St Mary's Church of England church, Homewood Road United Reformed Church and Marshalswick Baptist Free Church. The churches are each home to local Brownie (Girl Guides) units and their halls are used by many local groups.

== Facts and figures ==
The average age for a person living in Marshalswick is 40 and 3.7% of residents are students. The average 4 bedroom house costs £1,252,000 and house prices range from £650,000 to over £6,000,000 .
