= St Michael, Hertfordshire =

Civil parish in Hertfordshire, England

Coordinates: 51.751389°N 0.386111°W

St Michael
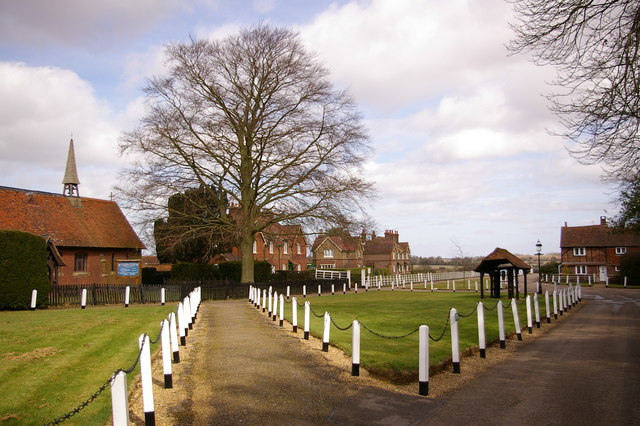
- Childwick Green at Childwickbury, the main settlement in the parish

- Location within Hertfordshire
- Area: 8.2 sq mi (21 km^{2})
- Population: 498 (Parish, 2021)
- OS grid reference: TL113071
- Civil parish: St Michael
- District: St Albans
- Shire county: Hertfordshire
- Region: East
- Country: England
- Sovereign state: United Kingdom
- Post town: St Albans
- Postcode district: AL3
- Dialling code: 01727
- Police: Hertfordshire
- Fire: Hertfordshire
- Ambulance: East of England
- UK Parliament: St Albans

St Michael is a civil parish in the St Albans district in Hertfordshire, England. The parish is named after but no longer includes St Michael's Church in St Albans. Historically the parish covered part of the city (town before 1877) and the rural hinterland to the north-west of it. The parish was split in 1894 with the part outside the city becoming St Michael Rural, which was renamed St Michael in 1974. The main settlement in the modern parish is Childwickbury. The population in 2021 was 498.

== History ==
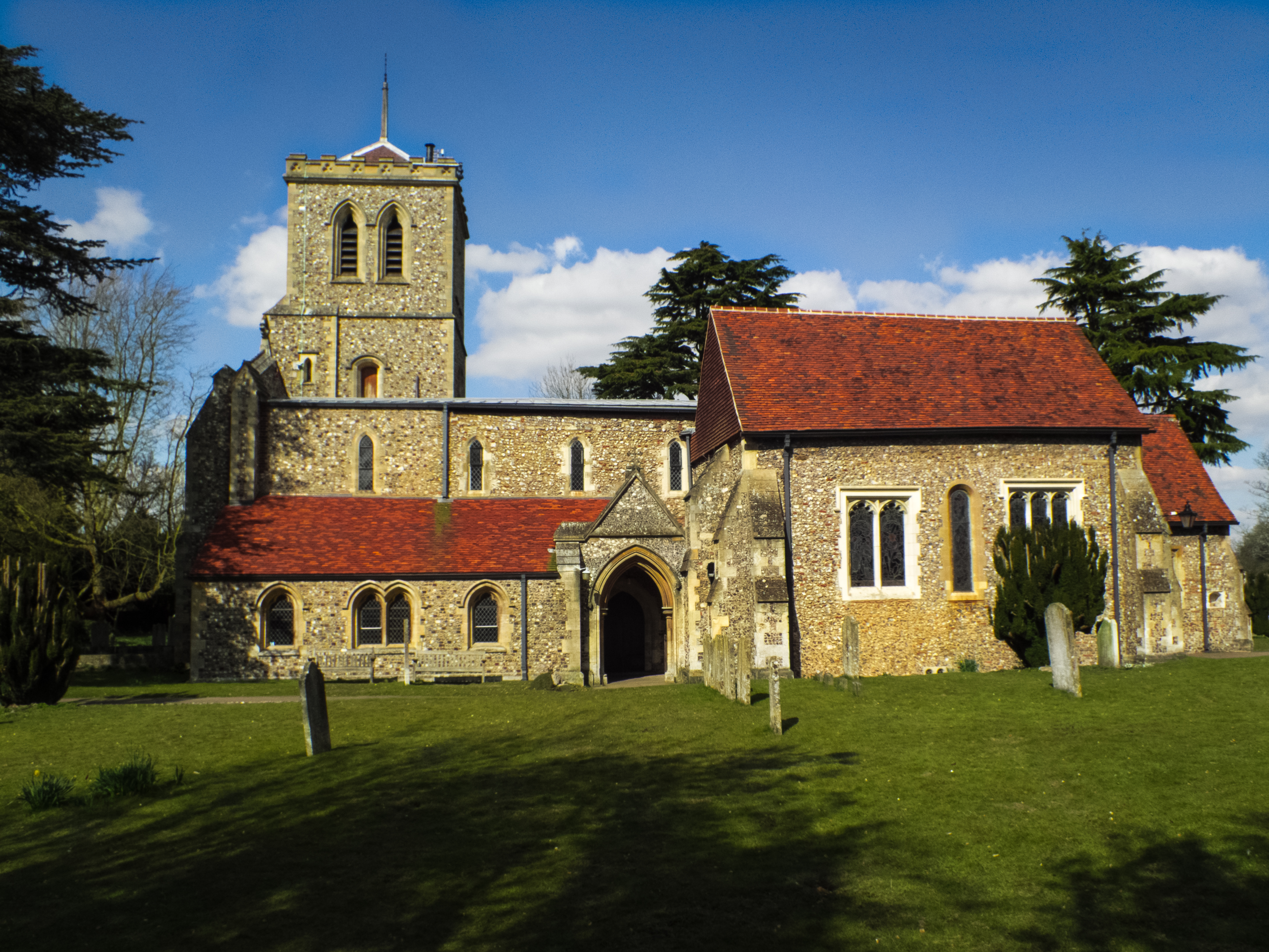
St Michael's Church, which gives its name to the parish.

St Michael was an ancient parish. The parish church was St Michael's Church in St Albans, one of three historic parish churches founded in Saxon times on the main roads leading into the town. Part of the parish was within the municipal borough of St Albans until 1894, when it was split to create St Michael Urban covering the parts within the borough (which included St Michael's Church and the surrounding area) and St Michael Rural outside. St Michael Rural became part of St Albans Rural District.

Parts of St Michael Rural were transferred to the borough of St Albans in 1913 (138 acres) and 1935 (890 acres).

On 1 April 1974 the parish of St Michael Rural was split, with the small part within the designated area for the New Town of Hemel Hempstead going to the unparished area in Dacorum and the remainder (the majority of the area) becoming the parish of St Michael in the St Albans district.

== Geography ==
It comprises a wholly rural area to the west of St Albans and is bounded on its western side by Hemel Hempstead. The parish is bisected by the M1 motorway.

Settlement is dispersed across a number of small and isolated hamlets:

- Appspond
- Breakspears
- Bushwood
- Childwickbury
- Gorhambury
- Potters Crouch

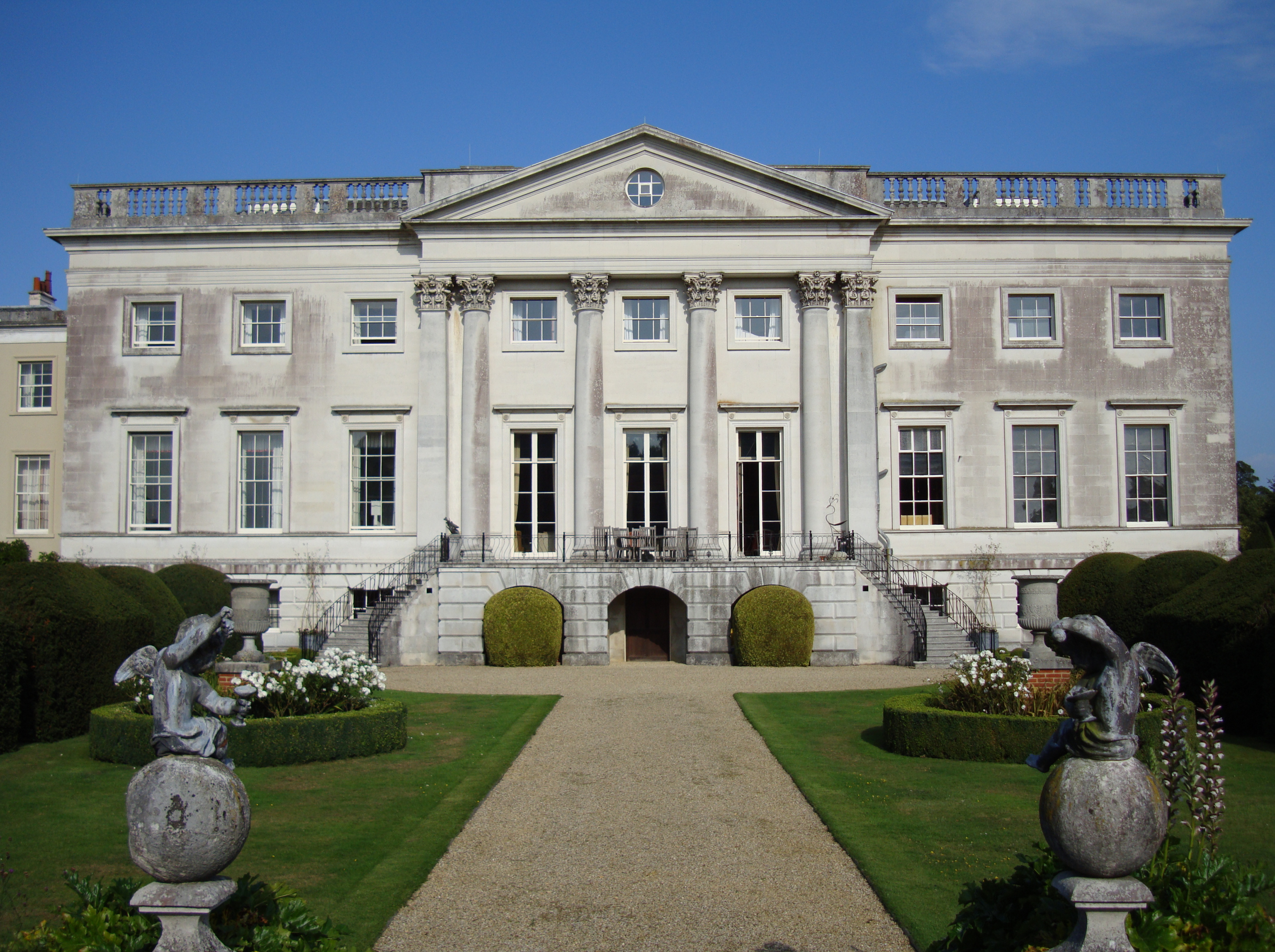
Gorhambury House, built 1777–1784: The Gorhambury estate covers much of the western half of the parish.

Much of the parish is covered by the estates of two large country houses; Childwickbury Manor to the east (home of film director Stanley Kubrick from 1978 until his death in 1999), and Gorhambury House to the west, seat of the Earls of Verulam.

== Governance ==
There are three tiers of local government covering St Michael, at parish, district and county level: St Michael Parish Council, St Albans City and District Council and Hertfordshire County Council. The parish council meets at the old school room adjoining St Mary's Church at Childwick Green.
