= AL6 =

AL6 may refer to:

- AL6, a postcode district in the AL postcode area
- British Rail Class 86
