= Sandringham School =

Location
- The Ridgeway; Marshalswick, St Albans, Hertfordshire, AL4 9NX; England; 51°46′15″N 0°18′28″W

Information
- Type: Academy
- Motto: Everybody can be somebody
- Established: 1988
- Department for Education URN: 136609 Tables
- Ofsted: Reports
- Chair of Governors: Anna Cox
- Headteacher: Mark Nicholls (acting)
- Gender: Coeducational
- Age: 11 to 18
- Enrolment: 1640
- Houses: Austen; Elgar; Fawcett; Hepworth; Johnson; Newton; Shakespeare; Turing
- Colours: Black, Red and Yellow
- Publication: SandPrint (weekly)
- Precursors: Marshalswick School; Wheathampstead School
- Website: http://www.sandringham.herts.sch.uk/

Sandringham School is a secondary school with academy status in Marshalswick, St Albans, Hertfordshire. It was established in 1988 following a merger of two local schools, Marshalswick School and Wheathampstead School. It occupies the former Marshalswick site, adjacent to Wheatfields Infant and Junior schools. The former Wheathampstead site was used as a training centre by Hertfordshire County Council until 2007, and has now been redeveloped into housing.

The school works in partnership with two neighbouring schools to enhance post-16 educational provision. This partnership is known as "BeauSandVer" and consists of Sandringham School, Verulam School and Beaumont School.

Sandringham school primarily serves neighbourhoods in the north east of St Albans (Marshalswick and Jersey Farm) and the villages of Sandridge and Wheathampstead.

== Predecessor schools ==
The two schools which became Sandringham School were Marshalswick School and Wheathampstead School. The Marshalswick school buildings were built in the 1960s, and the school expanded in the 1970s. Wheathampstead School opened in 1965 and closed in 1988.

== Inspection judgements ==
The school was inspected in February 2024 and given the highest verdict of Outstanding in every area.

This was the first inspection by Ofsted since it became an academy in 2012. Before academisation, its last inspection was in 2008, with the judgement of Outstanding.

== Achievements and recognition ==
The school has specialisms in Arts, Science and Leading Edge.

The school has also been awarded High Performing Specialist School status by the SSAT on three successive occasions. It has received the School Achievement Award.

The school is an Accredited Initial Teacher Training Provider (AITTP) which offers QTS through the GTP programme.

The school has hosted a world record attempt for the largest lesson.

On 8 January 2016, pupils from the school made the first amateur radio call to a British astronaut at the International Space Station, contacting Tim Peake as part of his Principia mission during Expedition 46.

== House system ==
The school introduced a house system in 2005 with 6 houses named after famous people. These were called Brunel, Descartes, Einstein, King, Shakespeare and da Vinci.

The names were changed in 2012 to Boudica, Darwin, Erikson, Knight, Seacole and Van Gogh.

Most recently, in 2017, they were changed again, to British figures:

- Boudica became Johnson
- Darwin became Newton
- Erikson became Austen
- Knight became Fawcett
- Seacole became Elgar
- Van Gogh became Turing

The new seventh house was named Shakespeare.

As of the 2019-20 Academic year, a new house was introduced - Hepworth House, named after the famous sculptor.

Each house is led by two Co-Heads of House (staff) assisted by House Captains and a House Committee (students). The Houses compete against each other to win annual events such as sports day, house drama, house music, house dance and house photography. Students are also awarded House Points for high quality work and conduct in lessons.

The total number of points for each House is used to determine which house is the winner of the House competition.

== SandPit Theatre ==
The School has used its specialism in the Arts to build and maintain a professional quality theatre on site. Opened in 2001 (at a cost of £1,000,000), the SandPit is used by the school and community and hosts productions and charity events. The SandPit is also used as a teaching space and as a venue for school assemblies.

== Buildings ==
- A block - primarily History and Geography. Also contains the reception and headteacher's office, school hall, a canteen, a sports hall, the swimming pool and the dance studio
- B block - Design & Technology (including woodwork, food tech, textiles)
- C block - Languages, PRE (philosophy, religion and ethics)
- D block - mainly Business and Economics, Student Services, a canteen, isolation rooms
- E block - Science (physics, biology, chemistry)
- F block - Art (west wing) and Music (east wing). Also connected to the Sandpit Theatre.
- G block - Computer Science, Media Studies
- H block - Staffroom and SEN
- I block - science (ground floor), computer science and maths (2nd floor)
- J block - Drama
- K block - English, Library
- Sports Building - large sports hall, gym, changing rooms and dance studio
- Sixth Form Centre - various classrooms and study areas, as well as a cafe downstairs and an amateur radio room upstairs
- Sandpit Theatre - a 266-seat theatre on the school grounds
