= SRFC =

SRFC may refer to:

- Sacramento Republic FC
- Sandridge Rovers F.C.
- Sandy Row F.C.
- Saracens F.C.
- Saxon Rovers F.C.
- Scarva Rangers F.C.
- Seattle Reign FC
- Shamrock Rovers F.C.
- Sligo Rovers F.C.
- Stade Rennais F.C.
- Stafford Rangers F.C.
- Stanway Rovers F.C.
- Super Reds FC
- Suttonians RFC
- Swansea RFC
