= Mike Chaplin =

British artist (1943–2026

Michael Chaplin RWS RE FRSA
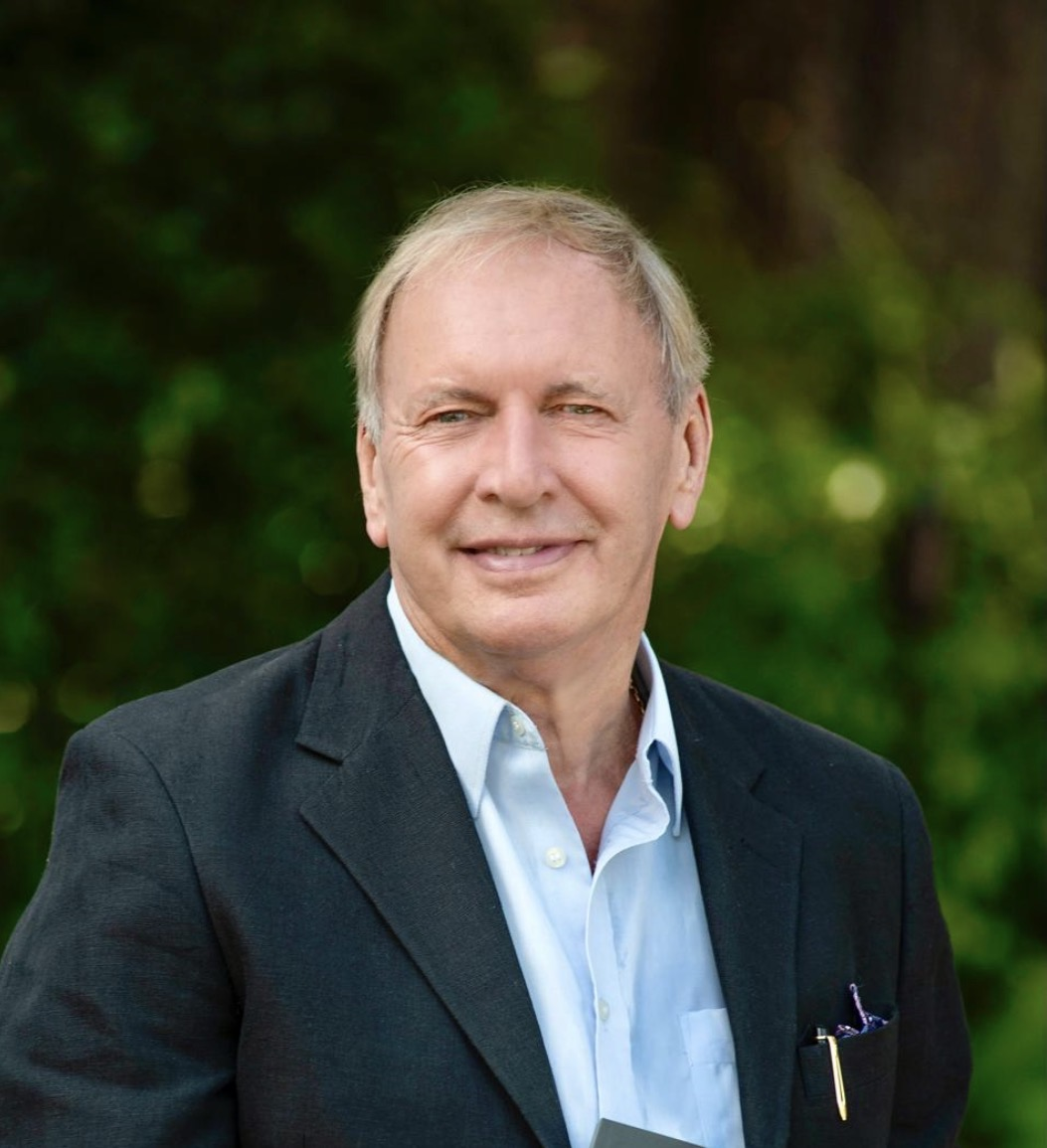
- Chaplin in 2025
- Born: 19 September 1943; Little Barford, Bedfordshire, England
- Died: 1 April 2026 (aged 82); Savannah, Georgia, U.S.
- Education: St. Albans Boys' Grammar School, Watford Technical College School of Art (NDD), Brighton School of Art (Postgraduate)
- Occupation: Artist
- Known for: Watercolour, etching, oil painting
- Awards: The Turner Award 2011
- Website: mikechaplin.co.uk

Michael James Chaplin, RWS, RE, FRSA (19 September 1943 – 1 April 2026) was a British artist, known primarily for his work in the mediums of intaglio printmaking, watercolour and oil painting. He was one of the UK’s foremost experts on the artist J. M. W. Turner, and from 1998 to 2001 was a resident art expert on the Channel 4 television art programme Watercolour Challenge with Hannah Gordon.

== Early life and education ==
Chaplin was born in Little Barford, Bedfordshire, in 1943, the son of Alexander Bridges (Tom) Chaplin and Rose Mary Rebecca (née James), and attended primary school in nearby Sandy.

In the early 1950s, he moved with his parents and older sister to Harpenden in Hertfordshire.

As a child, his love of art was already starting to develop; by the age of 12 he had already decided that he wished to become a professional artist.

He attended St. Albans Boys' Grammar School, where he was a contemporary of Colin Blunstone and Chris White, who later formed the pop group The Zombies. Chaplin was the guitarist in an earlier incarnation of the band alongside Colin Coke and Chris White, called The Markysparks, in reference to Markyate, Chris White's home town.

After completing A-levels, Chaplin spent a short time working as an Art Technician in the school’s art department, before continuing to the School of Art at Watford Technical College to study graphic design, gaining his National Diploma of Design. He followed this with a postgraduate course in Printmaking at the Brighton School of Art, now the University of Brighton Faculty of Arts.

== Career, adult life and death ==
While still a student in the late 1960s, Chaplin's first work as a professional artist was to create woodcut pictures for the dust jackets of books. He sold his first picture for seven guineas.

His earliest fine art pieces were almost all in the medium of etching. The influence of Chaplin's background in graphic design is very clear in these first pictures, which are highly stylised, bordering on abstract. His love of architecture, particularly industrial, was also becoming apparent; an early etching depicts the workings of a disused power station, a motif which would recur later in his career.

After completing his studies, Chaplin married in 1967 and moved with his wife Gay, also an artist, to Maidstone in Kent the following year. They had one son, Nick (born 1977) and one daughter, Briony (born 1980).

In the late 60s, while still a student, Chaplin was elected as an associate of the Royal Society of Painter-Etchers and Engravers, at the time the youngest artist ever to receive this honour. He was later elected to full fellowship in 1971, subsequently serving as Honorary Secretary and Vice President under the presidency of Harry Eccleston, finally becoming a senior fellow of the society.

In 1997, having been an associate since 1993, Chaplin was elected a Full Member of the Royal Watercolour Society.

He was also a Fellow of the Royal Society of Arts.

Throughout his career, Chaplin continued to teach and lecture in Art, holding the post of Senior Art Lecturer at Kingston Polytechnic (now Kingston University) through the 1970s and 80s, and later running many residential Art courses in the UK and internationally.

Chaplin appeared as the resident art expert on the Channel 4 programme Watercolour Challenge with Hannah Gordon, which began in 1998 and ran for three series. Chaplin also filmed an hour-long follow-up video, made to accompany the series.

In 2002, Chaplin was commissioned to produce a series of handling sheets of watercolour techniques for the Tate Gallery to accompany the Thomas Girtin Exhibition (Summer 2002).

2003 saw Chaplin filming for BBC Two's Open University Art History Unit, following in the footsteps of J. M. W. Turner and re-creating some of his paintings of the Lake District.

In 2004, Chaplin demonstrated painting techniques during the El Greco Exhibition at the National Gallery (2004).

In 2005, he worked with the Tate Gallery again, recording audio notes on the Turner exhibits for the gallery's Turner, Whistler & Monet exhibition.

In 2007, Chaplin was given the opportunity to use pigments that had been ground by J. M. W. Turner into watercolour. Chaplin subsequently used the paint to film Turner's watercolour techniques for a permanent exhibition at Tate Britain in London.

In 2010, he presented a DVD, The Challenge of Watercolour.

In 2011, Chaplin worked with the family of J. M. W. Turner to establish the Turner Award for Watercolour as part of the Royal Academy Summer Exhibition, and was himself the recipient of the award in 2011.

In 2013, a major retrospective of Chaplin’s work and career was presented by Maidstone Museum.

Following the death of his wife, Gay, in 2014, Chaplin relocated to Savannah, Georgia, USA, and subsequently married his second wife, June.

In 2016, Chaplin was honoured to paint in the Mall, London, at H.M. Queen Elizabeth II’s Patron's Lunch, the culminating event of her 90th birthday celebrations.

Chaplin's work, both in painting and printmaking, is included in many public and private collections worldwide, including those of HM Queen Elizabeth II, HM Queen Elizabeth The Queen Mother, ex-King Constantine of the Hellenes, Prince and Princess Michael of Kent, the Ashmolean Museum in Oxford, and the Fitzwilliam Museum in Cambridge. One of his large murals also decorates the boardroom of the Daily Express offices in London.

He published three books, Mike Chaplin's Expressive Watercolours, The Complete Book of Drawing and Painting and How to Paint Like Turner.

Chaplin died in Savannah on 1 April 2026, at the age of 82, following a seven-month battle with mesothelioma.
