= Another Man (magazine) =

British men's fashion magazine

- Editor-in-Chief: Ben Cobb
- Categories: Fashion magazine
- Frequency: Biannual
- Founder: Jefferson Hack
- Founded: 2005
- Company: Dazed Media
- Country: United Kingdom
- Based in: London
- Language: English
- Website: www.anothermanmag.com
- ISSN: 1746-7713

Another Man is an international fashion and culture menswear biannual magazine. It was launched in 2005 by Jefferson Hack.

Ben Cobb is Editor-In-Chief of Another Man, having joined the title as Editor in 2010. He became Editor-in-Chief in 2015. Creative Director Alister Mackie has been with the magazine since its launch.

Contributors include photographers Alasdair McLellan, Willy Vanderperre, Ryan McGinley and Nick Knight.

In 2017 the magazine launched its online platform Anothermanmag.com with Ted Stansfield as Digital Editor. Its partner magazine, AnOther, along with Dazed, DazedDigital.com and Dazed Studio are part of Dazed Media.
