= Jersey Farm =

Coordinates: 51.77°N 0.297°W

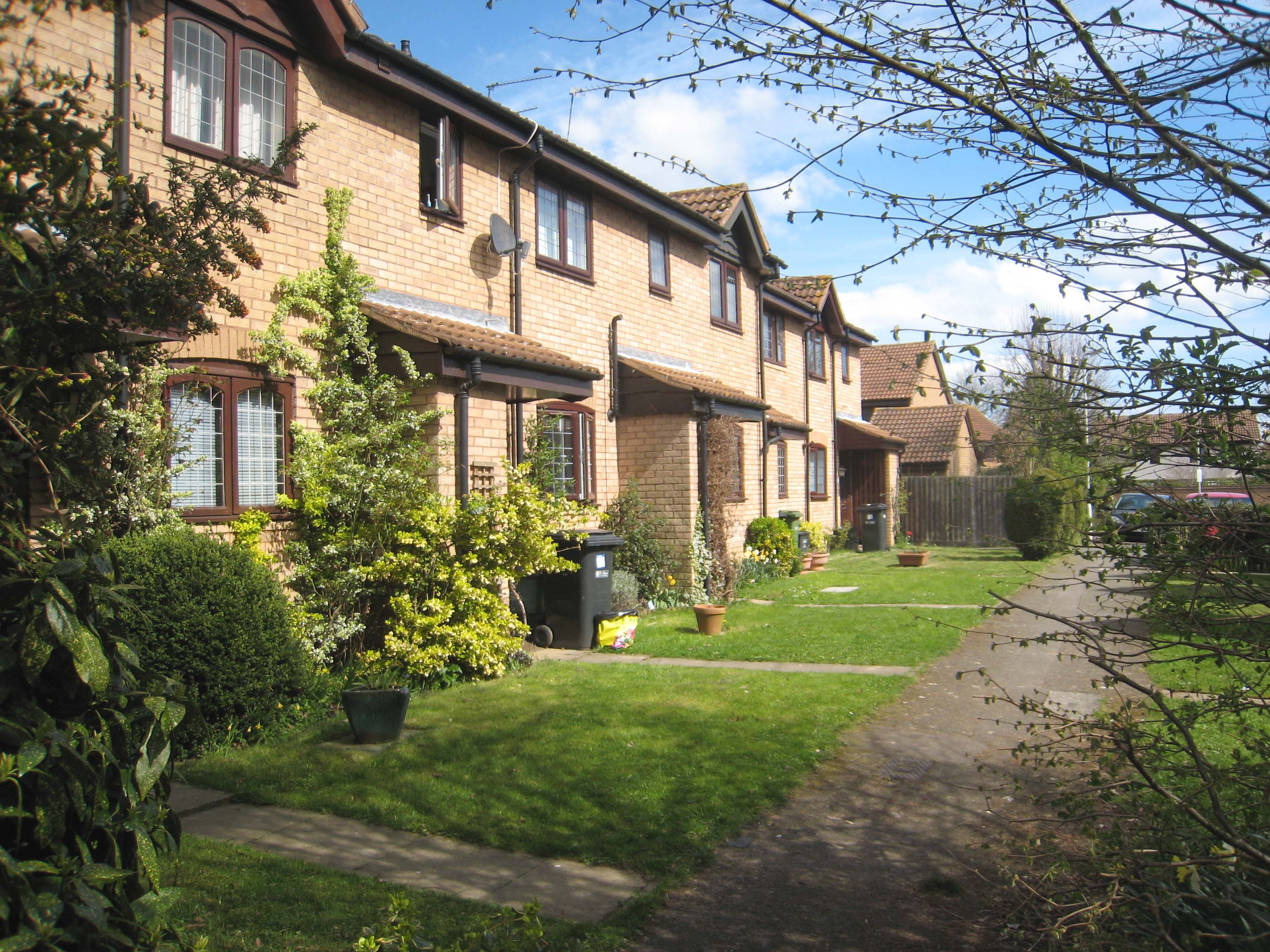
- Houses typical of the area

- Location within Hertfordshire
- Civil parish: Sandridge
- District: St Albans
- Shire county: Hertfordshire
- Region: East
- Country: England
- Sovereign state: United Kingdom
- Post town: ST ALBANS
- Postcode district: AL4
- Dialling code: 01727
- Police: Hertfordshire
- Fire: Hertfordshire
- Ambulance: East of England
- UK Parliament: St Albans

Jersey Farm is a residential neighbourhood in the civil parish of Sandridge centred 1.5 miles (2.4 km) north-east of the city centre of St Albans. It is contiguous with one other settlement, which is larger and has two schools, Marshalswick to the west and south-west and otherwise adjoins fields and farms.

== History and geography ==
The area was converted from cultivated fields into a residential estate in the 1970s, and as such many of the properties are more modern than in the city centre. Local amenities include a pub, small shops and a community centre. It was named after the local farm house which sat close to the current shops. This name was not that old as it changed in the 60s; before that it was known as Evans farm. Its elevations range from 110 metres in the north-west to 77 metres above sea level in the south-east just above a source of a small tributary of the Colne.

== Economy ==
Jersey farm has one pub - The Blackberry Jack, a Chinese takeaway, a fish and chips take away, a combined coffee shop and barber shop - ‘H and Co’, as well as a branch of Tesco Express (including a post office), a pharmacy, an Indian Restaurant 'Bengal Spice', and a hair salon 'Ro Ko Ko'. The local secondary school is Sandringham School.

== Governance ==
Jersey Farm has its own Residents Association (JFRA) which arranges a number of yearly events such as a Fireworks display and Christmas Party for the children of Jersey Farm. Members of the Jersey Farm Residents Association are also provided with a quarterly newsletter, detailing community news and events.

== Culture ==
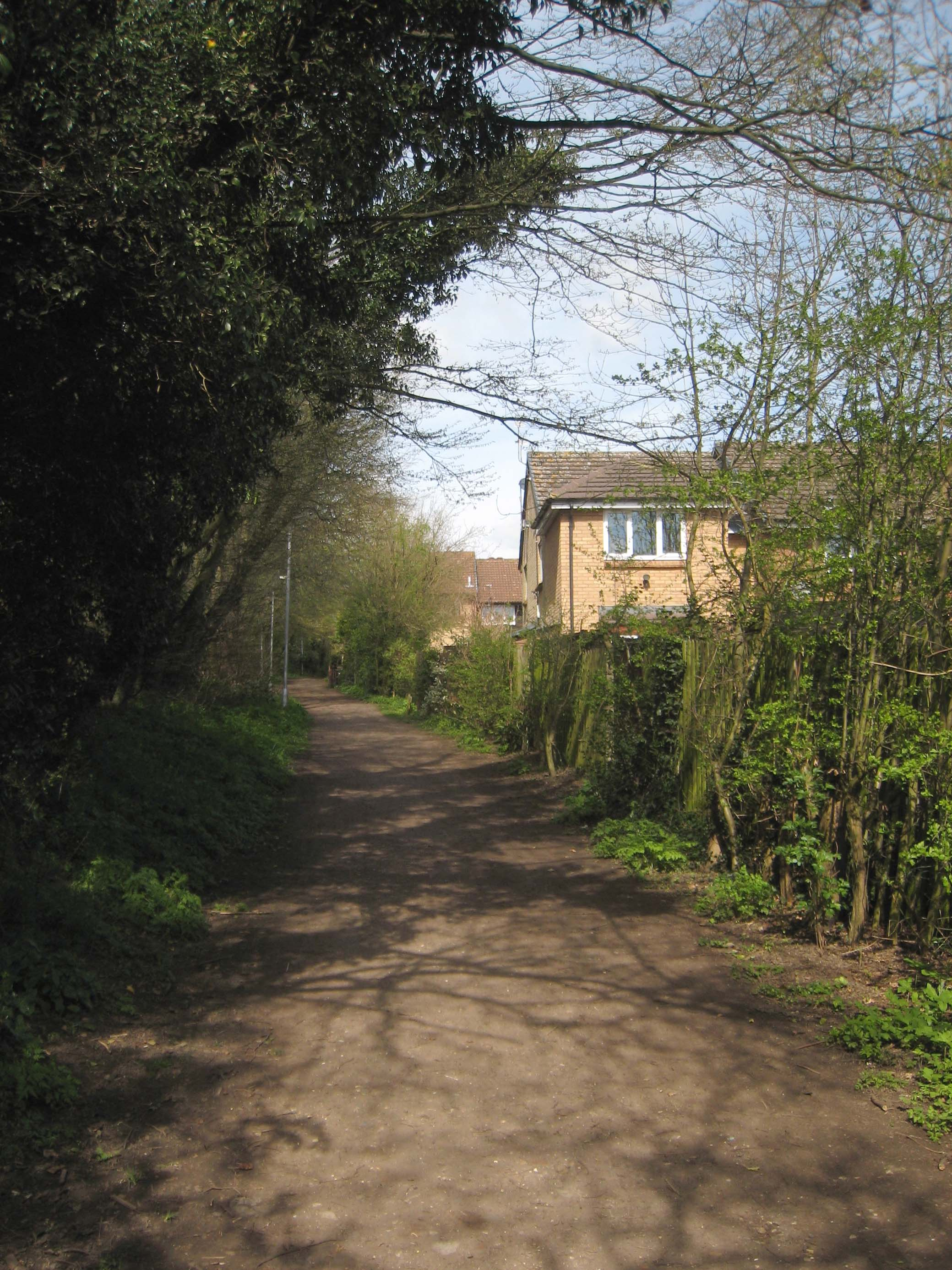
Jersey Lane

The pub used a local competition to name it, "Blackberry Jack" being the winning entry. According to the entry Blackberry Jack was a local tramp who lived in "camps" in the blackberry bushes around the local fields. In fact his name was Bill or William; he never told anyone his last name. He was known to travel to London and north to Norfolk. "Jack" or John was another tramp who had the same white coat and spent most of the time drunk between St Albans and Borehamwood.

Jersey Farm hosts a weekly parkrun, one of only three on the UK mainland beginning with the letter J so attracts many parkrun tourists doing the alphabet challenge.
