= Potters Crouch =

Hamlet in Hertfordshire, England

Coordinates: 51°44′05″N 00°23′03″W

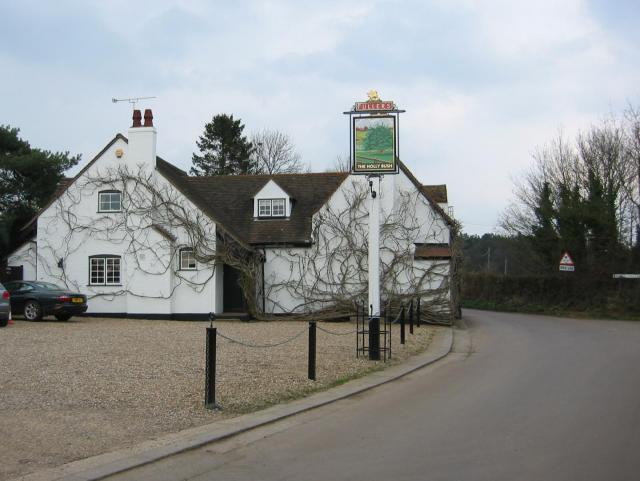
- The 'Holly Bush' at Potters Crouch

- Location within Hertfordshire
- OS grid reference: TL114052
- Civil parish: St Michael
- District: St Albans
- Shire county: Hertfordshire
- Region: East
- Country: England
- Sovereign state: United Kingdom
- Post town: ST ALBANS
- Postcode district: AL2
- Dialling code: 01727
- Police: Hertfordshire
- Fire: Hertfordshire
- Ambulance: East of England
- UK Parliament: Harpenden and Berkhamsted

Potters Crouch is a small hamlet in Hertfordshire, England, south-west of St Albans near Chiswell Green. It is in the civil parish of St Michael.

== History ==
It is believed by historians that the area around Potters Crouch was originally a part of the Roman Britain town of Verulamium following evidence of 1st century AD Roman debris being found in the area. The name of Potters Crouch is believed to have originated in the 13th century as the home of a potter working in the area. It is speculated that this potter was Richard Le Pottere, who was succeeded by his son William Pottere in the trade. In 1344, it was referred to as Le Pottercrouch. The village was originally owned by the Earls of Verulam until 1931 when it was handed over to The Crown and managed as part of The Crown Estates.

Since 1977, Potters Crouch and its surrounding area was formally designated a conservation area by St Albans City and District council. The village is served by the M1 motorway. In 2012, it was revealed that Potters Crouch had a problem with water pressure following a fire in the same year whereby the Hertfordshire Fire and Rescue Service required use of the local water supply, which led to a lower quality of water services provided to local houses.

== Pub ==
Potters Crouch has a pub, the Holly Bush, which was constructed in the 17th century. It became a grade II listed building in 1981. The pub has been featured in the Good Pub Guide several times as well as in other pub guides, which have also promoted visiting Potters Crouch.
