= Childwickbury =

Hamlet in Hertfordshire, England

Coordinates: 51°47′N 0°21′W

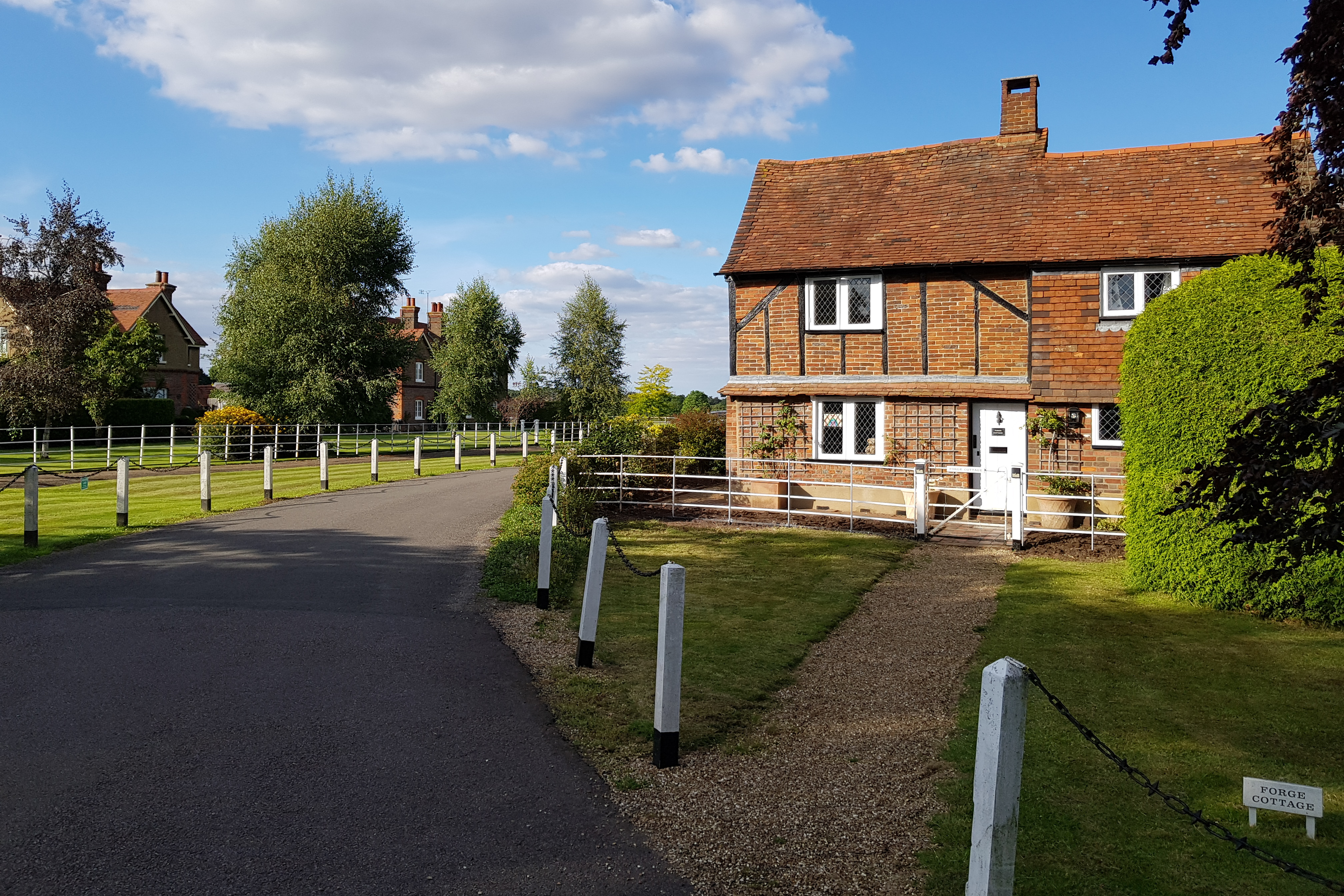
- Childwickbury

- Location within Hertfordshire
- Civil parish: St Michael
- District: St Albans
- Shire county: Hertfordshire
- Region: East
- Country: England
- Sovereign state: United Kingdom
- Post town: St Albans
- Postcode district: AL3
- Police: Hertfordshire
- Fire: Hertfordshire
- Ambulance: East of England
- UK Parliament: Harpenden and Berkhamsted

Childwickbury is a hamlet in Hertfordshire, England, lying to the north of St Albans in the parish of St Michael.

Childwickbury Manor was home to Stanley Kubrick from 1978 until his death in 1999.

Many of the buildings in Childwickbury are listed, including the well on the Green.
