= Verulam School =

Secondary school in St Albans City, Hertfordshire, England

- School badge used from before September 2021

Location
- Brampton Road; St Albans, Hertfordshire, AL1 4PR; England; 51°45′19″N 0°18′58″W

Information
- School type: 11–18 converter academy
- Motto: Faire Mon Devoir (French: "To do my duty")
- Established: 1938
- Founder: R. F. Bradshaw
- Local authority: Hertfordshire
- Trust: Ambition Education Trust
- Department for Education URN: 137038 Tables
- Ofsted: Reports
- Head teacher: Fergal Moane (Since 2024)
- Staff: 107
- Gender of entry: Boys (with girls allowed in the sixth form)
- Age range: 11 to 18
- Enrolment: 1066 pupils (28 November 2023)
- Houses: Brampton, Churchill, Hamilton, Jennings, Park, York
- Colours: Blue and gold
- Publication: Verulam Vox, Spotlight On, end of term Newsletter
- Website: www.verulamschool.co.uk

Verulam School is an 11–18 boys state–funded secondary school with academy status in St Albans, Hertfordshire, England, founded in 1938 as St Albans Boys' Modern School.

The name was changed in the 1940s to St Albans Grammar School for Boys and in 1975 to Verulam School, based on the Roman name for St Albans (Verulamium).

== Background ==
The school caters for boys between the ages of 11 and 18. Boys can stay on into the Sixth Form, which provides provision for both male and female students from other schools.

The school works in partnership with two neighbouring schools, Sandringham School and Beaumont School, to enhance post-16 educational provision. The partnership, named 'BeauSandVer', enables students to travel between schools for A Level subjects.

== Overview ==
=== School performance ===
A Herts for Learning review in January 2018 rated the school 'Good' and highlighted improvements in the areas criticised by an Ofsted inspection in 2017. A further inspection by Ofsted in July 2018 reached the conclusion that Safeguarding is effective and noted that the school had responded to the October inspection "with great urgency". In September 2018 the school joined the Alban Academy Trust. An Ofsted inspection in October 2018 judged the school to be Good.

In a Kirkland Rowell independent survey of Parents in February 2020, 89% of parents said they would recommend the school.

=== Houses ===
There are a total of six houses at the school ― Brampton, Churchill, Hamilton, Jennings, Park and York. Until 1975, Verulam School had four names, with their names originating from the streets near the school ― Brampton, Hamilton, Jennings and Park. By 1975, the school became a comprehensive school, and given its increase in enrolment numbers, an additional two houses were added ― York and Churchill, also named after nearby streets.

=== Early history ===
The school first opened as St Albans Boys’ Modern on 26 April 1938. This was an unusual time in the academic year for such an event, a fact that probably helped to account for the small number of entries. Only 54 boys mustered in the hall for the first assembly which was attended by the Chairman of the Governors. Mr. E L Hadfield M.A. J.P. C.C. and by others concerned in the inauguration of the School. The School's foundation was due to a realisation that there was insufficient provision of secondary education in certain areas of the county Consequently over a relatively short period, four new schools were established by the Hertfordshire Education Committee, the first at East Barnet, two simultaneously at Cheshunt and St Albans and lastly at Welwyn Garden City.

== Alumni ==
- Colin Blunstone (b. 1945) pop singer and songwriter, member of The Zombies pop group
- Jez Butterworth (b. 1969) playwright, film-script writer and film director
- Mike Chaplin (1943 - 2026), artist
- Ernest Gellner (1925-1995) philosopher and theorist of nationalism
- Hayley Ladd (b. 1993) professional footballer
- Steve Reed (born 1963), politician
- Peter Rehberg (1968-2021) electronic musician, founder of the Mego (label)
- John Sessions (1953-2020) British actor and comedian
- Geoff Shreeves (b. 1964) footballer commentator
- Luke Turner (b.1978), writer. The school has appeared in Turner's writing.
- Chris White (b. 1943) pop singer, songwriter and bass guitarist, member of The Zombies pop group
