= Thirsk School and Sixth Form College =

Location
- Topcliffe Road; Sowerby; Thirsk, North Yorkshire, YO7 1RZ; England
- Coordinates: 54.223910°N 1.346920°W

Information
- Type: Community school
- Motto: 'Victor Qui Laborat' (Victory to he who toils)
- Established: 1957
- Local authority: North Yorkshire Council
- Department for Education URN: 121666 Tables
- Ofsted: Reports
- Chair: Nick Horn
- Head teacher: Emma Lambden
- Age: 11 to 18
- Enrolment: 944
- Newspaper: The Falcon
- Website: www.thirskschool.org

Thirsk School and Sixth Form College is a secondary school in Sowerby, a village adjoining Thirsk, North Yorkshire, England. It was established in 1957 as Thirsk Grammar and Modern School. It has nearly 1,200 pupils, including about 200 in the sixth form. Offering education to 11-year-olds up to 18-year-olds.

== School performance ==
In 2012, an Ofsted inspection rated Thirsk School as Grade 2 (good) for all areas and overall effectiveness. As of 2025, the most recent inspection was in 2022.

In 2019, the proportion of pupils entering the English Baccalaureate was 67%, considerably above the average for North Yorkshire and England. The proportion achieving Grade 5 or above in English and maths GCSEs was 38%, considerably below the average for North Yorkshire and for England. The Attainment 8 score was in line with the average for North Yorkshire and for England.

The average A Level grade in 2019 was C, compared to an average of C+ in North Yorkshire and England. The A Level progress score was below average.

== Extracurricular activities ==
Extracurricular activities include the school's newspaper, The Falcon. Under the previous name of T.S. Times, the school paper was named the best secondary school newspaper in the country in a competition run by First News.

== Notable former pupils ==
- Ben Coad, cricketer
- Alfie McCalmont, Northern Irish footballer
- John Rankin Waddell, photographer
