= Jefferson Hack =

British publisher

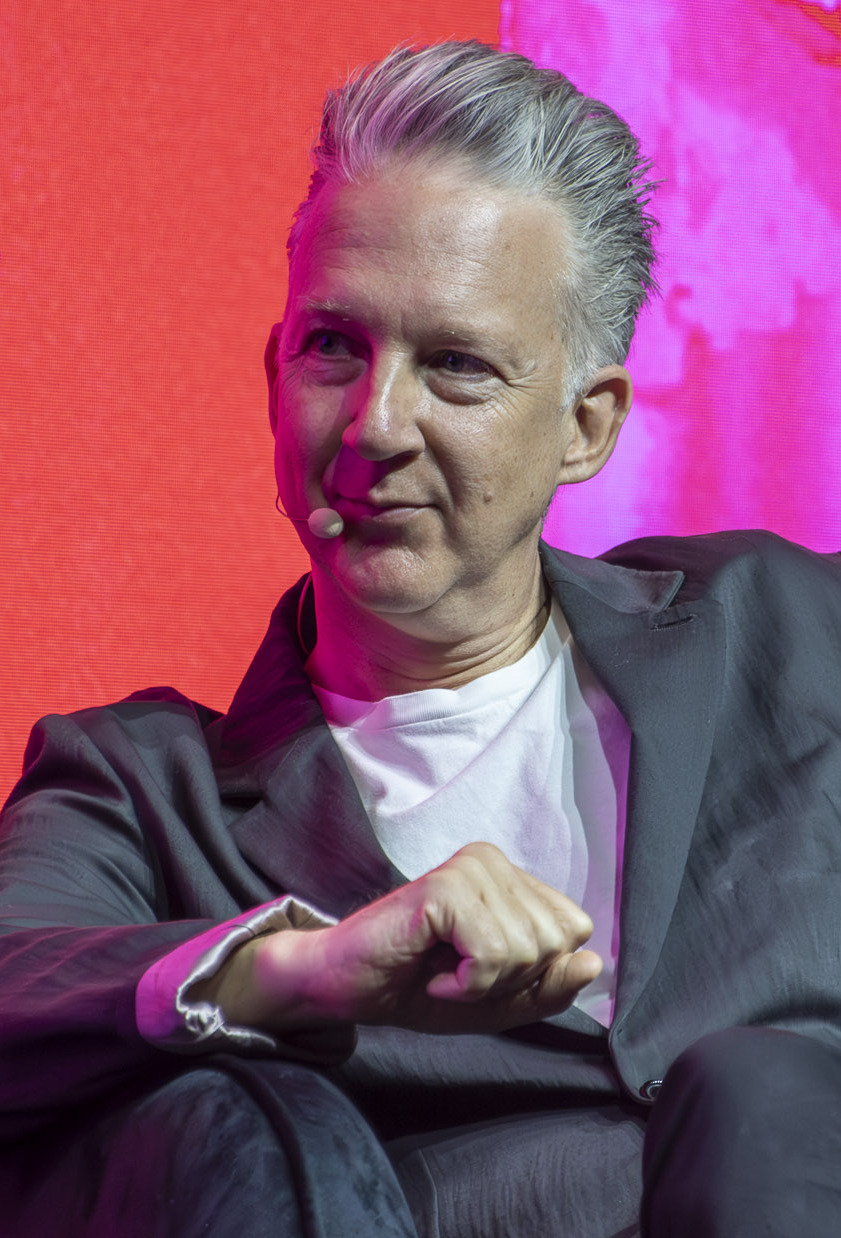
- Hack in 2025
- Born: 20 June 1971 (age 55); Montevideo, Uruguay
- Education: University of the Arts London
- Occupation: Publisher
- Title: Co-founder and CEO of Dazed Media
- Spouse: Anna Cleveland (m. 2023)
- Partner: Kate Moss (2001–2003)
- Children: 2, including Lila Moss
- Website: jeffersonhack.com

Jefferson Hack (born 20 June 1971) is a British curator and creative director. He is the co-founder, editorial director and CEO of Dazed Media, an independent media company that produces content across print, digital and video brands. The company's portfolio includes fashion bi-annuals Another Magazine and Another Man; quarterly youth fashion and culture magazine Dazed, and websites Anothermag.com, Dazeddigital.com, Dazedbeauty.com and Anothermanmag.com in addition to the creative wing Dazed Studio. Hack, who previously served as Editor of these titles, is also co-founder of global video channel Nowness.

== Early life and career ==
Hack was born to British parents in Montevideo, Uruguay, and lived for much of his childhood and teenage years in Cliffsend, Kent.

In 1991, at the age of 19, Hack founded Dazed with photographer Rankin while a student at London College of Printing. In 2001 Hack launched luxury bi-annual Another Magazine. In 2005 Hack co-founded men's style bi-annual Another Man.

In 2006 Hack launched dazeddigital.com, in 2009 he launched anothermag.com, and in 2017 he launched anothermanmag.com.

In 2010 Hack co-founded Nowness, an independent luxury lifestyle video channel in partnership with LVMH Moët Hennessy Louis Vuitton. In 2017 Dazed Media and Modern Media formed a joint venture titled Modern Dazed and acquired a majority stake in Nowness.

In 2013, Hack launched Dazed Studio, the creative agency wing of Dazed Media, which makes digital, video, print, events and social media for brands, Dazed & Confused was rebranded as Dazed in spring 2014.

In 2022, Hack was honoured at The Fashion Awards 2022, receiving the Special Recognition Award for Cultural Curation for empowering youth through creativity and for creating countless opportunities for next generation creatives working across fashion, design, art, music and more, providing a platform and supporting emerging talent.

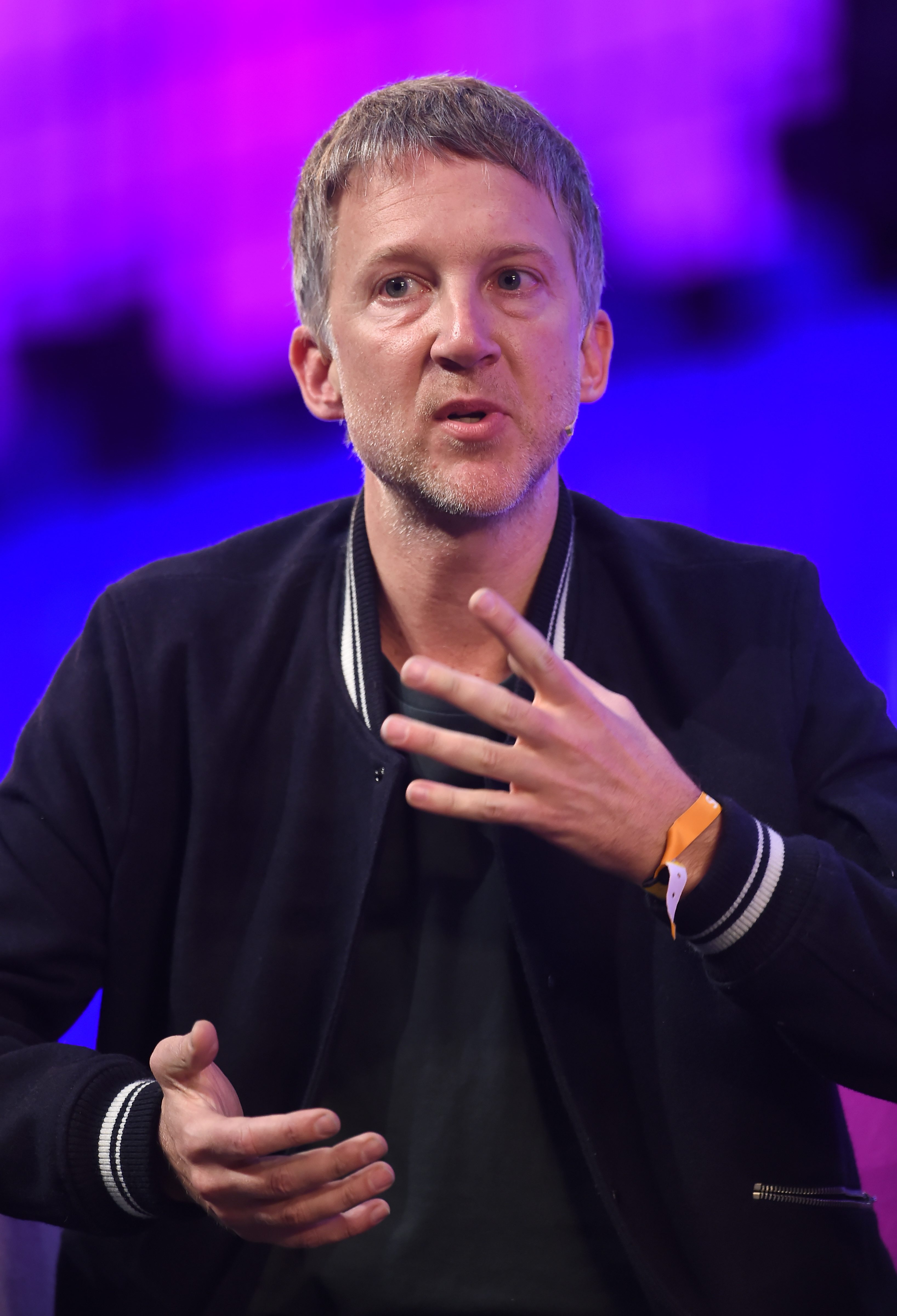
Hack in 2015

== Personal life ==
Hack was in a relationship with model Kate Moss in the early 2000s. Together they have a daughter, Lila Moss (born Lila Grace Moss Hack) born in 2002. He lives in East London. In July 2023 he married Anna Cleveland, daughter of model Pat Cleveland. They have a son, Presley Phoenix Hack, born 20 April 2025.

== Books ==
- Star Culture, The “Dazed and Confused” Collected Interviews. By Mark Sanders and Hack. Phaidon Press, 2000. ISBN 0714839558.
- RankinWorks. By Kate Moss, Oliviero Toscani, Liz Farrelly, and Hack. Booth-Clibborn, 2002. ISBN 1861541619.
- Another Fashion Book. By Hack. Steidl, 2009. ISBN 386521729X.
- Another Art Book. By Hack. Steidl, 2011. ISBN 3865218601.
- Dazed and Confused: Making It Up As We Go Along. By Ingrid Sischy and Hack, Rankin and Jo-Ann Furniss. Rizzoli, 2012. ISBN 0847836924.
- Kate: The Kate Moss Book. By Kate Moss, Fabien Baron, Jess Hallett, and Hack. Rizzoli, 2012. ISBN 0847837904.
- Another Man: Men's Style Stories. By Alister Mackie, Hack, Ben Cobb. Rizzoli, 2014. ISBN 9780847843275.
- We Can’t Do this Alone: Jefferson Hack the System By Hack. Rizzoli, 2016. ISBN 978-0847847433.
