= Frogmore, Hertfordshire =

Village in Hertfordshire, England

Coordinates: 51.718°N 0.328°W

Frogmore
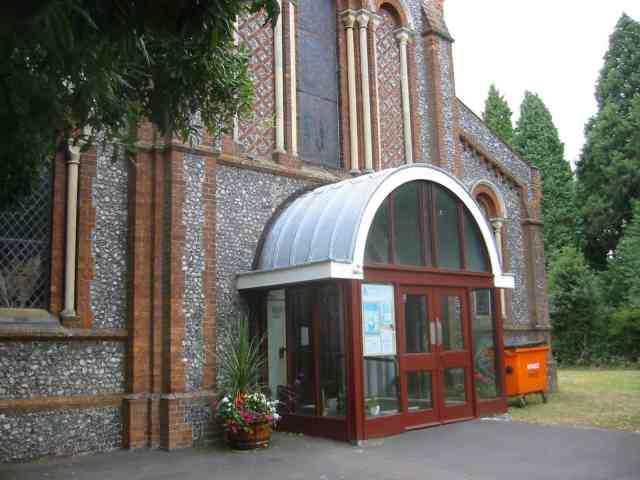
- Holy Trinity Church by George Gilbert Scott and William Moffatt

- Location within Hertfordshire
- Population: 800 (2001 census estimate based on buildings shown on the Ordnance Survey here within St Stephen parish)
- OS grid reference: TL155034
- Civil parish: St Stephen
- District: St Albans
- Shire county: Hertfordshire
- Region: East
- Country: England
- Sovereign state: United Kingdom
- Post town: ST ALBANS
- Postcode district: AL2
- Dialling code: 01727
- Police: Hertfordshire
- Fire: Hertfordshire
- Ambulance: East of England
- UK Parliament: St Albans

Frogmore is a village 3 miles (4.8 km) north of Radlett in Hertfordshire, and 2 miles (3.2 km) south of St Albans city centre (though in said city's contiguous built-up area). It is located in St Stephen civil parish, within the City and District of St Albans, and the county of Hertfordshire.

It includes the 19th century Holy Trinity church designed by Sir George Gilbert Scott, and Moor Mill featuring two water wheels, (not to be confused with Henry Fourdrinier's Frogmore Paper Mill in Apsley, Hemel Hempstead).

== History ==
The village is mentioned in Daniel Paterson's travel guide of 1796, on the route from London to St. Albans.

Granada Publishing, whose imprints included Grafton and Panther Books, were based at Frogmore, until it was sold in 1983.

The Park Street and Frogmore Society "was formed to promote interest in local history and nature conservation and covers the three villages of Park Street, Frogmore and Colney Street".

Frogmore Cricket Club plays in Park Street.
