= Nowness =

Digital video channel

Nowness, LLC
- Official logo of Nowness
- Website type: Video
- Available in: English
- Founded: February 2010
- Headquarters: London, United Kingdom
- Owner: Modern Dazed
- Industry: Media
- Website: www.nowness.com
- Registration: Optional
- Current status: Active

Nowness (stylized NOWNESS) is a digital video channel that was launched in 2010 by its founder Jefferson Hack as a brand of LVMH Moët Hennessy Louis Vuitton SE. In May 2017, Modern Dazed, a new joint venture between Chinese publisher Modern Media and the UK's Dazed Media, acquired a majority stake in Nowness.

== History ==
Nowness launched in 2010. Its founder and chief creative executive is Jefferson Hack

== Awards ==
- 2011 Webby Award: Best Fashion Website
- 2013 Lovie Award: Best Interactive Video (Ballroom Battle)
- 2013 Lovie Award: Best Lifestyle Website
- 2014 Berlin Fashion Film Festival Award: Best Visual Effects (for shoppable fashion short, "Mine All Mine")
- 2014 Webby Award: Best Cultural Website
- 2017 Webby Award: Best Cultural Website
