= Lila Moss =

English model (born 2002)

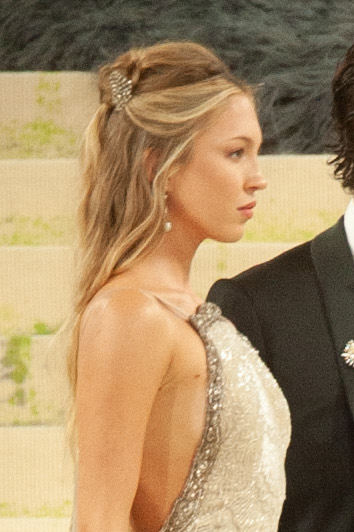
- Moss at the 2026 Met Gala
- Born: Lila Grace Moss Hack; 29 September 2002 (age 24); London, England
- Education: Parsons School of Design
- Occupation: Fashion model
- Years active: 2016–present
- Parents: Jefferson Hack (father); Kate Moss (mother)
- Modelling information
- Height: 5 ft 6 in (1.68 m)
- Hair colour: Blonde
- Eye colour: Green
- Agency: Kate Moss Agency

Lila Grace Moss Hack (born 29 September 2002) is an English fashion model. She made her runway debut in 2021 walking for Miu Miu at Paris Fashion Week. She has appeared in on the covers of British Vogue, Vogue Hong Kong, Vogue Japan and Vogue España.

== Early life ==
Lila Moss was born in London, United Kingdom. She is the daughter of model Kate Moss and magazine editor Jefferson Hack, who co-founded Dazed. Her parents split up shortly after her birth. She attended the Parsons School of Design in New York.

== Career ==
In 2016, she appeared on the cover of Vogue Italia along with her mother. She modelled for Marc Jacobs Beauty in 2018 where she was announced the new face of the brand. She had her first solo magazine cover for Dazed that year, and was featured in Miu Miu's SS20 campaign.

Moss was nominated for Model of the Year by Models.com in 2020 and 2021. She made her runway debut at Paris Fashion Week in 2021 for Miu Miu. Also in 2021, she appeared on the cover of Vogue Japan, Vogue Hong Kong and British Vogue.

In 2022, she was nominated for Model of the Year at the Fashion Awards. In 2023, she appeared on the cover of British Vogue and Vanity Fair. In 2024, she appeared on a British Vogue cover titled "40 Vogue icons" and in Vogue España. She also appeared on the Victoria's Secret "The Tour" show and also for the campaign.

In July 2025, Mattel collaborated with Moss to create a one-of-a-kind Barbie doll in her likeness that included a continuous glucose monitor, insulin pump, and personal diabetes manager device. The doll was launched alongside a mainline Barbie with type 1 diabetes, created in partnership with Breakthrough T1D, to which Mattel donated £20,000 in Moss's name.

== Personal life ==
Moss has type 1 diabetes, which she was diagnosed with at age eight. She uses an insulin pump to manage the condition.
