= Beaumont School, St Albans =

Beaumont School
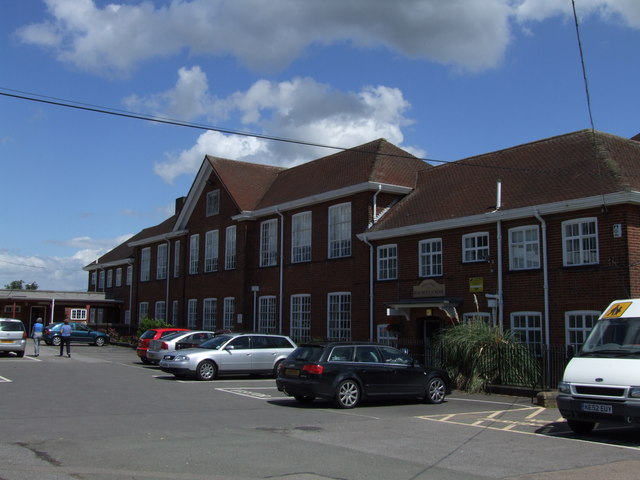

Location
- Oakwood Drive; St Albans, Hertfordshire, AL4 0XB; England; 51°45′19″N 0°17′56″W

Information
- Type: Academy
- Motto: Enjoy and Excel
- Established: 1938
- Department for Education URN: 138286 Tables
- Ofsted: Reports
- Headteacher: Martin Atkinson
- Staff: 208 (2022-2023)
- Gender: Coeducational
- Age: 11 to 19
- Enrolment: 1600 (500 in sixth form)
- Houses: Butler; Luther-King; Elgar; Austen; Redgrave; Newton; Seacole; Turing
- Colours: Black, Maroon and Gold
- Publication: Beaumont Life (monthly)
- Website: http://www.beaumontschool.com

Beaumont School is a coeducational secondary school and sixth form with academy status, located in St Albans, Hertfordshire, England. It was founded in 1938 and has become a school of over 1600 students, including 500 in the sixth form. It is situated to the east of St Albans in Hertfordshire and is within access of the city centre.

In 2003 it achieved a Language College status and in 2007, having been identified as a High Performing Specialist School, Beaumont was then able to obtain a second specialism as a Maths and Computing College. In 2007 Beaumont achieved the International Award from the British Council and offered the International Baccalaureate as an alternative to A-levels; as of 2011 the IB is no longer offered at Beaumont school. A December 2008 Ofsted inspection accorded the school a Grade 2 (good), whilst the sixth form achieved an outstanding rating. The school converted to academy status on 1 July 2012. In 2014 Ofsted awarded Beaumont an Outstanding rating following a full inspection.

== History ==
The school was founded in 1938, at around the same time as much of the neighbouring residential area was built. The school takes its name from Beaumonts Manor (later Beaumonts Farm), a manor house whose land once encompassed much of the surrounding area.

== Forms and Houses ==
In September 2009, the school introduced a system of six houses with a form in every year, one for each of the letters of the word "L E A R N S". Students were able to vote for the names of the Houses, resulting up in the following: Luther King, Elgar, Austen, Redgrave, Newton and Seacole. As of 2018, a new letter was added, resulting in the word "B L E A R N S", the letter "B" standing for "Butler", representing the feminist and social reformer Josephine Butler. In the school year of 2022–2023, a new house was introduced, called Turing, named after the mathematician and computer scientist Alan Turing. Consequently, the letter "T" was added, forming the new acronym "B L E A R N S T".

Interform competitions between year group forms are encouraged and take place regularly; testing a variety of skills including sports competitions, science challenges and drama performances. This allows all pupils to demonstrate their different abilities.

== BeauSandVer Education Trust ==
The school works in partnership with two neighbouring schools via a consortium, to enhance post-16 educational provision. In 2016, the three schools launched the BeauSandVer Education Trust which consists of Sandringham School, Verulam School and Beaumont School. Students travel between schools using the consortium bus service, with students able to study A level, BTEC, and CTEC courses at multiple schools, allowing access to a broader curriculum. In the 2020-2021 school year, the combined sixth form reached 1000 current students.
