= Sandridge =

Coordinates: 51.78084°N 0.30384°W

- Village
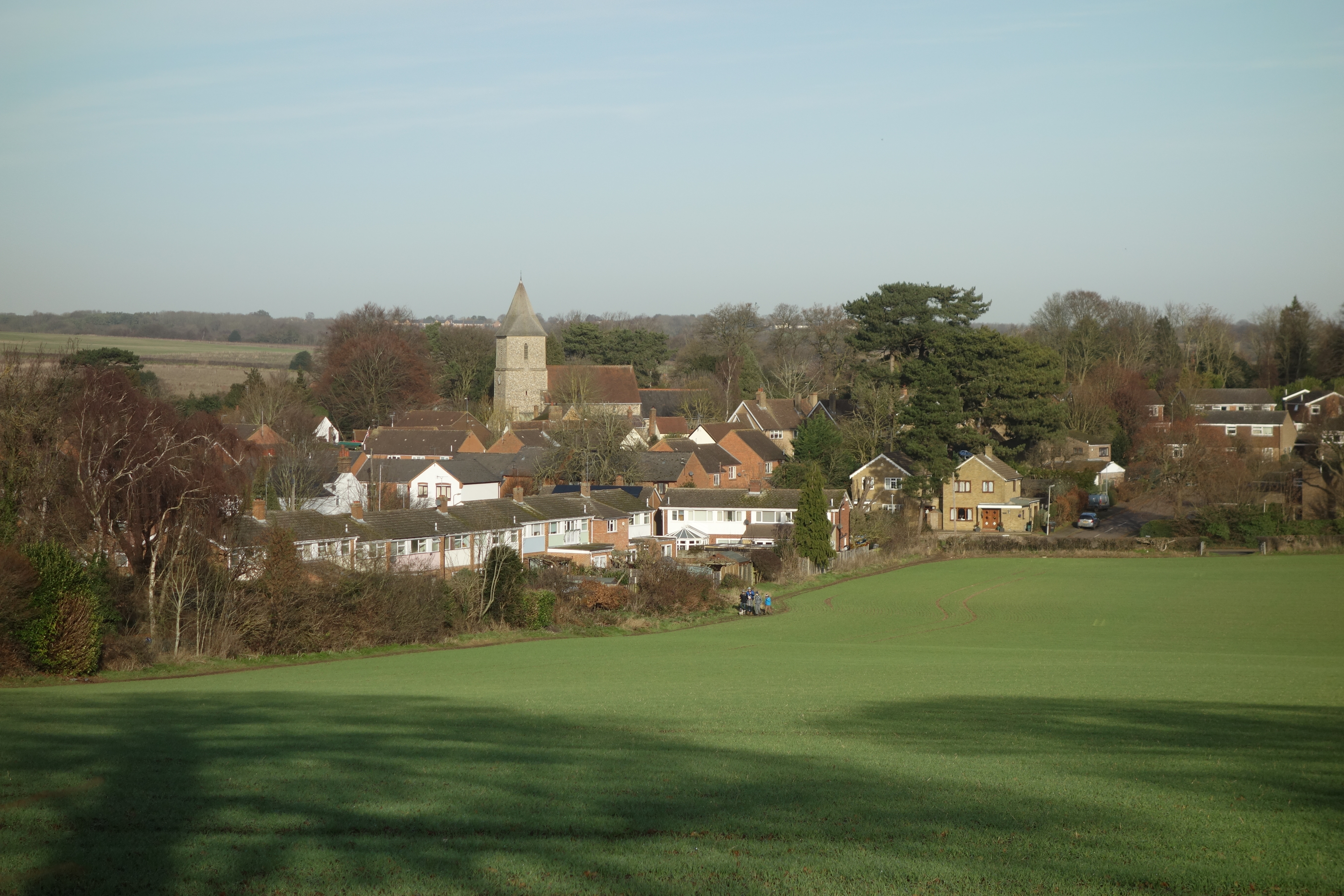
- The centre of Sandridge seen from the south

- Location within Hertfordshire
- Area: 5.86 sq mi (15.2 km^{2})
- Population: 11,919 (2021)
  - Density: 2,034/sq mi (785/km^{2})
- OS grid reference: TL175105
- Civil parish: Sandridge
- District: St Albans
- Shire county: Hertfordshire
- Region: East
- Country: England
- Sovereign state: United Kingdom
- Post town: ST ALBANS
- Postcode district: AL4
- Police: Hertfordshire
- Fire: Hertfordshire
- Ambulance: East of England
- UK Parliament: Harpenden and Berkhamsted
- Website: Sandridge Parish Council

Sandridge is a village and civil parish between the city centre of St Albans (2.5 miles (4.0 km) to the south-west) and Wheathampstead, in the St Albans district, in Hertfordshire, England, forming part of the contiguous built-up area of St Albans.

== History ==
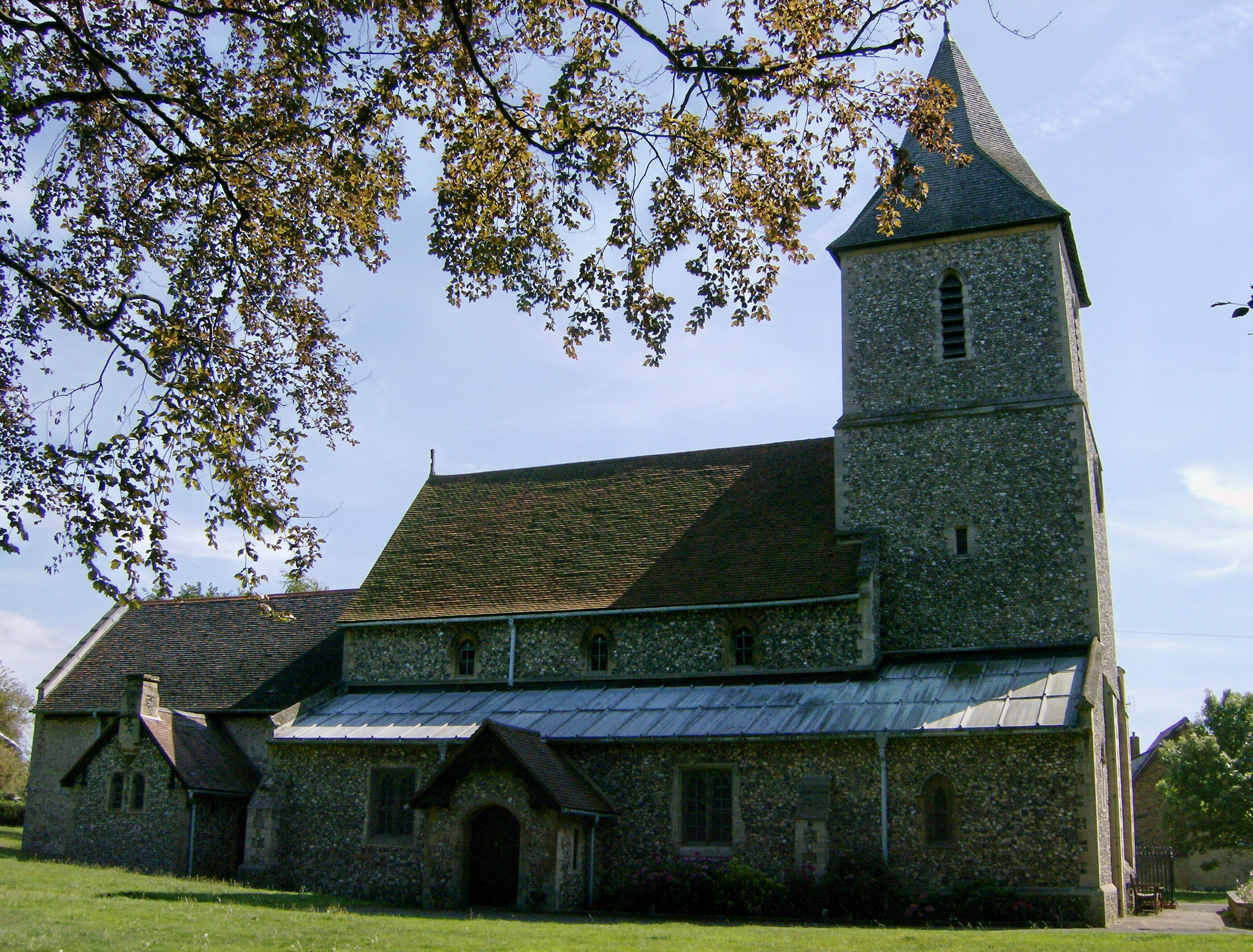
St Leonard's parish church

The original name was "Saundruage" meaning a place of sandy soil serviced by bond tenants.

The earliest recorded mention of Sandridge is in the year 796 the parish being part of the revenue of the Mercian Kings. It was given by Egfrith son of Offa in the first year of his reign to abbot Eadric second abbot of St Alban's Monastery and to the monks of St Albans.

Part of the parish of Sandridge was added to the Municipal Borough of St Albans in 1887. The remainder of the parish was renamed Sandridge Rural in 1894 when Sandridge Rural Parish Council was formed. In 1913 a further 241 acres were transferred to St Albans. The parish name reverted to Sandridge in 1957.

== Second Battle of St Albans ==
In February 1461 the final skirmishes of the Second Battle of St Albans took place in and around Sandridge as the Earl of Warwick, for the Yorkists, retreated towards Nomansland.

== Information ==
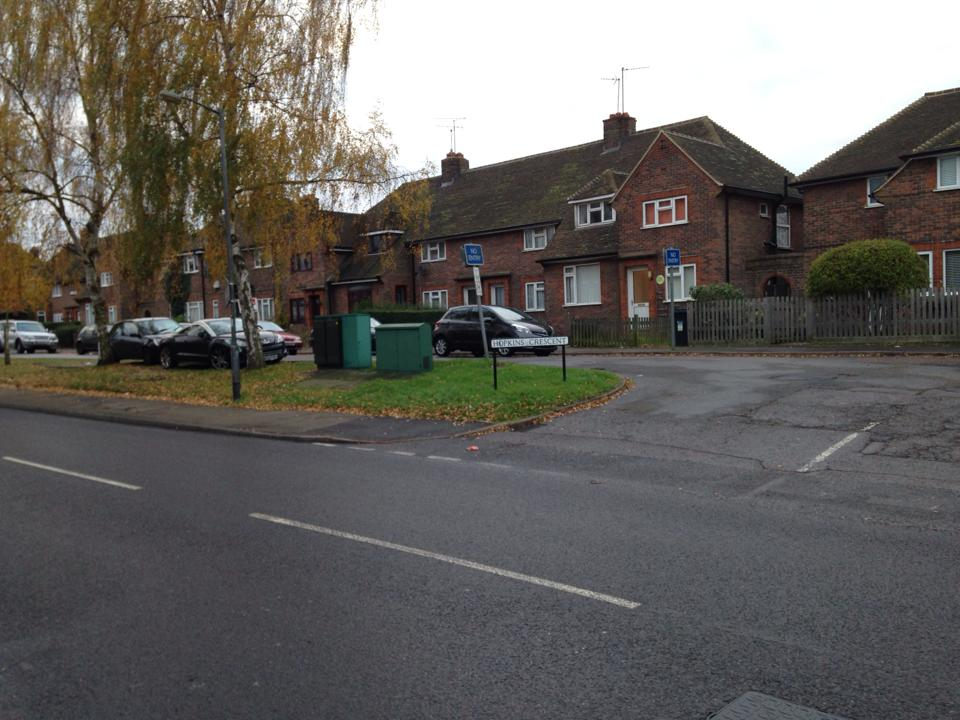
Hopkins Crescent in Sandridge pictured in November 2013.

The population of Sandridge parish at the time of the 2021 census was 11,919. This includes some people living in the Jersey Farm area of St Albans and partly the Marshalswick area.

The village has three pubs: the Green Man, the Rose and Crown and the Queen's Head.

The village church, St Leonard's, is medieval. Its lychgate was built as a memorial to World War I.

It also supports Sandridge Rovers F.C., who play in the Hertfordshire Senior County League.

Sandridge was one of the earlier homes of the great English general, John Churchill, 1st Duke of Marlborough, and his infamous wife, Sarah, a favourite of Queen Anne. The title Baron Sandridge was given to Churchill by James II in 1685, and was his first English peerage title (his earlier title, Baron Eyemouth, had been created in 1682 by James's predecessor, Charles II, in the Peerage of Scotland).

In 1939 the first Second World War secret Wireless Intercept Station was constructed by the GPO at the top of Woodcock Hill. It was the first of a group of stations dedicated to Diplomatic Interception with rows of radio operators listening to the wireless traffic between Germany, Italy, Tokyo and other enemy embassies around the world. Messages intercepted at Sandridge were sent to Bletchley Park for decryption. The results were vital to Winston Churchill who used the information to make important decisions about the course of the war. After the Second World War it became part of the Diplomatic Wireless Service under GCHQ and in 1973 the site was taken over by the Home Office for police research.

It is home to a small grass airfield to the north, named Coleman Green Airstrip which is used for general aviation.

In 2008 the Woodland Trust announced plans to create a new forest north of Sandridge. The 858 acres (347 hectares) of woodland are now called Heartwood Forest. The forest surrounds the north and northwest of the parish.
