= Sandridge Rovers F.C. =

Association football club in England

Coordinates: 51°46′48.08″N 0°18′30.67″W

Sandridge Rovers
- Full name: Sandridge Rovers Football Club
- Nickname: The Ridge
- Founded: 1896
- Ground: Spencer Recreation Ground, Sandridge
- Chairman: Marc Andrews
- Manager: Chris Wickens/Marc Andrews
- League: Herts County League Division One
- 2024–25: Herts County League Division One, 6th of 16
Home colours	Away colours

Sandridge Rovers Football Club is an English football club based in Sandridge, Hertfordshire. They currently compete in the Herts County League Division One and play their home matches at the Spencer Recreation Ground. The club is affiliated to the Hertfordshire Football Association.

== History ==
Sandridge Rovers Football Club was formed in 1896 and were members of the Mid Herts League for several decades. Changing facilities were spartan with the club sharing the old pavilion with the cricket club. Subsequently, teams changed in the rear room of the Village Hall which had just one shower until the formation of the Sandridge Youth and Sports Community Association which enabled the present day facilities to be built in 1967. With the new facilities in place the club were able to be elected to the Herts County League in 1967. Division Two was won in the first season and Division One in the second, which meant that the club started the 1969–70 season in the Premier Division, where the first team has been ever since.

The Premier Division has been won four times – in 1981–82 and 1982–83 under Doug Parkin, in 1987–88 under Alan King and in 1994–95 when Nigel Tester was manager. The prestigious Aubrey Cup in which the club first played in 1967–68 has never been won, with just two appearances in the final – losing by 2–1 to London Colney in 1982 and by 1–0 to Oxhey Jets in 2003. The only County Cup success has been the Intermediate Cup in 1981–82.

== Ground ==
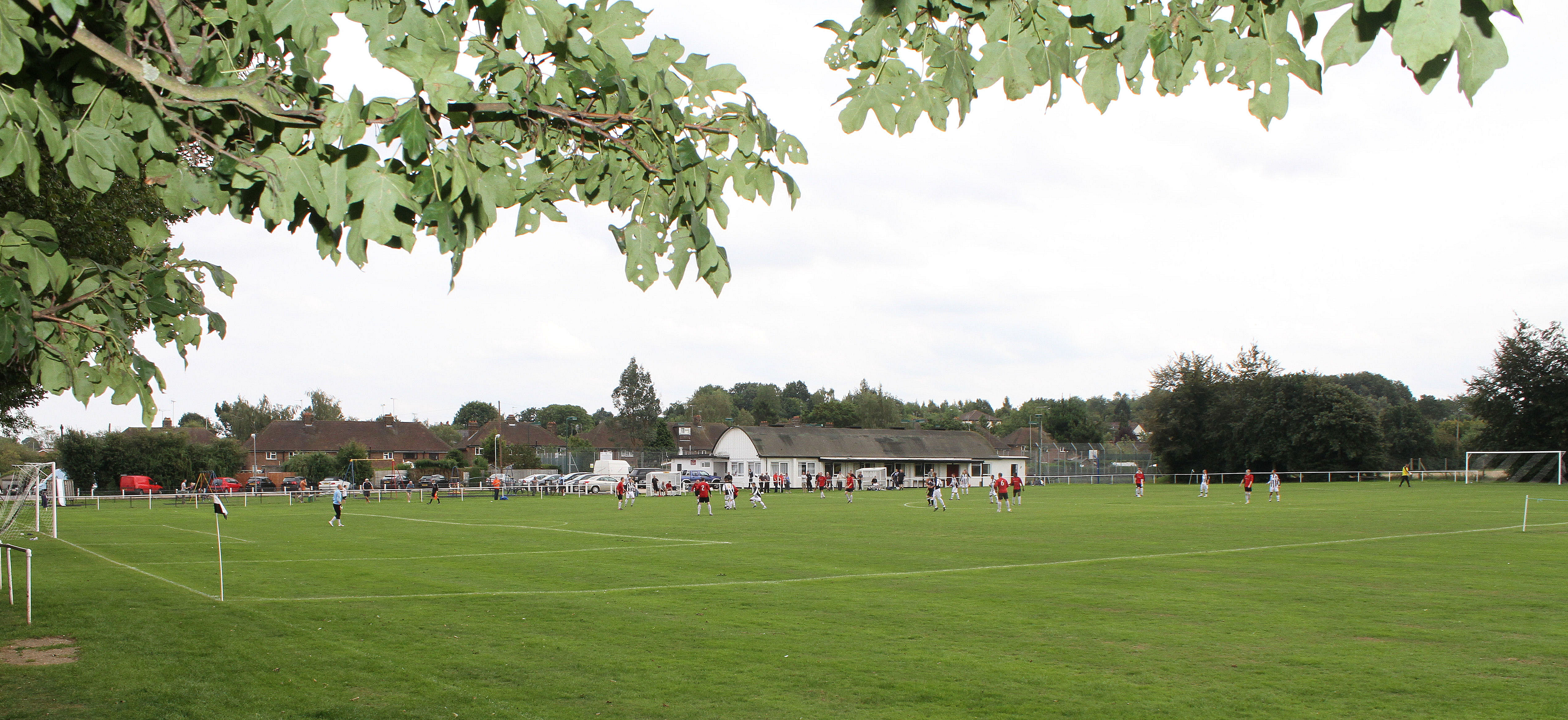
Spencer Recreation Ground

Sandridge Rovers play their home matches at the Spencer Recreation Ground in Sandridge, Hertfordshire. They share the facilities with Sandridge Cricket Club.

== Committee ==
- President – Graham Hardwick
- Chairman – Marc Andrews
- Historian – Graham Hardwick
- Secretary – Kate Andrews
- Treasurer – Kate Andrews
- Managers – Chris Wickens/Marc Andrews
- Assistant Managers – Chris Green, James Dolllin,

== Honours ==
- Herts Senior County League Premier Division
  - Champions: 1981–1982, 1982–1983, 1987–1988, 1994–1995
- Herts Senior County League Division One
  - Champions: 1968–1969
- Herts Senior County League Division Two
  - Champions: 1967–1968

== Records ==
- League: 1st (Herts Senior County League Premier Division), 1981–82, 1982–83, 1987–88, 1994–95
- FA Vase: 1st Round, 1987–88
