= Another Magazine =

British fashion magazine

AnOther
- Cover of the Spring/Summer 2021 issue, Kiki Willems by Craig McDean
- Editor-in-Chief: Susannah Frankel
- Categories: Fashion
- Frequency: Bi-annual
- Founder: Jefferson Hack
- Founded: 2001; 25 years ago
- Company: Dazed Media
- Country: United Kingdom
- Based in: London
- Language: English
- Website: anothermag.com
- ISSN: 1355-5901

Another (stylised as AnOther), is a British bi-annual fashion magazine. It has been published in London since its 2001 founding by Jefferson Hack. A men's edition AnOther Man is also in publication, alongside a Chinese edition of the magazine.

== History ==
In 2015, AnOther was the first magazine to have a high definition LED moving cover. In November 2015, Susannah Frankel was appointed to take over the magazine as its editor-in-chief, Frankel had served as fashion features director of AnOther since its launch and had previously contributed to Dazed, Grazia UK, and The Guardian.

In 2016, to celebrate its 15th anniversary AnOther Magazine commissioned holographic artist Rob Munday to create 1,000 limited edition hand-made 3D covers of Karl Lagerfeld.

== Editions ==
Country	Circulation dates	Editor-in-Chief	Start year	End year
United Kingdom (AnOther)	2001–present	Jefferson Hack	2001	2015
United Kingdom (AnOther)	2001–present	Susannah Frankel	2016	present
China (AnOther China)	2026–present	Jeff Lee	2026	present
China (AnOther China)	2026–present	Monica Mong	2026	present
