= Dazed =

British youth culture magazine

- Dazed Spring 2020 cover, featuring Selena Gomez
- Editor-in-Chief: Ted Stansfield
- Fashion Director: Imruh Asha
- Art Director: Gareth Wrighton
- Categories: Fashion, lifestyle
- Frequency: Quarterly
- Publisher: Dazed Media
- Founder: Jefferson Hack; Rankin; Ian C Taylor
- Founded: 1991
- Country: United Kingdom
- Based in: London, England
- Website: www.dazeddigital.com
- ISSN: 0961-9704

Dazed (Dazed & Confused until February 2014) is a quarterly British youth culture magazine founded in 1991. It covers music, fashion, film, art, and literature. Dazed is published by Dazed Media, an independent media group known for producing stories across its print, digital, and video brands. The company's portfolio includes titles Another Magazine, Dazed Beauty and Nowness. The company's newest division, Dazed Studio, creates brand campaigns across the luxury and lifestyle sectors. Based in London, its founding editors are Jefferson Hack and fashion photographer Rankin.

== Background ==
Dazed was begun by Jefferson Hack, Rankin, and Ian C Taylor, while they were studying at London College of Printing (now London College of Communications). Beginning as a black-and-white folded poster the magazine soon turned full colour and was promoted at London club nights. The Norwegian photographer and later Hells Angel Marcel Leliënhof was involved with the magazine in the first editions, as was the stylist Katie Grand.

=== Editors ===
Editor	Start year	End year	Ref.
Jefferson Hack	1991	1999	
Callum McGeoch	1999	2005	
Rod Stanley	2005	2012	
Tim Noakes	2012	2015	
Isabella Burley	2015	2021	
Ibrahim Kamara	2021	2025	
Ted Stansfield	2025	present	

== Dazed Digital ==
Dazeddigital.com launched in November 2006. Its former editor was Anna Cafolla. As of 2021, Ib Kamara was appointed to the position of editor-in-chief, and Lynette Nylander as executive editorial director.

== Dazed Beauty ==
In September 2018, Dazed launched Dazed Beauty, a community platform dedicated to redefining the language and communication of beauty. Its editor-in-chief is Bunney Kinney.

== International editions ==
- Dazed & Confused Japan (2002–2010)
- Dazed & Confused Australia/New Zealand (2006–2007)
- Dazed & Confused Korea (2008–present)
- Dazed China 青春 (2019–2021; 2026–present)
- Dazed MENA (2024–present)

== Editors of international editions ==
Countries	Circulation Dates	Editor-in-Chief	Start year	End year
China (Dazed China 青春)	2019–2021	Wen Zang	2019	
China (Dazed China 青春)	2026–present	Audrey Hu	2026	present
Middle East and North Africa (Dazed MENA)	2024–present	Ahmad Swaid	2024	present
