= AL postcode area =

Postcode area within the United Kingdom

St Albans
- Postcode area
- Location within the United Kingdom
- Coordinates: 51.777°N 0.286°W
- Sovereign state: United Kingdom
- Postcode area: AL
- Postcode area name: St Albans
- Post towns: 5
- Postcode districts: 10
- Postcode sectors: 39
- Postcodes (live): 7,762
- Postcodes (total): 11,325
- Statistics as at May 2020

The AL postcode area, also known as the St Albans postcode area, is a group of ten postcode districts in England, within five post towns. These cover central Hertfordshire, including St Albans, Harpenden, Welwyn, Welwyn Garden City and Hatfield.

Mail for this area is processed at the Home Counties North Mail Centre in Hemel Hempstead, and is delivered from offices at St Albans (Brick Knoll Park AL1), Harpenden (Station Road AL5), and Hatfield (Town Centre AL10). The area covered includes most of the St Albans and Welwyn Hatfield districts, plus the northeastern part of the Dacorum district and very small parts of the Hertsmere, North Hertfordshire and East Hertfordshire districts.

== Coverage ==
The approximate coverage of the postcode districts:

Postcode district	Post town	Coverage	Local authority area(s)
AL1	ST ALBANS	St Albans (centre)	St Albans
AL2	ST ALBANS	St Albans (south), Bricket Wood, Colney Street, Frogmore, London Colney, Napsbury, Park Street, Potters Crouch, Chiswell Green	St Albans, Hertsmere
AL3	ST ALBANS	St Albans (west), Childwickbury, Flamstead, Gorhambury, Markyate, New Greens, Porters Wood, Redbourn, Sandridge	St Albans, Dacorum
AL4	ST ALBANS	St Albans (east), Blackmore End, Colney Heath, Jersey Farm, Marshalswick, Oaklands, Sandridge, Smallford, Tyttenhanger, Wheathampstead	St Albans, Hertsmere, North Hertfordshire
AL5	HARPENDEN	Harpenden, Kinsbourne Green	St Albans
AL6	WELWYN	Welwyn, Ayot St Peter, Ayot St Lawrence, Digswell, Rabley Heath, Tewin	Welwyn Hatfield, East Hertfordshire, North Hertfordshire
AL7	WELWYN GARDEN CITY	Welwyn Garden City (east)	Welwyn Hatfield
AL8	WELWYN GARDEN CITY	Welwyn Garden City (west), Lemsford	Welwyn Hatfield
AL9	HATFIELD	Hatfield (Old Hatfield), Brookmans Park, Essendon, North Mymms, Welham Green	Welwyn Hatfield
AL10	HATFIELD	Hatfield (new town)	Welwyn Hatfield

== Map ==
AL postcode area map, showing postcode districts in red and post towns in grey text, with links to nearby EN, HP, LU, SG and WD postcode areas.

== See also ==
- List of postcode areas in the United Kingdom
- Postcode Address File
