= St Leonard's Church, Sandridge =

Church in Hertfordshire, England

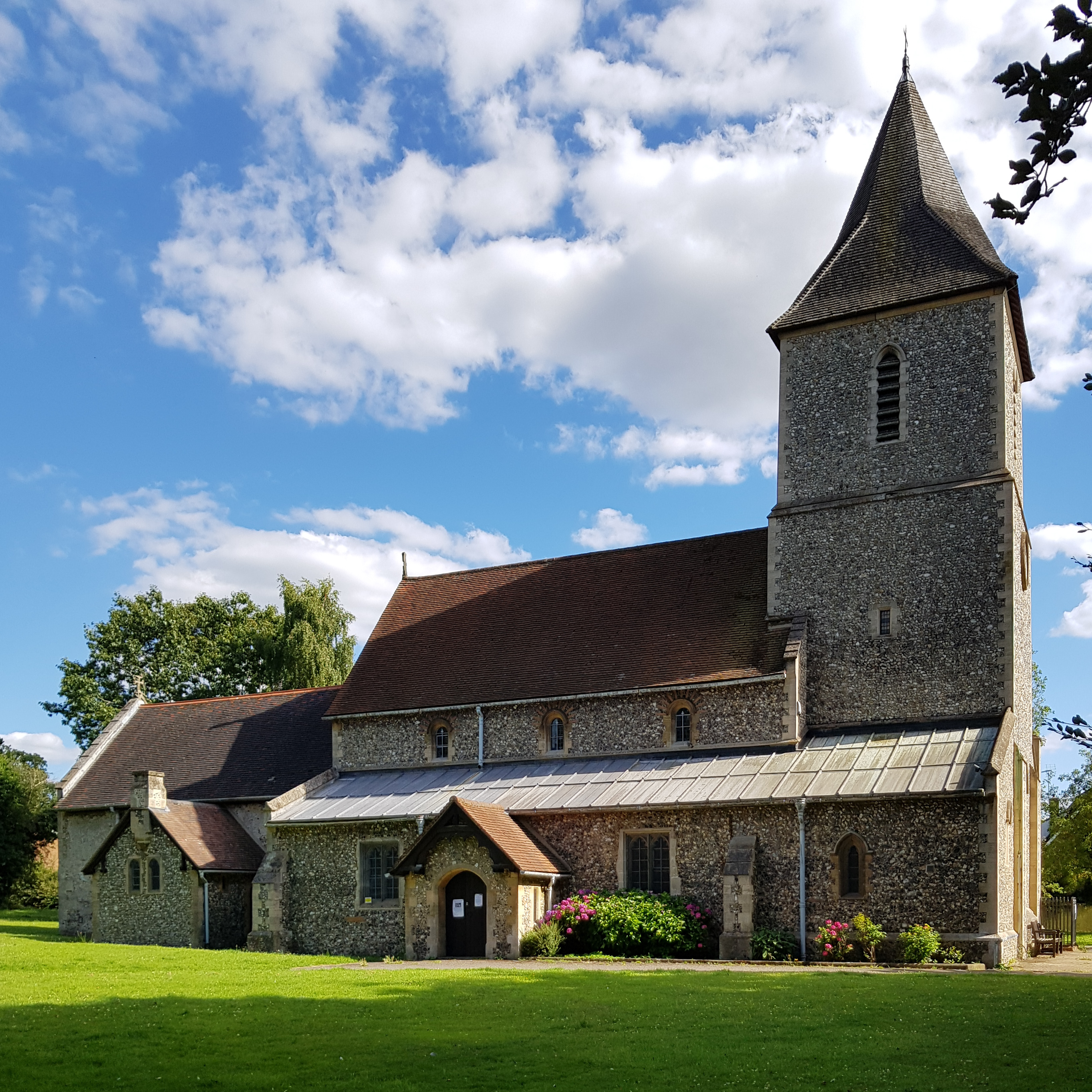
- St Leonard's Church, 2020
- St Leonard's Church, Sandridge
- 51.78140°N 0.30356°W
- Location: Church End, Sandridge, Hertfordshire AL4 9DL
- Denomination: Church of England
- Churchmanship: Broad Church
- Website: https://www.sandridgechurch.org.uk/

History
- Dedication: St. Leonard

Architecture
- Heritage designation: Grade II* listed

Administration
- Province: Canterbury
- Diocese: St Albans
- Deanery: Wheathamstead
- Parish: Sandridge

Clergy
- Rector: Revd Emma (Em) Coley

St Leonard's Church is in Sandridge, a village in Hertfordshire, England. It is an active Anglican parish church. The building is Grade II* listed: notable features include its chancel arch made from recycled Roman brick.

== History ==
Some sort of simple wooden church was probably made necessary in 796 when St Albans Abbey took possession of the Manor of Sandridge. However, the Domesday Book does not mention the existence of a church at Sandridge.

== Chancel arch, possible pre-Norman feature ==
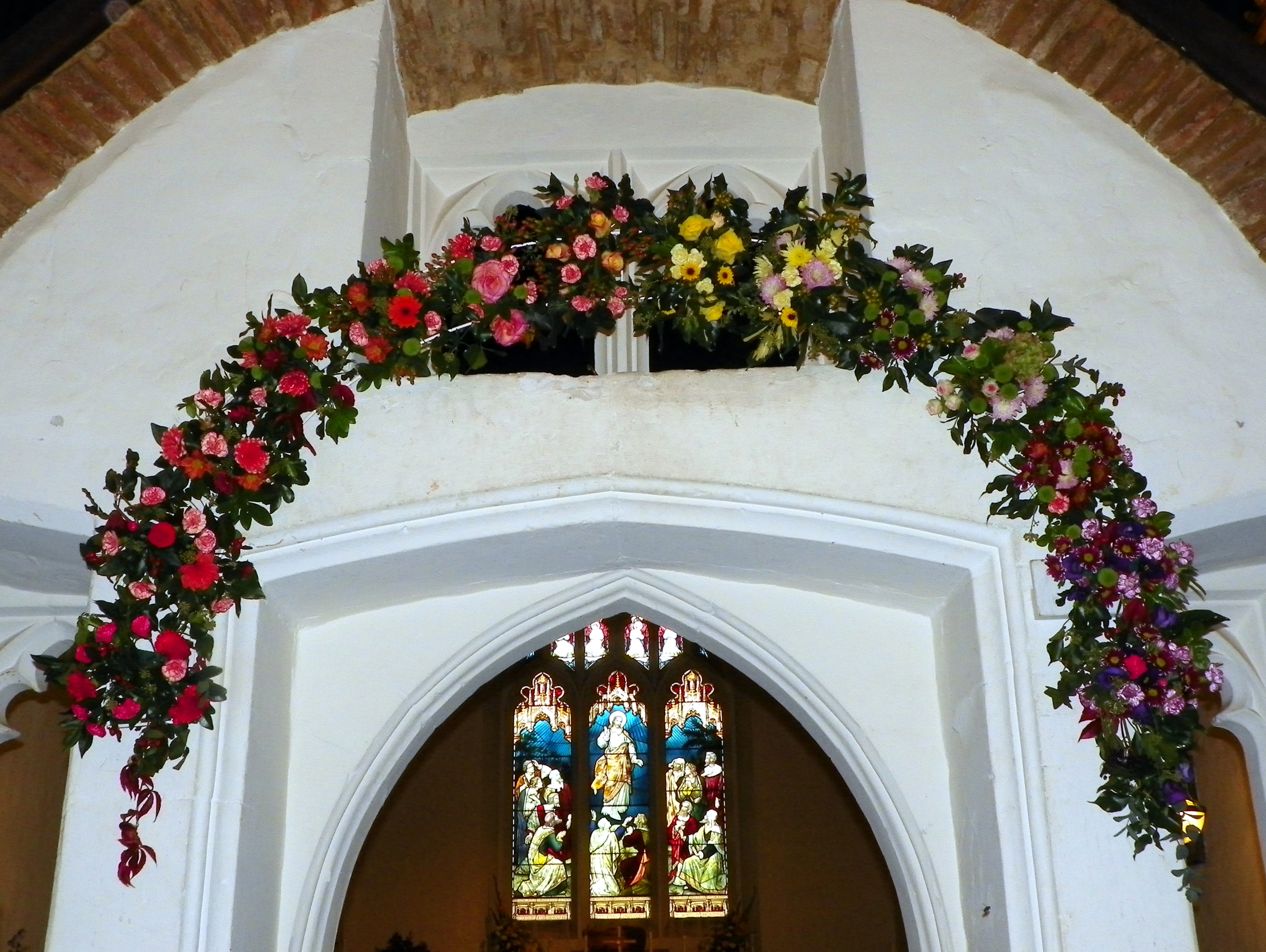

The oldest surviving feature of the present church is possibly the semi-circular head of the arch between the nave and the chancel, although the date of this uncertain. Historic England states that it is 11th century, but another theory is that it dates from 946. The brick may have come from a Roman site in the immediate vicinity of Sandridge or from Verulamium; the abbots of St. Albans are known to have had a stockpile of Roman brick, which was one of the materials used in the fabric of the abbey.

== Dedication of the church and Norman architecture ==
It was no later than 1119 that the church was consecrated and dedicated to St Leonard by Herbert de Losinga, first Bishop of Norwich (he died in 1119), and that Sandridge became a parish.

The nave was enlarged and aisles were added between 1160 and 1180. On either side of the nave are three Norman arches. The font is also thought to date from Norman times. The Early English pointed arch and the tower either built or re-modelled towards the end of the 13th century.

The stone screen was added to the wall between the nave and the chancel towards the end of the 14th century. It is richly ornamented on the eastern side but plainer on the west as here there was a carved wooden screen with rood loft and rood above and an altar on each side of the archway into the chancel. The chancel was re-built and lengthened in 1399 and the squared headed perpendicular windows replaced the narrower Norman windows in the aisles. The south doorway was also built.

The Church Interior

After the dissolution of the monasteries many valuable ornaments and fittings of the church were removed, and the church fell into neglect and decay. By 1638 the church was fitted with pews and the arrangement of these has lasted to modern times. A pulpit was erected on the south side of the nave, the remains of which can be seen in the prayer desks in the sanctuary. The tower collapsed in 1692 or 1693 and the church wardens reported that the rebuilding would cost seven hundred pounds. Nothing was done beyond boarding up the arch in the west end and clearing away some of the rubble.

The clerestory of the nave and the roof were in a very bad state in 1710 but where patched up and made to serve until 1786. In 1786 the rotten walls of the clerestory were removed and the roof lowered and flattened out to rest on the Norman arches. Attic windows were put in and the wooden bell turret erected. Between 1836 and 1838 a tower was built.

The church prior to its restoration

During 1886–1887 the architect William White restored the whole church to the state it exists in today. It cost £3800 and re-opened on 7 June 1887. The ring of bells was dedicated on 11 January 1890.

=== Organ ===
The organ was given by Mr and Mrs Kinder, Mr and Mrs Marten and Dr Griffith. It dates from about 1880 and was originally a single manual instrument. Before the church's restoration it stood in the chancel, then it was re-built under the tower.

In 1914 the instrument was enlarged by Norman and Beard and re-built at the east end of the north aisle. At the same time the pulpit was moved to the north side of the chancel screen and the choir seated in the chancel. The inaugural recital was given in May 1914 by the organist of Temple Church, Walford Davies.

== Lychgate ==
To the south of the churchyard is a lychgate. This structure, which with its flanking walls is a Grade II listed building, was erected after World War I as a memorial.

The dedication of the lychgate in 1921

Plaques list the names of the village's fallen soldiers and also the names of those who served and returned.
