= 2015 St Albans City and District Council election =

2015 UK local government election

← 2014	7 May 2015	2016 →

20 of the 58 seats to St Albans City and District Council 30 seats needed for a majority
	First party	Second party	Third party
Party	Conservative	Liberal Democrats	Labour
Seats after	31	16	8
Seat change	▲3	▼1	▼2
Popular vote	35,047	18,468	14,870
Percentage	43.6%	23.0%	18.5%
	Fourth party	Fifth party
Party	Independent	Green
Seats after	2	1
Seat change	Steady	Steady
Popular vote	2,183	5,055
Percentage	2.7%	6.3%
Council control before election
Conservative
Council control after election
Conservative

The 2015 St Albans City and District Council election took place on 7 May 2015 to elect members of St Albans City and District Council in England. This was on the same day as other local elections.

== Results summary ==
St Albans City and District Council election, 2015
Party	Seats	Gains	Losses	Net gain/loss	Seats %	Votes %	Votes	+/−
Conservative	31	0	1	▼1	53.4	43.6	35,047	
Liberal Democrats	16	2	0	▲2	27.6	23.0	18,468	
Labour	8	0	2	▼2	13.8	18.5	14,870	
Independent	2	0	0	Steady	3.4	2.7	2,183	
Green	1	0	0	Steady	1.7	6.3	5,055	
UKIP	0	0	0	Steady	0.0	5.9	4,736	
TUSC	0	0	0	Steady	0.0	> 0.1	28	

== Ward results ==
=== Ashley ===
Ashley
Party	Candidate	Votes	%	±%
Liberal Democrats	Mohammad Zia	1,306	29.5	−13.0
Labour	Anne Lyons	1,248	28.2	+0.5
Conservative	Emre Kaya	1,193	27.0	+13.0
Green	Robert Whitford	360	8.1	+1.5
UKIP	Charles Mason	313	7.0	−2.2
Majority		58	1.3	−13.5
Turnout		4,420	74.8	+28.8
Liberal Democrats hold		Swing		

=== Batchwood ===
Batchwood
Party	Candidate	Votes	%	±%
Conservative	Timothy Smith	1,368	33.8	+11.5
Labour	Martin Leach	1,348	33.3	−15.9
Liberal Democrats	Elizabeth Needham	654	16.2	+6.7
UKIP	Matthew Dovey	378	9.3	−2.5
Green	Lee Evans	300	7.4	−0.3
Majority		20	0.5	−26.4
Turnout		4,048	73.8	+32.3
Conservative gain from Labour		Swing		

=== Clarence ===
Clarence
Party	Candidate	Votes	%	±%
Liberal Democrats	Samuel Rowlands	1,606	39.3	+6.8
Conservative	Barry Sumpter	1,375	33.6	+9.0
Labour	Jane Cloke	683	16.7	−3.8
Green	Charis Jennings	399	9.8	−5.8
TUSC	Keith Hussey	28	0.7	+0.1
Majority		231	5.6	−2.3
Turnout		4,091	78.3	+33.5
Liberal Democrats hold		Swing		

=== Colney Heath ===
Colney Heath
Party	Candidate	Votes	%	±%
Liberal Democrats	Christopher Brazier	1,421	43.8	+2.5
Conservative	Stella Nash	994	30.6	+11.2
Labour	John Paton	417	12.8	−2.2
UKIP	Christopher Thorpe	255	7.9	−10.7
Green	Timothy Robinson	159	4.9	−0.8
Majority		427	13.2	
Turnout		3,246	73.0	
Liberal Democrats hold		Swing		

=== Cunningham ===
Cunningham
Party	Candidate	Votes	%	±%
Liberal Democrats	Robert Donald	1,233	35.2	+2.7
Conservative	Michael Roth	936	26.7	+6.9
Labour Co-op	John Metcalf	743	21.2	−1.3
UKIP	Alan Malin	371	10.6	−8.0
Green	Rebecca Hurst	217	6.2	−0.4
Majority		297		
Turnout			70.8	
Liberal Democrats hold		Swing		

=== Harpenden East ===
Harpenden East
Party	Candidate	Votes	%	±%
Conservative	Michael Wakely	2,020	49.9	+5.9
Independent	Phillipa Martyn	829	20.5	−10.4
Labour Co-op	Rosemary Ross	632	15.6	+3.2
Liberal Democrats	Paul De Kort	571	14.1	+1.4
Majority		1,191		
Turnout			73.2	
Conservative hold		Swing		

=== Harpenden North ===
Harpenden North
Party	Candidate	Votes	%	±%
Conservative	Albert Pawle	2,179	53.7	+7.8
Independent	John Chambers	565	13.9	−1.5
Labour	Linda Spiri	524	12.9	−1.1
Liberal Democrats	Aileen King	467	11.5	+0.1
Green	William Day	324	8.0	N/A
Majority		1,614		
Turnout			75.6	
Conservative hold		Swing		

=== Harpenden South ===
Harpenden South
Party	Candidate	Votes	%	±%
Conservative	Brian Ellis	2,756	66.4	−6.5
Labour	George Fraser	600	14.5	+0.2
Liberal Democrats	Gillian Tattersfield	503	12.1	−0.7
Independent	John Hansen	293	7.1	N/A
Majority		2,156		
Turnout			77.2	
Conservative hold		Swing		

=== Harpenden West ===
Harpenden West
Party	Candidate	Votes	%	±%
Conservative	Daniel Chichester-Miles	2,670	60.9	−6.7
Labour Co-op	David Lawlor	633	14.4	−2.6
Liberal Democrats	Jeffrey Phillips	582	13.3	−2.1
Independent	Paul Howe	496	11.3	N/A
Majority		2,037		
Turnout			75.5	
Conservative hold		Swing		

=== London Colney ===
London Colney
Liberal Democrats	Matthew Farrell	1,434	38.9	+8.0
Labour	Jacob Quagliozzi	1,737	35.9	−4.0
Conservative	Simon Calder	882	9	+4.3
UKIP	Colin Botterill	587	12.1	−6.7
Party	Candidate	Votes	%	±%
Green	Anna Kinnersley	198	4.1	−0.5
Majority		145		
Turnout			67.4	
Liberal Democrats gain from Labour		Swing		

=== Marshalswick North ===
Marshalswick North
Party	Candidate	Votes	%	±%
Conservative	Carolyn Bolton	1,443	37.5	+9.1
Liberal Democrats	Geoffrey Churchard	1,326	34.5	−1.9
Labour	Richard Harris	485	12.6	+2.0
UKIP	Michael Hollins	337	8.8	−8.4
Green	James Lomas	256	6.7	−0.6
Majority		117		
Turnout			75.8	
Conservative gain from Liberal Democrats		Swing		

=== Marshalswick South ===
Marshalswick South
Party	Candidate	Votes	%	±%
Conservative	Salih Gaygusuz	1,915	44.5	+5.9
Liberal Democrats	Mark Pedroz	1,055	24.5	+5.2
Labour	Vivienne Windle	721	16.8	−5.9
Green	Miriam Gilbert	391	9.1	−1.1
UKIP	David Dickson	217	5.0	−4.2
Majority		860		
Turnout			80	
Conservative hold		Swing		

=== Park Street ===
Park Street
Party	Candidate	Votes	%	±%
Conservative	Paul Wright	1,519	37.2	+10.5
Liberal Democrats	Jadwiga Baillie	1,203	29.4	−10.7
UKIP	Paul Tilyard	593	14.5	−5.8
Labour Co-op	Martin McGrath	587	14.4	+5.0
Green	Lesley Baker	185	4.5	+1.0
Majority		316		
Turnout			71.4	
Conservative hold		Swing		

=== Redbourn ===
Redbourn
Party	Candidate	Votes	%	±%
Conservative	Paul Wright	2,075	58.2	−4.2
Labour	Nicholas Pullinger	541	15.2	−3.8
UKIP	Daragh Cahalane	400	11.2	N/A
Liberal Democrats	Michael Morton	337	9.5	−0.4
Green	Joseph French	210	5.9	−2.9
Majority		1,534		
Turnout			72.9	
Conservative hold		Swing		

=== Sandridge ===
Sandridge
Party	Candidate	Votes	%	±%
Conservative	Frances Leonard	1,703	58.2	+12.1
Liberal Democrats	Stefania Estacchini	501	17.1	+2.2
Labour	Michael Gary-Higgings	415	14.2	+2.3
Green	Paul Quinn	305	10.4	+1.5
Majority		1,202		
Turnout			76.7	
Conservative hold		Swing		

=== Sopwell ===
Sopwell
Party	Candidate	Votes	%	±%
Labour	Eileen Harris	1,347	34.7	+0.1
Liberal Democrats	David Poor	1,055	27.2	−6.1
Conservative	Panagiotis Yfantoudas	880	22.7	+10.0
UKIP	Valerie Hargrave	315	8.1	−4.5
Green	Gail Jackson	282	7.3	+0.5
Majority		292		
Turnout			72.3	
Labour hold		Swing		

=== St Peters ===
St Peters
Party	Candidate	Votes	%	±%
Conservative	Alexander Campbell	1,634	35.6	+10.0
Liberal Democrats	Matthew Jones	1,250	27.2	+3.2
Labour	Alexander Veitch	778	16.9	−3.8
Green	Jill Mills	741	16.1	−7.5
UKIP	Michael Douglas	191	4.2	−1.9
Majority		384		
Turnout			73.0	
Conservative hold		Swing		

=== St Stephen ===
St Stephen
Party	Candidate	Votes	%	±%
Conservative	David Winstone	2,078	50.3	+13.1
Liberal Democrats	Alison Ross	920	22.3	+2.4
UKIP	Peter Whitehead	527	12.8	−12.1
Labour	Janet Blackwell	442	10.7	+1.5
Green	Lydia El-Khouri	163	3.9	−4.0
Majority		1,158		
Turnout			76.7	
Conservative hold		Swing		

=== Verulam ===
Verulam
Party	Candidate	Votes	%	±%
Conservative	Jessica Chivers	2,183	48.0	+14.0
Liberal Democrats	Trisha Windsor-Williams	1,298	28.5	−9.3
Labour Co-op	Michael Bartlet	533	11.7	+3.0
Green	Mark Ewington	282	6.2	−1.7
UKIP	Colin Donald	252	5.5	−6.1
Majority		885		
Turnout			82.3	
Conservative hold		Swing		

=== Wheathampstead ===
Wheathampstead
Party	Candidate	Votes	%	±%
Conservative	Sandra Wood	2,244	60.2	+8.8
Liberal Democrats	Harriet Sherlock	746	20.0	−0.9
Labour Co-op	Gavin Ross	456	12.2	+2.7
Green	Ian Troughton	283	7.6	−7.9
Majority		1,498		
Turnout			75.3	
Conservative hold		Swing		
