= 2021 St Albans City and District Council election =

Election

← 2019	6 May 2021	2022 →

21 of the 58 seats to St Albans City and District Council 30 seats needed for a majority
	First party	Second party	Third party
Party	Liberal Democrats	Conservative	Labour
Seats before	26	23	5
Seats won	4	0	0
Seats after	30	23	2
Seat change	▲4	Steady	▼3
Popular vote	20,918	17,393	5,619
Percentage	41.2%	34.3%	11.1%
	Fourth party	Fifth party
Party	Independent	Green
Seats before	3	1
Seats won	0	0
Seats after	2	1
Seat change	▼1	Steady
Popular vote	616	6,090
Percentage	1.2%	12.0%
- Winner in each ward for the 2021 St Albans City and District Council election
Council control before election
No overall control
Council control after election
Liberal Democrats

The 2021 St Albans City and District Council election took place on 6 May 2021, delayed by one year due to the COVID-19 pandemic, to elect members of St Albans City and District Council in England. This was on the same day as other local elections. At the elections, the Liberal Democrats achieved a majority for the first time since 2011 and took the council back from no overall control.

== Results summary ==
2021 St Albans City and District Council election
Party	This election			Full council			This election		
Party	Seats	Net	Seats %	Other	Total	Total %	Votes	Votes %	+/−
Liberal Democrats	11	▲5	55.0	19	30	51.7	20,918	41.2	-0.9
Conservative	8	▼1	40.0	15	23	39.7	17,393	34.3	+4.0
Labour	0	▼3	0.0	2	2	39.7	5,619	11.1	-3.5
Independent	0	▼1	0.0	2	2	3.4	616	1.2	-1.5
Green	1	Steady	5.0	0	1	1.7	6,090	12.0	+1.7
Reform UK	0	Steady	0.0	0	0	0.0	71	0.1	New
Workers Party	0	Steady	0.0	0	0	0.0	37	<0.1	New

== Ward results ==
=== Ashley ===
Ashley
Party	Candidate	Votes	%	±%
Liberal Democrats	Mark Pedroz	1,672	60.5	+4.5
Green	Stephane Farenga	372	13.5	+1.3
Conservative	Don Ratnasekera	348	12.6	+2.9
Labour	Jonathan Pearce	311	11.3	−10.8
Workers Party	Ajantha Kangaha Arachchi	37	1.3	New
Majority		1,301	46.5	+12.6
Turnout		2,764	44.8	+4.4
Liberal Democrats hold		Swing	+1.6	

=== Batchwood ===
Batchwood
Party	Candidate	Votes	%	±%
Liberal Democrats	Sinead Howland	1,311	51.5	+12.0
Conservative	Ross Andrews	506	19.9	+2.8
Labour	Mal Pakenham	483	19.0	−14.9
Green	Anne McQuade	188	7.4	−2.0
Reform UK	David Thurston	35	1.4	New
Majority		805	31.6	−17.3
Turnout		2,547	45.7	+4.1
Liberal Democrats gain from Labour		Swing	+13.5	

=== Clarence ===
Clarence
Party	Candidate	Votes	%	±%
Liberal Democrats	Chris White	1,643	61.4	−2.5
Green	Matt Fisher	458	17.1	+6.5
Conservative	Ambrose Killen	388	14.5	−0.5
Labour	George Sanderson	172	6.4	−4.1
Majority		1,185	44.3	−4.6
Turnout		2,677	48.7	+16.4
Liberal Democrats hold		Swing	-4.5	

* A by-election took place in this ward on 3 October 2019 in order to fill a seat vacancy.

=== Cunningham ===
Cunningham
Party	Candidate	Votes	%	±%
Liberal Democrats	Geoff Harrison	1,220	55.4	+0.8
Conservative	Jordan Sweeney	581	26.4	+8.5
Labour	John Paton	227	10.3	−10.2
Green	Phil Fletcher	146	6.6	−0.4
Majority		639	29.0	−5.1
Turnout		2,201	44.6	+1.4
Liberal Democrats hold		Swing	-3.9	

=== Harpenden East ===
Harpenden East
Party	Candidate	Votes	%	±%
Liberal Democrats	Pip Liver	1,100	44.0	+13.9
Liberal Democrats	Paul de Kort	993	39.6	+9.5
Conservative	Matt Stephens	935	37.4	+4.8
Conservative	Paul Foster	817	32.7	+0.1
Labour	Eleanor Clarke	263	10.5	+1.6
Labour	James Gill	228	9.1	+0.2
Green	Angela Troughton	189	7.6	−0.7
Green	Dee Thomas	184	7.4	−0.9
Majority		58	2.2	N/A
Turnout		2,498	44.7	+8.0
Liberal Democrats gain from Conservative		Swing	+4.6	
Liberal Democrats gain from Conservative		Swing	+4.7	

=== Harpenden North ===
Harpenden North
Party	Candidate	Votes	%	±%
Liberal Democrats	Allison Wren	1,124	45.0	+10.2
Conservative	Susan Griffiths	1,005	40.2	−4.7
Green	Tracy Morris	195	7.8	−3.2
Labour	Emily Tilly	149	6.0	−3.3
Majority		119	4.8	N/A
Turnout		2,497	44.1	+11.1
Liberal Democrats gain from Conservative		Swing	+7.5	

=== Harpenden South ===
Harpenden South
Party	Candidate	Votes	%	±%
Conservative	David Heritage	1,325	54.7	+0.5
Conservative	Mark Beashel	1,317	54.4	+0.2
Liberal Democrats	Denise Bowser	536	22.0	+1.2
Liberal Democrats	Maddie Liver	459	19.0	−1.8
Green	Nina Vinther	307	12.7	+0.2
Labour	Linda Spiri	230	9.5	−2.9
Labour	David Crew	229	9.5	−2.9
Green	Ian Troughton	170	7.0	−5.5
Majority		789	32.7	−0.7
Turnout		2,421	44.6	+10.1
Conservative hold		Swing	-0.4	
Conservative hold		Swing	+1.0	

=== Harpenden West ===
Harpenden West
Party	Candidate	Votes	%	±%
Conservative	Lisa Scriven	1,293	43.3	−6.2
Liberal Democrats	Jeffrey Phillips	863	28.9	+1.5
Green	Kyle Riley	565	19	+5.3
Labour	Rebecca Madole	233	7.8	−1.6
Majority		500	14.4	−5.7
Turnout		2,989	48.8	+10.0
Conservative hold		Swing	-3.9	

=== London Colney ===
London Colney
Party	Candidate	Votes	%	±%
Conservative	Sarah Tallon	897	37.1	+3.0
Labour	Dreda Gordon	837	34.6	−4.3
Liberal Democrats	Tony Lillico	478	19.7	+1.3
Green	Mark Park-Crowne	189	7.8	−0.8
Majority		60	2.5	N/A
Turnout		2,418	33.3	+2.5
Conservative gain from Labour		Swing	+3.7	

=== Marshalswick North ===
Marshalswick North
Party	Candidate	Votes	%	±%
Liberal Democrats	Raj Visram	1,230	52.1	−6.1
Conservative	Claudio Duran	722	30.6	+4.9
Green	James Lomas	207	8.8	−0.2
Labour	Alexander Veitch	175	7.4	−0.7
Majority		508	21.5	−10.0
Turnout		2,359	45.8	+2.8
Liberal Democrats hold		Swing	-5.5	

=== Marshalswick South ===
Marshalswick South
Party	Candidate	Votes	%	±%
Liberal Democrats	Will Jankowski	1,607	53.9	+0.2
Conservative	Salih Gaygusuz	899	30.1	−0.5
Green	Nadia Bishara	269	9.0	+1.5
Labour	Iain Grant	207	6.9	−1.4
Majority		708	23.8	+0.7
Turnout		3,003	53.3	+3.5
Liberal Democrats hold		Swing	+0.4	

=== Park Street ===
Park Street
Party	Candidate	Votes	%	±%
Conservative	Richard Curthoys	946	35.4	−0.4
Liberal Democrats	Simon Mostyn	807	30.2	−13.4
Independent	David Yates	616	23.1	New
Labour	Martin McGrath	167	6.3	−3.7
Green	Lucy Swift	116	4.3	−6.3
Majority		139	5.2	N/A
Turnout		2,669	44.9	+9.8
Conservative gain from Liberal Democrats		Swing	+6.5	

David Yates was the sitting councillor, and had been elected as a Liberal Democrat in 2016.

=== Redbourn ===
Redbourn
Party	Candidate	Votes	%	±%
Conservative	Thomas Chapman	1,027	47.4	+15.1
Liberal Democrats	Brian Gunson	683	31.5	+18.6
Labour	Symon Vergo	290	13.4	−0.1
Green	David Brockway	137	6.3	New
Majority		544	15.9	N/A
Turnout		2,167	44.7	+7.1
Conservative gain from Independent		Swing	N/A	

=== Sopwell ===
Sopwell
Party	Candidate	Votes	%	±%
Liberal Democrats	Sarwar Shamser	1,492	57.1	+9.8
Labour	Janet Smith	528	20.2	−12.6
Conservative	Susan Devi	398	15.2	+4.7
Green	Lesley Baker	165	6.3	−3.1
Majority		964	36.9	−1.5
Turnout		2,615	47.5	+4.9
Liberal Democrats gain from Labour		Swing	+11.2	

=== St Peters ===
St Peters
Party	Candidate	Votes	%	±%
Green	Simon Grover	1,719	59.1	+40.2
Conservative	Georgie Calle	650	22.3	+3.1
Labour	Ed Bailey	509	17.5	+7.6
Majority		1,069	36.8	N/A
Turnout		2,911	43.5	+2.5
Green hold		Swing	+18.6	

=== St Stephen ===
St Stephen
Party	Candidate	Votes	%	±%
Conservative	Aaron Jacob	1,177	46.6	−6.2
Liberal Democrats	Alison Smith	1,120	44.4	+16.7
Green	Nick Bainbridge	125	5.0	−6.4
Labour	Janet Blackwell	102	4.0	−4.1
Majority		57	1.8	−23.3
Turnout		2,524	46.8	+10.2
Conservative hold		Swing	-11.5	

=== Verulam ===
Verulam
Party	Candidate	Votes	%	±%
Liberal Democrats	Chris Davies	1,888	59.6	+4.2
Conservative	Alex Clark	898	28.3	−3.0
Green	Candy Whittome	173	5.5	−2.2
Labour	Laurence Chester	134	4.2	−1.3
Reform UK	Andrew Butchart	36	1.2	New
Majority		990	41.3	+17.2
Turnout		3,170	55.8	+6.2
Liberal Democrats hold		Swing	+3.6	

=== Wheathampstead ===
Wheathampstead
Party	Candidate	Votes	%	±%
Conservative	Gill Clark	1,264	54.2	+10.5
Liberal Democrats	Ben Batt	692	29.6	−7.2
Green	Oliver Hitch	216	9.3	−3.7
Labour	Jonathan Hegerty	145	6.2	−1.7
Majority		572	24.6	−44.5
Turnout		2,334	46.8	+6.7
Conservative hold		Swing	+8.9	
