= Aubrey Park Hotel =

Building in Redbourn, Hertfordshire, England

Coordinates: 51.78742188649248°N 0.41404235767777764°W

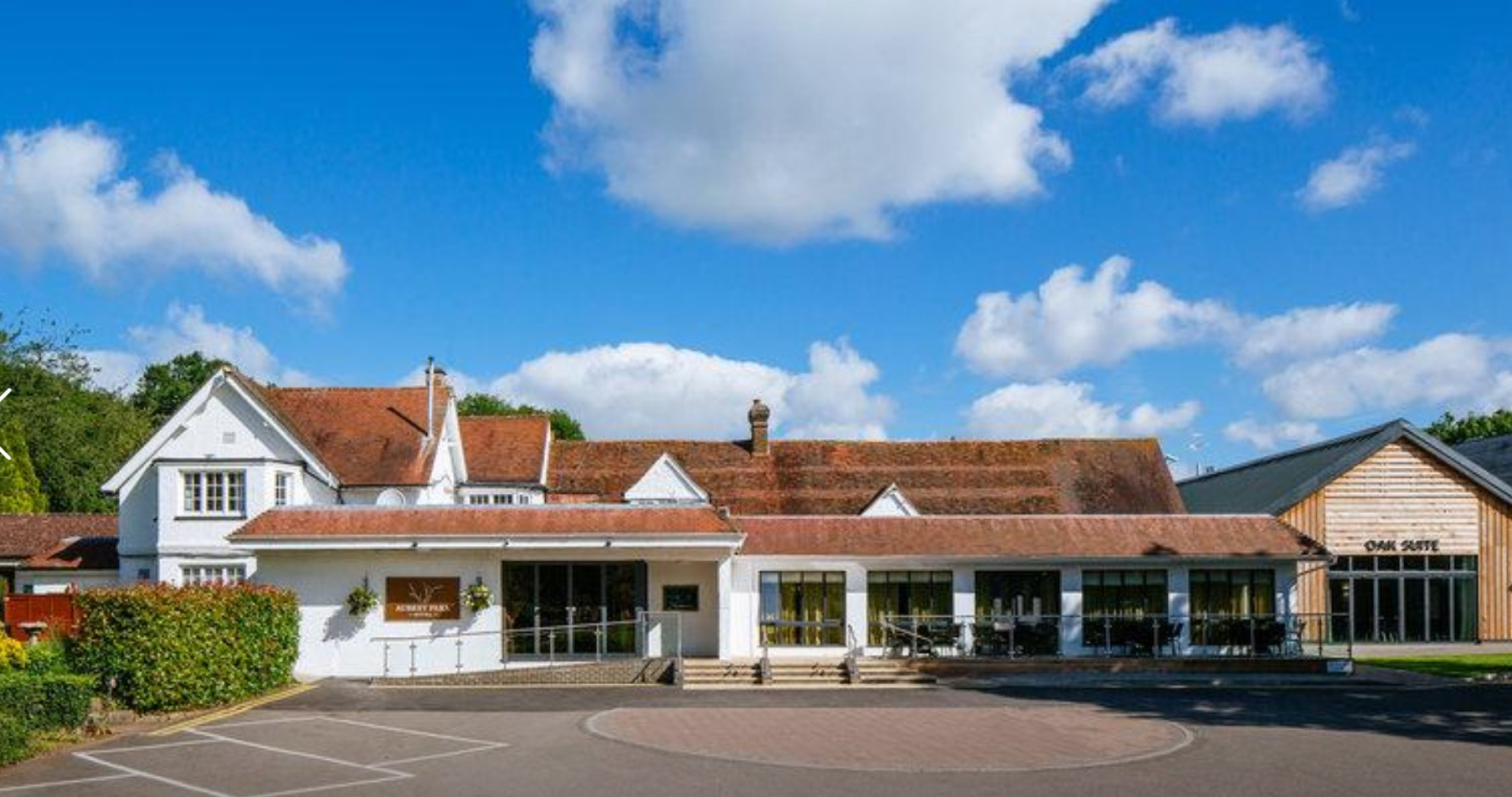
Aubrey Park Hotel

Aubrey Park, Redbourn in Hertfordshire is a building of historical significance and is listed on the English Heritage Register. Parts of the building date back to the 16th and 17th centuries and the site on which it is located may have its origins in the 13th century. Today it is a hotel which provides accommodation, restaurant facilities and caters for special events including weddings.

== Owners of Aubrey Park ==
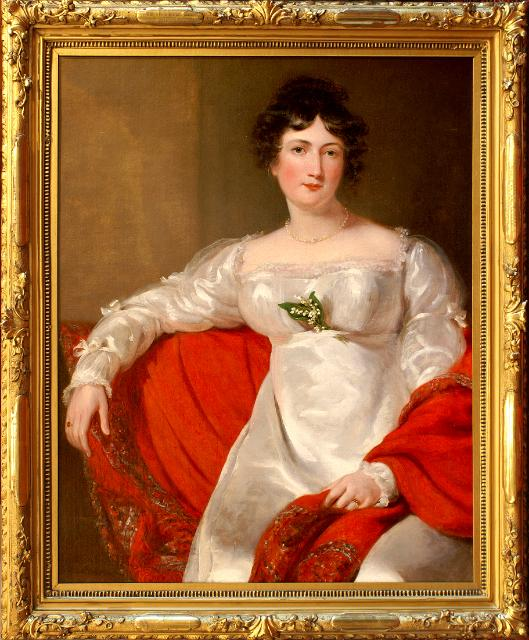
Mary Elizabeth Bowes-Lyon (née Carpenter)

Aubrey Park was previously called Foster's Farm and it seems that during the 17th century it was owned by the Carpenter family who were wealthy Redbourn residents possessing large areas of land. Until 1640 they lived at Revel End which is adjacent to Foster's farm. They then built Redbourn House in the early 18th century. The Carpenter family named the eldest son George for five generations and all lived in or around the village.

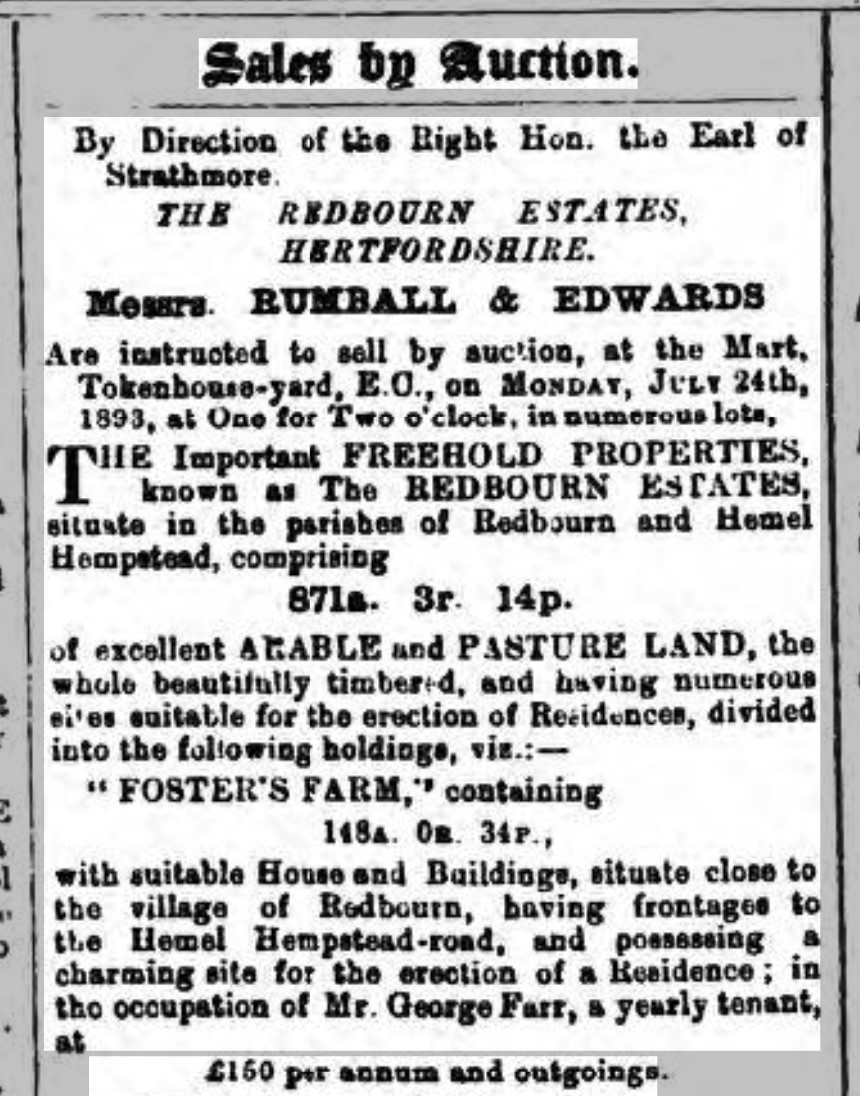
Sale notice for Foster's Farm 1893

George Carpenter (1713–1782) who was the last of the line had an only child named Mary Elizabeth Carpenter (1783–1811). She was his sole heir. In 1800 she married the 11th Earl of Strathmore (1743–1846) and her marriage settlement mentioned the Carpenters Redbourn Estate which included properties such as Redbourn House and Foster's Farm. The couple had one child Thomas George Bowes-Lyon (1801–1834) called Lord Glamis. In 1820 he married Charlotte Grimstead (1797–1881) who became Lady Glamis. Thomas who was the great-grandfather of the Queen Mother was the eldest son and intended heir of the 11th Earl of Strathmore died in 1834 before his father's death of 1846. Before he died his father gave him the Redbourne Estate which had been part of his mother's marriage settlement.

In his will of 1835 Thomas left this property to his wife Charlotte, Lady Glamis. The 1843 tithe map shows that she is the owner of Foster's Farm. After her husband's death Charlotte lived for much of her life at Redbourn House. The 1841 census records her as living at the house with her mother Charlotte Grimstead. In 1865 she moved to "the Red House" in High Street.

Lady Glamis retained ownership of Foster's Farm until her death in 1881. The whole of her Redbourn Estate was inherited by her son the 13th Earl of Strathmore. In 1893 the Earl sold the estate and the sale notice for Foster's Farm is shown.

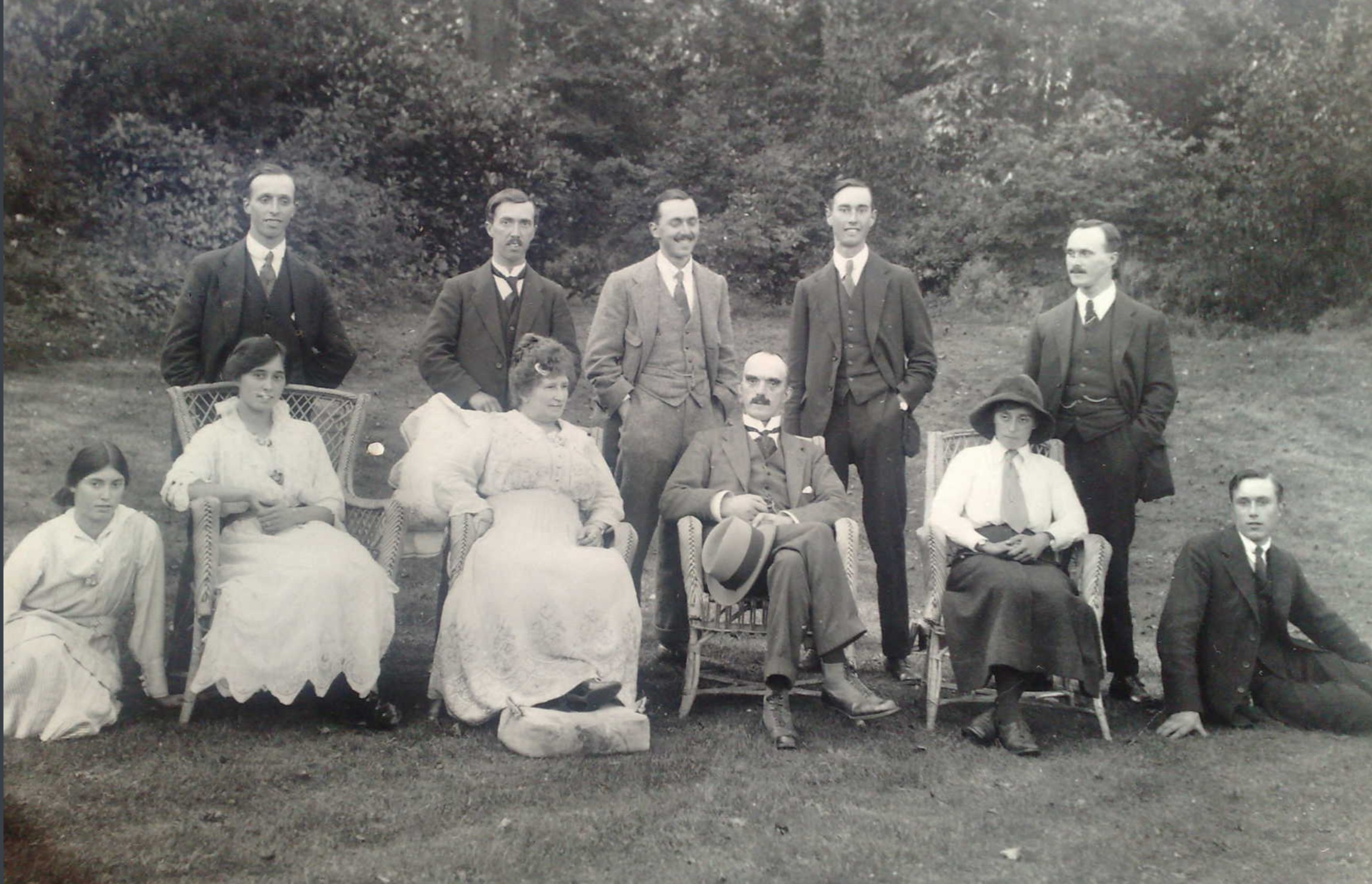
The Dunn family. Standing at the back: Howard, Ellis, Clifford, Stanley, Lloyd Seated at the front: Corween, Yolande, Lucy, G. A. Dunn, Winifred, Morton

Some of the estate which included Foster's Farm was bought by Sir John Blundell Maple who was a business magnate who owned the furniture manufacturing company Maple and Co. He was the proprietor of Foster's Farm for about twelve years and in about 1905 it was sold to the Dunn family who were residents for over 35 years.

George Arthur Dunn (1865–1939) was an extremely wealthy businessman. He was the owner of the famous menswear company Dunn and Co which specialised in men's hats. In 1884 he married Lucy Day (1863–1939) and the couple had nine children who can be seen in the photo taken at "The Aubreys" in 1918.

After he bought Foster's Farm he made substantial additions to it and renamed it "the Aubreys". He was an advocate of the "back to the land" movement and "kitchen farming" which was very popular in England at the turn of the century and he bought over 1000 acres of land surrounding "the Aubreys". He introduced some advanced farming methods into the area and was said to have one of the first combine harvesters in England. He bought the Branksome Dean Hotel in Bournemouth and developed it as a vegetarian establishment.

He died in 1939 at "the Aubreys" and in 1946 the Dunn family sold the property. The sale notice was in The Times. In the 1960s the house became the Aubrey Park Hotel.

== The tenants of Aubrey Park ==
During the 19th century when it was still called Foster's Farm there were several notable people who were tenants. The 1843 tithe map shows that John Beaumont was the resident at this time. He was the son of John Beaumont (1745–1815) and his wife Ann who had been tenant farmers at Flowers Farm which is nearby. After he died in 1851 Frederic Faircloth (1805–1880) became the resident farmer. In the 1861 census shows that James Draper and his wife Sarah followed in the 1871 by George Saunders (1821–1907) and his wife Faith. The 1881 census records George Farr (1845–1915) and his wife Jessie as the residents. The Farr family remained there as tenants until about 1905 when it was bought by the Dunn family.
