= 2018 St Albans City and District Council election =

English local election

| ← 2016 | 3 May 2018 | 2019 → |

20 of the 58 seats to St Albans City and District Council 30 seats needed for a majority
| | First party | Second party | Third party |
|---|---|---|---|
| Party | Conservative | Liberal Democrats | Labour |
| Seats before | 32 | 17 | 7 |
| Seats won | 1 | 3 | 0 |
| Seats after | 31 | 19 | 6 |
| Seat change | ▼1 | ▲2 | ▼1 |
| Popular vote | 17,028 | 15,528 | 8,592 |
| Percentage | 38.2% | 34.9% | 19.3% |
| | Fourth party | Fifth party | Sixth party |
| Party | Independent | Green | UKIP |
| Seats before | 1 | 1 | 0 |
| Seats won | 0 | 0 | 0 |
| Seats after | 1 | 1 | 0 |
| Seat change | Steady | Steady | Steady |
| Popular vote | 231 | 3,008 | 134 |
| Percentage | 0.5% | 6.8% | 0.3% |
Council control before election
Conservative
Council control after election
Conservative

The 2018 St Albans City and District Council election took place on 3 May 2018 to elect members of St Albans City and District Council in England. This was on the same day as other local elections.

== Results summary ==
St Albans City and District Council election, 2018
| Party | Seats | Gains | Losses | Net gain/loss | Seats % | Votes % | Votes | +/− |
|---|---|---|---|---|---|---|---|---|
| Conservative | 31 | 1 | 2 | ▼1 | | 38.2 | 17,028 | ▲2.4 |
| Liberal Democrats | 19 | 3 | 1 | ▲2 | | 34.9 | 15,528 | ▲9.6 |
| Labour | 6 | 0 | 1 | ▼1 | | 19.3 | 8,592 | ▼1.8 |
| Independent | 1 | 0 | 0 | Steady | | 0.5 | 231 | ▼3.9 |
| Green | 1 | 0 | 0 | Steady | | 6.8 | 3,008 | ▲0.4 |
| UKIP | 0 | 0 | 0 | Steady | | 0.3 | 134 | ▼6.6 |

== Ward results ==
=== Ashley ===
Ashley
| Party | Candidate | Votes | % | ±% |
|---|---|---|---|---|
| Liberal Democrats | Anthony Francis Rowlands | 1,407 | 57.8 | +20.4 |
| Labour | Jagat Mohan Chatrath | 557 | 22.9 | −10.4 |
| Conservative | John Stephen Whale | 326 | 13.4 | −3.3 |
| Green | Stephane Antoine Farenga | 145 | 6.0 | −1.2 |
| Majority | | 850 | 34.9 | +30.8 |
| Liberal Democrats hold | | Swing | | |

=== Batchwood ===
Batchwood
| Party | Candidate | Votes | % | ±% |
|---|---|---|---|---|
| Labour | Roma Mills | 1,238 | 50.2 | +4.5 |
| Liberal Democrats | Liz Needham | 576 | 23.3 | +14.1 |
| Conservative | Nadine Louise Standish | 508 | 20.6 | −9.9 |
| Green | Lucy Caroline Swift | 146 | 5.9 | −0.8 |
| Majority | | 662 | 26.9 | +11.7 |
| Labour hold | | Swing | | |

=== Clarence ===
Clarence
| Party | Candidate | Votes | % | ±% |
|---|---|---|---|---|
| Liberal Democrats | Caroline Mary Brooke | 1,370 | 57.8 | +6.9 |
| Conservative | Patti Seabright | 533 | 22.5 | +1.3 |
| Labour | Alexander Charles Veitch | 308 | 13.0 | −4.2 |
| Green | Mary Clare Henry | 159 | 6.7 | −3.1 |
| Majority | | 837 | 35.3 | +5.6 |
| Liberal Democrats hold | | Swing | | |

=== Colney Heath ===
Colney Heath
| Party | Candidate | Votes | % | ±% |
|---|---|---|---|---|
| Liberal Democrats | Jamie Day | 853 | 53.1 | +9.3 |
| Conservative | David Michael Johns | 434 | 27.0 | −3.6 |
| Labour | Eileen Francis | 242 | 15.1 | +2.3 |
| Green | Thomas William Langton | 78 | 4.9 | ±0.0 |
| Majority | | 419 | 26.1 | +12.9 |
| Liberal Democrats hold | | Swing | | |

=== Cunningham ===
Cunningham
| Party | Candidate | Votes | % | ±% |
|---|---|---|---|---|
| Liberal Democrats | Robert Graham Prowse | 805 | 37.8 | −2.0 |
| Labour | Muhammad Abdur Rahim | 596 | 28.0 | +6.6 |
| Conservative | Sarah Georgina Tallon | 544 | 25.6 | −1.1 |
| Green | Phil Fletcher | 105 | 4.9 | −0.4 |
| UKIP | Alan Robert Malin | 78 | 3.7 | −6.1 |
| Majority | | 209 | 9.8 | −3.3 |
| Liberal Democrats hold | | Swing | | |

=== Harpenden East ===
Harpenden East
| Party | Candidate | Votes | % | ±% |
|---|---|---|---|---|
| Conservative | Mary Maynard | 1,048 | 52.1 | +5.0 |
| Liberal Democrats | Guy Christian Cozon | 604 | 30.0 | +17.6 |
| Labour | James Nathanie Gill | 361 | 17.9 | +3.1 |
| Majority | | 444 | 22.1 | −4.2 |
| Conservative hold | | Swing | | |

=== Harpenden North ===
Harpenden North
| Party | Candidate | Votes | % | ±% |
|---|---|---|---|---|
| Conservative | Paul Cousin | 982 | 51.0 | +3.7 |
| Liberal Democrats | Melanie Woutera Lucy Priggen | 586 | 30.4 | +18.5 |
| Labour | Linda Ann Spiri | 241 | 12.5 | −2.9 |
| Green | Ian Troughton | 116 | 6.0 | N/A |
| Majority | | 396 | 20.6 | −6.4 |
| Conservative hold | | Swing | | |

=== Harpenden South ===
Harpenden South
| Party | Candidate | Votes | % | ±% |
|---|---|---|---|---|
| Conservative | Teresa Catherine Heritage | 1,322 | 64.3 | −0.6 |
| Liberal Democrats | Zoe Frances Galvin | 350 | 17.0 | +5.2 |
| Labour | George Murray Fraser | 274 | 13.3 | +1.1 |
| Green | Sally Leonard | 111 | 5.4 | +0.6 |
| Majority | | 972 | 47.3 | −5.4 |
| Conservative hold | | Swing | | |

=== Harpenden West ===
Harpenden West
| Party | Candidate | Votes | % | ±% |
|---|---|---|---|---|
| Conservative | Julian Francis Daly | 1,377 | 58.2 | +2.2 |
| Liberal Democrats | Alison Clare Woodley | 553 | 23.4 | +7.5 |
| Labour | Michael Philip Gray-Higgins | 313 | 13.2 | −1.3 |
| Green | Candy Whittome | 125 | 5.3 | −1.9 |
| Majority | | 824 | 34.8 | −5.3 |
| Conservative hold | | Swing | | |

=== London Colney ===
London Colney
| Party | Candidate | Votes | % | ±% |
|---|---|---|---|---|
| Labour | Katherine Lucy Gardner | 963 | 38.9 | −13.6 |
| Conservative | Robert Anthony Dunster | 784 | 31.6 | +2.2 |
| Liberal Democrats | Tony Lillico | 394 | 15.9 | +11.4 |
| Independent | John Midgley | 171 | 6.9 | N/A |
| Green | Matt Maddock | 110 | 4.4 | +0.7 |
| UKIP | Charles Michael Mason | 56 | 2.3 | −7.6 |
| Majority | | 179 | 7.3 | −15.8 |
| Labour hold | | Swing | | |

=== Marshalswick North ===
Marshalswick North
| Party | Candidate | Votes | % | ±% |
|---|---|---|---|---|
| Liberal Democrats | Tom Clegg | 1,014 | 45.5 | +1.6 |
| Conservative | Guillermo Claudio Duran | 779 | 35.0 | +4.5 |
| Labour | Mary Winfred McIntyre | 307 | 13.8 | +1.2 |
| Green | Dee Thomas | 127 | 5.7 | −0.9 |
| Majority | | 235 | 10.5 | −2.9 |
| Liberal Democrats hold | | Swing | | |

=== Marshalswick South ===
Marshalswick South
| Party | Candidate | Votes | % | ±% |
|---|---|---|---|---|
| Liberal Democrats | Helen Rosemary Campbell | 1,113 | 41.2 | +23.4 |
| Conservative | Craig Steven Fothergill | 927 | 34.3 | −9.0 |
| Labour | Jonathan Brian Pearce | 453 | 16.8 | −6.7 |
| Green | Jill Mills | 146 | 5.4 | −5.2 |
| Independent | Susan Devi | 60 | 2.2 | N/A |
| Majority | | 186 | 6.9 | −12.9 |
| Liberal Democrats gain from Conservative | | Swing | | |

=== Park Street ===
Park Street
| Party | Candidate | Votes | % | ±% |
|---|---|---|---|---|
| Conservative | Stella Maria Nita Nash | 1,008 | 44.0 | +14.4 |
| Liberal Democrats | Syed Nafees Husain Abidi | 918 | 40.1 | −3.1 |
| Labour | Janet Elizabeth Blackwell | 282 | 12.3 | +1.0 |
| Green | Rosalind Mary Paul | 84 | 3.7 | +0.8 |
| Majority | | 90 | 3.9 | −9.7 |
| Conservative gain from Liberal Democrats | | Swing | | |

=== Redbourn ===
Redbourn
| Party | Candidate | Votes | % | ±% |
|---|---|---|---|---|
| Conservative | Victoria Caroline Mead | 1,096 | 61.4 | +28.0 |
| Labour | Anthony Eric Neville | 330 | 18.5 | +7.1 |
| Liberal Democrats | Christopher James Millward Brattle | 223 | 12.5 | N/A |
| Green | Ruth Eleanor Farenga | 135 | 7.6 | N/A |
| Majority | | 766 | 42.9 | +26.7 |
| Conservative hold | | Swing | | |

=== Sandridge ===
Sandridge
| Party | Candidate | Votes | % | ±% |
|---|---|---|---|---|
| Conservative | Beric Jonathan Read | 786 | 51.2 | −7.0 |
| Liberal Democrats | Stefania Estacchini | 332 | 21.6 | +4.5 |
| Labour | Jonathan Bereton Hegerty | 245 | 16.0 | +1.8 |
| Green | James Richard Lomas | 172 | 11.2 | +0.8 |
| Majority | | 454 | 29.6 | −11.5 |
| Conservative hold | | Swing | | |

=== Sopwell ===
Sopwell
| Party | Candidate | Votes | % | ±% |
|---|---|---|---|---|
| Liberal Democrats | Shakir Rahman | 1,234 | 49.3 | +12.1 |
| Labour | Iain Charles Grant | 834 | 33.3 | −4.0 |
| Conservative | Heather Christine Rench | 331 | 13.2 | −0.1 |
| Green | Frankie Drummond Charig | 103 | 4.1 | −1.4 |
| Majority | | 400 | 16.0 | +15.9 |
| Liberal Democrats gain from Labour | | Swing | | |

=== St Peters ===
St Peters
| Party | Candidate | Votes | % | ±% |
|---|---|---|---|---|
| Liberal Democrats | Jacqui Taylor | 849 | 31.5 | +4.0 |
| Green | Keith Michael Cotton | 786 | 29.1 | +1.3 |
| Conservative | Alun Davies | 721 | 26.7 | +1.5 |
| Labour | Mark Antony Ewington | 341 | 12.6 | −3.7 |
| Majority | | 63 | 2.4 | +2.1 |
| Liberal Democrats gain from Conservative | | Swing | | |

=== St Stephen ===
St Stephen
| Party | Candidate | Votes | % | ±% |
|---|---|---|---|---|
| Conservative | Sue Featherstone | 1,367 | 63.5 | +8.4 |
| Liberal Democrats | Alison Ross | 473 | 22.0 | +0.4 |
| Labour | Heather Jane Troy | 212 | 9.9 | +0.2 |
| Green | Mark Stephen Charles Park-Crowne | 100 | 4.6 | +1.5 |
| Majority | | 894 | 41.5 | +8.0 |
| Conservative hold | | Swing | | |

=== Verulam ===
Verulam
| Party | Candidate | Votes | % | ±% |
|---|---|---|---|---|
| Liberal Democrats | Edgar Hill | 1,593 | 56.5 | +12.9 |
| Conservative | Nicholas Paul Verity | 858 | 30.4 | −6.2 |
| Labour | Gordon Baisley | 257 | 9.1 | −1.0 |
| Green | Josie McNally | 113 | 4.0 | −0.4 |
| Majority | | 735 | 26.1 | +19.1 |
| Liberal Democrats hold | | Swing | | |

=== Wheathampstead ===
Wheathampstead
| Party | Candidate | Votes | % | ±% |
|---|---|---|---|---|
| Conservative | Annie Brewster | 1,297 | 66.1 | +5.4 |
| Liberal Democrats | Andrew Peter Crofts | 281 | 14.3 | −0.7 |
| Labour | Neill Sankey | 238 | 12.1 | −1.4 |
| Green | Oliver James Hitch | 147 | 7.5 | +2.4 |
| Majority | | 1,016 | 51.8 | +8.1 |
| Conservative hold | | Swing | | |
