= St Mary's Church, Redbourn =

Church in Hertfordshire, England

St Mary’s Church, Redbourn
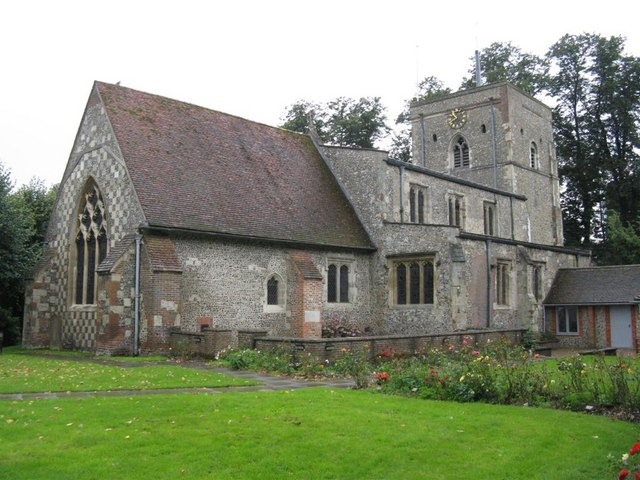
- St Mary’s Church, Redbourn

- Location within Hertfordshire
- 51.792251°N 0.406746°W
- OS grid reference: TL 09994 11570
- Location: Redbourn
- Country: England
- Denomination: Church of England
- Website: stmarysredbourn.org

History
- Dedication: Saint Mary the Virgin

Architecture
- Heritage designation: Grade I listed

Administration
- Diocese: Diocese of St Albans
- Archdeaconry: St Albans
- Deanery: Wheathamstead
- Parish: Redbourn

St Mary's Church is an active Grade I listed parish church in the Church of England in Redbourn, Hertfordshire, England. The building is Grade I listed.

== History ==
The church dates from the 12th century, the oldest parts being the nave and west tower. The north aisle was added around 1140 and the chancel in 1340. The south aisle was built in the mid 14th century, the south chapel and porch between 1444 and 1455. The clerestory was added around 1478.

The east window was installed in 1886 in memory of Rev. W. Serocold Wade and was designed by Mayer of London and Munich.

== Memorials ==
The church contains memorials to

- Sir Richard Rede (d. 1576)
- Richard Peacock (d. 1512)
- Eignon Bignon and his wife (1717)

== Organ ==
The church contains a pipe organ originally dating from 1888 by Forster and Andrews. This was rebuilt in 1932 by Roy Huntingford and in 1961 by Arnold, Williamson and Hyatt. The last restoration was in 2005 by Vincent Woodstock. A specification of the organ can be found on the National Pipe Organ Register.
