= Zena Skinner =

British chef and writer

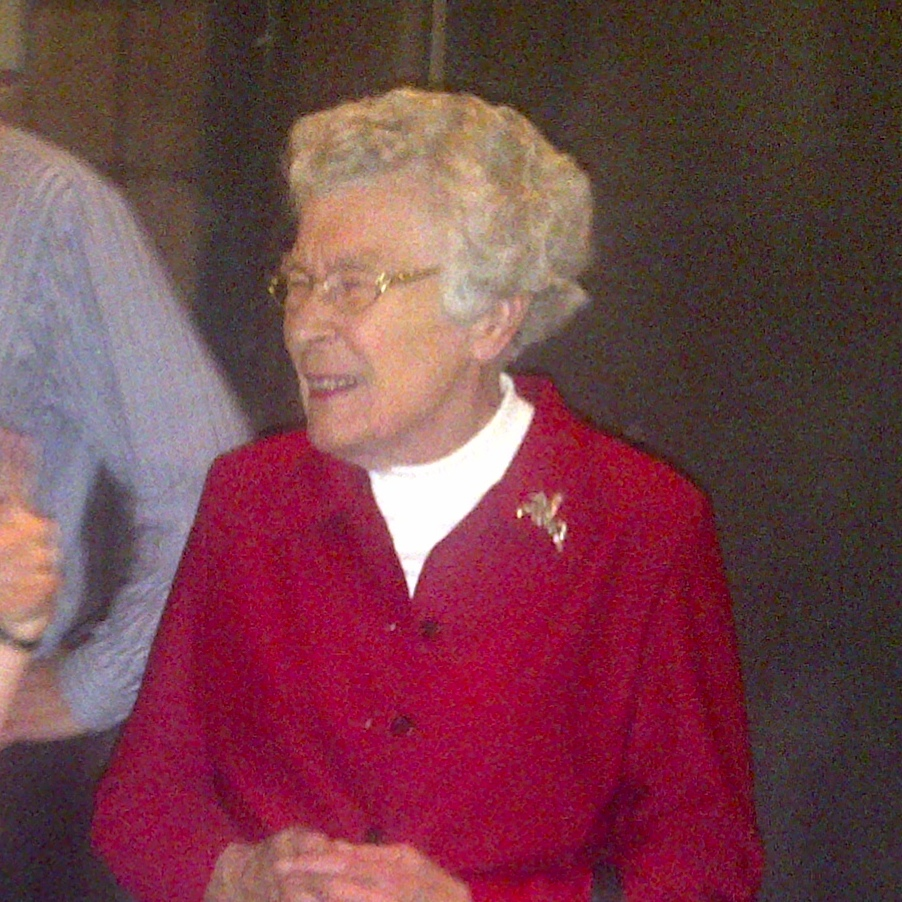
- in 2011
- Born: 27 February 1927; Luton, Bedfordshire, England
- Died: 6 March 2018 (aged 91); Luton, Bedfordshire, England
- Occupations: Television presenter, chef, writer

Zena Skinner (27 February 1927 – 6 March 2018) was a British chef, writer, and cookery expert on television and radio.

== Early life ==
Skinner was from Luton, Bedfordshire. Her father owned an electroplating company.

== Career ==
Skinner served in the Women's Royal Naval Service and decoded signals at Portsmouth during World War II. After the war, she worked as a demonstrator at the Eastern Electricity Board showroom in Royston; she also demonstrated electrical appliances in Jamaica and East Africa. While working in Kenya, she met Queen Elizabeth II, and her appearance in publicity photos, serving cakes to Maasai men, led her into television work.

Her first TV appearance was in 1959. She presented daytime cookery programmes for the BBC through the 1960s and 1970s and later, Channel 4. Her style tended to the homely and economical, "relaxed and friendly", without fancy techniques or exotic ingredients. She also contributed to the Radio Times, and wrote several cookery books, including Zena Skinner's Book of Recipes (1968) and Zena Skinner's Down to Earth Cookbook (1982).

Skinner was a brand ambassador for Tupperware products. In 1970 she appeared in a Sainsbury's film, "Quick Change", about shopping and the change to decimal currency. She appeared as a castaway on the BBC Radio programme Desert Island Discs, on 3 March 1969. She founded a charity, Keech Hospice Care, in Luton and raised funds for it.

== Personal life ==
Skinner retired from television in 1989 and lived in Redbourn, Hertfordshire. She died on 6 March 2018, aged 91, a year after her brother Bruce, at the hospice they both supported in Luton.
