= 2019 St Albans City and District Council election =

Election

| ← 2018 | 2 May 2019 | 2021 → |

21 of the 58 seats to St Albans City and District Council 30 seats needed for a majority
| | First party | Second party | Third party |
|---|---|---|---|
| Party | Liberal Democrats | Conservative | Labour |
| Seats before | 18 | 30 | 6 |
| Seats won | 7 | Steady | 0 |
| Seats after | 25 | 23 | 6 |
| Seat change | ▲7 | ▼8 | Steady |
| Popular vote | 17,971 | 12,943 | 6,247 |
| Percentage | 42.1% | 30.3% | 14.6% |
| | Fourth party | Fifth party |
| Party | Independent | Green |
| Seats before | 2 | 1 |
| Seats won | 1 | 0 |
| Seats after | 3 | 1 |
| Seat change | ▲1 | Steady |
| Popular vote | 1,153 | 4,343 |
| Percentage | 2.7% | 10.3% |
- Winner in each ward for the 2019 St Albans City and District Council election
Council control before election
Conservative
Council control after election
No overall control

The 2019 St Albans City and District Council election took place on 2 May 2019 to elect members of St Albans City and District Council in England. This was on the same day as other local elections. At the elections, the Conservatives lost control of the council

== Results summary ==
42,657

St Albans City and District Council election, 2019
| Party | Seats | Gains | Losses | Net gain/loss | Seats % | Votes % | Votes | +/− |
|---|---|---|---|---|---|---|---|---|
| Liberal Democrats | 25 | 7 | 0 | ▲7 | | 42.1 | 17,971 | ▲7.2 |
| Conservative | 23 | 0 | 8 | ▼8 | | 30.3 | 12,943 | ▼7.9 |
| Labour | 6 | 1 | 1 | Steady | | 14.6 | 6,247 | ▼4.7 |
| Independent | 3 | 1 | 0 | ▲1 | | 2.7 | 1,153 | ▲2.2 |
| Green | 1 | 0 | 0 | Steady | | 10.3 | 4,343 | ▲3.5 |

== Aftermath ==
The Conservatives lost the majority control of the council that they had held for four years, since 2015. Casualties of the election included the incumbent Conservative council leader, Alec Campbell, who lost his seat in a landslide.

At the full council meeting on 22 May, the Liberal Democrats formed a minority administration, which was voted into power by a margin of 27-22, with eight Labour and Independent councillors abstaining. Alongside the Liberal Democrat councillors, the one Green councillor voted in favour of the Lib Dem administration.

== Ward results ==
=== Ashley ===
Ashley
| Party | Candidate | Votes | % | ±% |
|---|---|---|---|---|
| Liberal Democrats | Iqbal Zia | 1,411 | 56.0 | −1.8 |
| Labour | Mohammed Mortuza | 556 | 22.1 | −0.8 |
| Green | Stephane Farenga | 308 | 12.2 | +6.2 |
| Conservative | Yasmin-May Harisha | 244 | 9.7 | −3.7 |
| Majority | | 855 | 33.9 | −1.0 |
| Liberal Democrats hold | | Swing | | |

=== Batchwood ===
Batchwood
| Party | Candidate | Votes | % | ±% |
|---|---|---|---|---|
| Liberal Democrats | Liz Needham | 878 | 39.5 | +16.2 |
| Labour | Gordon Baisley | 755 | 33.9 | −16.3 |
| Conservative | Alex Harisha-Clark | 381 | 17.1 | −3.5 |
| Green | Anne McQuade | 210 | 9.4 | +3.9 |
| Majority | | 123 | 5.6 | −21.3 |
| Liberal Democrats gain from Conservative | | Swing | | |

=== Clarence ===
Clarence
| Party | Candidate | Votes | % | ±% |
|---|---|---|---|---|
| Liberal Democrats | Danny Clare | 1,521 | 63.9 | +6.1 |
| Conservative | Don Deepthi | 357 | 15.0 | −7.5 |
| Green | Catherine Michel | 252 | 10.6 | +3.9 |
| Labour | Jagat Chatrath | 249 | 10.5 | −2.5 |
| Majority | | 1,164 | 48.9 | +13.6 |
| Liberal Democrats hold | | Swing | | |

=== Colney Heath ===
Colney Heath
| Party | Candidate | Votes | % | ±% |
|---|---|---|---|---|
| Liberal Democrats | Chris Brazier | 1,022 | 57.6 | +4.5 |
| Conservative | Susan Devi | 421 | 23.7 | −3.3 |
| Labour | Andrew Osborne | 174 | 9.8 | −5.3 |
| Green | James Ryan | 157 | 8.9 | +4.0 |
| Majority | | 601 | 33.9 | +7.8 |
| Liberal Democrats hold | | Swing | | |

=== Cunningham ===
Cunningham
| Party | Candidate | Votes | % | ±% |
|---|---|---|---|---|
| Liberal Democrats | Robert Donald | 1,132 | 54.6 | +16.8 |
| Labour | Muhammad Rahim | 426 | 20.5 | −7.5 |
| Conservative | Sarah Tallon | 372 | 17.9 | −7.7 |
| Green | Greg Blom | 145 | 7.0 | +2.1 |
| Majority | | 706 | 34.1 | +24.3 |
| Liberal Democrats hold | | Swing | | |

=== Harpenden East ===
Harpenden East
| Party | Candidate | Votes | % | ±% |
|---|---|---|---|---|
| Conservative | Geoffrey Newman | 658 | 32.6 | −19.5 |
| Liberal Democrats | Pip Liver | 608 | 30.1 | +0.1 |
| Independent | Anne James | 406 | 20.1 | N/A |
| Labour | James Gill | 179 | 8.9 | −9.0 |
| Green | Angela Troughton | 168 | 8.3 | N/A |
| Majority | | 50 | 2.5 | −19.6 |
| Conservative hold | | Swing | | |

=== Harpenden North ===
Harpenden North
| Party | Candidate | Votes | % | ±% |
|---|---|---|---|---|
| Conservative | Bert Pawle | 818 | 44.9 | −6.1 |
| Liberal Democrats | Melanie Priggen | 633 | 34.8 | +4.4 |
| Green | Ian Troughton | 200 | 11.0 | +5.0 |
| Labour | Emily Tilly | 169 | 9.3 | −3.2 |
| Majority | | 185 | 10.1 | −10.5 |
| Conservative hold | | Swing | | |

=== Harpenden South ===
Harpenden South
| Party | Candidate | Votes | % | ±% |
|---|---|---|---|---|
| Conservative | Brian Ellis | 994 | 54.2 | −10.1 |
| Liberal Democrats | Zoe Frances Galvin | 382 | 20.8 | +3.8 |
| Green | Rosalind Paul | 230 | 12.5 | +7.1 |
| Labour | George Fraser | 227 | 12.4 | −0.9 |
| Majority | | 612 | 33.4 | −13.9 |
| Conservative hold | | Swing | | |

=== Harpenden West ===
Harpenden West
| Party | Candidate | Votes | % | ±% |
|---|---|---|---|---|
| Conservative | Roger Butterworth | 1,122 | 49.5 | −8.7 |
| Liberal Democrats | Jeffrey Phillips | 622 | 27.4 | +4.0 |
| Green | Lesley Baker | 311 | 13.7 | +8.4 |
| Labour | Henry Meredith | 212 | 9.4 | −3.8 |
| Majority | | 500 | 22.1 | −12.7 |
| Conservative hold | | Swing | | |

=== London Colney ===
London Colney
| Party | Candidate | Votes | % | ±% |
|---|---|---|---|---|
| Labour | Helen Pakenham | 855 | 38.9 | ±0.0 |
| Conservative | Liz Winstone | 749 | 34.1 | +2.5 |
| Liberal Democrats | Tony Lillico | 403 | 18.4 | +2.5 |
| Green | Mark Park-Crowne | 189 | 8.6 | +4.2 |
| Majority | | 106 | 4.8 | −2.5 |
| Labour gain from Conservative | | Swing | | |

=== Marshalswick North ===
Marshalswick North
| Party | Candidate | Votes | % | ±% |
|---|---|---|---|---|
| Liberal Democrats | Clare Julien | 1,223 | 57.2 | +11.7 |
| Conservative | Lyn Bolton | 549 | 25.7 | −9.3 |
| Green | James Lomas | 193 | 9.0 | +3.3 |
| Labour | Alexander Veitch | 173 | 8.1 | −5.7 |
| Majority | | 674 | 31.5 | +21.0 |
| Liberal Democrats gain from Conservative | | Swing | | |

=== Marshalswick South ===
Marshalswick South
| Party | Candidate | Votes | % | ±% |
|---|---|---|---|---|
| Liberal Democrats | Karen Young | 1,461 | 53.7 | +12.5 |
| Conservative | Salih Gaygusuz | 833 | 30.6 | −3.7 |
| Labour | Richard Harris | 225 | 8.3 | −8.5 |
| Green | Susana Garcia-Martinez | 204 | 7.5 | +2.1 |
| Majority | | 628 | 23.1 | +16.2 |
| Liberal Democrats gain from Conservative | | Swing | | |

=== Park Street ===
Park Street
| Party | Candidate | Votes | % | ±% |
|---|---|---|---|---|
| Liberal Democrats | Syed Abidi | 866 | 43.6 | +3.5 |
| Conservative | Claudio Duran | 710 | 35.8 | −8.2 |
| Green | Sally Leonard | 211 | 10.6 | +6.9 |
| Labour | Gary Chambers | 198 | 10.0 | −2.3 |
| Majority | | 156 | 7.8 | +3.9 |
| Liberal Democrats gain from Conservative | | Swing | | |

=== Redbourn ===
Redbourn
| Party | Candidate | Votes | % | ±% |
|---|---|---|---|---|
| Independent | David Mitchell | 747 | 41.2 | N/A |
| Conservative | Ed Webster | 586 | 32.3 | −29.1 |
| Labour | Symon Vergo | 245 | 13.5 | −5.0 |
| Liberal Democrats | Will Jankowski | 234 | 12.9 | +0.4 |
| Majority | | 161 | 8.9 | −34.0 |
| Independent gain from Conservative | | Swing | | |

=== Sandridge ===
Sandridge
| Party | Candidate | Votes | % | ±% |
|---|---|---|---|---|
| Conservative | Frances Leonard | 689 | 48.0 | −3.2 |
| Liberal Democrats | Sharon Hollingsworth | 394 | 27.4 | +5.8 |
| Green | Matthew Maddock | 199 | 13.9 | +2.7 |
| Labour | Jonathan Hegerty | 154 | 10.7 | −5.3 |
| Majority | | 295 | 20.6 | −9.0 |
| Conservative hold | | Swing | | |

=== Sopwell ===
Sopwell
| Party | Candidate | Votes | % | ±% |
|---|---|---|---|---|
| Liberal Democrats | Emma Matanle | 1,050 | 46.5 | −2.8 |
| Liberal Democrats | Mandy McNeil | 1,018 | 45.1 | −4.2 |
| Labour | Iain Grant | 729 | 32.3 | −1.6 |
| Labour | Eileen Harris | 720 | 31.9 | −1.4 |
| Conservative | Barry Sumpter | 233 | 10.3 | −2.9 |
| Conservative | Graham Leonard | 215 | 9.5 | −3.7 |
| Green | Lucy Swift | 208 | 9.2 | +5.1 |
| Green | Phil Fletcher | 189 | 8.4 | +4.3 |
| Majority | | 289 | 12.8 | −3.2 |
| Liberal Democrats hold | | Swing | | |
| Liberal Democrats gain from Labour | | Swing | | |

=== St Peters ===
St Peters
| Party | Candidate | Votes | % | ±% |
|---|---|---|---|---|
| Liberal Democrats | Will Tucker | 1,365 | 51.9 | +20.4 |
| Conservative | Alec Campbell | 505 | 19.2 | −7.5 |
| Green | Jill Mills | 495 | 18.9 | −10.2 |
| Labour | Mark Ewington | 260 | 9.9 | −2.7 |
| Majority | | 860 | 32.7 | +30.3 |
| Liberal Democrats gain from Conservative | | Swing | | |

=== St Stephen ===
St Stephen
| Party | Candidate | Votes | % | ±% |
|---|---|---|---|---|
| Conservative | Dave Winstone | 1,006 | 52.8 | −10.7 |
| Liberal Democrats | Sinead Howland | 527 | 27.7 | +5.7 |
| Green | Caroline Hall | 217 | 11.4 | +6.8 |
| Labour | Janet Blackwell | 154 | 8.1 | −1.8 |
| Majority | | 479 | 25.1 | −16.4 |
| Conservative hold | | Swing | | |

=== Verulam ===
Verulam
| Party | Candidate | Votes | % | ±% |
|---|---|---|---|---|
| Liberal Democrats | Stephen Barrett | 1,529 | 55.4 | −1.1 |
| Conservative | Paul Verity | 865 | 31.3 | +0.9 |
| Green | Candy Whittome | 213 | 7.7 | +3.7 |
| Labour | Michael Bartlet | 153 | 5.5 | −3.6 |
| Majority | | 664 | 24.1 | −2.0 |
| Liberal Democrats gain from Conservative | | Swing | | |

=== Wheathampstead ===
Wheathampstead
| Party | Candidate | Votes | % | ±% |
|---|---|---|---|---|
| Conservative | Sandra Wood | 851 | 43.7 | −22.4 |
| Liberal Democrats | Gerard Panting | 710 | 36.4 | +22.1 |
| Green | Oliver Hitch | 233 | 12.0 | +4.5 |
| Labour | Neil Sankey | 154 | 7.9 | −4.2 |
| Majority | | 141 | 7.3 | −44.5 |
| Conservative hold | | Swing | | |

== By-elections between 2019 and 2021 ==
A by-election was held in Clarence on 3 October 2019, after the resignation of Liberal Democrat councillor Caroline Brooke. The seat was held by the new Liberal Democrat candidate, Josie Madoc.

Clarence by-election, 3rd October 2019
| Party | Candidate | Votes | % | ±% |
|---|---|---|---|---|
| Liberal Democrats | Josie Madoc | 1,177 | 68.8 | +4.9 |
| Conservative | Don Deepthi | 314 | 18.4 | +3.4 |
| Labour | Gary Chambers | 112 | 6.5 | −4.0 |
| Green | Rebecca Michel | 107 | 6.3 | −4.3 |
| Majority | | 863 | 50.4 | |
| Liberal Democrats hold | | Swing | | |
