= Emma Tatham =

English poet

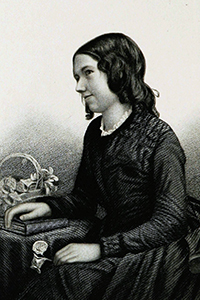
Portrait of Emma Tatham (cropped) by John Cochran

Emma Tatham (31 October 1829 – 4 September 1855) was a 19th-century English poet. Her work is seldom read today, but she was regarded in the Victorian era as a prodigy and a poetic genius.

== Life ==
Tatham was born near Gray's Inn, London, to George and Ann Tatham, and educated at Miss Jolly's school in Great Ormond Street up to the age of 16. Her older sister had died before she was born. Her biographer, a Methodist minister and family friend, states (pp. 3 and 7) that her father's family came from West Witton, North Yorkshire, and kept an upholstery shop in Holborn. Her mother came from Kent.

The family moved to 7 Addington Square, Margate in 1847, largely for the sake of Emma's health (p. 35). She began to write poetry early, and from the age of 16 to 18, she rapidly wrote an abundance of poems. A collection of these appeared in 1854 as The Dream of Pythagoras and Other Poems and was reprinted at least three times. Thereafter some critics compared her to Mary Shelley.

== Praise from Arnold ==
Matthew Arnold wrote in praise of her. He compared her with the French poet Eugénie de Guérin, and remarked elsewhere that "she had a sincere vein of poetical feeling, a genuine aptitude for composition." As she was then a Protestant who resided in Margate, she was further described by Arnold as a "fervid Christian".

A book of verse dedicated to Tatham was published in 1857 as Etchings and Pearls; or, a Flower Planted on the Grave of Emma Tatham, by Mrs. J. Cooke Westbrook. A biography of her by the Methodist minister Benjamin Gregory (1820–1900) appeared after her death.

Emma Tatham died in 1855 while on a visit to Redbourn, Hertfordshire, and was buried there in the graveyard of the Independent Chapel.
