= Over Wallop =

Village and parish in Hampshire, England

Coordinates: 51.143600°N 1.596915°W

- Location within Hampshire
- Population: 2,182 (2011 Census. including Middle Wallop)
- OS grid reference: SU2829438337
- Civil parish: Over Wallop
- District: Test Valley
- Shire county: Hampshire
- Region: South East
- Country: England
- Sovereign state: United Kingdom
- Post town: STOCKBRIDGE
- Postcode district: SO20
- Dialling code: 01264
- Police: Hampshire and Isle of Wight
- Fire: Hampshire and Isle of Wight
- Ambulance: South Central
- UK Parliament: Romsey and Southampton North
- Website: The Wallops

Over Wallop is a small village and civil parish in the Test Valley district of Hampshire, England. The village lies close to the border with Wiltshire, approximately 5.1 miles (8.2 km) northwest of Stockbridge.

Over Wallop is the westernmost of the three villages collectively known as The Wallops, the other two being Middle Wallop and Nether Wallop. The name "Wallop" derives from the Old English words waella and hop, which taken together roughly mean "the valley of springing water". Over Wallop was described in the Domesday Book as the 'other Wallop', smaller than Nether Wallop.

Over Wallop contains the spring that sources a small river known by locals as “The Brook”. “The Brook” is a tributary of the River Test.

A linear earthwork and flint mines are located in the parish. The earthwork, known as the Quarley High Linear band and ditch, was constructed 245 ± 155 BC. The flint mines date to 3983 ± 106 BC.

== Amenities ==
Over Wallop has a small village shop and a family run pub “The White Hart”. The village also has two playing fields, one referred to as “The cricket field” and the other a park next to Evans Close. Anyone who lives in Over Wallop is inside the catchment area for The Wallops Primary School and Test Valley School. Over Wallop also has many bridle tracks for horses. The parish of Over Wallop is in the Diocese of Winchester. St Peter's parish church is of 12th-century origin, but has Victorian features.

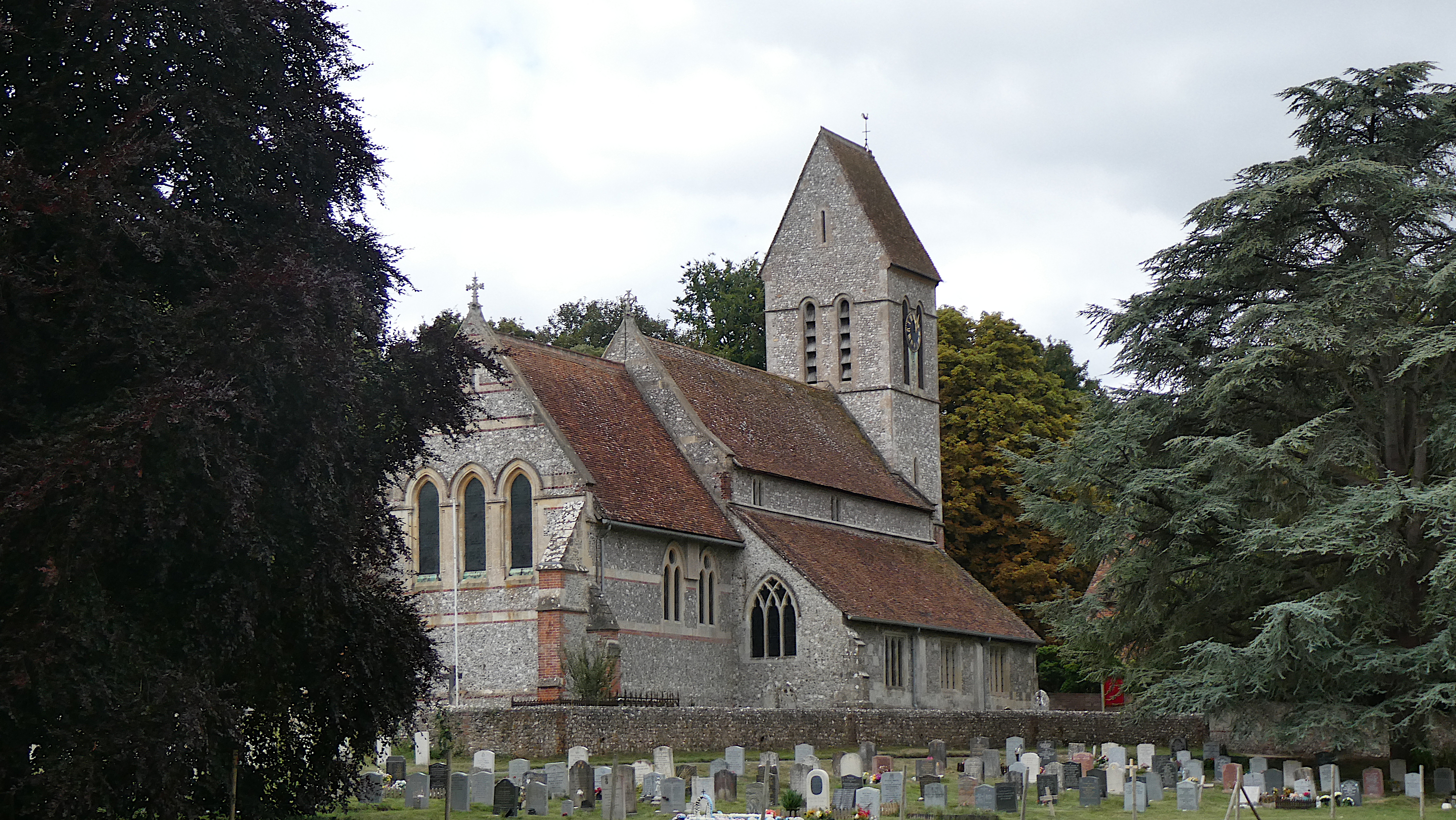
St. Peter's Church at the village of Over Wallop, Hampshire, England.
