= Middle Wallop =

Village in Hampshire, England

Coordinates: 51.1333°N 1.58193°W

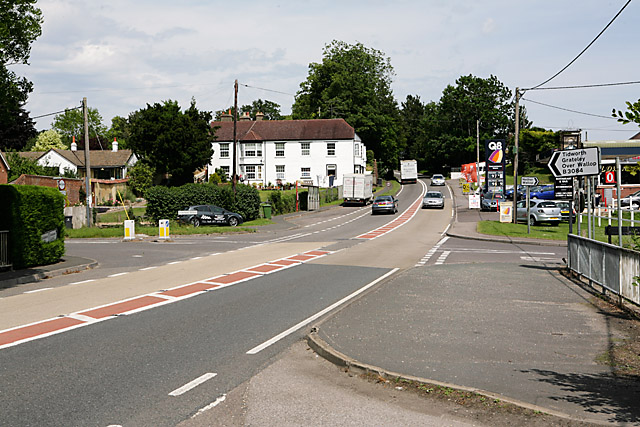
- Middle Wallop crossroads

- Location within Hampshire
- Civil parish: Nether Wallop
- District: Test Valley
- Shire county: Hampshire
- Region: South East
- Country: England
- Sovereign state: United Kingdom
- Post town: STOCKBRIDGE
- Postcode district: SO20
- Dialling code: 01264
- Police: Hampshire and Isle of Wight
- Fire: Hampshire and Isle of Wight
- Ambulance: South Central
- UK Parliament: Romsey and Southampton North

Middle Wallop is a village in the civil parish of Nether Wallop in Hampshire, England, on the A343 road. At the 2011 Census the population was included in the civil parish of Over Wallop. The village has a public house, The George Inn, and a petrol station as well as The Wallops Parish Hall.

== The Wallops ==
Together the villages of Over Wallop, Middle Wallop and Nether Wallop are known as The Wallops and run in a line roughly north to south following the course of the Wallop Brook, which has its source in Over Wallop.

== Middle Wallop airfield ==
To the east of the villages the area is dominated by the Middle Wallop airfield, home to the Army Air Corps, a branch of the British Army. It was supposedly the site of a battle between certain Vitalinus, possibly Vortigern, and Ambrosius Aurelianus.

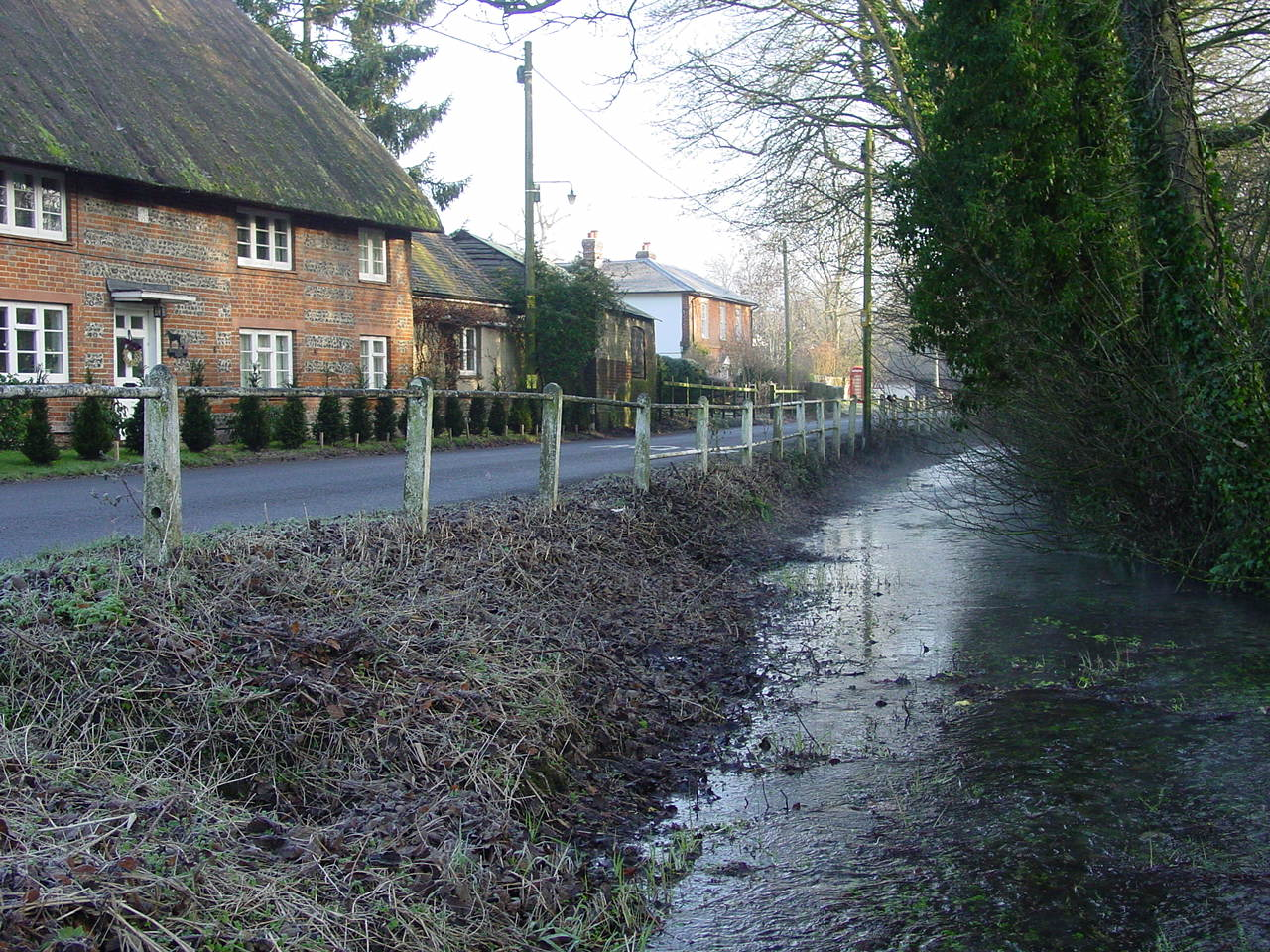
Over Wallop

== Climate ==
Climate data for Middle Wallop (1991–2020 normals, extremes 1984-)
Month	Jan	Feb	Mar	Apr	May	Jun	Jul	Aug	Sep	Oct	Nov	Dec	Year
Record high °C (°F)	15.5 (59.9)	18.1 (64.6)	21.8 (71.2)	26.1 (79.0)	32.5 (90.5)	36.5 (97.7)	35.2 (95.4)	34.9 (94.8)	30.7 (87.3)	26.8 (80.2)	17.4 (63.3)	15.2 (59.4)	36.5 (97.7)
Mean daily maximum °C (°F)	7.8 (46.0)	8.3 (46.9)	10.9 (51.6)	13.9 (57.0)	17.2 (63.0)	20.1 (68.2)	22.2 (72.0)	21.8 (71.2)	19.1 (66.4)	14.9 (58.8)	10.9 (51.6)	8.2 (46.8)	14.6 (58.3)
Daily mean °C (°F)	4.8 (40.6)	5.0 (41.0)	7.0 (44.6)	9.4 (48.9)	12.4 (54.3)	15.2 (59.4)	17.3 (63.1)	17.1 (62.8)	14.6 (58.3)	11.3 (52.3)	7.6 (45.7)	5.2 (41.4)	10.6 (51.1)
Mean daily minimum °C (°F)	1.8 (35.2)	1.8 (35.2)	3.2 (37.8)	4.8 (40.6)	7.7 (45.9)	10.4 (50.7)	12.3 (54.1)	12.4 (54.3)	10.2 (50.4)	7.7 (45.9)	4.4 (39.9)	2.2 (36.0)	6.6 (43.9)
Record low °C (°F)	−10.1 (13.8)	−10.5 (13.1)	−6.3 (20.7)	−3.7 (25.3)	−1.2 (29.8)	1.4 (34.5)	4.9 (40.8)	3.9 (39.0)	0.9 (33.6)	−3.5 (25.7)	−7.6 (18.3)	−10.2 (13.6)	−10.5 (13.1)
Average precipitation mm (inches)	88.3 (3.48)	64.7 (2.55)	59.1 (2.33)	59.0 (2.32)	49.6 (1.95)	52.6 (2.07)	54.2 (2.13)	57.1 (2.25)	58.7 (2.31)	90.4 (3.56)	96.7 (3.81)	89.0 (3.50)	819.4 (32.26)
Average precipitation days (≥ 1.0 mm)	12.5	10.5	9.6	9.8	9.0	8.4	9.1	9.0	8.8	12.1	13.1	12.2	124.2
Source 1: Met Office
Source 2: Starlings Roost Weather
