= Redbourn =

Village and civil parish in Hertfordshire, England

Coordinates: 51.8002°N 0.3965°W

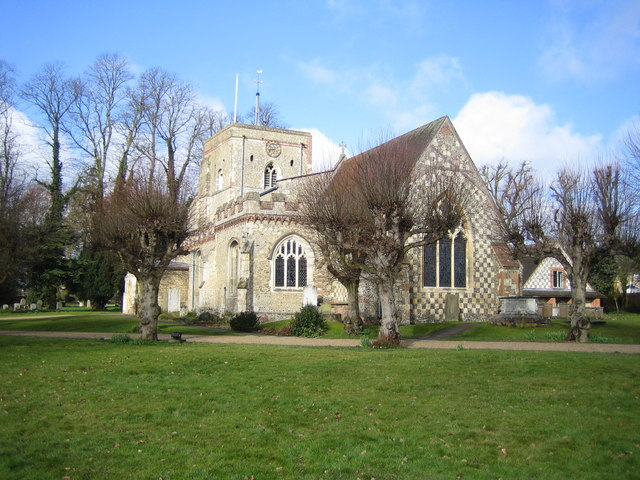
- St Mary's Church, Redbourn

- Location within Hertfordshire
- Area: 7.37 sq mi (19.1 km^{2})
- Population: 5,450 (2021)
  - Density: 739/sq mi (285/km^{2})
- OS grid reference: TL105125
- Civil parish: Redbourn
- District: City of St Albans
- Shire county: Hertfordshire
- Region: East
- Country: England
- Sovereign state: United Kingdom
- Post town: ST ALBANS
- Postcode district: AL3
- Dialling code: 01582
- Police: Hertfordshire
- Fire: Hertfordshire
- Ambulance: East of England
- UK Parliament: Harpenden and Berkhamsted

Redbourn is a village and civil parish in Hertfordshire, England. It is located 3 miles (4.8 km) from Harpenden, 4 miles (6.4 km) from St Albans and 5 miles (8.0 km) from Hemel Hempstead. The civil parish had a population of 6,913 according to the 2011 Census.

== History ==
To the south-west of the village, just beyond the motorway, is the site of an Iron Age hill fort called the Aubreys. Nearby is Aubrey Park, which dates back to the 13th century. To the north of the village is the site of a complex of Roman temples.

The village has been continuously settled in since Saxon times at least and is recorded in the Domesday Book. Its parish church, St Mary's, was built in the early 12th century. Some fifty years later, a small priory was founded half a mile away on Redbourn Common, after the abbot of St Albans Abbey decided to consecrate the ground. Some bones had been found on the spot, reputed to be of St Amphibalus, the priest who had converted St Alban to Christianity.

In the 16th century, the manor of Redbourn belonged to the Reade family. Sir Richard Reade, formerly Lord Chancellor of Ireland, bought the manor when he came back to England from Ireland; he died in 1575 and was buried at the parish church. Reade left legacies to Winchester College and for the upkeep of the parish of Redbourn. The manor of Redbourn itself was inherited by his eldest son, Innocent, who also inherited the older family estate at Nether Wallop.

In 2010, Redbourn's St Mary's Church celebrated its 900th anniversary.

== Governance ==
The three tiers of local government are Redbourn Parish Council, St Albans City & District Council and Hertfordshire County Council.

== Economy ==
For a long time, Redbourn was the centre of a farming community; it had a successful watercress business on the water meadows of the River Ver. Just south of the village, flour was ground at Redbournbury Mill, a recently restored watermill.

Silk throwing was carried out at the steam-driven Woollam's Mill, near Redbourn Common. The mill was taken over by John Mangrove & Son, but closed in 1938. At the outbreak of the Second World War, Brooke Bond took over the silk mill as a food factory. After the closure of the factory in 1996, the old silk mill manager's house, the grade II-listed Silk Mill House was given to Redbourn Parish Council; it became the Redbourn Village Museum, opening in May 2000. The former silk mill site is now a housing estate.

Local grocer Russell Harborough also set up a jam-making factory; in 1956, it was bought by Thomas Mercer Ltd, a marine chronometer manufacturer. The site, just off High Street, is now an industrial estate.

Old industries in the village included making straw plait and hat making. Redbourn Village Hall, in the centre of the village's High Street, was formerly a straw hat factory, which has been extensively renovated, thanks mainly to money from the National Lottery and Redbourn Parish Council.

In 1903, Mr Boucher, the local dentist, owned the first private car in the village, a 6 hp Gladiator. Several motor rallies were held in Redbourn in the 1900s using The Bull pub as a base. Three garages, in High Street, Dunstable Road and at Church End, have closed, leaving only a filling station next to The Chequers pub in the St Albans Road.

== Transport ==
The nearest National Rail stations are at:

- Hemel Hempstead, on the West Coast Main Line. London Northwestern Railway operates services between London Euston and Birmingham New Street.
- Harpenden, on the Midland Main Line. Govia Thameslink Railway operates services between Brighton, London St Pancras and Bedford.

Bus services are operated by Centrebus (South), Red Rose Travel and Red Eagle. Routes connect the village with Borehamwood, Dunstable, Hemel Hempstead, Harpenden, Luton and St Albans.

=== History ===
Owing to its proximity to London, Redbourn became an important coaching station in the 17th and 18th centuries; it was known as the "Street of Inns", with at least 25 pubs and inns at its peak. However, the expansion of the railways in the 1840s sounded the death knell of stagecoaches.

A branch railway line, known as the Nickey Line, connected Hemel Hempstead with Harpenden; it passed through Redbourn. It opened on 16 July 1877 and was closed in 1979. The route is now a shared-use path.

The first idea for a Redbourn by-pass came in 1935 and one was eventually completed in 1984. A by-pass committee was established in May 1978 and objections were examined at a public enquiry held in February 1982.

== Sport ==
Redbourn Cricket Club was formed in about 1823, but records show that organised cricket was played on Redbourn Common some eighty years earlier. Some Hertfordshire County histories record cricket being played there in 1666, which would make the village one of the oldest cricketing locations on record in England.

Redbourn Golf Club is well known for its two golf courses and driving range. The Kinsbourne Course is considered one of the best short courses in Hertfordshire.

== County show ==
The Hertfordshire County Show takes place annually in late May at a 70-acre showground site, one mile north of the village.

== Awards ==
Redbourn has won the following awards:

- Hertfordshire Village of the Year: 2002 (Overall and Western Area Winner) and a section winner in 2003
- Eastern and Home Counties Section winner, 2002
- Hertfordshire Village of the Year, western area, 2004
- Hertfordshire Village of The Year, Information Technology section winner, 2005
- Eastern England Information Communication Technology winner, 2005
- Hertfordshire Village of the Year Best Community Project award, 2005
- Anglia in Bloom, Silver Award, 2005.

== Notable people ==
In order of birth:

- Saint Amphibalus (died 25 June 304 AD), who converted Saint Alban, was martyred at Redbourn
- Elizabeth Howard, Duchess of Norfolk (1494–1558), after the break-up of her marriage to Thomas Howard 3rd Duke of Norfolk, was sent to Redbourn, where she claimed, "the duke locked me up in a chamber and took away my jewels and apparels"
- Sir Richard Reade (1511–1575), Lord Chancellor of Ireland
- Henry Stephens (1796–1864), doctor/surgeon, chemist and businessman, invented an improved formula for blue-black ink and set up a company to market it
- Emma Tatham (1829–1855), English poet, died while on a visit to the minister of the Independent Chapel and was buried in its graveyard
- Henry Charles Stephens (1841–1918), Henry Stephens' son, developed the ink business and became a Conservative Party politician and philanthropist.
- Zena Skinner (1927–2018), chef, writer and cookery expert on television and radio
- Ron Henry (1934–2014), professional footballer with Tottenham Hotspur
- Gordon Beningfield (1936–1998), wildlife artist
- Michael Christopher "Mick" Luckhurst (born 1958), an American football placekicker, who played for the Atlanta Falcons, was born in Redbourn. He presented Channel Four's american football coverage from 1987 to 1991
- Louise Lear (1968), BBC weather forecaster, lives at Redbourn.

== See also ==
- Abbeys and priories in England
- Nickey Line
- Redbournbury Mill
