= Richard Reade =

English-born judge

Sir Richard Reade (1511–1576) was an English-born judge in sixteenth-century Ireland, who held the office of Lord Chancellor of Ireland.

== Background and early career ==
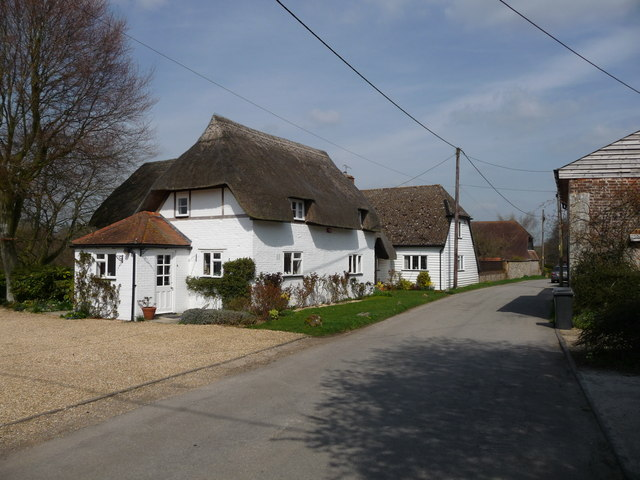
Nether Wallop, where Richard Reade was born, present day.

He was born at Nether Wallop in Hampshire, second son of Richard Reade (died 1555), Lord of the Manor of Wallop, and his wife Margaret. He was educated at Winchester College and New College, Oxford, where he became a fellow in 1528. He took the degrees of Bachelor of Civil Law at Oxford in 1537 and Doctor of Civil Law at the same university in 1540. He quickly acquired a reputation as "a man of learning and experience". He was made a Master of Chancery and undertook a crucial trade mission to Flanders. He was knighted in 1544.

== Lord Chancellor of Ireland and later life ==
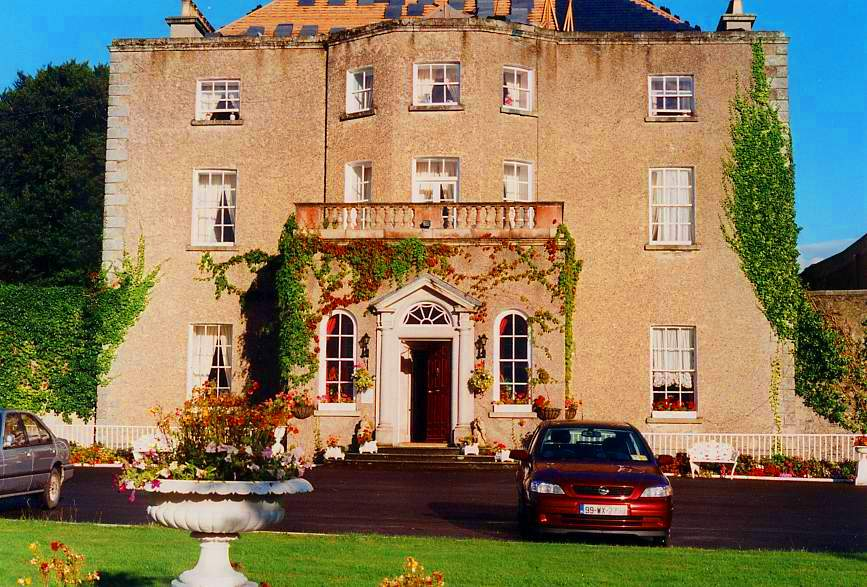
Moyglare Manor, present day

In 1546 Sir John Alan, the Lord Chancellor of Ireland, was removed from office on a charge of corruption, and Reade was sent to Ireland to replace him. He was granted a house in the precincts of St. Patrick's Cathedral, and the manor of Moyglare near Maynooth, County Kildare. In 1548 Alan was reinstated as chancellor. Reade returned to England, where he became Master of Requests. He later purchased the manors of Redbourn near St. Albans and Tangley near Andover.

== Death and family ==
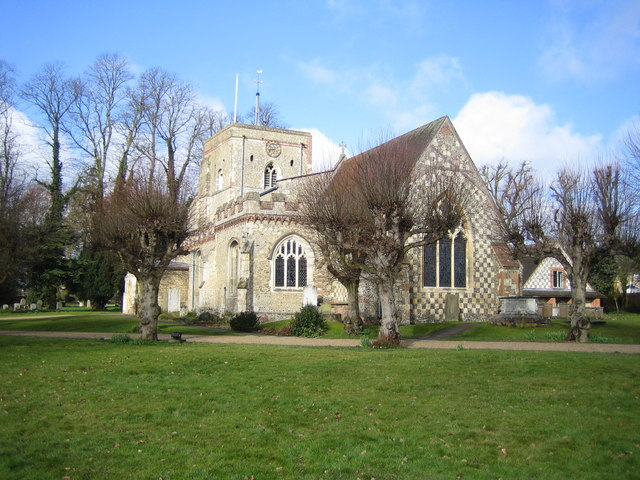
Reade was buried at St. Mary's Parish Church, Redbourn

He died on 11 July 1576 and was buried at St Mary's Church, Redbourn. He left legacies to Winchester College and for the upkeep of the parish of Redbourn. The manor of Redbourn itself was inherited by his eldest son Innocent, who also inherited the older family estate at Nether Wallop. His second son John died at the age of nineteen, while his third son Andrew became a substantial landowner in Hampshire, acquiring the manors of Linkenholt and Faccombe.

Richard's wife was Anne Tregonwell, daughter of the prominent jurist Sir John Tregonwell of Milton Abbas, Dorset, and his first wife Elizabeth Newce. In addition to the above-mentioned sons, they had a daughter, Anne, who married a Mr. Wilgosse.

== Character ==
Ball praises Reade as a man of great learning, though O'Flanagan adds that little judicial business was transacted in the Lord Chancellor's Court during his tenure of that office.
