= Dunn & Co. =

British menswear retailer

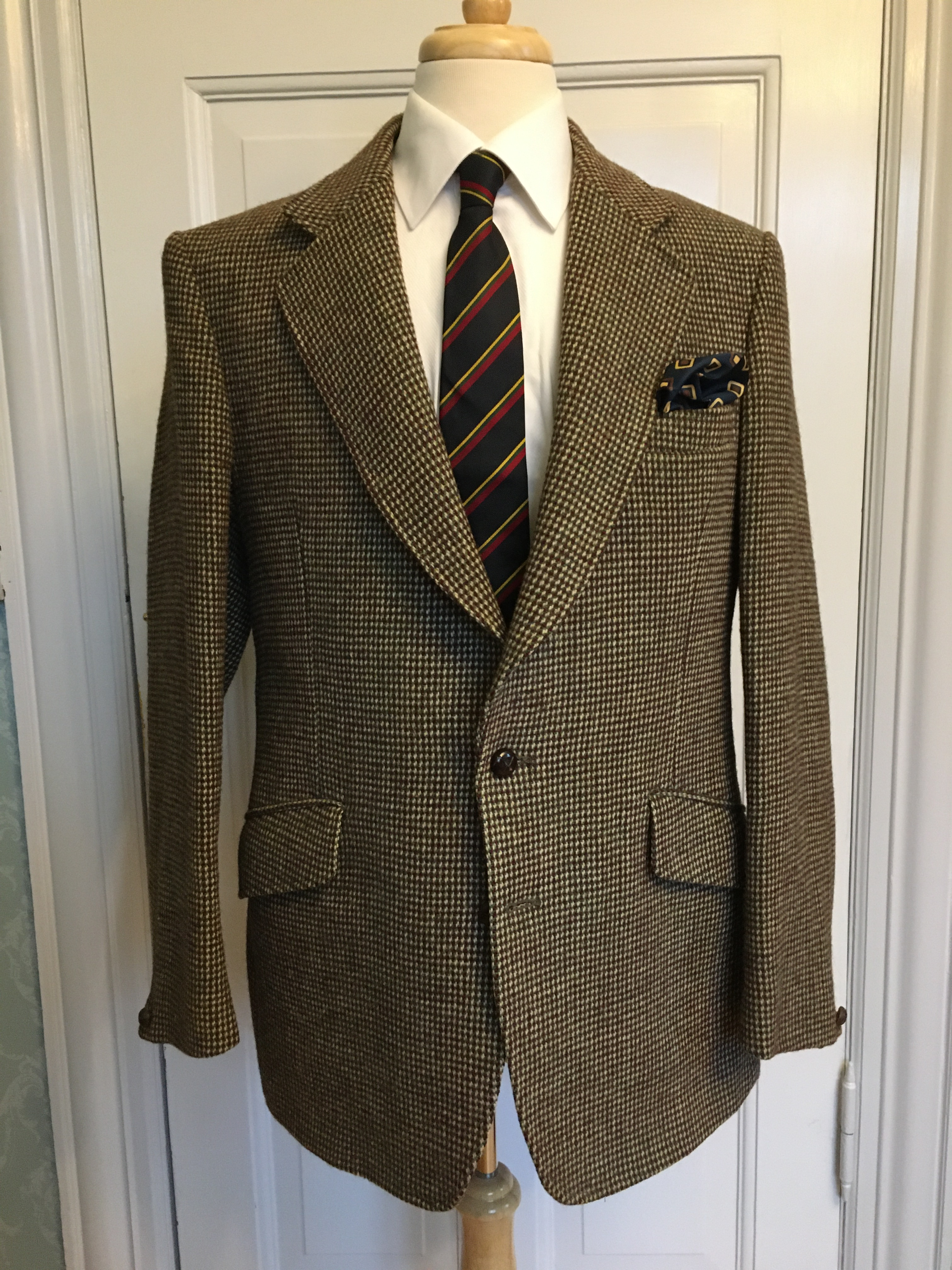
Jacket from Dunn & Co. made of Harris Tweed.

Dunn & Co. was a well known British chain of menswear retailers.

== History ==
Dunn & Co. was founded in 1887 by George Arthur Dunn, a Quaker, who started by selling hats on the streets of Birmingham. Forty years later he had two hundred hat shops and as many franchises in other stores. These gradually developed into a string of High Street stores specialising in formal wear, especially suits, blazers, tweed sports jackets and flannels.

The company was a stalwart of the British High Street, but found it increasingly difficult to remain relevant in the fast changing retail environment of the 1980s: as new and innovative retailers opened up – with Next for men being a prime example - it struggled to adapt. The company engaged the services of management consultants PricewaterhouseCoopers in a bid to revitalise and refocus, but the programme they initiated failed to make the significant changes necessary to ensure long-term survival.

In 1991 Dunn & Co gave Ayr-House an option to buy the company in a deal thought to value the company at approximately £50 million. The Ayr-House deal was instigated and led by businessman Robert Lees with backing from Nomura (The Daily Telegraph, 1 May 1991 and 9 May 1991).

The group trading started showing serious problems in 1991, with nearly forty shops being sold to Hodges, a private Welsh group which kept the Dunn & Co. name going. In 1994 a majority stake was sold to venture capitalists CinVen, who appointed Anthony Phillips and Jim Bellingham to run the chain.

== Demise ==
In its final year of trading as an independent company, 1996, Dunn & Co. had 130 shops and 429 staff, with a head office in Swansea employing a further 75 workers.

It was losing £1m a year on sales of £25m a year, and when its debts reached £6.4m (with £4m owed to unsecured creditors), CinVen, who by then owned 86% of the company, called in the receivers KPMG, on 19 December 1996.

The brand name was purchased by Ciro Citterio. However, they also went into administration in 2003.
