= Nether Wallop =

Village and parish in Hampshire, England

Coordinates: 51.1276°N 1.5732°W

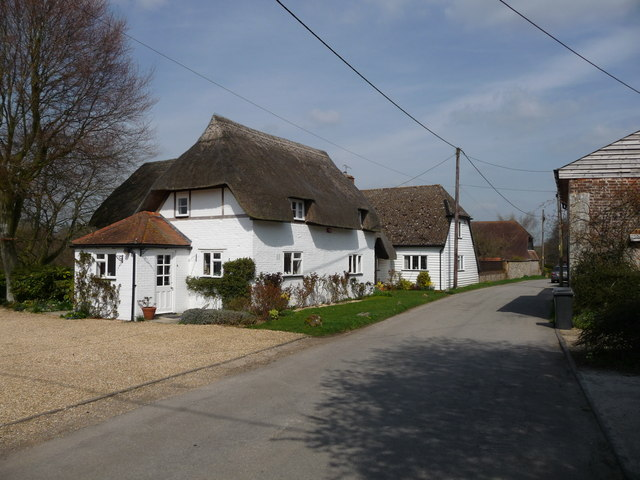
- Thatched cottage

- Location within Hampshire
- Population: 802 (2021 census)
- OS grid reference: SU300366
- Civil parish: Nether Wallop
- District: Test Valley
- Shire county: Hampshire
- Region: South East
- Country: England
- Sovereign state: United Kingdom
- Post town: Stockbridge
- Postcode district: SO20
- Dialling code: 01264
- Police: Hampshire and Isle of Wight
- Fire: Hampshire and Isle of Wight
- Ambulance: South Central
- UK Parliament: Romsey and Southampton North
- Website: The Wallops

Nether Wallop is a village and civil parish in the Test Valley district of Hampshire, England, 3.5 miles (5.6 kilometres) northwest of Stockbridge, and 7 miles (11 kilometres) southwest of Andover.

Nether Wallop is the easternmost of the three villages collectively known as The Wallops, the other two being Over Wallop and Middle Wallop. The name "Wallop" derives from the Old English words waella and hop, which taken together roughly mean "the valley of springing water".

The village was the site of the Battle of Guoloph that took place around 440 CE. The element "Wallop" is first attested in the Domesday Book of 1086 as "Wallope", while Nether Wallop is first attested as "Wollop inferior" in Episcopal Registers c. 1270.

Nether Wallop contains many old thatched cottages, and has been featured in books and TV programmes as one of the prettiest villages in England. In particular, Dane Cottage in Five Bells Lane was used as Miss Marple's home in the village of St. Mary Mead for the BBC TV adaptations of the Agatha Christie novels. The house and many of the surrounding lanes within the village were used as the setting and are commonly seen throughout many of the Miss Marple films.

Sir Richard Reade (1511–1575), Lord Chancellor of Ireland, was a native of Nether Wallop, where his family were Lords of the Manor for several generations.

British Olympic skater and Hollywood movie star Belita (Belita Gladys Lyne Jepson-Turner) as born at Garlogs in Nether Wallop in 1923.

The conductor Leopold Stokowski died at his home in Nether Wallop on 13 September 1977.

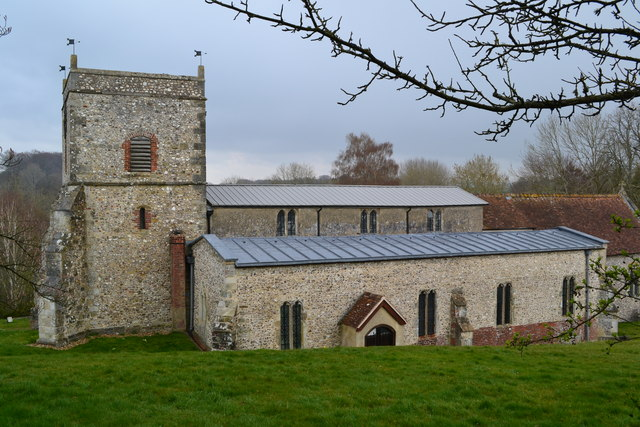
St Andrews Church, Nether Wallop, Hampshire

The church of St Andrew is partly Anglo-Saxon, and fragments of frescoes dating to that period have been discovered. It was designated as a grade I listed building in 1957.

== Demographics ==
Census population of Nether Wallop parish
Census	Population	Female	Male	Households	Source
2001	829	449	380	332	
2011	876	464	412	354	
2021	802	416	386	345	
