= 2022 St Albans City and District Council election =

English local election

- 5 May 2022

All 56 seats to St Albans City and District Council 29 seats needed for a majority

	First party	Second party
Party	Liberal Democrats	Conservative
Last election	30 seats, 41.2%	22 seats, 34.3%
Seats won	50	4
Seat change	▲20	▼18
Popular vote	28,208	14,153
Percentage	47.9%	24.0%
Swing	▲6.7%	▼10.3%
	Third party	Fourth party
Party	Green	Independent
Last election	1 seat, 12.0%	0 seats, 1.2%
Seats won	1	1
Seat change	Steady	▲1
Popular vote	8,769	1,457
Percentage	14.9%	2.5%
Swing	▲2.9%	▲1.3%
- Winner of each seat at the 2022 St Albans City and District Council election
Council control before election
Liberal Democrats
Council control after election
Liberal Democrats

The 2022 St Albans City and District Council election took place on 5 May 2022, to elect members of St Albans City and District Council in England. It was on the same day as other local elections.

The whole council was up for election on new boundaries. At the election, the Liberal Democrats retained control of the council with a greatly increased majority, while Labour were eliminated from the council entirely.

== Summary ==
=== Election result ===
2022 St Albans City and District Council election
Party	Candidates	Seats	Gains	Losses	Net gain/loss	Seats %	Votes %	Votes	+/−
Liberal Democrats	54	50	20	0	▲20	89.3	47.9	28,208	+6.7
Conservative	41	4	0	18	▼18	7.1	24.0	14,153	–10.3
Green	38	1	0	0	Steady	1.8	14.9	8,769	+2.9
Independent	3	1	1	0	▲1	1.8	2.5	1,457	+1.3
Labour	25	0	0	3	▼3	0.0	10.4	6,156	–0.7
CPA	1	0	0	0	Steady	0.0	0.2	127	N/A
Communist	1	0	0	0	Steady	0.0	0.1	75	N/A

== Ward results ==
Candidates seeking re-election are marked with an asterisk (*).

=== Batchwood ===
Batchwood (3)
Party	Candidate	Votes	%	±%
Liberal Democrats	Liz Needham*	1,499	60.1	
Liberal Democrats	Sinéad Howland*	1,441	57.8	
Liberal Democrats	Jenni Murray	1,399	56.1	
Labour	Mal Pakenham	499	20.0	
Labour	Iain Grant	494	19.8	
Conservative	Louise Tallon	462	18.5	
Green	Danielle Durant-Taylor	369	14.8	
Green	Lucy Swift	368	14.8	
Turnout		2,493	44.34	
Liberal Democrats hold		Swing		
Liberal Democrats hold		Swing		
Liberal Democrats gain from Labour		Swing		

=== Bernards Heath ===
Bernards Heath (3)
Party	Candidate	Votes	%	±%
Liberal Democrats	Helen Campbell*	1,846	68.5	
Liberal Democrats	Jez Levy	1,503	55.7	
Liberal Democrats	Mangala Patil Mead	1,326	49.2	
Green	Nadia Bishara	768	28.5	
Conservative	Ambrose Killen	570	21.1	
Labour	Jane Cloak	330	12.2	
Green	Stephane Farenga	294	10.9	
Green	Pam Maisey	288	10.7	
Turnout		2,696	46.65	
Liberal Democrats win (new seat)				
Liberal Democrats win (new seat)				
Liberal Democrats win (new seat)				

=== Clarence ===
Clarence (3)
Party	Candidate	Votes	%	±%
Liberal Democrats	Josie Madoc*	2,045	66.0	
Liberal Democrats	Chris White*	1,910	61.7	
Liberal Democrats	Mark Pedroz*	1,443	46.6	
Green	Matthew Fisher	1,422	45.9	
Labour	Ed Bailey	462	14.9	
Conservative	David Kaloczi	432	13.9	
Green	Gregory Riener	370	11.9	
Green	Gabriel Roberts	361	11.7	
Turnout		3,097	50.78	
Liberal Democrats hold		Swing		
Liberal Democrats hold		Swing		
Liberal Democrats hold		Swing		

=== Colney Heath ===
Colney Heath (1)
Party	Candidate	Votes	%	±%
Liberal Democrats	Chris Brazier*	461	59.1	
Conservative	Graham Leonard	214	27.4	
Green	Rosalind Paul	67	8.6	
Labour	Laurence Chester	38	4.9	
Turnout		784	37.28	
Liberal Democrats hold		Swing		

=== Cunningham ===
Cunningham (3)
Party	Candidate	Votes	%	±%
Liberal Democrats	Robert Donald*	1,679	72.0	
Liberal Democrats	Roly Everall	1,511	64.8	
Liberal Democrats	Geoff Harrison*	1,476	63.3	
Conservative	Rachael Drewitt	451	19.3	
Labour	John Paton	357	15.3	
Green	Caroline Hall	341	14.6	
Green	Phil Fletcher	259	11.1	
Turnout		2,331	41.02	
Liberal Democrats hold		Swing		
Liberal Democrats hold		Swing		
Liberal Democrats hold		Swing		

=== Harpenden East ===
Harpenden East (3)
Party	Candidate	Votes	%	±%
Liberal Democrats	Pip Liver*	1,435	58.1	
Liberal Democrats	Paul de Kort*	1,434	58.1	
Liberal Democrats	Dason Canning	1,293	52.4	
Conservative	Teresa Heritage	859	34.8	
Conservative	Mary Maynard*	859	34.8	
Conservative	Kieran Mitchell	708	28.7	
Green	Ian Troughton	322	13.0	
Labour	Christopher Gillen	220	8.9	
Turnout		2,468	43.28	
Liberal Democrats hold		Swing		
Liberal Democrats hold		Swing		
Liberal Democrats gain from Conservative		Swing		

=== Harpenden North & Rural ===
Harpenden North & Rural (3)
Party	Candidate	Votes	%	±%
Liberal Democrats	Ed Moore	1,610	61.3	
Liberal Democrats	Allison Wren*	1,500	57.1	
Liberal Democrats	Ayesha Rohale	1,264	48.2	
Conservative	Paul Cousin*	861	32.8	
Conservative	Bert Pawle*	846	32.2	
Conservative	Alexia D'Rosario	761	29.0	
Green	Stephen Folwell	243	9.3	
Green	Candy Whittome	221	8.4	
Labour	Linda Spiri	182	6.9	
Turnout		2,625	44.78	
Liberal Democrats win (new seat)				
Liberal Democrats win (new seat)				
Liberal Democrats win (new seat)				

=== Harpenden South ===
Harpenden South (3)
Party	Candidate	Votes	%	±%
Conservative	David Heritage*	1,152	50.1	
Conservative	Brian Ellis*	1,074	46.7	
Conservative	Mark Beashel*	1,056	46.0	
Liberal Democrats	Zoe Galvin	1,030	44.8	
Liberal Democrats	Maddy Liver	812	35.3	
Liberal Democrats	Melanie Priggen	711	30.9	
Green	Sally Leonard	287	12.5	
Labour	David Crew	271	11.8	
Green	Anne McQuade	202	8.8	
Turnout		2,298	41.19	
Conservative hold		Swing		
Conservative hold		Swing		
Conservative hold		Swing		

=== Harpenden West ===
Harpenden West (3)
Party	Candidate	Votes	%	±%
Liberal Democrats	Gill Haynes	1,479	49.7	
Liberal Democrats	John Galvin	1,447	48.7	
Liberal Democrats	Fiona Gaskell	1,318	44.3	
Conservative	Matt Cowley	1,133	38.1	
Conservative	Julian Daly*	1,094	36.8	
Conservative	Susan Griffiths	1,042	35.0	
Green	Kyle Riley	592	19.9	
Green	Louise Schlich	256	8.6	
Labour	Philip Moura	200	6.7	
Green	Julian Wathen	136	4.6	
Turnout		2,973	49.13	
Liberal Democrats gain from Conservative		Swing		
Liberal Democrats gain from Conservative		Swing		
Liberal Democrats gain from Conservative		Swing		

=== Hill End ===
Hill End (3)
Party	Candidate	Votes	%	±%
Liberal Democrats	Jamie Day*	1,798	69.9	
Liberal Democrats	Anthony Rowlands*	1,742	67.8	
Liberal Democrats	Azmat Mughal	1,467	57.1	
Conservative	Sudha Bharadia	405	15.8	
Independent	Peter Cook	364	14.2	
Green	Lesley Baker	336	13.1	
Green	Marianne Jordan	300	11.7	
Labour	Steven Clarke	285	11.1	
Turnout		2,571	46.12	
Liberal Democrats win (new seat)				
Liberal Democrats win (new seat)				
Liberal Democrats win (new seat)				

=== London Colney ===
London Colney (3)
Party	Candidate	Votes	%	±%
Liberal Democrats	Tony Lillico	704	37.4	
Conservative	Simon Calder	637	33.8	
Liberal Democrats	Guy Gampbell	596	31.6	
Labour	Katherine Gardner*	588	31.2	
Conservative	Sarah Tallon*	583	30.9	
Liberal Democrats	Winston Davis	542	28.8	
Conservative	Liz Winstone	523	27.8	
Labour	Jim Hopkins	440	23.4	
Labour	Andy Osborne	419	22.2	
Green	Sarah Gillhespy	171	9.1	
Green	Matthew Maddock	125	6.6	
Turnout		1,884	31.87	
Liberal Democrats gain from Labour		Swing		
Conservative hold		Swing		
Liberal Democrats gain from Labour		Swing		

=== Marshalswick East & Jersey Farm ===
Marshalswick East & Jersey Farm (3)
Party	Candidate	Votes	%	±%
Liberal Democrats	Lorraine Kirby	1,488	55.1	
Liberal Democrats	Elissa Dacosta-Waldman	1,420	52.6	
Liberal Democrats	Raj Visram*	1,318	48.8	
Conservative	Lyn Bolton	934	34.6	
Conservative	Frances Leonard*	913	33.8	
Conservative	Beric Read*	869	32.2	
Green	Stephen Clough	285	10.6	
Green	James Lomas	264	9.8	
Labour	Nick Pullinger	236	8.7	
Turnout		2,701	47.77	
Liberal Democrats win (new seat)				
Liberal Democrats win (new seat)				
Liberal Democrats win (new seat)				

=== Marshalswick West ===
Marshalswick West (2)
Party	Candidate	Votes	%	±%
Liberal Democrats	Michael Jones	1,150	60.2	
Liberal Democrats	Simon Mostyn	1,103	57.7	
Conservative	Tom Clegg*	508	26.6	
Conservative	Don Deepthi	482	25.2	
Green	Clare Sayce	206	10.8	
Green	Rachel Timbs	162	8.5	
Labour	Anthony Nicolson	133	7.0	
Turnout		1,910	49.61	
Liberal Democrats win (new seat)				
Liberal Democrats win (new seat)				

=== Park Street ===
Park Street (3)
Party	Candidate	Votes	%	±%
Liberal Democrats	Syed Abidi*	1,303	50.3	
Liberal Democrats	John Parry	1,296	50.0	
Liberal Democrats	Nuala Webb	1,154	44.5	
Conservative	Stella Nash*	954	36.8	
Conservative	Alexandra Clark	950	36.6	
Conservative	Richard Curthoys*	950	36.6	
Green	Alison Park-Crowne	257	9.9	
Labour	Martin McGrath	248	9.6	
Green	Mark Park-Crowne	166	6.4	
Turnout		2,593	41.11	
Liberal Democrats hold		Swing		
Liberal Democrats gain from Conservative		Swing		
Liberal Democrats gain from Conservative		Swing		

=== Redbourn ===
Redbourn (2)
Party	Candidate	Votes	%	±%
Independent	David Mitchell*	886	49.2	
Liberal Democrats	Lucinda Carney	874	48.5	
Conservative	Victoria Mead*	641	35.6	
Conservative	Jane West	341	18.9	
Green	Dee Thomas	213	11.8	
Labour	Symon Vegro	172	9.6	
Labour	Andy Hayes	167	9.3	
Turnout		1,801	41.92	
Independent hold		Swing		
Liberal Democrats gain from Conservative		Swing		

=== Sandridge & Wheathampstead ===
Sandridge & Wheathampstead (3)
Party	Candidate	Votes	%	±%
Liberal Democrats	Lynn Cunningham	1,358	48.5	
Liberal Democrats	Kristian Gavan	1,298	46.4	
Liberal Democrats	Sharon Hollingsworth	1,254	44.8	
Conservative	Gill Clark*	1,240	44.3	
Conservative	Claudio Duran	1,125	40.2	
Conservative	Salih Gaygusuz	984	35.2	
Green	Oliver Hitch	432	15.4	
Labour	Jon Hegerty	274	9.8	
Turnout		2,798	46.03	
Liberal Democrats win (new seat)				
Liberal Democrats win (new seat)				
Liberal Democrats win (new seat)				

=== Sopwell ===
Sopwell (3)
Party	Candidate	Votes	%	±%
Liberal Democrats	Sarwar Shamsher	1,440	61.9	
Liberal Democrats	Emma Matanle*	1,412	60.7	
Liberal Democrats	Muki Gorar	1,237	53.2	
Labour	Janet Smith	550	23.6	
Labour	Jagat Chatrath	442	19.0	
Green	Jack Easton	322	13.8	
Conservative	Heather Rench	317	13.6	
Green	Tricia Gibbons	295	12.7	
Independent	Pia Honey	207	8.9	
Communist	Mark Ewington	75	3.2	
Turnout		2,326	42.79	
Liberal Democrats hold		Swing		
Liberal Democrats hold		Swing		
Liberal Democrats hold		Swing		

=== St Peter's ===
St Peter's (3)
Party	Candidate	Votes	%	±%
Liberal Democrats	Jacqui Taylor*	1,588	65.5	
Liberal Democrats	Danny Clare*	1,531	63.1	
Green	Simon Grover*	1,478	60.9	
Labour	David Byatt	569	23.5	
Conservative	Georgie Callé	403	16.6	
Conservative	Paul Verity	336	13.9	
Turnout		2,425	39.56	
Liberal Democrats hold		Swing		
Liberal Democrats hold		Swing		
Green hold		Swing		

=== St Stephen ===
St Stephen (3)
Party	Candidate	Votes	%	±%
Liberal Democrats	Ajanta Hilton	1,444	49.8	
Liberal Democrats	Giles Fry	1,400	48.3	
Liberal Democrats	Vladimir Jirasek	1,187	40.9	
Conservative	Aaron Jacob*	1,145	39.5	
Conservative	Dave Winstone	1,112	38.4	
Conservative	Joshua Varghese	1,048	36.2	
Labour	Janet Blackwell	285	9.8	
Green	Kate Bennett	263	9.1	
Green	Susana Garcia	202	7.0	
CPA	Adrian Ruffhead	127	4.4	
Turnout		2,899	44.19	
Liberal Democrats gain from Conservative		Swing		
Liberal Democrats gain from Conservative		Swing		
Liberal Democrats gain from Conservative		Swing		

=== Verulam ===
Verulam (3)
Party	Candidate	Votes	%	±%
Liberal Democrats	Dawn Gamble	1,977	67.0	
Liberal Democrats	Edgar Hill*	1,941	65.8	
Liberal Democrats	Andrew Warwick-Thompson	1,705	57.8	
Conservative	Susan Devi	835	28.3	
Green	Veronique Corney	395	13.4	
Green	Jordan Barnes	333	11.3	
Labour	Geoff Meade	262	8.9	
Turnout		2,952	51.12	
Liberal Democrats hold		Swing		
Liberal Democrats hold		Swing		
Liberal Democrats hold		Swing		
