= 2016 St Albans City and District Council election =

English local election

- 5 May 2016

18 of the 58 seats to St Albans City and District Council 30 seats needed for a majority
	First party	Second party	Third party
Party	Conservative	Liberal Democrats	Labour
Seats before	31	16	8
Seats won	0		0
Seats after	31	17	7
Seat change	Steady	▲1	▼1
Popular vote	14,085	9,953	8,313
Percentage	35.9%	25.4%	21.2%
	Fourth party	Fifth party	Sixth party
Party	Independent	Green	UKIP
Seats before	2	1	0
Seats won	0	0	0
Seats after	2	1	0
Seat change	Steady	Steady	Steady
Popular vote	1,727	2,498	2,606
Percentage	4.4%	6.4%	6.6%
	Seventh party
Party	TUSC
Seats before	0
Seats won	0
Seats after	0
Seat change	Steady
Popular vote	23
Percentage	0.1%
Council control before election
Conservative
Council control after election
Conservative

2016 local election results in St Albans

The 2016 St Albans City and District Council election took place on 5 May 2016 to elect members of St Albans City and District Council in England. This was on the same day as other local elections.

== Results summary ==
St Albans City and District Council election, 2016
Party	Seats	Gains	Losses	Net gain/loss	Seats %	Votes %	Votes	+/−
Conservative	31	0	0	Steady		35.9	14,085	-7.7
Liberal Democrats	17	1	0	▲1		25.4	9,953	+2.4
Labour	7	0	1	▼1		21.2	8,313	+2.7
Independent	2	0	0	Steady		4.4	1,727	+1.7
Green	1	0	0	Steady		6.4	2,498	+0.1
UKIP	0	0	0	Steady		6.6	2,606	+0.7
TUSC	0	0	0	Steady		0.1	23	+0.1

== Ward results ==
=== Ashley ===
Ashley
Party	Candidate	Votes	%	±%
Liberal Democrats	Matthew Farrell	939	37.4	+7.8
Labour	Momotaz Rahim	836	33.3	+5.1
Conservative	Robert Anthony Dunster	420	16.7	−10.3
Green	Lydia El-Khouri	181	7.2	−0.9
UKIP	Charles Michael Mason	135	5.4	−1.7
Majority		103	4.1	
Liberal Democrats gain from Labour		Swing		

=== Batchwood ===
Batchwood
Party	Candidate	Votes	%	±%
Labour	Mal Pakenham	1,027	45.7	+12.4
Conservative	Scott Clyne	686	30.5	−3.3
Liberal Democrats	Ellie Hudspith	206	9.2	−7.0
UKIP	Matthew Dovey	177	7.9	−1.4
Green	Lesley Baker	151	6.7	−0.7
Majority		341	15.2	
Labour hold		Swing		

=== Clarence ===
Clarence
Party	Candidate	Votes	%	±%
Liberal Democrats	Chris White	1,178	50.9	+11.6
Conservative	Barry Sumpter	490	21.2	−12.4
Labour	Liz Mills	397	17.2	+0.5
Green	Tim Robinson	226	9.8	0.0
TUSC	Keith Hussey	23	1.0	+0.3
Majority		688	29.7	
Liberal Democrats hold		Swing		

=== Cunningham ===
Cunningham
Party	Candidate	Votes	%	±%
Liberal Democrats	Geoff Harrison	760	39.8	+4.6
Conservative	Nadine Standish	451	26.7	−3.1
Labour	John Paton	408	21.4	+0.2
UKIP	Alan Malin	188	9.8	−0.8
Green	Gregory Riener	102	5.3	−0.9
Majority		309	13.1	
Liberal Democrats hold		Swing		

=== Harpenden East ===
Harpenden East
Party	Candidate	Votes	%	±%
Conservative	Rosemary Farmer	967	46.1	−3.8
Independent	Anne James	415	19.8	N/A
Labour	Rosemary Ross	311	14.8	−0.8
Liberal Democrats	Paul De Kort	260	12.4	−1.7
UKIP	Lester MacKenzie	144	6.9	N/A
Majority		552	26.3	
Conservative hold		Swing		

=== Harpenden North ===
Harpenden North
Party	Candidate	Votes	%	±%
Conservative	Stephen Hodgson	890	47.3	−6.4
Independent	John Hansen	382	20.3	N/A
Labour	Linda Spiri	289	15.4	+2.5
Liberal Democrats	Aileen King	223	11.9	+0.4
UKIP	Stephen Hughes	96	5.1	N/A
Majority		508	27.0	
Conservative hold		Swing		

=== Harpenden South ===
Harpenden South
Party	Candidate	Votes	%	±%
Conservative	David Heritage	1,201	64.9	−1.5
Labour	George Fraser	225	12.2	−2.3
Liberal Democrats	Maria Moyses	219	11.8	−0.3
UKIP	Mick Hawkes	118	6.4	N/A
Green	Suheil Shahryar	88	4.8	N/A
Majority		976	52.7	
Conservative hold		Swing		

=== Harpenden West ===
Harpenden West
Party	Candidate	Votes	%	±%
Conservative	Matthew Stephens	1,232	56.0	−4.9
Liberal Democrats	Jeffrey Phillips	349	15.9	+2.6
Labour	Michael Gray-Higgins	320	14.5	+0.1
Green	Anna Kinnersley	158	7.2	N/A
UKIP	Jennifer Corsbie	141	6.4	N/A
Majority		883	40.1	
Conservative hold		Swing		

=== London Colney ===
London Colney
Party	Candidate	Votes	%	±%
Labour	Dreda Gordon	1,268	52.5	+16.6
Conservative	Patrick Alderman	710	29.4	−9.5
UKIP	John Midgley	238	9.9	−2.2
Liberal Democrats	Jessica Holiday	109	4.5	−4.5
Green	James Lornas	89	3.7	−0.4
Majority		558	23.1	
Labour hold		Swing		

=== Marshalswick North ===
Marshalswick North
Party	Candidate	Votes	%	±%
Liberal Democrats	Janet Churchard	937	43.9	+9.4
Conservative	Claudio Duran	650	30.5	−7.0
Labour	Paul Walker	269	12.6	0.0
Green	Claire Gilbert	140	6.6	−0.1
UKIP	Michael Hollins	138	6.5	−1.3
Majority		287	13.4	
Liberal Democrats hold		Swing		

=== Marshalswick South ===
Marshalswick South
Party	Candidate	Votes	%	±%
Conservative	Richard Curthoys	959	43.3	−1.2
Labour	Richard Harris	520	23.5	+6.7
Liberal Democrats	John Hale	395	17.8	−6.7
Green	Jill Mills	235	10.6	+1.5
UKIP	David Dickson	105	4.7	−0.3
Majority		439	19.8	
Conservative hold		Swing		

=== Park Street ===
Park Street
Party	Candidate	Votes	%	±%
Liberal Democrats	David Yates	952	43.2	+13.8
Conservative	Michael Roth	652	29.6	−7.8
UKIP	Peter Whitehead	287	13.0	−1.5
Labour	Martin McGrath	248	11.3	−3.1
Green	Lesley Baker	185	2.9	−1.6
Majority		300	13.6	
Liberal Democrats hold		Swing		

=== Redbourn ===
Redbourn
Party	Candidate	Votes	%	±%
Independent	Tony Swendell	930	49.6	−9.9
Conservative	Maria Maynard	626	33.4	−24.8
Labour	Anthony Neville	214	11.4	+3.8
UKIP	Daragh Cahalane	106	5.7	+5.5
Majority		304	16.2	
Independent hold		Swing		

=== Sopwell ===
Sopwell
Party	Candidate	Votes	%	±%
Labour	Janet Smith	865	37.3	+2.6
Liberal Democrats	Shakir Rahman	863	37.2	+10.0
Conservative	Heather Rench	309	13.3	−9.4
UKIP	Valerie Hargrave	154	6.6	−1.5
Green	Gail Jackson	127	5.5	−1.8
Majority		2	0.1	
Labour hold		Swing		

=== St Peters ===
St Peters
Party	Candidate	Votes	%	±%
Green	Simon Grover	656	27.8	+11.7
Liberal Democrats	Matt Jones	650	27.5	+0.3
Conservative	Nick Bishop	596	25.2	−10.4
Labour	Alex Veitch	385	16.3	−0.6
UKIP	Michael Douglas	74	3.1	−1.1
Majority		6	0.3	
Green hold		Swing		

=== St Stephen ===
St Stephen
Party	Candidate	Votes	%	±%
Conservative	Brian Gibbard	1,108	55.1	+4.8
Liberal Democrats	Alison Ross	435	21.6	−0.7
UKIP	Tina Lomax	211	10.5	−2.3
Labour	Janet Blackwell	194	9.7	−1.0
Green	Jack Easton	62	3.1	−0.9
Majority		673	33.5	
Conservative hold		Swing		

=== Verulam ===
Verulam
Party	Candidate	Votes	%	±%
Liberal Democrats	Chris Davies	1,186	43.6	+15.2
Conservative	Stella Nash	997	36.6	−11.2
Labour	Michael Bartlet	275	10.1	−2.0
UKIP	Colin Donald	143	5.3	±0.0
Green	Mark Ewington	120	4.4	−1.8
Majority		189	7.0	
Liberal Democrats hold		Swing		

=== Wheathampstead ===
Wheathampstead
Party	Candidate	Votes	%	±%
Conservative	Greg Clark	1,141	58.7	−1.5
Liberal Democrats	Harriet Sherlock	292	15.0	−5.0
Labour	Neill Sankey	262	13.5	+1.3
UKIP	Beverley Rands	151	7.8	N/A
Green	Ian Troughton	99	5.1	−2.5
Majority		849	43.7	
Conservative hold		Swing		

== By-elections between 2016 and 2018 ==
A by-election was held in Clarence on 20 October 2016, after the resignation of Liberal Democrat councillor Sam Rowlands. The seat was held by the new Liberal Democrat candidate, Ellie Hudspith.

Clarence by-election, 20th October 2016
Party	Candidate	Votes	%	±%
Liberal Democrats	Ellie Hudspith	916	57.0	+6.1
Conservative	Michael Roth	388	24.1	+2.9
Labour	Liz Mills	193	12.0	−5.2
Green	Keith Cotton	98	6.1	−3.7
UKIP	David Dickson	16	0.8	N/A
Majority		528	32.9	
Liberal Democrats hold		Swing		
