= History of St Albans =

English municipal history

St Albans is a town located in Hertfordshire, England. It was originally founded as Verlamion, a settlement belonging to the Catuvellauni (a Celtic tribe or state of southeastern Britain before the Roman conquest, attested by inscriptions into the 4th century). It was subsequently transformed into the Roman settlement of Verulamium from where it grew into a municipium around AD 50.

After the Anglo-Saxon settlement it was known as Verlamacaestir. It later became known as St Albans because of its association with Saint Alban.

== Roman ==
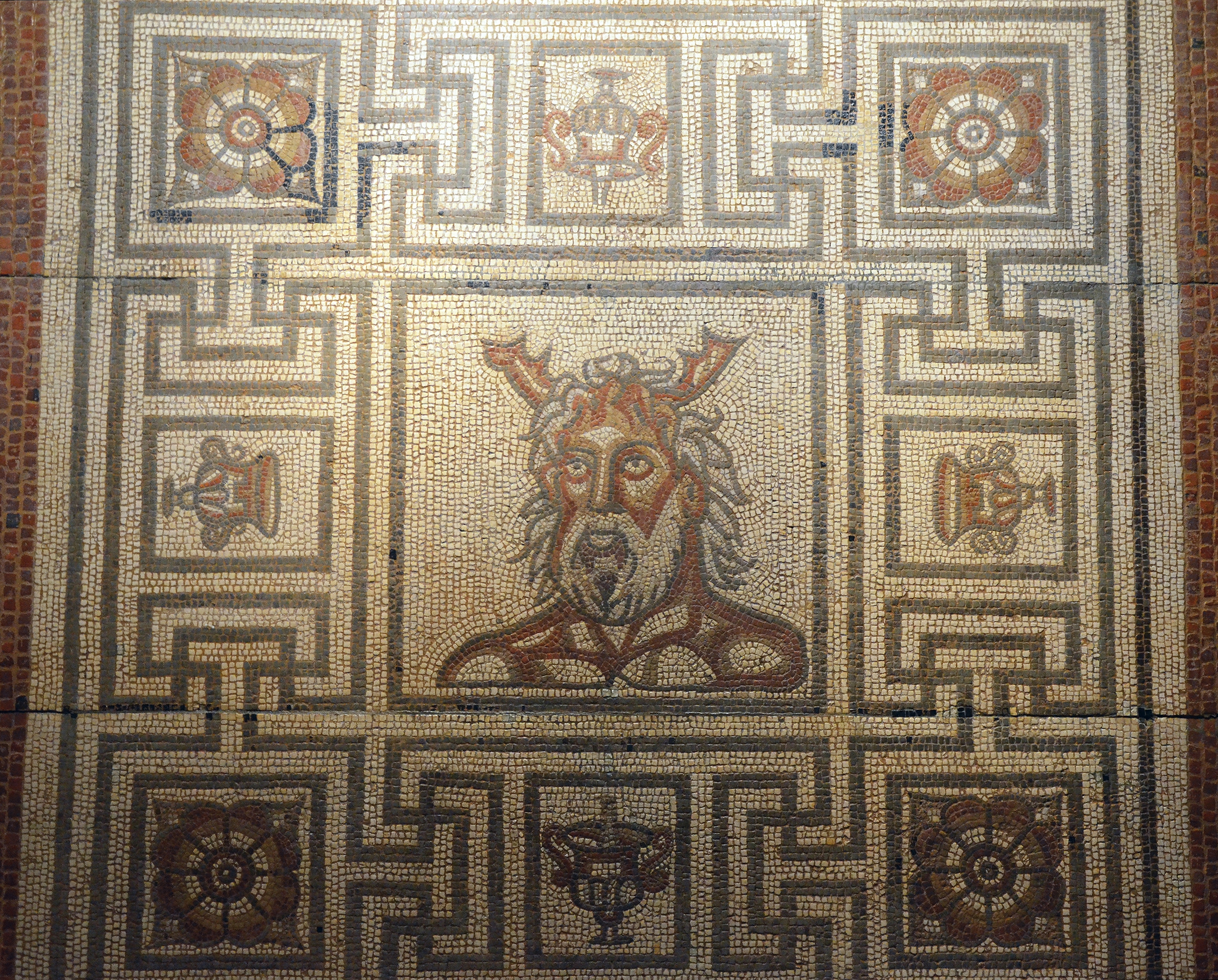
Remains of the Roman city of Verulamium have been excavated in modern times

The Roman city of Verulamium, the third largest town in Roman Britain after Londinium (London) and Camulodunum (Colchester), was built alongside the Celtic settlement in the valley of the River Ver nearer to the present city centre. The settlement was granted the rank of municipium around AD 50, meaning that its citizens had what were known as "Latin Rights", a lesser citizenship status than a colonia possessed. It grew to a significant town, and as such received the attentions of Boudica of the Iceni in 61, when Verulamium was sacked and burnt on her orders: a black ash layer has been recorded by archaeologists, thus confirming the Roman written record. It grew steadily; by the early 3rd century, it covered an area of about 125 acres (0.51 km^{2}), behind a deep ditch and wall. It was encircled by gated walls in AD 275. Verulamium contained a forum, basilica and a theatre, much of which were damaged during two fires, one in 155 and the other in around 250. One of the few extant Roman inscriptions in Britain is found on the remnants of the forum (see Verulamium Forum inscription). The town was rebuilt in stone rather than timber at least twice over the next 150 years.

=== Early Christianity ===
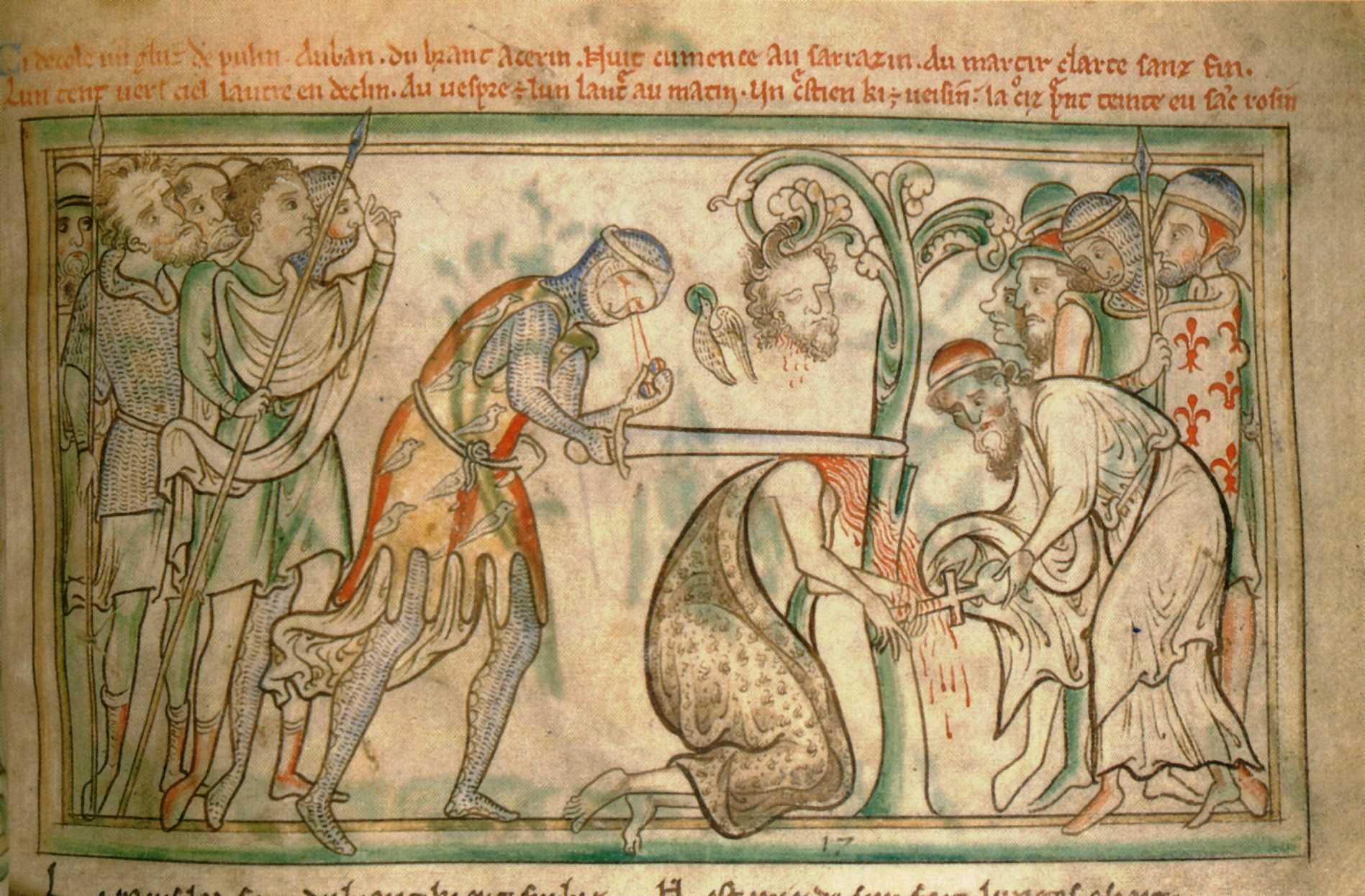
13th-Century manuscript depicting the martyrdom of St Alban (Trinity College Library, Dublin)

The city is named after St Alban, a convert to Christianity who, according to medieval sources, lived in the Roman city. He was martyred in either the third or fourth century. Bede's Ecclesiastical History gives an account of Alban being beheaded on a hill outside the city. This suggests that the cathedral, built on a hill above the Roman city, may have been built on the site of his martyrdom. However, the cathedral could alternatively be on the site of his burial. Widespread cults of saints began in cemeteries outside of Roman cities. The site of Alban's burial remains a topic for investigation. The site of a Roman burial was uncovered near the Cathedral in the late 20th century, in the area of demolished medieval cloisters, probably extending beneath the present building, but there is no evidence of a connection with Alban.

Bede referred to a Roman church dedicated to St Alban, built "when peaceable Christian times were restored" (possibly the fourth century) and still in use in Bede's time. In 429 Germanus of Auxerre visited the church and subsequently promoted the cult of St Alban. John Morris argued that the church was probably built in 396–8. It has been suggested that several unearthed remains might have been Roman churches but there is no certain archaeological evidence. An archaeological excavation in 1978, directed by Martin Biddle, failed to find Roman remains on the site of the chapter house of the medieval abbey, but recent investigation has uncovered a basilica near the cathedral, supporting the contention that it is "the oldest continuous site of Christian worship in Great Britain".

Some historians doubt the historicity of St Alban and argue that his cult was invented by Germanus.

== Later medieval period ==
The Abbots of St Albans diverted Watling Street away from the ruins of Verulamium into the medieval town.

Three main roads date from the medieval period—Holywell Hill, St Peter's Street, and Fishpool Street—each of which had a pilgrim church founded in the ninth century by Abbot Ulsinus at the entrance to the town: St Stephen's, St Peter's and St Michael's respectively. The foundation of the town's markets is also attributed to this time.

== Modern ==
=== Early Modern ===
As part of the dissolution of the monasteries, Henry VIII closed the Abbey in 1539 and took possession of the town, it remained crown property for the next fourteen years. In 1553, Henry's son Edward VI sold the abbey, the governance of the town, and the market (by letters patent) to a group of local merchants and landowners. The town became borough with a mayor. The mayor, assisted by ten burgesses and serving for up to three years, had executive and judicial powers. The first mayor was John Lockey. The Lady Chapel became part of St Albans School and the Great Gatehouse was used as a prison until the 19th century, when the school took it over.

In 1555, during the reign of Queen Mary I, a Protestant baker from Yorkshire, George Tankerfield, was brought from London and burnt to death on Romeland for his refusal to accept the Roman Catholic doctrine of transubstantiation.

During the English Civil War (1642–45) the town sided with parliament but was largely unaffected by the conflict.

=== Eighteenth century ===
The bridge over the River Ver in St Michael's Street, adjacent to Kingsbury Watermill and not far from St Michael's Church, dates from 1765 and is believed to be the oldest extant bridge in Hertfordshire. It is Grade II listed. According to a contemporary account of the Second Battle of St Albans in 1461, another bridge existed on this site previously (recorded in 1505 as Pons de la Maltemyll - Malt Mill Bridge). It is thought that the Romans had built a bridge here by the 3rd century AD. The ford alongside the current bridge, which is known to have existed for 2,000 years, is traditionally believed to be Alban's crossing point on his way to his execution.

=== Nineteenth century ===
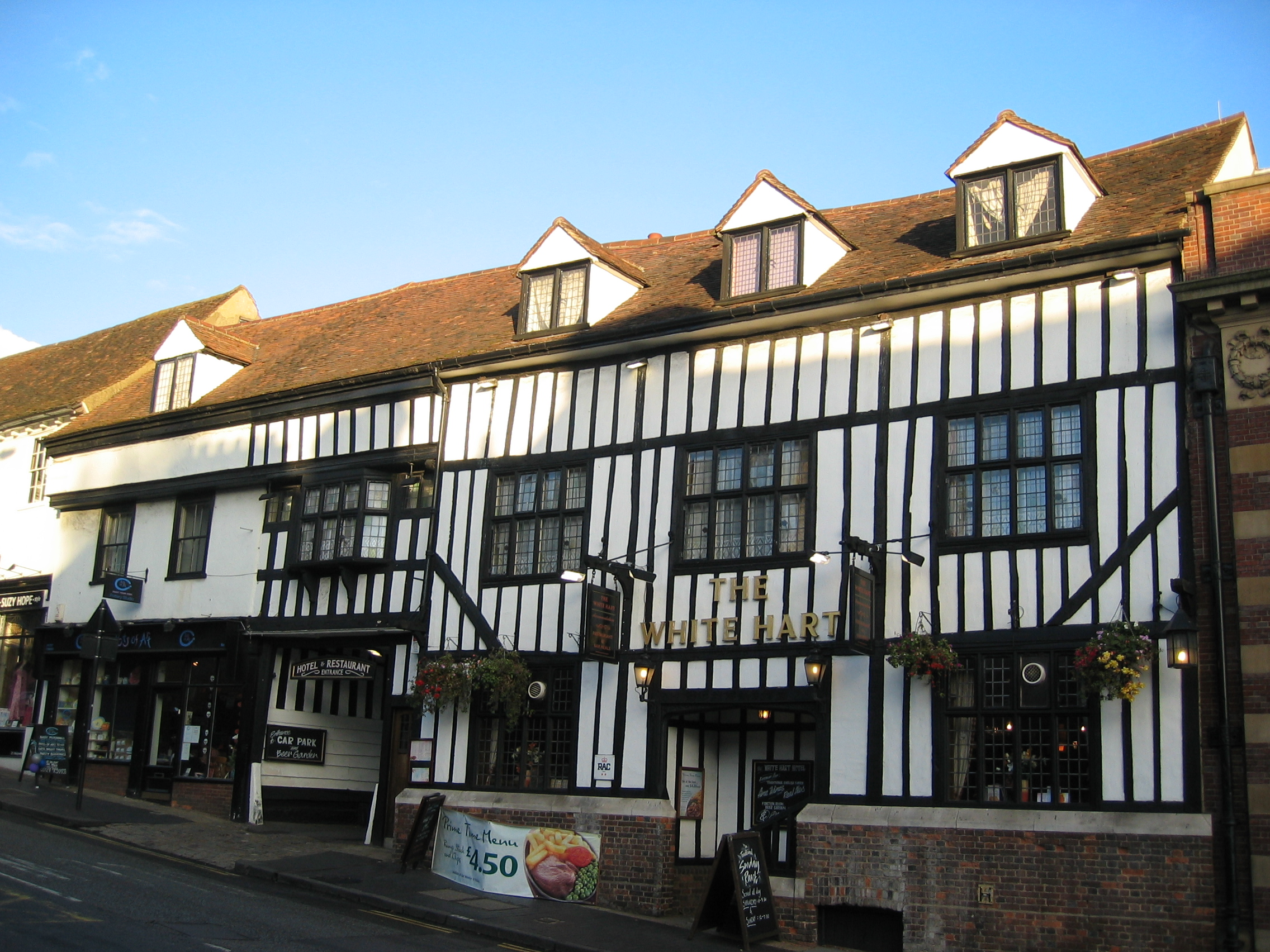
St Albans has many old coaching inns (pictured: The White Hart, Hollywell Hill)

Before the 20th century, St Albans was a rural market town, a Christian pilgrimage site, and the first coaching stop of the route to and from London, accounting for its numerous old inns. Victorian St Albans was small and had little industry. It grew slowly, 8-9% per decade between 1801 and 1861, compared to the 31% per decade growth of London in the same period. The railway arrived relatively late. In 1869 the extension of the city boundaries was opposed by the Earl of Verulam and many of the townsfolk, but there was rapid expansion and much building at the end of the century, and between 1891 and 1901 the population grew by 37%.

Population of St Albans in the Nineteenth Century

1801	3,872
1831	6,582
1851	8,208
1861	9,090
1871	10,421
1881	10,659
1891	12,478
1901	16,181

The medieval road pattern was amended from the 18th century onwards. London Road was constructed in 1754, Hatfield Road in 1824 and Verulam Road in 1833. Verulam Road was created (as part of Thomas Telford's large-scale improvement of sections of the London to Holyhead road) specifically to aid the movement of stage coaches, since St Albans was the first major stop on the coaching route north from London. Victoria Street was called Sweetbriar Lane until 1876.

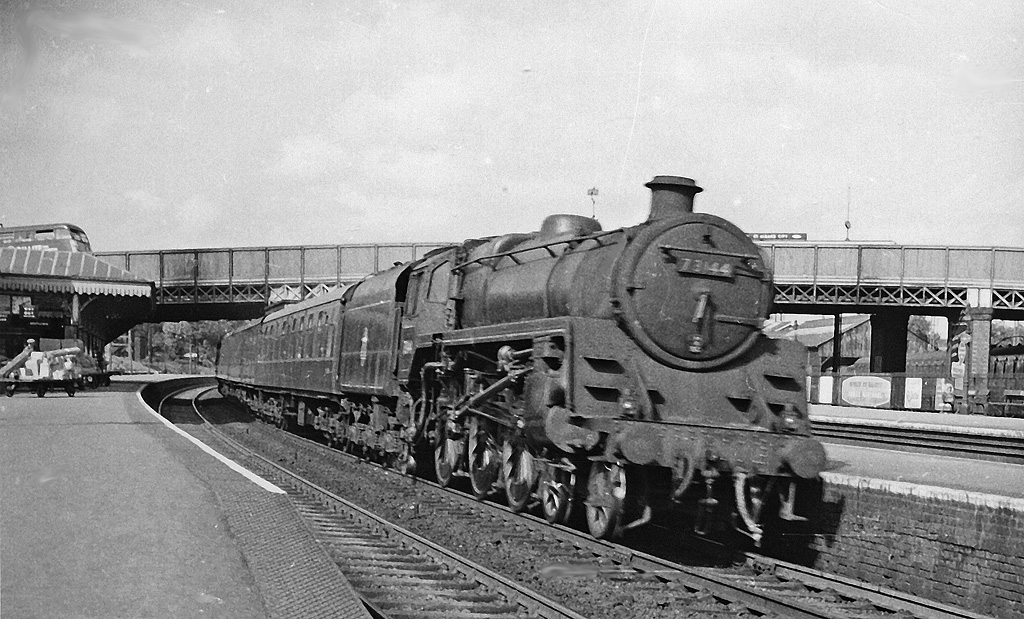
St Albans City station, opened 1868 (pictured in 1958)

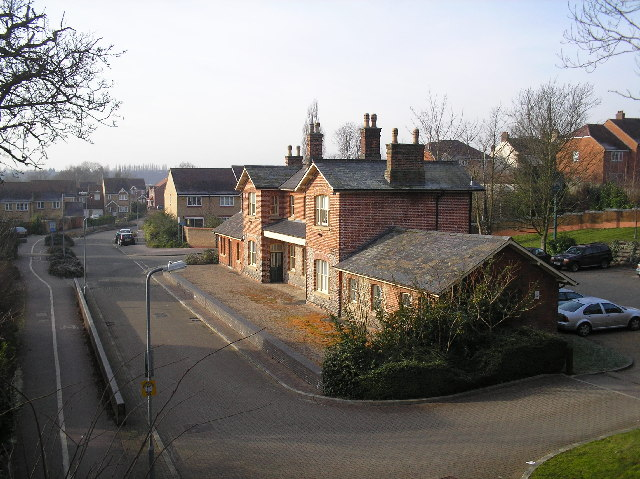
The Old London Road Station, closed 1951

There were three railway stations in the town, two of which are still active: St Albans Abbey and St Albans City. The first, St Albans Abbey, was opened by the London and North Western Railway on 5 May 1858 as the terminus of the Abbey Line, a branch line from Watford Junction. This was followed by the Midland Railway Company's station, now known as St Albans City, which opened on 1 October 1868 on the main line from Bedford to London. There was also a third railway station in the city centre, St Albans (London Road), which was opened on 16 October 1865 by the Great Northern Railway on its Hatfield and St Albans branch. This branch line closed to passengers in 1951.

In 1877, in response to a public petition, Queen Victoria issued the second royal charter, which granted city status to the borough and Cathedral status to the former Abbey Church. The new diocese was established in the main from parts of the large Diocese of Rochester. The Abbey Church of St Alban had fallen into disrepair, despite work done on it under Sir George Gilbert Scott in 1860–1877, and some thought it ought to be allowed to decline into romantic ruin, but in the latter year, under the chairmanship of the Earl of Verulam, a restoration committee was formed, of which Edmund Beckett (later Lord Grimthorpe) became the dominant member. Grimthorpe put up £130,000 of his own money and by sheer force of personality brought about a restoration of the church (1880–1883) in Neo-Gothic style, sparking the ire of the Society for the Protection of Ancient Buildings. Nicholas Pevsner said that the Abbey "is the only one of the major churches of England that has a West Front completely, or almost completely, Victorian." However, it seems reasonable to assume that, without Grimthorpe's money the Abbey Church would now be a ruin like many other former monastic churches.

The original St Albans Football Club was founded in October 1881, if folded in 1904. The present day St Albans City Football Club was founded on 13 April 1908. The club's home ground is Clarence Park, which was donated to the city by Sir John Blundell and opened on 23 July 1894.

The aforementioned transport links attracted a seed merchant, Samuel Ryder, to locate his business in St Albans, which eventually moved to offices and a large purpose-built packing seed hall on Holywell Hill, which is now a Café Rouge restaurant. He served as Mayor of St Albans in 1905, and remained a councillor for several years after his term of office. In later life, Ryder began to suffer from poor health and was advised to take up golf as exercise. He joined the local Verulam Golf Club, making large donations to the club including the famous Ryder Cup and sponsorship of the tournament.

Ralph Chubb, the poet and printer, lived on College Street in St Albans from 1892 to 1913, and attended St Albans School. His work frequently references the Abbey of St Albans, and he ascribed mystical significance to the geography and history of the town.

Another St Albans writer, Charles Williams, lived as boy and young man in Victoria Street from 1894 to 1917. He also attended St Albans School.

=== Twentieth century ===
Arthur Melbourne-Cooper's A Dream of Toyland, produced in St Albans in 1907

The pioneering filmmaker Arthur Melbourne-Cooper was born in St Albans in 1874 at 99 London Road. He became a noted figure in the history of film when he began to explore the new art of moving photography in the mid-1900s. By 1908, he had set up a production base, the Alpha Production Works in Bedford Park Road, later moving to larger premises at Alma Road. Among the pioneering films he shot in St Albans was the animated fantasy, Dreams of Toyland (1908). He also established a film theatre on London Road to present his productions to the paying public, the Alpha Picture House, which opened on 27 July 1908, Hertfordshire's first permanent cinema. The cinema changed hands several times, variously known as the Poly, the Regent, the Capitol and the Odeon. It was replaced by a new Art Deco building in 1931, and the cinema continued in operation until 1995. In 2014 the building was restored and re-opened as the Odyssey Cinema.

During World War I in September 1916, following an attack on St Albans, the German Airship SL 11 became the first airship to be brought down over England.

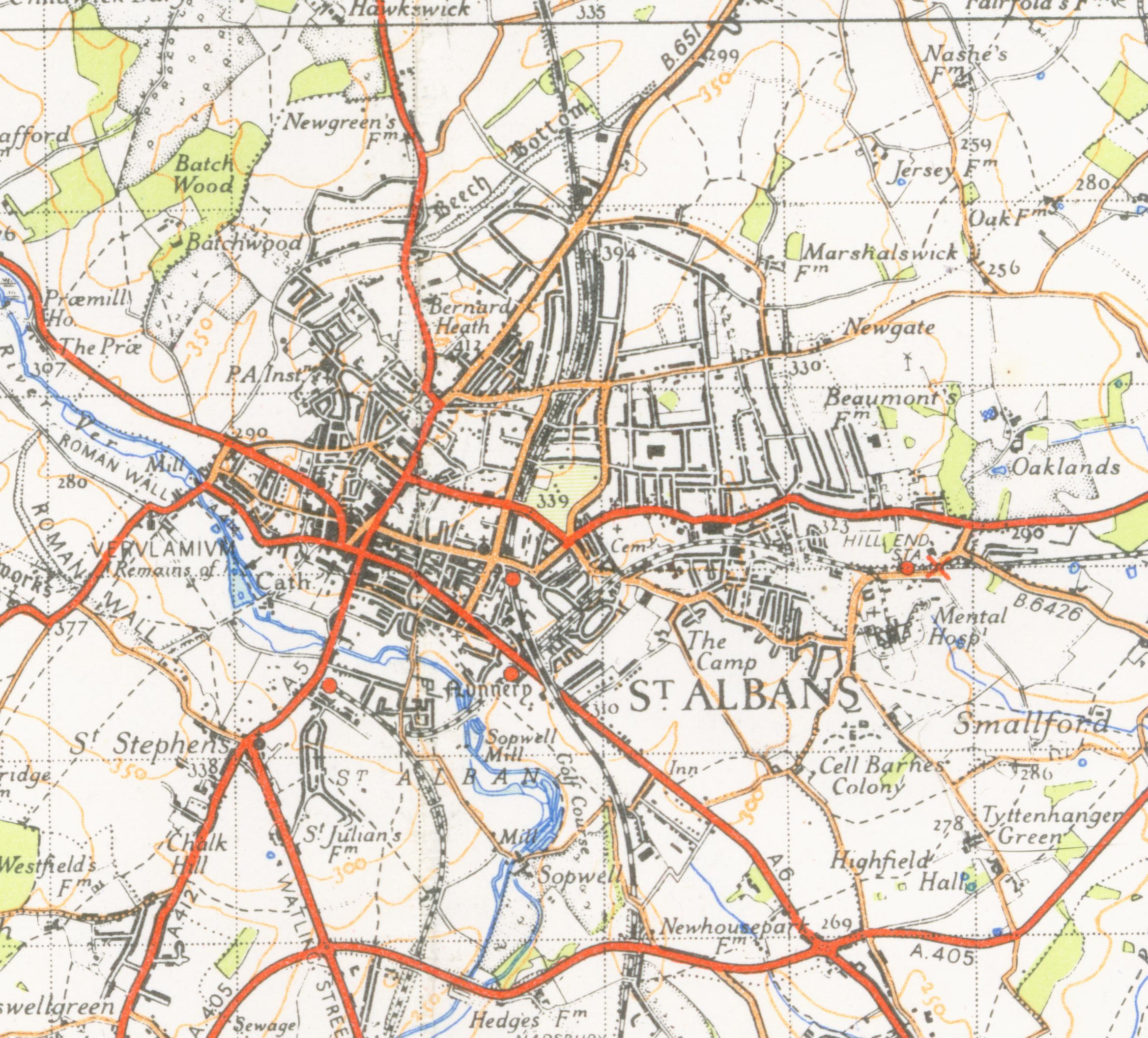
St Albans on the 1 inch to the mile map Ordnance Survey map of 1944

In the inter-war years St Albans, in common with much of the surrounding area, became a centre for emerging high-technology industries, most notably aerospace. Nearby Radlett was the base for Handley Page Aircraft Company, while Hatfield became home to de Havilland. St Albans itself became a centre for the Marconi plc company, specifically, Marconi Instruments.Marconi (later part of the General Electric Company) remained the city's largest employer (with two main plants) until the 1990s. A third plant - working on top secret defence work - also existed. All of these industries are now gone from the area.

The city expanded rapidly after World War II, as government policy promoted the creation of New Towns and the expansion of existing towns around London. The local authority built large housing estates at Cottonmill (to the south), Mile House (to the south-east) and New Greens (to the north). The Marshalswick area to the north-east was also expanded, completing a programme of mainly private house building begun before the war.

In 1974 St Albans City Council, St Albans Rural District Council and Harpenden Town Council were merged, as part of a major national re-organisation of local government in the UK, to form St Albans District Council.

=== Twenty-first century ===
In 2011 the population of the St Albans City and District was 140,664, up 9% on the 2001 population of 129,005. By 2021 the population had risen a further 5.4% to 148,700.

== See also ==
- Verulam House, St Albans (17th century)
- Verulam House, St Albans

== Bibliography ==
- Dunn, Alastair (2002). The Great Rising of 1381: the Peasants' Revolt and England's Failed Revolution. Stroud, UK: Tempus. ISBN 978-0-7524-2323-4.
