= Verulamium Park =

Park in St Albans, Hertfordshire, England

Coordinates: 51°44′55″N 0°21′05″W

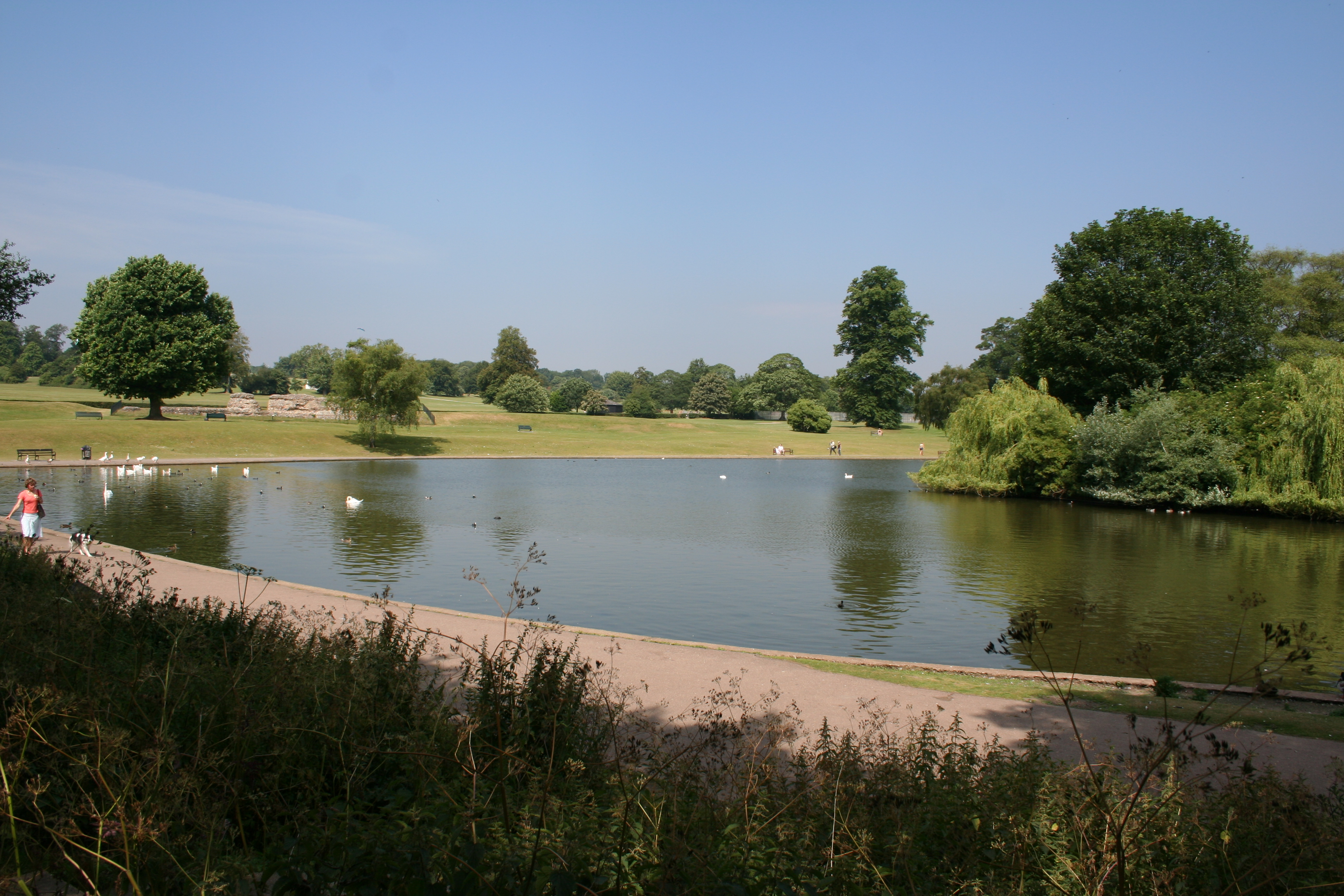
Verulamium Park in summer

Verulamium Park is a park in St Albans, Hertfordshire. Set in over 100 acres (0.40 km^{2}) of parkland, Verulamium Park was purchased from the Earl of Verulam in 1929 by the then City Corporation. Today the park is owned and operated by St Albans City and District Council.

The park is named after the Roman city of Verulamium on which it stands. The city walls and outline of the main London Gate can still be seen. Archaeological excavations were undertaken in the park during the 1930s by Sir Mortimer Wheeler and his wife Tessa, during which the 1800-year-old hypocaust and its covering mosaic floor were discovered. The Hypocaust Mosaic is on view to the public, protected from the elements by a purpose-built building in the park. On the outskirts of the park is Verulamium Museum, which contains hundreds of archaeological objects relating to everyday Roman life in what was a major Roman city. A pub, Ye Olde Fighting Cocks, is also located on the edge of the park. This pub was previously listed in the Guinness Book of Records as the oldest pub in England, claiming to have been in continuous business since 739 AD. However, this award was retracted in 2000 due to a lack of evidence.

There is a well attended children's play area, a small crazy golf course, outdoor trampolines and a seasonal splash park (situated near the main car park), which is free to use and runs between May and September. Additional facilities include an outdoor basketball court, beach volleyball courts, outdoor gym equipment and a cafe "Inn On The Park".

A main feature of the park is the ornamental lake. Construction started on this project during 1929, giving much needed work to the unemployed of St Albans during the depression. The lake is fed by the River Ver. The lake is home to a wealth of waterbirds, including mallards, swans, Canada geese, herons, great crested grebes, coots, pochards and tufted ducks.

In the southeastern part of the park, the Westminster Lodge Leisure Centre provides a number of sports facilities, including a pool, gym, tennis courts, fitness classes and running track. The running track and other areas of the park are used by local running and athletics clubs. Several football pitches and a cricket pitch are maintained and used by local amateur leagues. The park also hosts St Albans parkrun, a free weekly timed 5k event every Saturday morning at 9 am.

In recent years the park has hosted several commercial events including music, food and comedy festivals. It is also the location of an annual fireworks display each November. In 2022 it was used as a filming location for the 2023 film Wonka.

The northeastern edge of the park abuts St Albans Cathedral and St Albans School, the northwestern edge abuts St Michael's Church, and the southeastern edge abuts St Columba's College. St Albans Abbey railway station is situated just to the east of the park. The excavated Roman theatre is just to the west of the park.

Paid parking is available at the northwestern edge of the park, adjacent to St Michael's Church and Verulamium Museum, and on the southeastern side adjacent to Westminster Lodge Leisure Centre.
