= William Page (historian) =

British historian and editor (1861–1934)

William Henry Page
- Born: 4 September 1861; Paddington, United Kingdom
- Died: 3 February 1934 (aged 72); Middleton-on-Sea
- Education: Dr Westmacott's School, Westminster School
- Occupations: Historian, editor
- Known for: English local history
- Spouse: Kate Marion Rowe

William Henry Page (4 September 1861 – 3 February 1934) was a prolific and pioneering British historian and editor. For the last three decades of his life he was general editor of the Victoria County History.

== Life ==
William Page was born at his family's house at Norfolk Square, Paddington, London on 4 September 1861, the fifth of six children of merchant Henry Page and Georgina (née Forrester). He was privately schooled locally at Dr Westmacott's School and then entered Westminster School, where his education was cut short by the death of his father in 1875. The family moved to "a genteel part" of Lewisham, and Page was articled to a civil engineer. Page had two older brothers, one of whom moved to Australia; having completed his articles, in about 1881 Page followed him to take up an engineering post with the Government of Queensland. Page returned to London in 1884.

Page's eldest sister married the record agent and antiquarian William John Hardy, who employed Page from 1885. The business later became the partnership of Page and Hardy, with an office in Lincoln's Inn.

In 1886 Page married Kate Marion Rowe. They settled in Forest Hill and had a daughter (Dorothy) and a son (Ivan).

As a record agent Page frequented the Public Record Office at its then premises in Chancery Lane, where W. J. Hardy's uncle Thomas Duffus Hardy had been deputy keeper since 1861, succeeded by Hardy's father William Hardy. Page developed an interest in historical records, was elected to the Society of Antiquaries in 1887 and published his first article the next year.

== Early historical works: Northumberland and Hertfordshire ==
Page initially concentrated his historical interest on Northumberland. His first article, published in 1888, was about the Northumbrian palatinates and regalities. He followed this with editions of three early assize rolls of Northumberland (1891), the cartulary of Brinkburn Priory (1893), a table of the pontifical years of the bishops of Durham (1896), and an edition of the Edwardine inventories of church goods for County Durham, Northumberland and Yorkshire (1897).

Page started to work on aspects of the history of Hertfordshire, where his brother-in-law and sister lived. In 1896 he moved to St Albans, where in 1897 he became assistant secretary of the St Albans Architectural and Archaeological Society. In the same year he helped the archaeological excavation of the churchyard of St Michael's parish church and in 1898–1902 helped the Rev. C.V. Bicknell to excavate the forum of Verulamium. Also in 1898 Page helped to found the Hertfordshire County Museum. Page remained a member of the St Albans Architectural and Archaeological Society after he later moved away from Hertfordshire.

== Victoria County History ==
In 1899 Laurence Gomme and H. Arthur Doubleday launched the Victoria County History through Archibald Constable & Co, in which Doubleday was a partner. Doubleday formed the County History Syndicate, Ltd. to run the project. A friend of Page, J. Horace Round, recommended Page to Doubleday as a suitable local editor for the VCH's Hertfordshire volumes. Round recommended that a model parish history be drafted and circulated to the VCH's other editors. Page prepared the history of Wheathampstead in Hertfordshire, which was completed and circulated to VCH editors before the end of 1900. A History of the County of Hertford, Volume 1 was published in 1902 with Page named as co-editor.

In 1902 Page gave up his partnership with W. J. Hardy and became joint general editor of the VCH. Page helped Doubleday to set the VCH's founding principles: a co-operative project in which nationally reputable historians would contribute according to their various specialisms, using the new disciplines of archaeology and economic history as well as palaeography and the systematic study of surviving ancient buildings, and covering all counties of England in a systematic and uniform style. Page and Doubleday wrote and circulated a full and detailed Guide for VCH writers, apparently in 1903.

In 1904 Doubleday left Constable & Co. and Page took over as general editor of the VCH. The VCH moved into offices adjoining Constable's in James Street (later Orange Street) off Haymarket and Page moved from St Albans to a mansion block overlooking Battersea Park. In 1906 Page moved again to Frognal in Hampstead.

=== Frederick Smith's sponsorship ===
The VCH published a number of volumes in its early years but progress with documenting the topography of parishes was slow. In 1907 the VCH's main financial supporter withdrew in dissatisfaction and Page was obliged to lay off staff. By 1909 the VCH had negotiated support from the soldier, businessman and politician Frederick Smith of the W H Smith family, and Page was able to rehire the staff.

Page expanded the VCH staff so that by 1915 it included four sub-editors, four architectural historians and more than 40 research and clerical workers. Most of the latter were young women who had recently completed degree courses at Oxford, Cambridge, London or the Scottish universities. Oxford and Cambridge did not allow women to graduate until 1920 and 1921 respectively, although they allowed them to sit examinations and receive their full results. Under Page, the VCH became one of the relatively few employers to offer women graduate-level employment. However, the VCH's work on architectural history remained the preserve of a team of young men.

Page joined the Royal Commission on the Historical Monuments of England as an assistant commissioner in 1909 and became a commissioner in 1921. For the Commission he wrote historical summaries for the county inventories for Hertfordshire (published in 1911), Buckinghamshire (published in two volumes in 1912 and 1913) and Essex (published in four volumes between 1916 and 1913).

The First World War induced a greater crisis for he VCH. Sales rapidly declined, staff left to join the armed services or take other war work and Page was obliged to suspend the project until the end of the War. Page instead spent the war editing a four-volume history of the kings and queens of England that was published from 1917 to 1922, and a two-volume economic history published in 1919.

Post-war economic conditions did not support resumption of the VCH project on its pre-war scale so The County History Syndicate was dissolved in 1920 and Page continued work unsalaried. In 1922 he secured the resumption of support from Frederick Smith, who was by now the 2nd Viscount Hambleden. Page moved home again, this time to the new development of Middleton-on-Sea in West Sussex. He took with him 14 tons of VCH materials and had a wooden building large enough to house them all erected in his garden. He continued work on editor's expenses only and still without a salary.

=== Institute of Historical Research's involvement ===
In 1921 the historian Albert Pollard founded the University of London's Institute of Historical Research and in 1922 it provided the VCH with an office in its temporary accommodation in Malet Street, London. However Page made little use of it and continued to work mostly from his garden headquarters in Middleton-on-Sea.

In 1931 Page's daughter Dorothy married Sir Richard Gregory, the editor of Nature. In 1932 the University of Oxford awarded Page an honorary D. Litt.

In 1931 the Viscount Hambleden withdrew his family's support for the VCH. Page bought the rights to the name early in 1932 and transferred both ownership and management of the project to the IHR in 1933. The IHR created a VCH Committee, which elected Page as its first chairman and appointed him to continue as editor. However, in February 1934 Page died at home in Middleton at the age of 72.

Page was succeeded by the economic historian L.F. Salzman, who had been on the VCH staff since 1904. The VCH's A History of the County of Berkshire, Volume 2, published in 1935, included an obituary and portrait photograph of Page.

=== Achievements at the VCH ===
Under Page's editorship the VCH published 89 volumes including 10 complete county sets. A number of further volumes were in preparation at the time of his death, and under Page the VCH was further advanced at completing general articles on topography. This helps to explain how Page's name appears as an editor of a number of volumes published after his death, including History of the County of Rutland, Volume 2 (1935), A History of the County of Huntingdon, Volume 2 (1936), A History of the County of Oxford, Volume 1 (1939), A History of the County of Warwick, Volume 2 (1947), A History of the County of Hertford, Volume 4 (1971), A History of the County of Sussex, Volume 2 (1973), A History of the County of York, Volume 3 (1974) and A History of the County of Suffolk, Volume 2 (1975).

== Works ==
- "Some remarks on the churches of the Domesday Survey". Archaeologia. 1915.
- "The origins and forms of Hertfordshire towns and villages". Archaeologia. 1920.
- Page, William (1968) [1919]. Commerce and Industry; A Historical Review of the Economic Conditions of the British Empire from the Peace of Paris in 1815 to the Declaration of War in 1914, Based on Parliamentary Debates (2 volumes).
- Page, William (1929) [1923]. London, its Origin and Early development. London: Archibald Constable & Co.

=== Victoria County History ===
- Page, William, ed. (1908). A History of the County of Bedford, Volume 2. Victoria County History.
- Page, William, ed. (1912). A History of the County of Bedford, Volume 3. Victoria County History.
- Page, William; Ditchfield, P.H., eds. (1907). A History of the County of Berkshire, Volume 2. Victoria County History. London: Archibald Constable & Co.
- Page, William; Ditchfield, P.H., eds. (1923). A History of the County of Berkshire, Volume 3. Victoria County History.
- Page, William; Ditchfield, P.H., eds. (1924). A History of the County of Berkshire, Volume 4. Victoria County History.
- Page, William, ed. (1905). A History of the County of Buckingham, Volume 1. Victoria County History. London: Archibald Constable & Co.
- Page, William, ed. (1908). A History of the County of Buckingham, Volume 2. Victoria County History. London: Archibald Constable & Co.
- Page, William, ed. (1925). A History of the County of Buckingham, Volume 3. Victoria County History.
- Page, William, ed. (1927). A History of the County of Buckingham, Volume 4. Victoria County History.
- Page, William, ed. (1907). A History of the County of Derby, Volume 2. Victoria County History.
- Page, William, ed. (1908). A History of the County of Dorset, Volume 2. Victoria County History.
- Page, William, ed. (1907). A History of the County of Durham, Volume 2. Victoria County History.
- Page, William, ed. (1928). A History of the County of Durham, Volume 3. Victoria County History.
- Page, William; Round, J.H., eds. (1907). A History of the County of Essex, Volume 2. Victoria County History.
- Page, William, ed. (1907). A History of the County of Gloucester, Volume 2. Victoria County History. London: Archibald Constable & Co.
- Doubleday, H. Arthur; Page, William, eds. (1973). A History of the County of Hampshire, Volume 2. Victoria County History.
- Page, William, ed. (1908). A History of the County of Hampshire, Volume 3. Victoria County History.
- Page, William, ed. (1911). A History of the County of Hampshire, Volume 4. Victoria County History.
- Page, William, ed. (1912). A History of the County of Hampshire, Volume 5. Victoria County History.
- Doubleday, H. Arthur; Page, William, eds. (1902). A History of the County of Hertford, Volume 1. Victoria County History.
- Page, William, ed. (1908). A History of the County of Hertford, Volume 2. Victoria County History.
- Page, William, ed. (1912). A History of the County of Hertford, Volume 3. Victoria County History.
- Page, William, ed. (1971). A History of the County of Hertford, Volume 4. Victoria County History.
- Page, William; Proby, Granville; Norris, H.E. (1926). A History of the County of Huntingdon, Volume 1. Victoria County History.
- Page, William; Proby, Granville; Ladds, S. Inskip (1932). A History of the County of Huntingdon, Volume 2. Victoria County History.
- Page, William; Proby, Granville; Ladds, S. Inskip (1936). A History of the County of Huntingdon, Volume 3. Victoria County History.
- Page, William, ed. (1926). A History of the County of Huntingdon, Volume 2. Victoria County History.
- Page, William, ed. (1906). A History of the County of Lincoln, Volume 2. Victoria County History.
- Page, William, ed. (1909). A History of the County of London, Volume 2. Victoria County History.
- Page, William, ed. (1911). A History of the County of Middlesex, Volume 2. Victoria County History.
- Page, William, ed. (1906). A History of the County of Norfolk, Volume 2. Victoria County History.
- Page, William, ed. (1910). A History of the County of Nottingham, Volume 2. Victoria County History.
- Page, William, ed. (1930). A History of the County of Northampton, Volume 3. Victoria County History.
- Salzman, Louis F.; Page, William; Salter, Herbert E.; Lobel, Mary D; Crossley, Alan (1939). A History of the County of Oxford: Volume 1. Victoria County History. London: Archibald Constable & Co.
- Page, William, ed. (1907). A History of the County of Oxford, Volume 2. Victoria County History. Archibald Constable & Co.
- Page, William, ed. (1908). A History of the County of Rutland, Volume 1. Victoria County History.
- Page, William, ed. (1935). A History of the County of Rutland, Volume 2. Victoria County History.
- Page, William, ed. (1906). A History of the County of Somerset, Volume 1. Victoria County History.
- Page, William, ed. (1911). A History of the County of Somerset, Volume 2. Victoria County History.
- Page, William, ed. (1975). A History of the County of Suffolk, Volume 2. Victoria County History. ISBN 9780712906470.
- Page, William, ed. (1973). A History of the County of Sussex, Volume 2. Victoria County History.
- Page, William, ed. (1947). A History of the County of Warwick, Volume 2. Victoria County History.
- Willis-Bund, J.W.; Page, William, eds. (1971). A History of the County of Worcestershire, Volume 2. Victoria County History.
- Page, William; Willis-Bund, J.W., eds. (1924). A History of the County of Worcestershire, Volume 4. Victoria County History.
- Page, William, ed. (1974). A History of the County of York, Volume 3. Victoria County History.
- Page, William, ed. (1914). A History of the County of York North Riding, Volume 1. Victoria County History.
- Page, William, ed. (1923). A History of the County of York North Riding, Volume 3. Victoria County History.
