= Roman Theatre, St Albans =

Ancient Roman theater in St. Albans, Hertfordshire, England

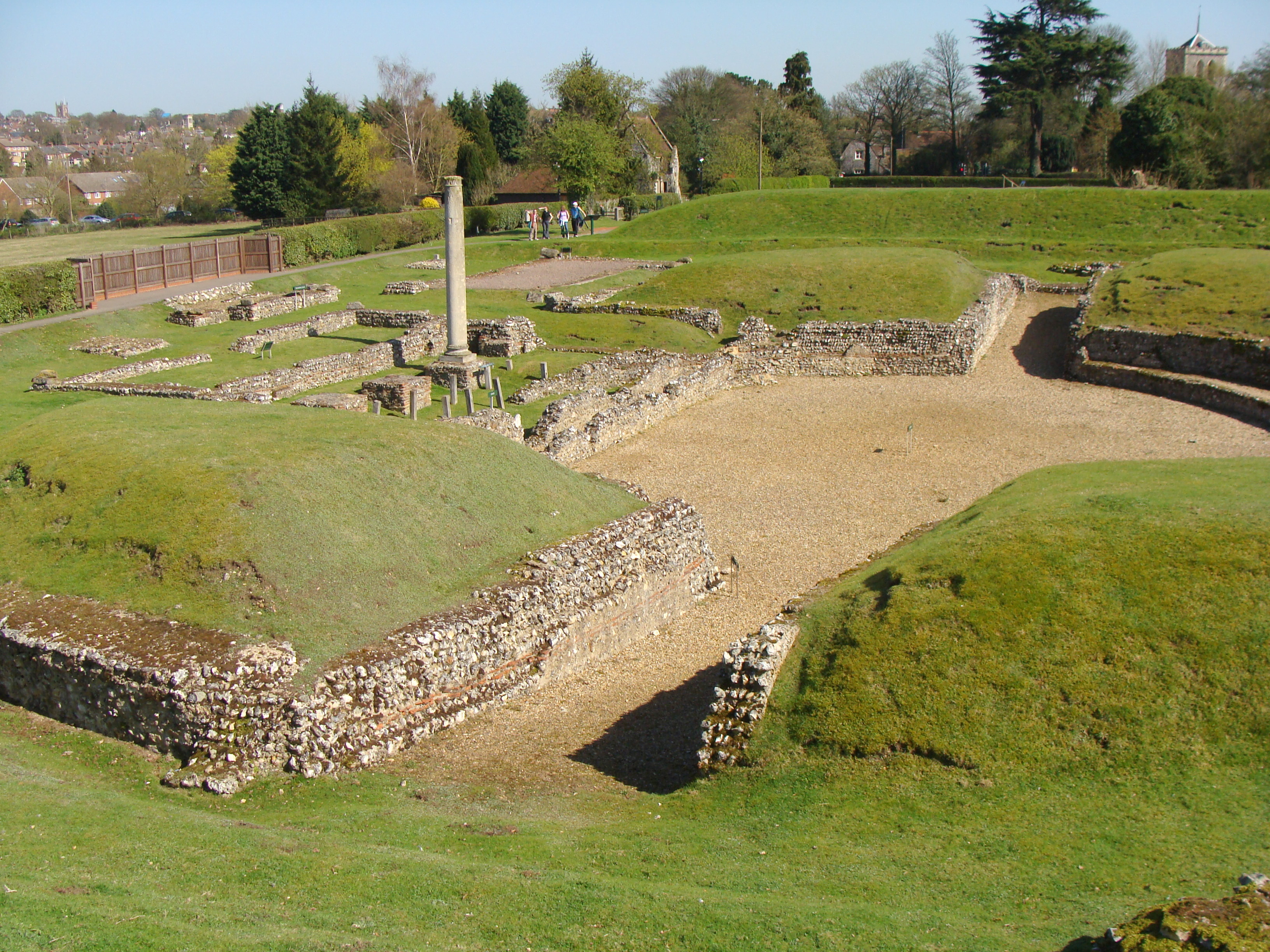
Looking across the Roman theatre towards St Michael's Church, St Albans

The Roman Theatre at St Albans, Hertfordshire, England is an excavated site within the Roman walled city of Verulamium. Although there are other Roman theatres in Britain (for example at Camulodunum), the one at Verulamium is claimed to be the only example of its kind, being a theatre with a stage rather than an amphitheatre.

The theatre differs from the typical Roman theatre in being built on a site that is only slightly sloping (where possible Roman theatres took advantage of the natural terrain), and in its plan (although there are theatres with similar plans in Northern Gaul). The theatre was built in about 140AD. Urban life continued in Verulamium into the 5th century. However, by that time the theatre had fallen into disuse. It was used as a rubbish dump in the 4th century.

== Excavation ==
It was excavated in the 19th century, and again in the 1930s by Kathleen Kenyon.

== Access and use ==
The theatre is on land belonging to the Earl of Verulam and is regularly opened to the public.

The excavated theatre was occasionally used for theatrical performances, and these have now become regular with a Roman Theatre Open Air Festival.

== See also ==
- List of Roman theatres
- St Albans Museums
