= Hypocaust Museum =

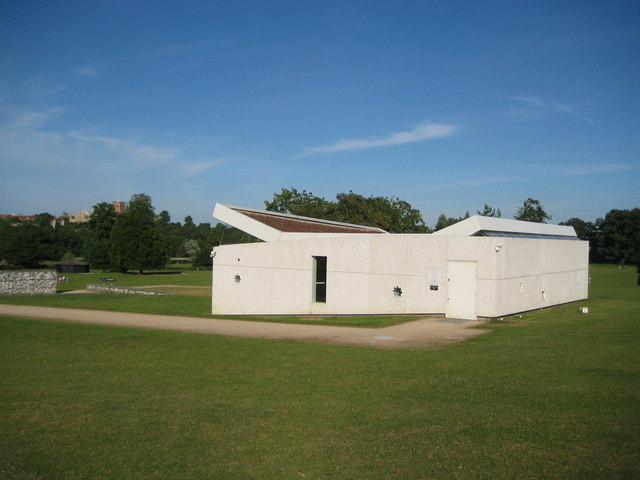

The Hypocaust Museum is a museum at St Albans, Hertfordshire, England. Situated in Verlamium Park, the museum provides in situ conservation and interpretation of a hypocaust within the walled city of Verulamium.

The system heated residential accommodation built around 200 CE. Unlike the hypocaust at Welwyn, it appears not to be linked to baths.

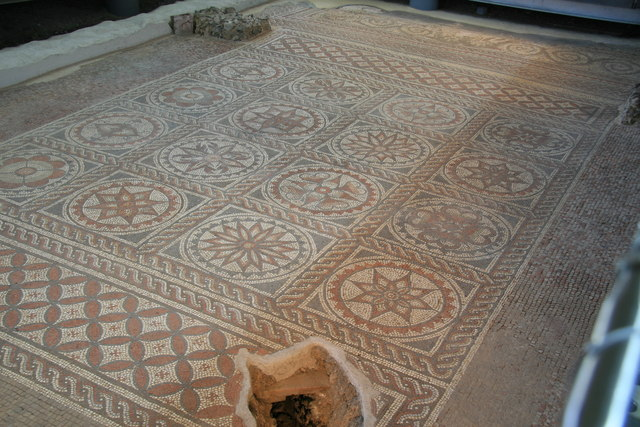
Mosaic floor with hypocaust below

The hypocaust was excavated in the 1930s as part of large-scale excavations conducted by Sir Mortimer Wheeler and Tessa Wheeler on land recently acquired by the Corporation of St Albans. The original museum building was replaced in 2004.

== See also ==
- Verulamium Museum
