= Pope Ladies =

Pope ladies are yeast-based buns unique to the city of St. Albans, Hertfordshire, England. They are thought to date from the Middle Ages.

Pope ladies are shaped to look like figures consisting of a body, head, two arms but no legs. The base of the body would be tapered to a point.

An example of the bun can be found in Museum of St Albans.

Traditionally they were said to have been made and handed out to the poor on Lady Day or New Year's Day (although there is some debate over this). Nowadays they are available from most local baker shops.

Recipes are available on the internet, many of which seem to be from American sites. Traditionally nutmeg should be added, but some recent recipes don't include this.
