= Blue Anchor (disambiguation) =

Blue Anchor may refer to:

== Places ==
- Blue Anchor, Cornwall, England
- Blue Anchor, West Somerset, England
  - Blue Anchor railway station
- Blue Anchor, New Jersey, United States
- Blue Anchor, Swansea, Wales

== Other uses ==
- Blue Anchor Building (California, USA)
- The Blue Anchor Inn, pub in Aberthaw, Wales
- Blue Anchor, Hammersmith, pub in London
- The Blue Anchor, St Albans, former pub in St Albans

== See also ==
- Blue Anchor to Lilstock Coast SSSI (England)
- Anchor Blue Clothing Company
