= Thomas Meautys =

English civil servant and politician

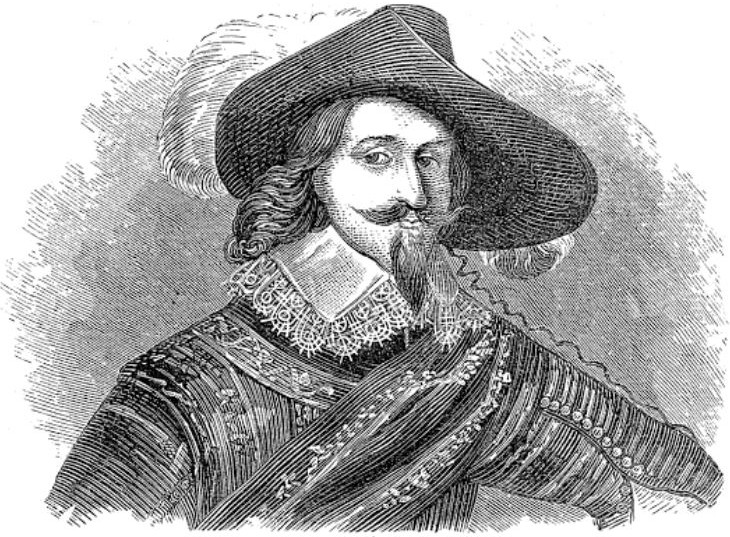
Sir Thomas Meautys

Sir Thomas Meautys (1592–1649) was an English civil servant and politician who sat in the House of Commons between 1621 and 1640.

== Biography ==
Meautys was the son of Thomas Meautys of West Ham and of St Julian's Hospital, Hertfordshire, and his wife Elizabeth, daughter of Sir Henry Coningsby of North Mimms. His elder brother, Henry, was also a Member of Parliament. He became the private secretary to Francis Bacon. In 1619, he was made clerk to His Majesty's Council. He is credited, with William Rawley, as being one of two key clients of Bacon who remained loyal to the former Lord Chancellor in his disgrace. Meautys eventually paid for a funerary monument to Bacon at his gravesite in St. Albans.

After Bacon's fall, Meautys became a protégé of Lord Keeper Coventry, High Steward of Cambridge from 1626 to 1640. In 1621, Meautys was made a freeman and elected an alderman of Cambridge. On the same day, he was elected Member of Parliament for Cambridge. He was a clerk of the Privy Council from 1623. He was re-elected MP for Cambridge in 1625, 1626, and 1628 and continued to sit for the town until King Charles I began to rule without parliament in 1629.

On Bacon's death in 1626 Meautys inherited Old Gorhambury House outside St Albans, with the will vesting Verulam House in trustees for Meautys' use. He became clerk of the Writs and Processes in the Star Chamber. In 1634, he became clerk to His Majesty's Privy Council Extraordinary. He was re-elected for Cambridge for the Short Parliament in April 1640 when the other representative was Oliver Cromwell. He was knighted at Whitehall in 1641. He performed the duties of his office until August 1645 when the office became virtually extinct.

Meautys died at the age of 57 and was buried just in front of Bacon's monument.

== Family ==
In 1639 Meautys married Anne Bacon, a daughter of his cousin Jane (daughter of Thomas Meautys' senior's brother Hercules) and her husband Sir Nathaniel Bacon (Sir Francis Bacon's nephew), of Culford, Suffolk. They had a daughter who died in childhood. Anne later married Sir Harbottle Grimston.

Parliament of England
Preceded by Sir Robert Hitcham; Francis Brakyn	Member of Parliament for Cambridge; 1621–1622; With: Richard Foxton	Succeeded by Francis Brakyn; Robert Luckyn
Preceded by Francis Brakyn; Robert Luckyn	Member of Parliament for Cambridge; 1625–1629; With: Talbot Pepys 1625; Thomas Purchase 1626–1629	Parliament suspended until 1640
Parliament suspended since 1629	Member of Parliament for Cambridge; 1640; With: Oliver Cromwell	Succeeded by Oliver Cromwell; John Lowry
