= The Blue Anchor, St Albans =

Building in St Albans, Hertfordshire, England

Coordinates: 51.7543°N 0.3514°W

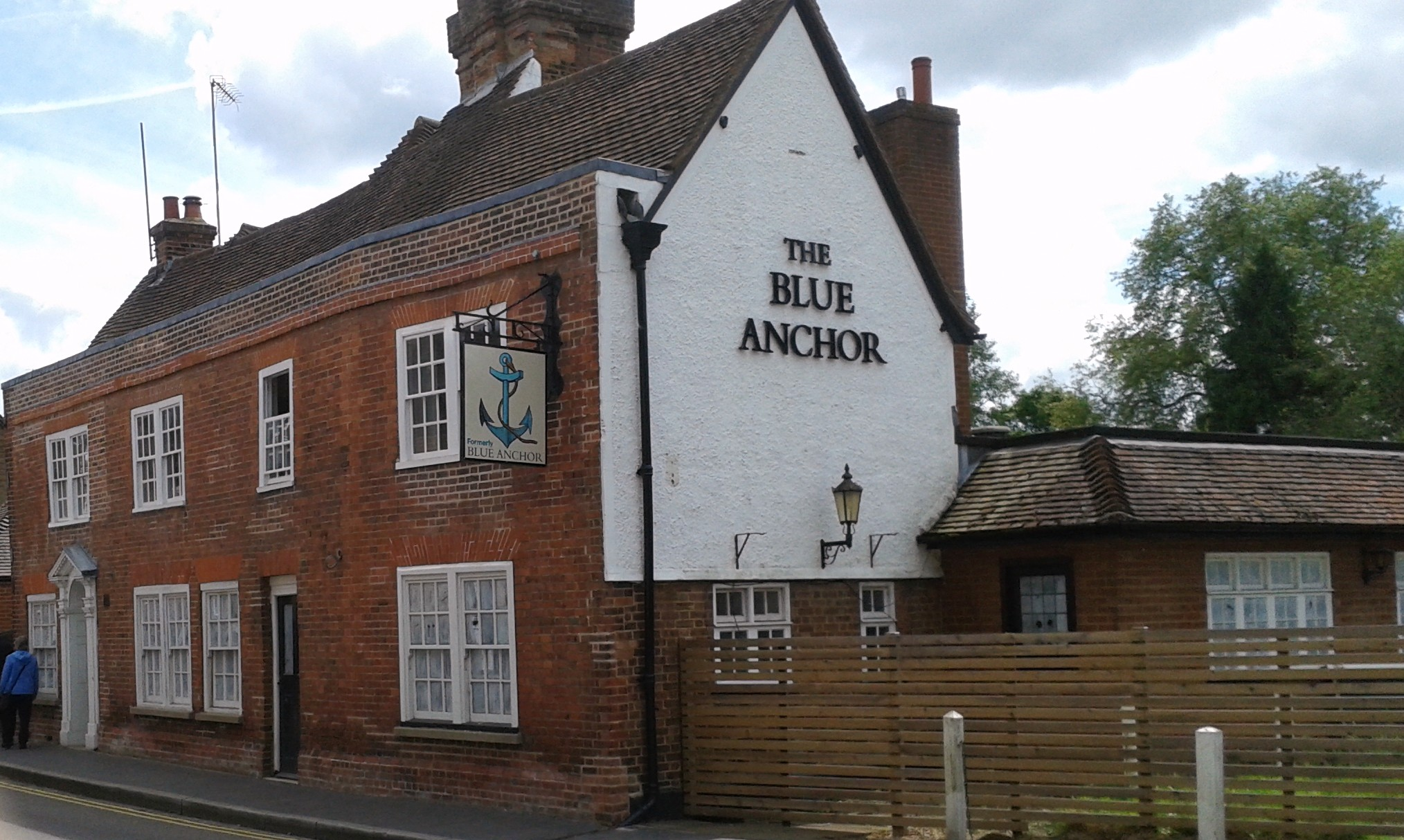
The Blue Anchor in 2017

The Blue Anchor was a public house in Fishpool Street, St Albans, Hertfordshire, England. The pub occupied an eighteenth-century building which was listed Grade II in 1971.

Fishpool Street was originally the main north-west coach route out of St Albans, and the district has other historic pubs, including The Six Bells. In 2015 the brewer McMullens said that it was difficult to find a tenant for the Blue Anchor. The building was later converted to residential use.
