= Moot Hall, St Albans =

Municipal building in St Albans, England

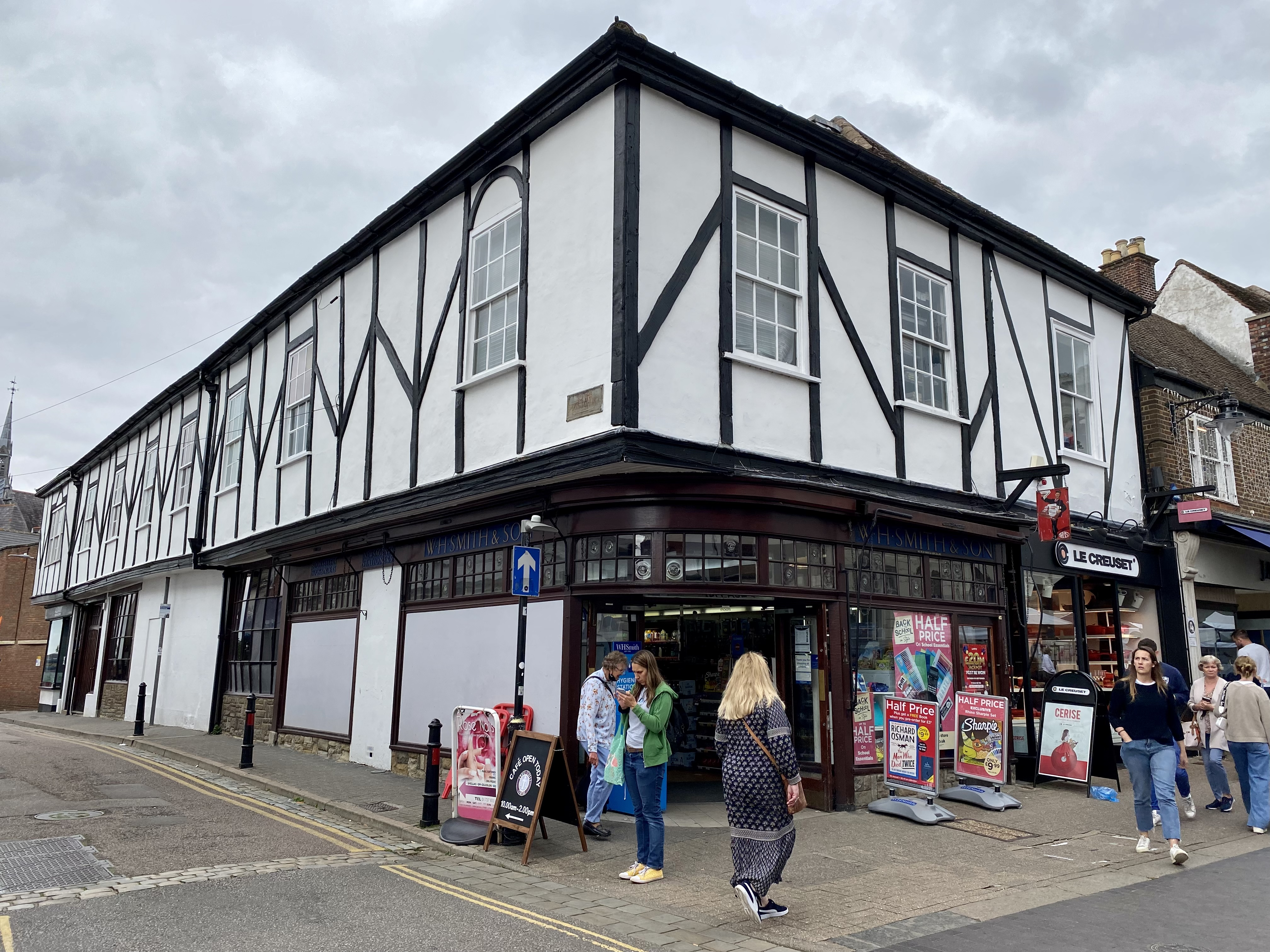
- Moot Hall, St Albans

- Shown in Hertfordshire
- 51.7522°N 0.3396°W
- Location: Market Place, St Albans

History
- Built: c.1570

Site notes
- Architectural style: Tudor style

Listed Building – Grade II
- Official name: The Old Moot House
- Designated: 27 August 1971
- Reference no.: 1103069

Listed Building – Grade II
- Official name: The Hertfordshire Advertiser
- Designated: 27 August 1971
- Reference no.: 1103029

Listed Building – Grade II
- Official name: 25 Market Place, 2 and 4 Upper Dagnall Street
- Designated: 27 August 1971
- Reference no.: 1347191

Listed Building – Grade II
- Official name: 27 Market Place
- Designated: 27 August 1971
- Reference no.: 1347170

The Moot Hall is a former municipal building in the Market Place in St Albans, Hertfordshire, England. The building, which now operates as two shops with office space above, is a Grade II listed building.

== History ==
The first moot hall was a medieval structure which had been built on the site of George Smith's Town Hall and dated back at least to the 14th century. It was in the first moot hall that 15 rebels, who took part in the Peasants' Revolt in 1381, were tried and convicted of destroying property and records belonging to St Albans Abbey.

The current moot hall, further to the south in the Market Place, was designed in the Tudor style using timber frame construction, and was completed around 1570. The design of the new building involved an asymmetrical main frontage of three bays facing onto the Market Place with a side elevation of eight bays stretching down Upper Dagnall Street. The first floor involved extensive use of jettied timber framing allowing the creation of extra space for the meeting room on that floor. A series of sash windows were installed on the first floor in the 18th century. Internally, the principal room was a long meeting room on the first floor known as the "town hall"; to the east of the meeting room i.e. at the front of the building was the jury room and to the west of the meeting room i.e. at the back was the council chamber. On the ground floor, there was a couple of rooms to accommodate the keeper, some stables for horses and a lock-up for incarcerating petty criminals.

The building was the venue for the quarter sessions for the Liberty of St Albans and also hosted meetings of the borough council until the council moved to the new Town Hall in 1826. The building was acquired by Harry Boome of London Colney in 1831. Part of the building was leased to the Hertfordshire Advertiser which printed its first edition there in 1855. The Boome family sold the building to Robert Gibbs, one of the founders of the Hertfordshire Advertiser, in 1884. Much of the building was then leased to a branch of WHSmith, and although St Albans Borough Council re-acquired ownership of the building in 1963, WHSmith has continued to occupy much of the building ever since.
