= St Albans Town Hall =

Municipal building in St Albans, Hertfordshire, England

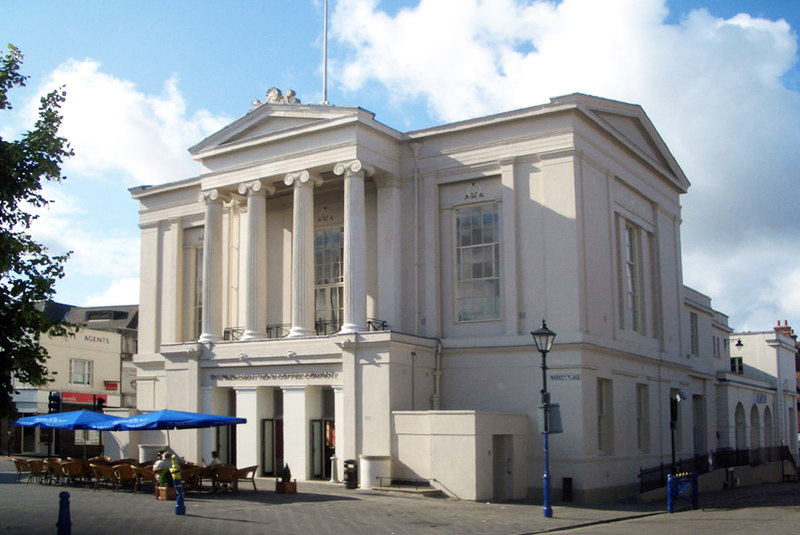
- St Albans Town Hall in 2008

- Shown in Hertfordshire
- 51°45′08″N 0°20′20″W
- Location: St Peter's Street, St Albans

History
- Built: 1826

Site notes
- Architect: George Smith
- Architectural style: Neoclassical style

Listed Building – Grade II*
- Official name: Court house (town hall)
- Designated: 8 May 1950
- Reference no.: 1296135

St Albans Town Hall, sometimes known as the Old Town Hall or The Courthouse, is a 19th-century building in St Albans, Hertfordshire, England. The building, which now accommodates the St Albans Museum, is a Grade II* listed building.

== History ==
The town hall was commissioned to replace the Moot Hall in the Market Place which was completed in 1570. When the moot hall became dilapidated, a discussion took place on the location of the new building: the justices preferred a site in Romeland whereas civic leaders preferred St Peter's Street. It was eventually agreed to proceed with a new building, which would accommodate both a town hall and a courtroom, in St Peter's Street. The new building, which was designed by George Smith in the neoclassical style was completed in 1826.

=== Legal history ===
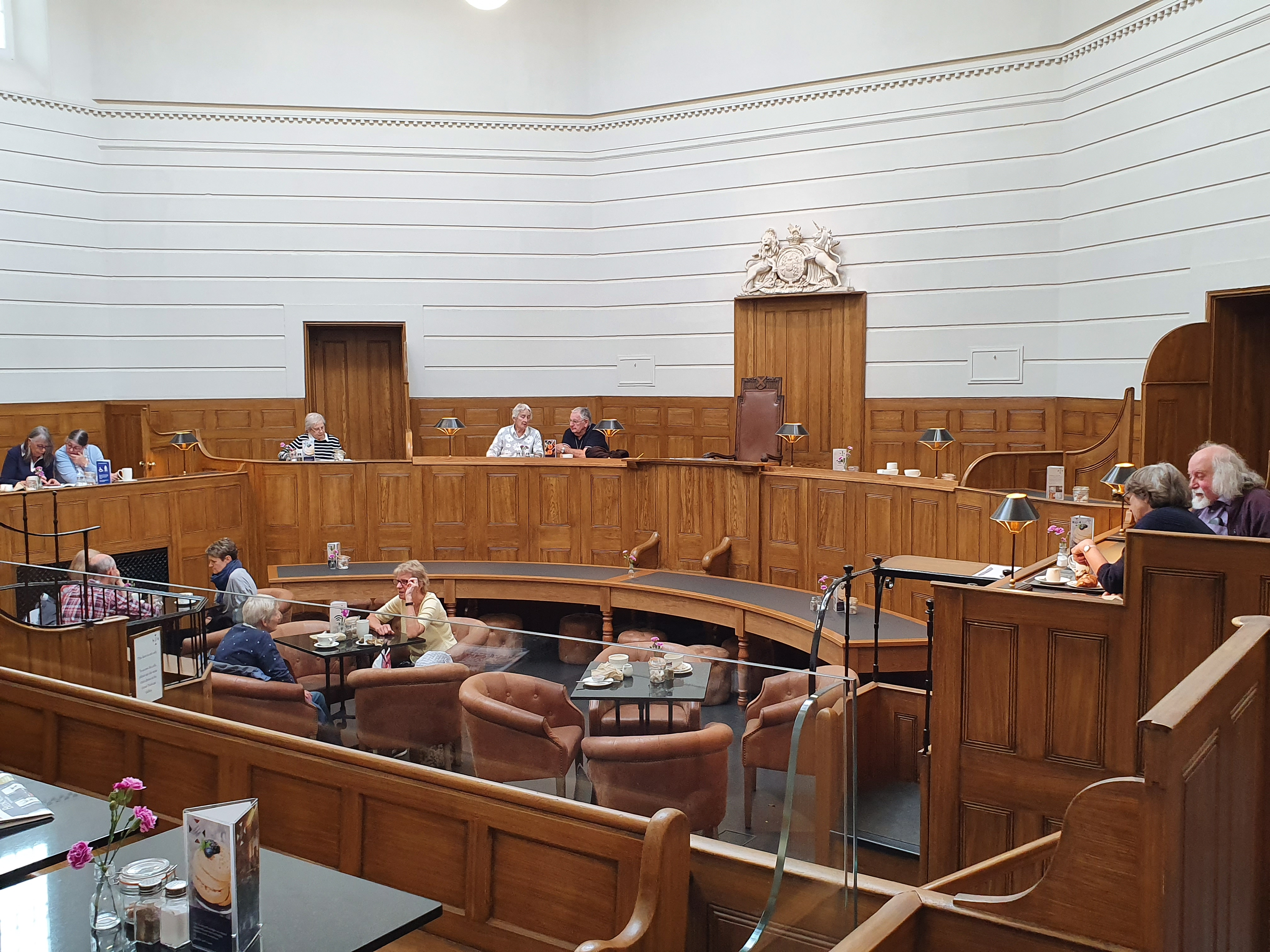
The courtroom

St Albans had its own quarter sessions because of the existence of the Liberty of St Albans when the building was constructed.

The Bribery Commission held hearings in the building in 1851 to investigate the "cash for votes" scandal which had involved the local Whig Party candidate, Jacob Bell, buying votes, typically at £5 per vote; the Commissioners found that some 308 voters had received money for their votes and they decided that the Borough of St Albans should lose its parliamentary representation (the constituency was re-established in an enlarged form in 1885).

In 1874, for judicial purposes, Hertfordshire was divided into two divisions by Act of Parliament, the eastern part of the county to be the Hertford division and the western part to be known as the Liberty of St Albans Division, each maintaining separate quarter sessions, but being a single commission of the peace. The Act made clear that, despite its name, the St Albans division was not to be deemed a liberty in any future legislation. Following the implementation of the Courts Act 1971, the assizes and the quarter sessions were superseded by crown court hearings on 1 January 1972.

The town hall ceased to a venue for judicial purposes when crown court hearings moved to a new courthouse in Bricket Road in 1992.

=== Local government ===
The town hall continued to serve as the headquarters of St Albans City Council during first half of the 20th century. The building also served as the meeting place of St Albans Rural District Council between 1895 and 1929. St Albans City Council moved to a new City Hall further north along St Peter's Street in 1966, which was in turn replaced by a new Civic Centre in 1989.

Following a programme of conversion works costing £7.75 million carried out to a design by John McAslan and Partners, the St Albans Museum, which had been located in Hatfield Road until it closed in that location in September 2015, re-opened in the town hall in June 2018.

== Architecture ==
The design involves a symmetrical main frontage with three bays facing onto the Market Square; the central bay features a podium on the ground floor containing three sash windows supporting a tetrastyle portico with Ionic order columns and a large entablature and pediment above. Internally, the principal rooms are the assembly hall, which also functions as a ballroom, and the courtroom, which has an octagonal shape and is panelled.

== See also ==
- St Albans Museums
