= The Six Bells =

Public house in St Albans

Coordinates: 51°45′14″N 0°21′15″W

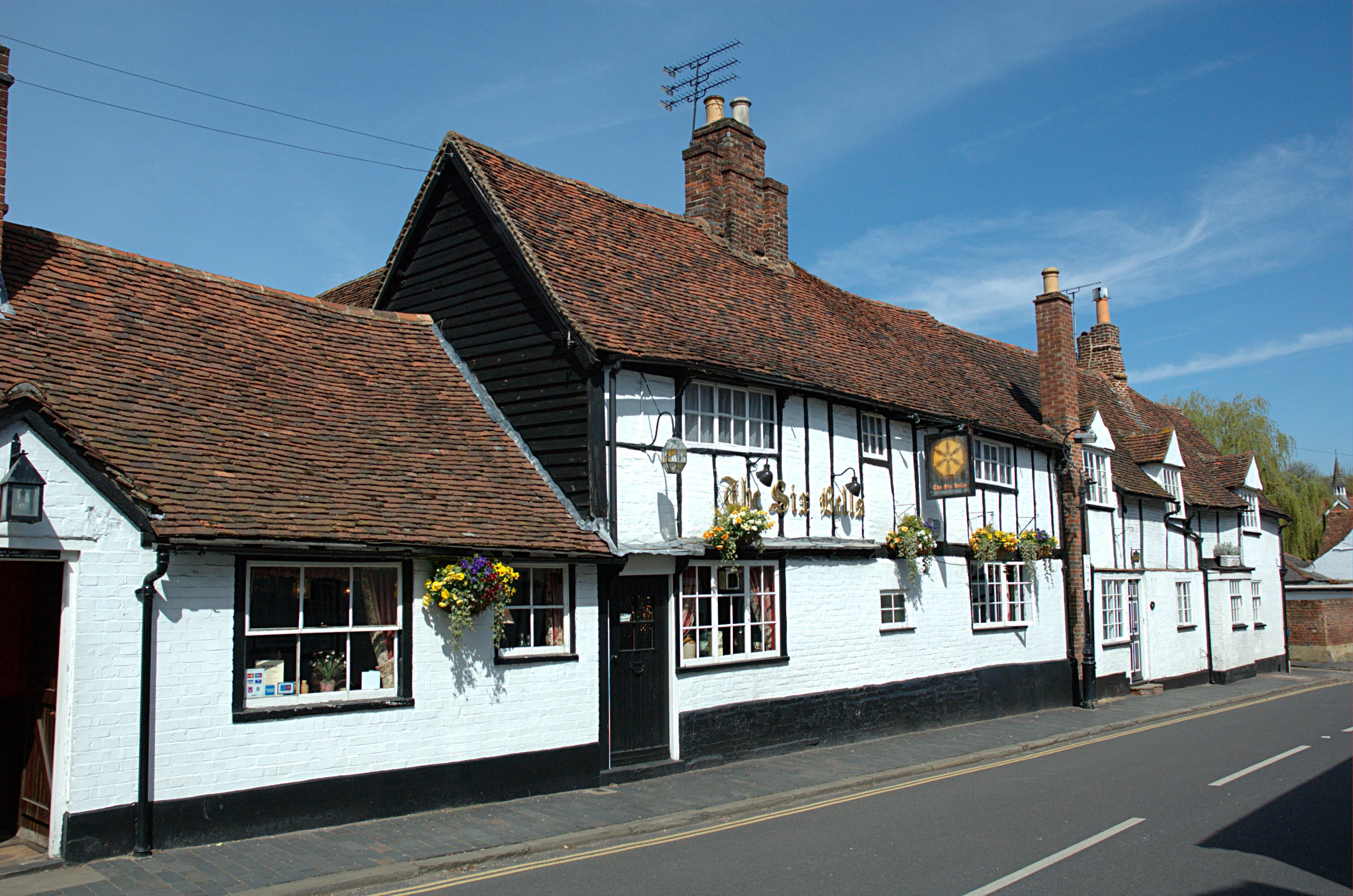
- The Six Bells. 16-18 St Michael's Street
- Interactive map of the The Six Bells area

General information
- Type: Public House and Roman ruins
- Architectural style: Vernacular (pub), classical (baths)

Technical details
- Structural system: Timber-framing (pub), masonry (baths)

Website
- the-six-bells.com

Listed Building – Grade II
- Official name: The Six Bells
- Designated: 1971
- Reference no.: 1103083

The Six Bells is a public house in St Michael's Street in St Albans, Hertfordshire, England. The seventeenth-century timber-framed building is situated within the walls of the Roman city of Verulamium.

== History ==
The pub is built on the site of a Roman bath house. This facility was relatively new when the Boudican revolt occurred. It appears to have been damaged when Boudica sacked Verulamium in AD 60 or AD 61. After the city recovered, the baths were replaced on a different site.

The name of the pub refers to the bells of the medieval St Michael's Church nearby. The name appears to have been adopted in the 18th century, when the church had six bells; it now has more.

== Conservation and excavation ==
The building has been protected since 1971 and is listed grade II by Historic England.

There were two digs in the 20th century, and there has been one in the 21st (in 2012 the pub was featured in an episode of the TV series Rory McGrath's Pub Dig, a couple of trenches being dug in the car park).
