= Richard Foxton =

English politician

Richard Foxton (died 1648) was an English politician who sat in the House of Commons in 1621.

Foxton was the son of William Foxton, alderman of Cambridge. He was admitted at Emmanuel College, Cambridge on 3 October 1590 and was admitted at the Middle Temple on 19 April 1597. He was mayor of Cambridge from 1619 to 1621. In 1621, he was elected Member of Parliament for Cambridge but, as he was still mayor, his election was declared void.

Foxton was a Parliamentarian member of the Eastern Counties Association and was a commissioner for the collection of taxes in Cambridge.

Foxton died in 1648 and was buried in Great St Mary's church on 8 December 1648. He left £40 to the University Library.

Parliament of England
Preceded by Sir Robert Hitcham; Francis Brakin	Member of Parliament for Cambridge; 1621; With: Thomas Meautys	Succeeded by Francis Brakyn; Robert Luckyn
