= Verulam House, St Albans (17th century) =

Building in St Albans, England

Verulam House
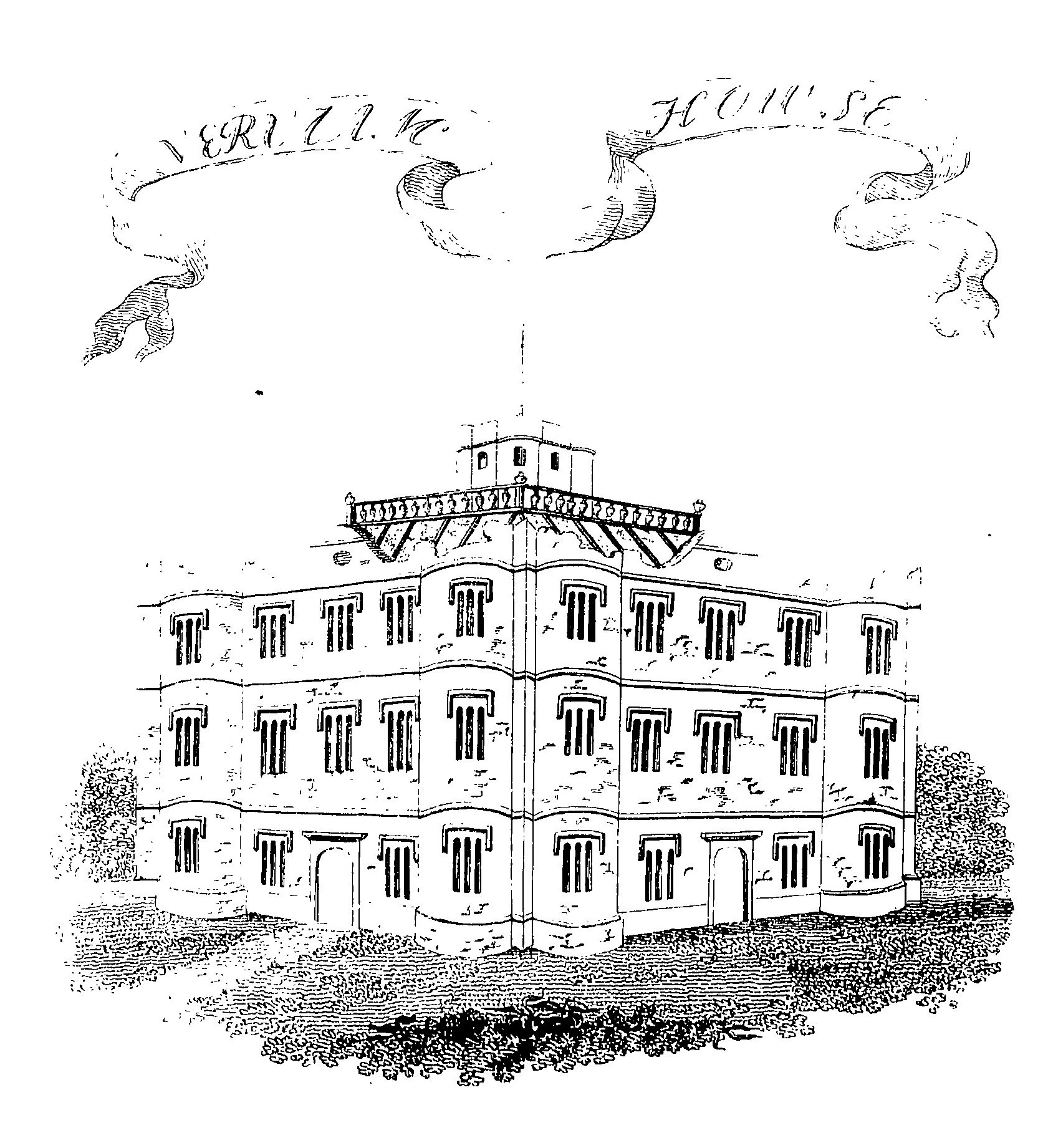
- Verulam House, from The Oxford cabinet, consisting of engravings from original pictures, in the Ashmolean Museum, and other public and private collections; with biographical anecdotes, by John Aubrey, F.R.S. and other celebrated writers (1797)
- Etymology: Verulamium

General information
- Status: Demolished
- Location: St Albans
- Year built: c. 1617
- Demolished: c. 1665
- Cost: £9000-£10,000
- Owner: Francis Bacon; Thomas Meautys; Sir Harbottle Grimston; George Grimston; Sarah Seymour

Verulam House was a building in St Albans, built by Francis Bacon to supplement his family home of Gorhambury. The main source describing it is John Aubrey's Brief Lives (1669-1696). It was named after Verulamium, the ancient Roman city of St Albans, though it was not sited within that city's walls as Aubrey asserted.

== History ==
Bacon completed it around 1617, partly motivated by a drought which starved the advanced plumbing system built at Gorhambury by his father - Bacon stated that "since he could not carry the water to his house, he would carry his house to the water". He picked a site next to water gardens he had already constructed and Aubrey writes that he was assisted in the designs by the father of the painter William Dobson. Again according to Aubrey, it cost £9000-£10,000 and included underground larders, an underground kitchen and two rooms for Turkish baths.

Bacon died childless and so his will conveyed Verulam House to trustees for the use of his secretary Thomas Meautys. It then passed to Bacon's widow Anne's second husband Sir Harbottle Grimston, who assigned Verulam House to his son George upon the latter's marriage. It was occupied by George's widow after his death without issue. Neglected during the English Civil War, it was demolished in 1663 or 1665-1666 and the materials sold off to two carpenters for £400, who then sold them on for double the price they had paid for them.
