= Verulamium Forum inscription =

Roman inscription in St Albans, England

The Verulamium Forum Inscription (tentatively dated to AD 79, during the reign of the emperor Titus) is one of the many Roman inscriptions in Britain. It is also known as the "Basilica inscription", as it is believed to have been attached to the basilica of Verulamium (on the edge of modern St Albans). The surviving fragments have been reconstructed as a large dedication slab (approx. 4.3m x 1.0m) on display at Verulamium Museum.

The fragments were found in 1955 during construction work in the yard of St Michael's Primary School, St Albans. The find-spot lay near the north-east entrance to the forum and basilica of Verulamium. Aside from being one of the earliest extant Roman monumental inscriptions in Britain, the inscription is also notable because it mentions Gnaeus Julius Agricola, the Roman governor of Britain from AD 77–84, who is otherwise known from a biography written by his son-in-law Tacitus.

== Text ==
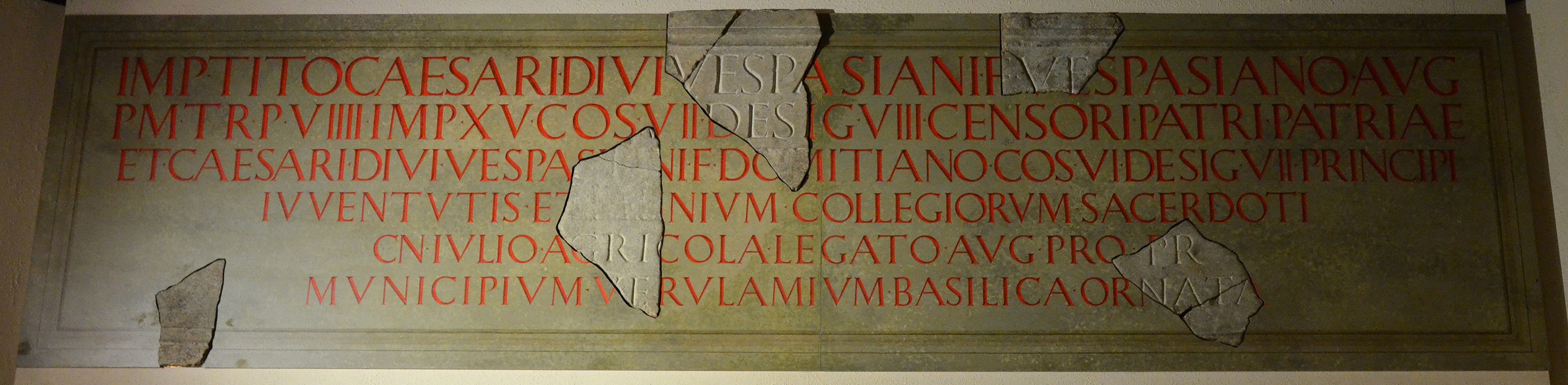
The reconstructed inscription is preserved in Verulamium Museum.

The inscription was reconstructed by Professor Sheppard Frere to read as follows:

[IMP TITO CAESARI DIVI] VESPA[SIANI] F VES[PASIANO AUG]
[P M TR P VIIII IMP XV COS VII] DESI[G VIII CENSORI PATRI PATRIAE]
[ [ ET CAESARI DIVI VESPASIANI F DOMITIANO COS VI DESIG VII PRINCIPI ] ]
[ [ IVVENTVTIS ET OMNIVM COLLEGIORVM SACERDOTI ] ]
[CN IVLIO A]GRIC[OLA LEGATO AUG PRO] PR
[MVNICIPIVM] VE[RVLAMIVM BASILICA OR]NATA

This version would be expanded to read:

IMP(eratori) TITO CAESARI DIVI VESPASIANI F(ilio) VESPASIANO AVG(usto)
P(ontifici) M(aximo) TR(ibuniciae) P(otestatis) VIIII IMP(eratori) XV CO(n)S(uli) VII DESIG(nato) VIII CENSORI PATRI PATRIAE
ET CAESARI DIVI VESPASIANI F(ilio) DOMITIANO CO(n)S(uli) VI DESIG(nato) VII PRINCIPI IVVENTVTIS ET OMNIVM COLLEGIORVM SACERDOTI
GN(aeo) IVLIO AGRICOLA LEGATO AVG(usti) PRO PR(aetore)
MVNICIPIVM VERVLAMIVM BASILICA ORNATA

This translates as:

For the Emperor Titus Caesar Vespasian Augustus, son of the deified Vespasian,
Pontifex Maximus, in the ninth year of tribunician power, acclaimed Imperator fifteen times, having been consul seven times, designated consul for an eighth time, censor, Father of the Fatherland,
and to Caesar Domitian, son of the deified Vespasian, having been consul six times, designated consul for a seventh term, Prince of Youth, and member of all the priestly brotherhoods,
when Gnaeus Julius Agricola was legate of the emperor with pro-praetorian power,
the Verulamium basilica was adorned.

The last line is particularly fragmentary, and the alternative reconstruction CIVITAS CATVVELLAVNORVM FORO EXORNATA ("the forum of the Catuvellaunian tribal council was embellished") has been considered, along with the less likely RESPVBLICA VERVLAMIVM LATIO DONA ("... donated the funds to widen the Verulamium public-works").

The inscription can be dated either to AD 79, the year Vespasian died (he would not have been referred to as divus until after his death) and Titus had his seventh consulship, or to AD 81 (by altering the various numerals). The reference to his brother Domitian was defaced, as were most inscriptions referring to him, after damnatio memoriae was pronounced on him in 96.

== Publication ==
The inscription has been published as:

- L'Année épigraphique (AE) 1957, 169
- Roman Inscriptions of Britain (RIB) 3123

== See also ==
- St Albans Museums
