= St Albans Museums =

Local museums in St Albans, Hertfordshire, England

Coordinates: 51°45′08″N 0°20′20″W

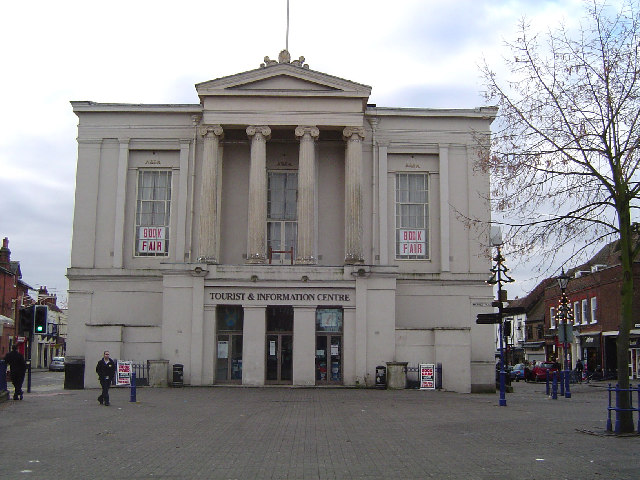
- The Grade II* listed town hall, which houses the St Albans Museum + Gallery
- Established: 1898
- Location: Town Hall, St Peter's Street, St Albans AL1 3DH
- Website: stalbansmuseums.org.uk/

St Albans Museums is a collection of museums and historic buildings in the city of St Albans, Hertfordshire, England that is run by St Albans City and District Council. It oversees St Albans Museum + Gallery and the Verulamium Museum, and also the Hypocaust Museum at Verulamium, St Albans' medieval Clock Tower, and the ruins of Sopwell Priory.

== St Albans Museum + Gallery ==
St Albans Museum + Gallery presents the history and art of St Albans. There are various galleries to explore and the exhibitions change often. It has hosted national touring exhibitions as well as locally curated exhibitions. The museum sometimes includes art exhibitions that are curated by the University of Hertfordshire with which the museums have a partnership.

The museum was founded as the Hertfordshire County Museum in 1898. Its Hatfield Road venue was closed to the public in September 2015 as part of project to regenerate the Old Town Hall as a Museum and Gallery hosting changing exhibits and exhibitions. Although the previous building had less space than the current one it still had a wonderful display of artifacts from the post Roman era, Saxon brooches, coins, carved stonework such as part of a church window frame depicting a Saxon warrior, plus Norman, later medieval and Tudor items on display. The town hall exhibits are only a fraction of what the previous museum had to offer and are now in storage. Although new and never seen before exhibits are due to make an appearance at some point. The new Museum+ Gallery opened in 2018 in the old town hall [a grade II Listed building] in St Albans city centre.

== Verulamium Museum ==
Verulamium Museum is situated in what was once the forum of the walled city of Verulamium, next to Verulamium Park. The museum contains information about the Iron Age and Roman periods of St Albans' history. The later history of the settlement is presented at the St Albans Museum + Gallery.

The Verulamium Museum was established following the excavations carried out by Mortimer Wheeler and his wife, Tessa Wheeler, both of them renowned archaeologists, during the 1930s. It was extended in 1996–97. During the building work, an excavation of the site took place.

== Gallery ==
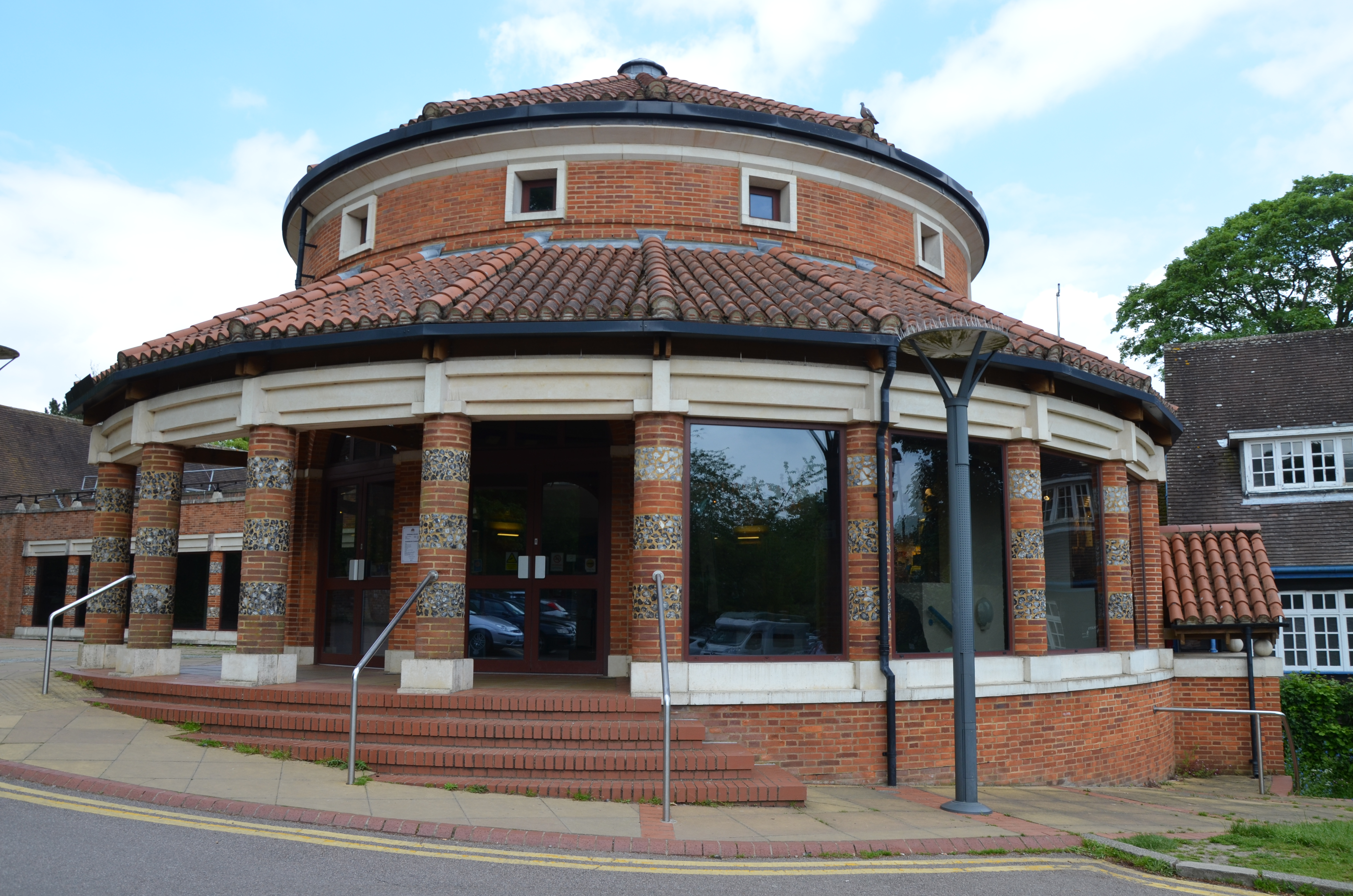
Verulamium Museum

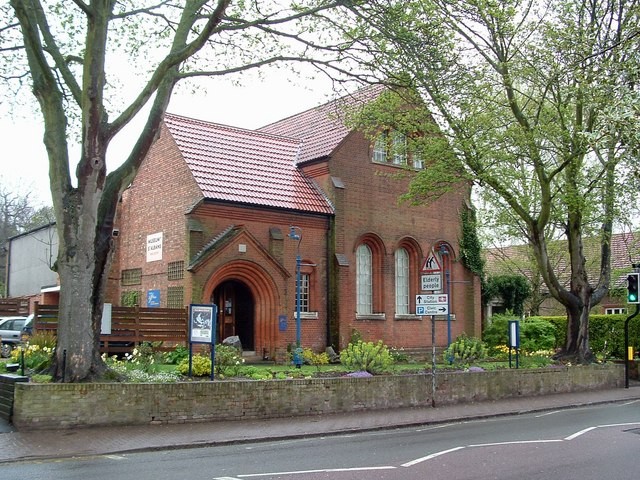
The old Hatfield Road building, which previously housed the St Albans Museum's main collection. It has now been turned into housing.

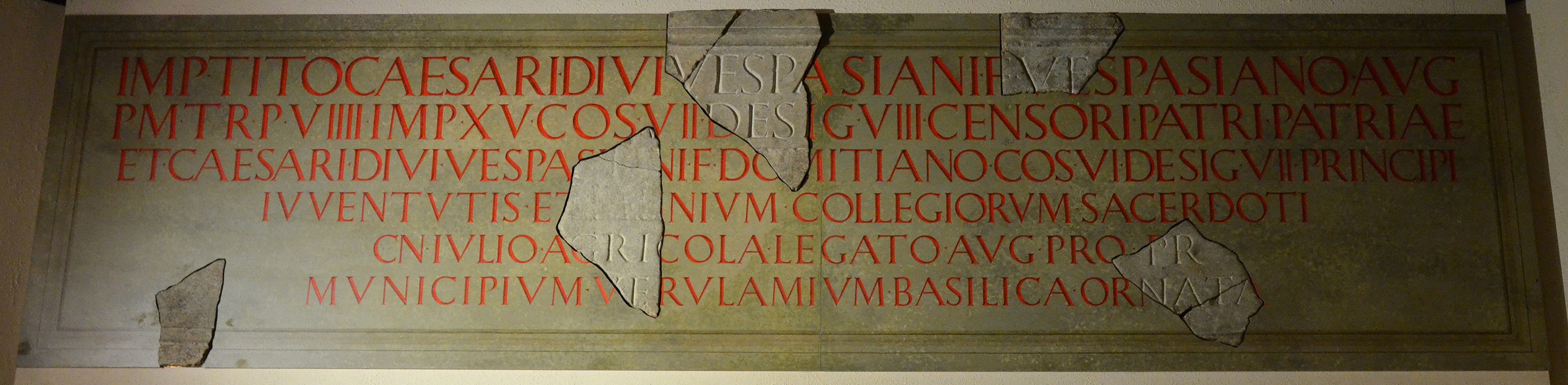
The reconstructed Verulamium Forum inscription is preserved in Verulamium Museum.

== See also ==
- Clock Tower, St Albans
- St Albans Town Hall
- Kingsbury Watermill Museum
- Sopwell Priory
- Verulamium Forum inscription
- List of museums in Hertfordshire
