= Verulamium =

Ancient town in Roman Britain

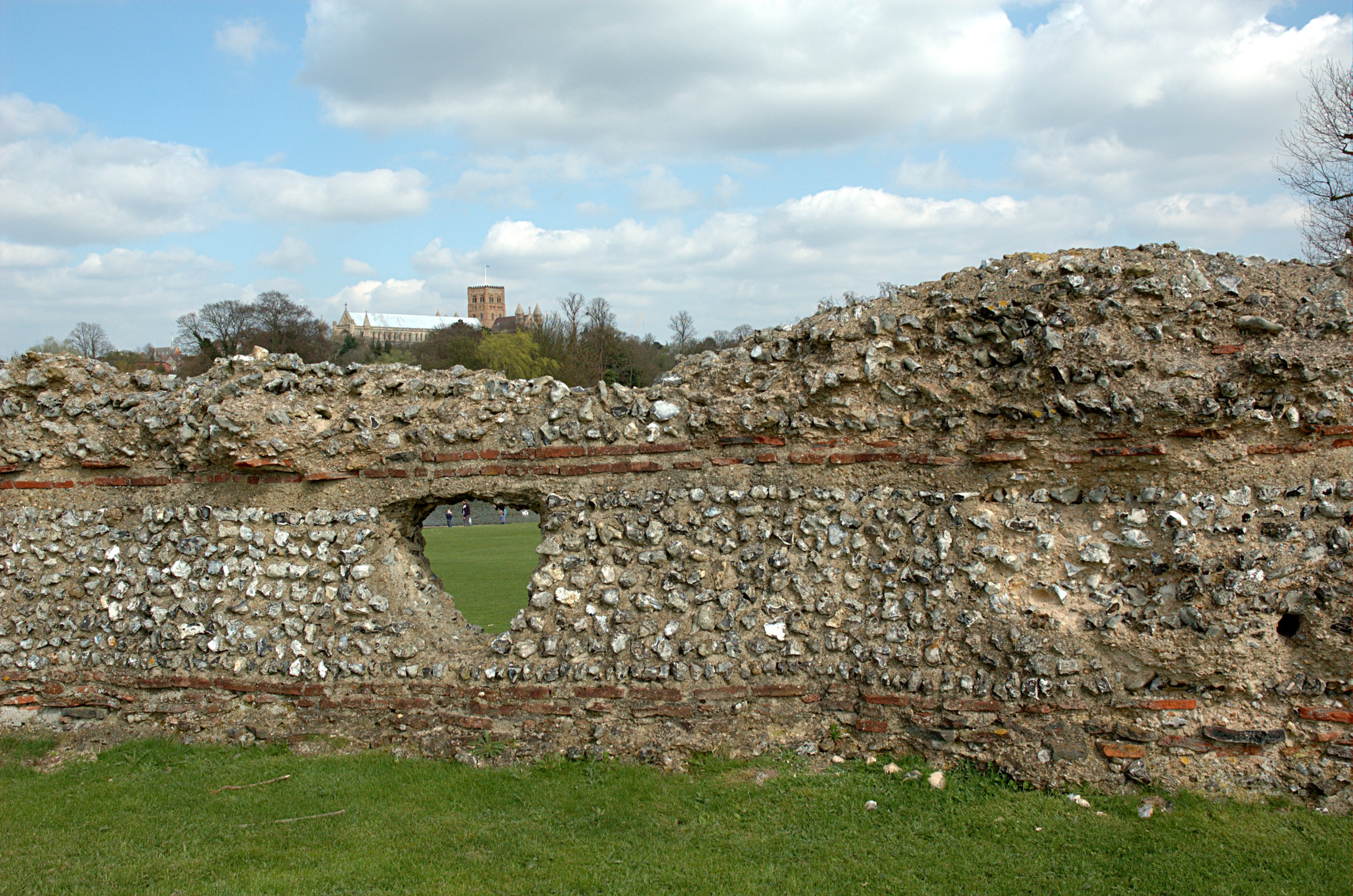
- Remains of the city walls, with distinctive Roman brick tiles. St Albans Cathedral is in the background.

- Location within Hertfordshire Location within England
- 51.7500°N 0.3539°W
- Location: Hertfordshire, England
- OS grid reference: TL136070

Watling Street north of St Albans. The map shows the Roman towns established along Watling Street by the end of the first century AD.

Verulamium was a town in Roman Britain. It was sited southwest of the modern city of St Albans in Hertfordshire, England. The major ancient Roman route Watling Street passed through the city, but was realigned in medieval times to bring trade to St Albans. It was about a day's walk from London.

A large portion of the Roman city remains unexcavated, being now park and agricultural land. Due to ploughing on the privately owned agricultural land which formed half of the city, a lot of damage has been done, as proven by parts of mosaic floors that have been found on the surface. Results of ground-penetrating radar show outlines of buildings as smudges rather than clearly defined walls like those protected by the parkland. Part of the Roman city has been built upon, such as the small settlement around the Anglo-Saxon St Michael's Church. Much of the site and its environs is now a scheduled monument.

== History ==
Before the Romans established their settlement, there was already a tribal centre in the area which belonged to the Catuvellauni. This settlement is usually called Verlamion. The etymology is uncertain, but the name has been reconstructed as *Uerulāmion, which would have a meaning like "[the tribe or settlement] of the broad hand" (Uerulāmos) in Brittonic. In this pre-Roman form, it was among the first places in Britain recorded by name. The settlement was established by Tasciovanus, who minted coins there.

The Roman settlement was granted the rank of municipium around AD 50, meaning its citizens had what were known as "Latin Rights", a lesser citizenship status than a colonia possessed. It grew to a significant town, and as such received the attentions of Boudica of the Iceni in 61, when Verulamium was sacked and burnt on her orders: a black ash layer has been recorded by archaeologists, thus confirming the Roman written record. The rebuilt town grew steadily; by the early 3rd century, it covered an area of about 125 acres (0.51 km^{2}), behind a deep ditch and wall. It is the location of the martyrdom of the first British martyr saint, Saint Alban, who was a Roman patrician converted by the priest Amphibalus.

Verulamium contained a forum, basilica and a theatre, much of which was damaged during two fires, one in 155 and the other in around 250. One of the few extant Roman inscriptions in Britain was found in the remnants of the forum (see Verulamium Forum inscription). The town was rebuilt in stone rather than timber at least twice over the next 150 years. Occupation by the Romans ended between AD 400 and 450.

== Remains of the Roman period ==
As well as the items in the museum, there are a few remains of the Roman city visible, including

- parts of the city walls. These originally surrounded the city apart from a section protected by the River Ver
- a hypocaust still in situ under a mosaic floor,
- the theatre

Although there are other Roman theatres in Britain (for example at Camulodunum), the one at Verulamium has been claimed to be the only full excavated example of its kind, being a theatre with a stage rather than an amphitheatre. The theatre is on the grounds of and therefore run by the Gorhambury Estate.

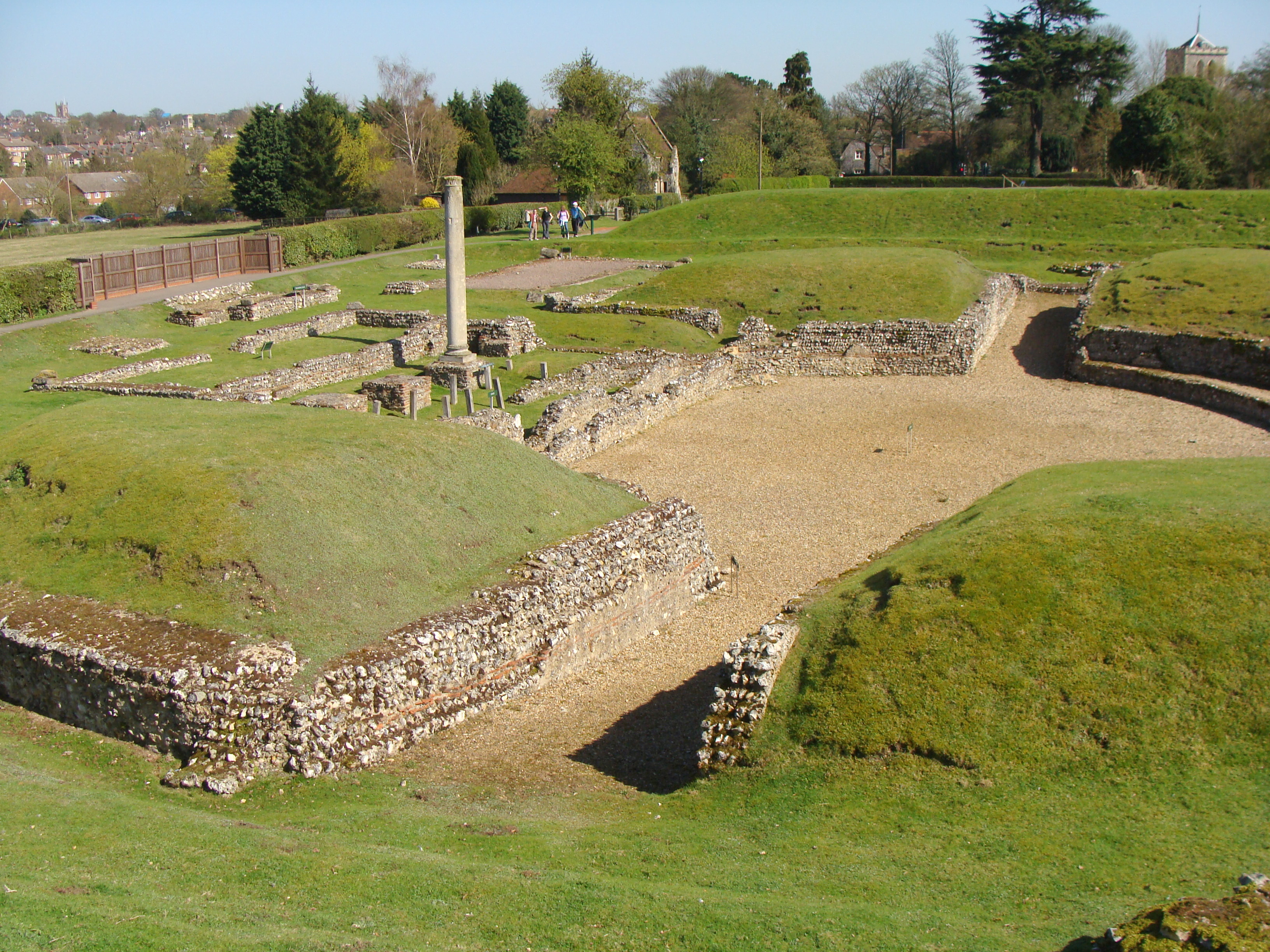
Roman Theatre, St Albans

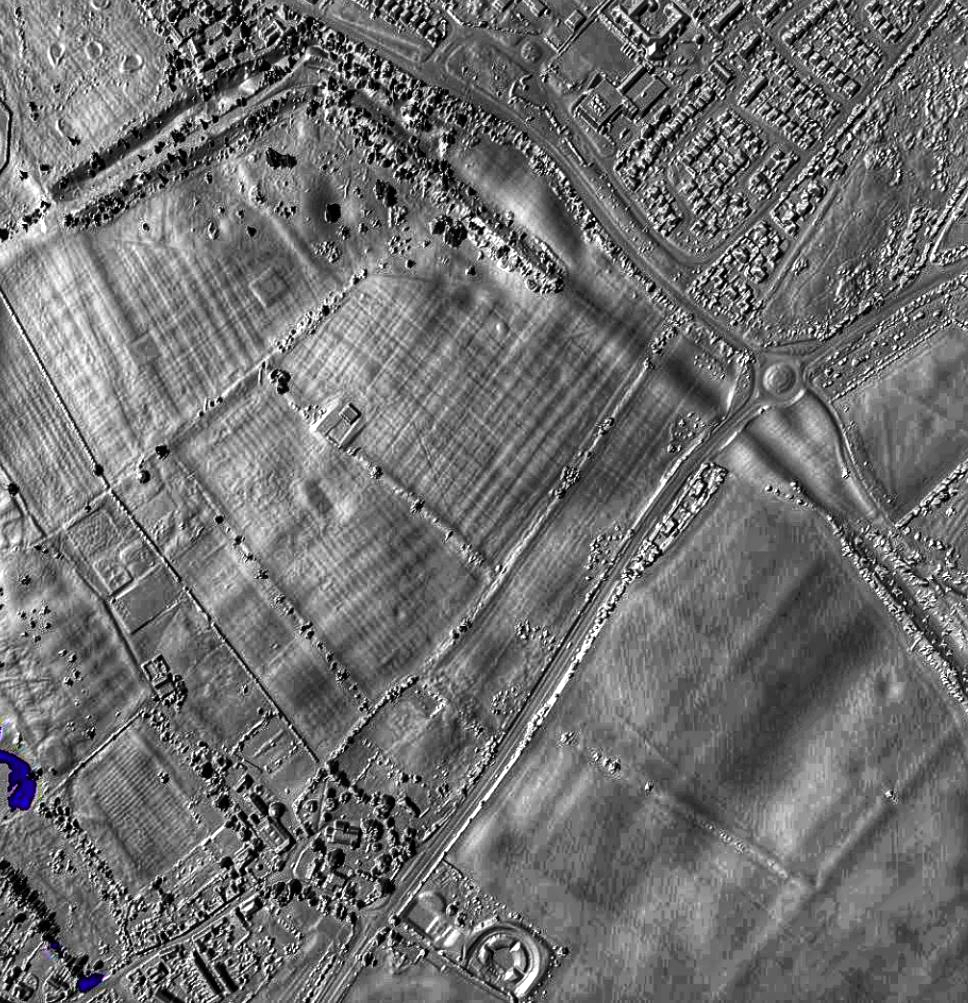
A lidar view of part of Verulamium including the Roman theatre

More remains under the nearby agricultural land, which have never been excavated, were for a while seriously threatened by deep ploughing. Recent results of GPR (ground-penetrating radar) have revealed more damage than originally thought has been done to most buildings, especially the north-western part of the old Roman city.

Verulamium is mentioned in a Latin inscription on a wax tablet, dated to AD 62, discovered in London during the Bloomberg excavations, 2010–14:

P(ublio) Mario Ce<lso=XIII> L(ucio) Afinio Gallo co(n)s(ulibus) XII Kal(endas) Nove//mbr(es) M(arcus) Renn[iu]s Venusrus me condux{s}isse a C(aio) Valerio Proculo ut intra Idus Novembres perferret a [[Londi]] Verulamio penoris onera viginti in singula |(denarii) quadrans vecturae ea condicione ut per me mora |(assem) I Londinium quod si ulnam om[n]e[m]

In the consulship of Publius Marius Celsus and Lucius Afinius Gallus, on the 12th day before the Kalends of November (21 October AD 62). I, Marcus Rennius Venustus, (have written and say that) I have contracted with Gaius Valerius Proculus that he bring from Verulamium by the Ides of November (13 November) 20 loads of provisions at a transport-charge of one-quarter denarius for each, on condition that … one as … to London; but if … the whole …

== Post-Roman times ==
St Albans Abbey and the associated Anglo-Saxon settlement were founded on a hill outside the Roman city. The site of the abbey may have been a location where there was reason to believe that St Alban was executed or buried. More certainly, the abbey is near the site of a Roman cemetery, which, as was normal in Roman times, was outside the city walls. It is unknown whether there are Roman remains under the medieval abbey. An archaeological excavation in 1978, directed by Martin Biddle, failed to find Roman remains on the site of the medieval chapter house.

David Nash Ford identifies the community as the Cair Mincip ("Fort Municipium") listed by Nennius among the 28 cities of Britain in his History of the Britons. As late as the eighth century the Saxon inhabitants of St Albans nearby were aware of their ancient neighbour, which they knew alternatively as Verulamacæstir or, under what H. R. Loyn terms "their own hybrid", Vaeclingscæstir, "the fortress of the followers of Wæcla".

== Loss and recovery ==
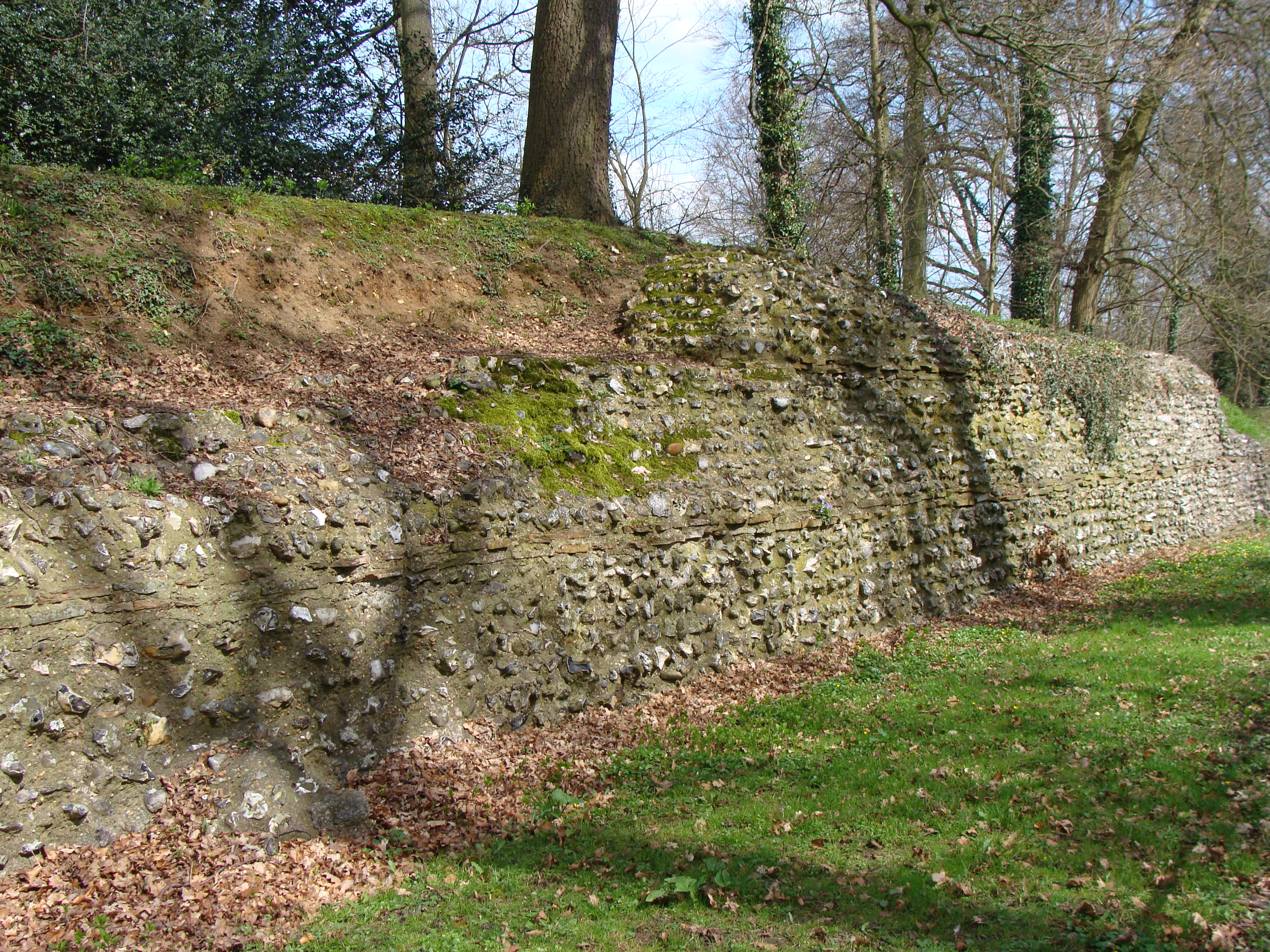
Stretch of Roman wall by the London Gate

The city was quarried for building material for the construction of medieval St Albans; indeed, much of the Norman abbey was constructed from the remains of the Roman city, with Roman brick and stone visible. The modern city takes its name from Alban, either a citizen of Verulamium or a Roman soldier, who was condemned to death in the 3rd century for sheltering Amphibalus, a Christian. Alban was converted by him to Christianity, and by virtue of his death, Alban became the first British Christian martyr.

Since much of the modern city and its environs are built over Roman remains, it is still common to unearth Roman artefacts several miles away. A complete tile kiln was found in Park Street some six miles (9.7 km) from Verulamium in the 1970s, and there is a Roman mausoleum near Rothamsted Park five miles (8.0 km) away.

Within the walls of ancient Verulamium, the Elizabethan philosopher, essayist and statesman Sir Francis Bacon built a "refined small house" called Verulam House that was thoroughly described by the 17th-century diarist John Aubrey. No trace of it is left, but Aubrey noted, "At Verulam is to be seen, in some few places, some remains of the wall of this [Roman] Citie".

Moreover, when Bacon was ennobled in 1618, he took the title Baron Verulam after Verulamium. The barony became extinct after he died without heirs in 1626.

This title was revived in 1790 for James Grimston, a Hertfordshire politician. He was later made Earl of Verulam, a title still held by his descendants.

== Verulamium Museum ==
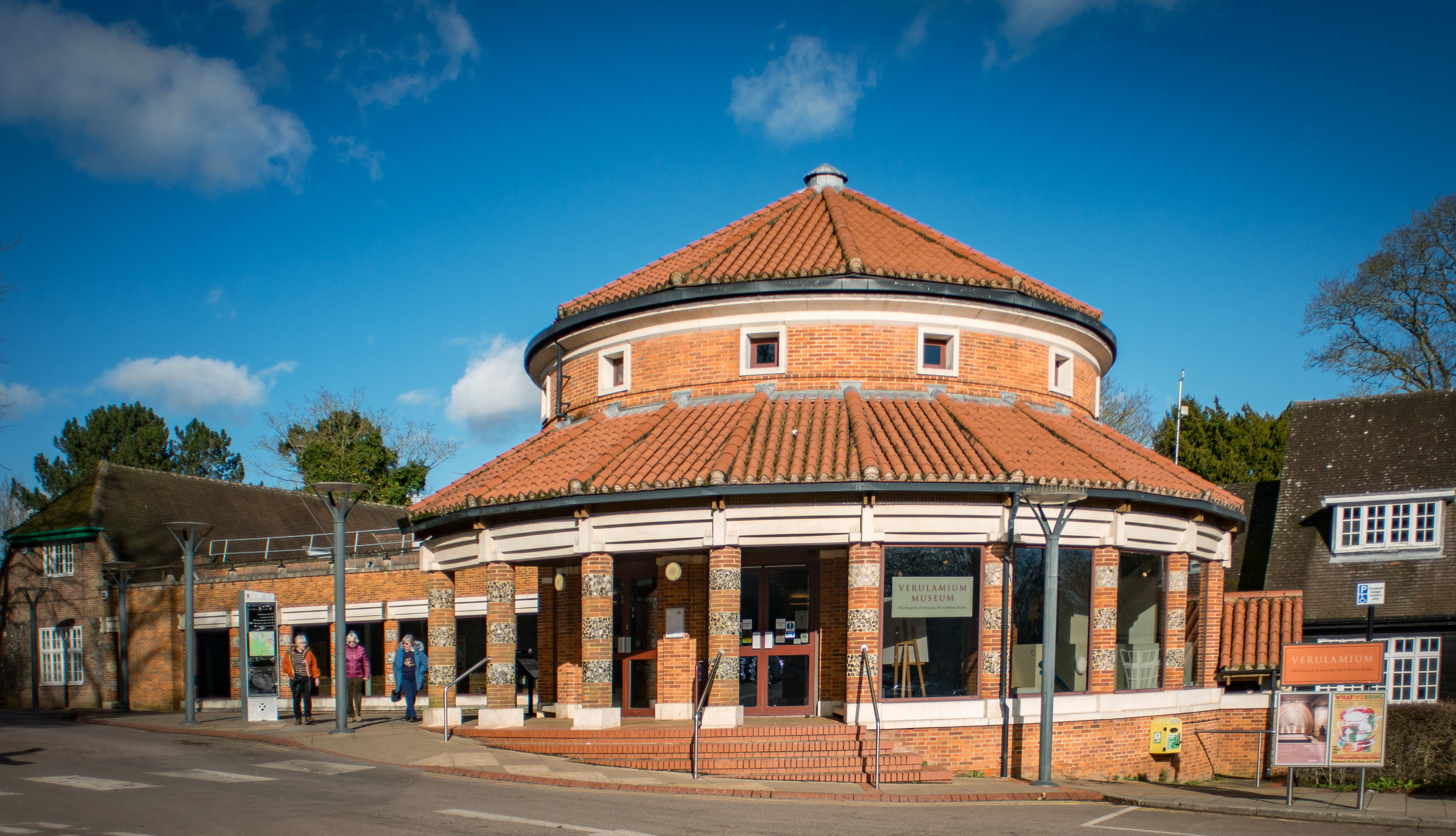
The Verulamium Museum

The Verulamium Museum, part of St Albans Museums, is on a site once occupied by the forum. It is now on the edge of Verulamium Park.

The museum contains much information about the town, both as a Roman and Iron Age settlement, plus Roman history in general. It was established following the excavations carried out by Mortimer Wheeler and his wife, Tessa Wheeler, during the 1930s. It is run by the district council.

=== Collections ===
It is noted for the large and colourful mosaics and many other artefacts, such as pottery, jewellery, tools and coins, from the Roman period. Many items were found in formal excavations, but some, including the Verulamium Forum inscription and a coffin still containing a male skeleton, were unearthed nearby during building work.

== Other ==
The asteroid 4206 Verulamium was named in honour of the ancient city.

== See also ==
- St Albans Museums
- Verulamium Forum inscription
