= St Michael's Church, St Albans =

Church in Hertfordshire, England

Coordinates: 51°45′10″N 0°21′25″W

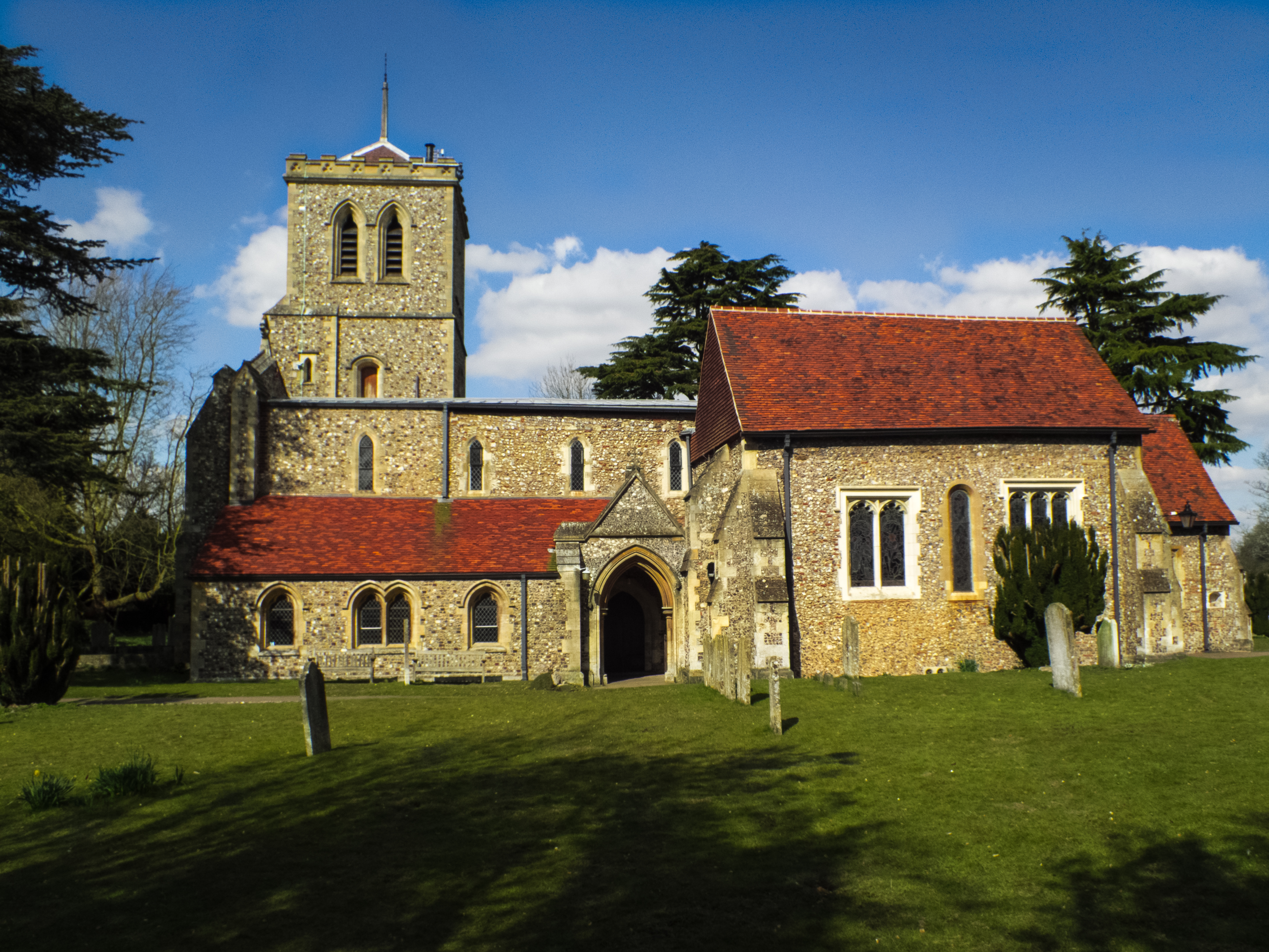
- St Michael's church and churchyard from the south

- Shown within Hertfordshire
- Denomination: Church of England
- Previous denomination: Roman Catholic
- Churchmanship: Broad Church

History
- Founder: Abbot Ulsinus
- Dedication: St Michael

Architecture
- Heritage designation: Grade I listed
- Designated: 8 May 1950
- Architect(s): 19th-century alterations by: George Gilbert Scott; Edmund Beckett
- Style: Anglo-Saxon, Norman, Early English, Decorated Gothic, Perpendicular Gothic
- Completed: late 10th or early 11th century

Administration
- Province: Canterbury
- Diocese: St Albans
- Archdeaconry: St Albans
- Deanery: St Albans
- Parish: St Michael, St Albans with St Mary, Childwick Green

Clergy
- Vicar: The Revd Jonathan Lloyd

St Michael's Church is a Church of England parish church in St Albans, Hertfordshire, England. Much of the building is late 10th or early 11th century, making it the most significant surviving Anglo-Saxon building in the county. It is located near the centre of the site of Roman Verulamium to the west of the modern city.

The church stands on the site of the basilica of Roman Verulamium, where, according to tradition, Saint Alban was tried before his execution during the Diocletianic Persecution. On this basis, the parish describes St Michael's as having one of the strongest claims to be the oldest site of known Christian activity in the British Isles. The church's dedication to the archangel Michael, a figure traditionally associated with warfare and conflict, may reflect this connection with the site of Alban's trial.

== History and architecture ==
St Michael's is built on the site of the Roman basilica of Verulamium. According to the 13th-century chronicler Matthew Paris, in AD 948 Abbot Wulsin (or Ulsinus) of St Alban's Abbey founded a church on each of the three main roads into the town of St Albans, namely St Michael's, St Peter's and St Stephen's, to serve pilgrims coming to venerate the Abbey's shrine of Saint Alban. In fact Wulsin may have been Abbot in about 860–880, and the earliest parts of the present building are at least a century later. Nevertheless, the church is certainly from the late Anglo-Saxon era and there may have been an earlier building on the present site.

In the late 10th or early 11th century a stone church was built on a simple plan consisting of a chancel and nave. The building includes much Roman material salvaged from the surrounding ruins of Verulamium, including Roman brick used in the splays of the nave windows. Early in the 12th century a north aisle and then a south aisle were added, linked with the nave by arcades of plain round-headed arches cut in the latter's north and south walls, leaving sections of Saxon wall as piers. The arcades do not match: the earlier north arcade has three bays spaced irregularly; the later south arcade was built with four bays. The round-headed Norman window at the east end of the north aisle may also be 12th-century.

In the 13th century a clerestory with six Early English lancet windows on each side was added to the nave to increase the amount of natural light, much of which had been lost when the aisles were added. Another Early English lancet window from this period survives in the north wall of the chancel. The south aisle proved to be unstable and was underbuilt in an attempt to stabilise it. At a later date, it is not known in which century, the south aisle was demolished.

Slightly later in the 13th century the south chapel was added, and the easternmost arch of the south aisle became the entrance to the chapel. Three of the chapel's windows are round-headed 13th-century late Norman ones: two in the east wall and one in the south wall. The chapel is taller than the nave, so that on the south side of the clerestory the more easterly windows now look into the chapel instead of outside. The 13th century may also be the period when the church was given a west tower.

In about 1340 the chancel and north aisle were rebuilt and the chancel arch was enlarged. The Decorated east window, an ogee-headed south window and matching tomb recess in the chancel, and one of the windows in the north aisle, all date from this time.

In the 15th century three of the single lancets on the north side of the clerestory were replaced with two-light square-headed windows, two large windows were inserted in the south wall of the south chapel and one in the south wall of the chancel. Also 15th century are the piscinas in the chancel and south chapel, and the octagonal font. The 13th-century clerestory was given a new roof on stone corbels late in the 15th century.

Also in the 15th century, a wooden tympanum was inserted in the 14th-century chancel arch and a Doom was painted on it, spreading over the upper part of the east wall of the nave. A rood screen was added to the chancel arch in the same period. It has since been removed, but stone stairs to it survive on the south side of the arch next to the south chapel.

The tower is believed to have been remodelled in the late 15th or early 16th century. In its final form it had paired bell-openings, an embattled parapet and a polygonal stair-turret that was taller than the tower. A late Perpendicular west window of three lights was inserted in the west wall of the nave, probably early in the 16th century.

In 1539 St Alban's Abbey was suppressed in the Dissolution of the Monasteries. The Abbey had the right to hold three fairs in St Albans, one of which was on the Nativity of St John the Baptist on 24 June. After the Dissolution, this fair was discontinued and replaced with one at Michaelmas on 29 September, possibly in reference to St Michael's church. At the same time, the right to appoint the vicar of St Michael's, previously held by the Abbey, passed to the Bacon family of the nearby Gorhambury estate.

St Michael's present wooden pulpit, tester and altar table are late 16th or early 17th century. Early in the 17th century the east wall of the south chapel may have been rebuilt. Between its two lancet windows is a circular one that may date from this time. The present roof of the south chapel may also be 17th century.

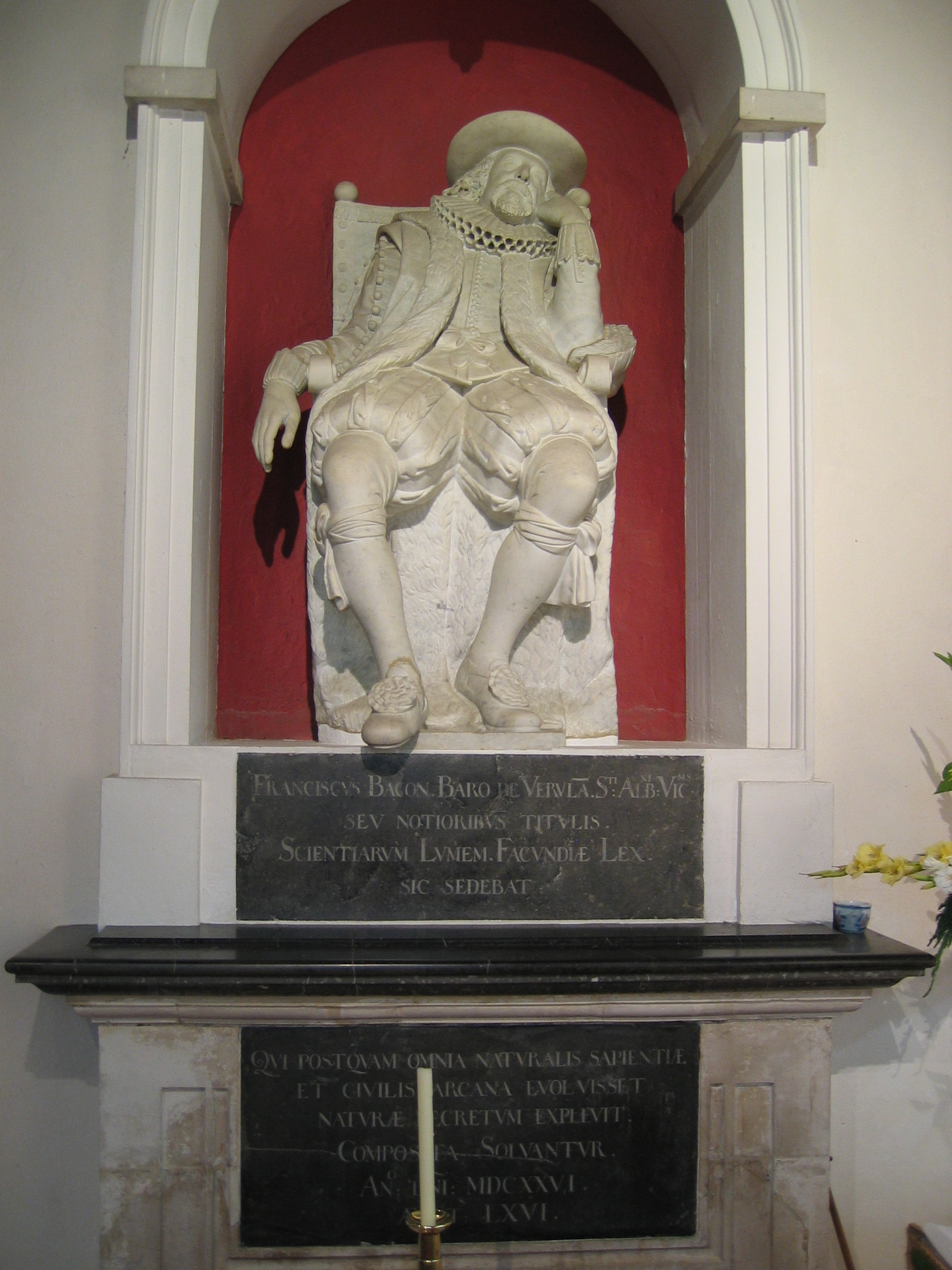
Monument to Francis Bacon (died 1626) in the chancel

St Michael's most significant 17th-century feature is the monument to Francis Bacon, Viscount St Alban, who died in 1626. It is in a round-arched recess inserted for the purpose in the north wall of the chancel. The monument is a life-sized sculpture of Bacon seated in a relaxed pose in an armchair. The name of the sculptor is unknown, but it may have been Nicholas Stone. A copy of this statue, sculpted by Henry Weekes, was commissioned by William Whewell (Master of Trinity College, Cambridge between 1841 and 1866) and erected in the college chapel in 1845 to honour one of the college's most illustrious alumni.

A west gallery was inserted in the nave, apparently late in the 17th century. Box pews were also added: it is not known when, but they were installed in numerous parish churches in the 17th and 18th centuries. In 1866 the church was restored under the direction of George Gilbert Scott. He had the box pews and west gallery removed and added the Gothic Revival south porch, which uses one of the 12th-century arches of the former south aisle.

In 1896 or 1898 Edmund Beckett (1st Baron Grimthorpe) had the west end of the church remodelled to his own designs and at his own expense. He had the west tower demolished, which is how evidence of the old tower's possible 13th-century origins were discovered under its late Perpendicular external fabric. He replaced it with a northwest tower in a "fanciful" Gothic Revival interpretation of Early English Gothic. Beckett had the nave extended slightly westwards, demolishing its old west wall and late Perpendicular west window. He also had a vestry added on the site of the south aisle.

In one of the Victorian-era restorations the 15th-century tympanum was taken down and the rest of the Doom painting was obliterated.

The architect John C. Rogers directed further restoration work in 1934–35 and designed a second vestry that was added on the north side of the chancel in 1938. Rogers also wrote a book, The Parish Church of St. Michael, St. Albans – a Short Illustrated History, which was published in 1965, reprinted in 1973 and revised in 1982.

== Monuments ==
As well as the sculpture of Francis Bacon (see above), St Michael's has some notable monumental brasses. In the south chapel is a 14th-century brass to John Pecock and his wife. There is a brass from 1380 that originally depicted a civilian and his wife with a floriated cross between them. The figure of the wife has been lost and only part of the cross survives. A brass at the east end of the nave shows a knight in armour of about 1400. There is also a brass inscription in memory of Henry Gape (died 1558) and his wife.

== Bells ==
The name of the nearest pub, The Six Bells, is an historical anachronism reflecting the number of bells installed in the 18th century. St Michael's tower now has a ring of eight bells. Samuel Knight, who had foundries at Reading and London, cast the third, fourth, fifth and sixth bells in 1739. John Taylor & Co of Loughborough cast the seventh and tenor bells for Beckett's new northwest tower in 1897, which was also the year of Queen Victoria's Diamond Jubilee. Gillett & Johnston of Croydon cast the treble and second bells in 1953, the year of Elizabeth II's coronation.

== Organ ==
In 1872, Henry Jones built a pipe organ for St Michael's Church.

In 1950, Mander Organs under N. P. Mander built a new organ for St Michael's. In 1981 this was replaced with a new organ built by Peter Collins, though some pipes from the previous organ were retained and revoiced. A pair of oak organ cases from the 1950 organ were retained: they flank Grimthorpe's west window. They bear the inscription "In thanksgiving to Almighty God for the preservation of this church through a thousand years 948 - 1948" on the north case, and "This organ was enlarged and rebuilt in 1950 by the gifts of parishioners and the legacy of Kate Coulter" on the south.

The current organ is in good condition and is used regularly.

Disposition:

Pedal- 30 Notes (South Case)

1. Subbass 16'

2. Octave 8'

3. Wide Octave 4'

4. Fagot 16'

Great- 56 Notes, Tremulant (North Case)

5. Principal 8'

6. Stopt Diapason 8'

7. Octave 4'

8. Quint 2 2/3'

9. Gemshorn 2'

10. Tierce 1 3/5'

11. Mixture 19.22.26.29 (IV)

12. Trumpet 8'

Swell- 56 Notes, Enclosed, Tremulant (North Case)

13. Rohr Flute 8'

14. Viol 8' (Starts at Tenor C)

15. Open Flute 4'

16. Principal 2'

17. Spitz Quint 1 1/3'

18. Schalmey 8'

Couplers- (By Pedals)

Great to Pedal

Swell to Pedal

Swell to Great

Other Details-

Key Action: Tracker

Blower: Electric

Console: Attached, North Case

Keys: Rosewood and Skunktail Sycamore

== Heritage status ==
St Michael's has been a Grade I listed building since 1950. Historic England cites as the principal reasons for the listing: the extensive late Anglo-Saxon fabric, the phases of expansion in the High Middle Ages, the 15th-century nave roof, the tympanum with surviving part of the 15th-century Doom painting, the late Elizabethan or early Jacobean pulpit, and the Jacobean monument to Francis Bacon.

== See also ==
- St Michael, Hertfordshire

== Sources and further reading ==
- Page, W.H., ed. (1908). A History of the County of Hertford, Volume 2. Victoria County History. pp. 469–483.
- Pevsner, Nikolaus; Cherry, Bridget (revision) (1977) [1953]. Hertfordshire. The Buildings of England (2nd ed.). Harmondsworth: Penguin Books. pp. 312–313. ISBN 0-14-071007-8.
- Rogers, John C. (1982) [1965]. The Parish Church of St. Michael, St. Albans — a Short Illustrated History (revised ed.). Oakley Press.
