= St Faith's Church, Hexton =

Church in Hertfordshire, England

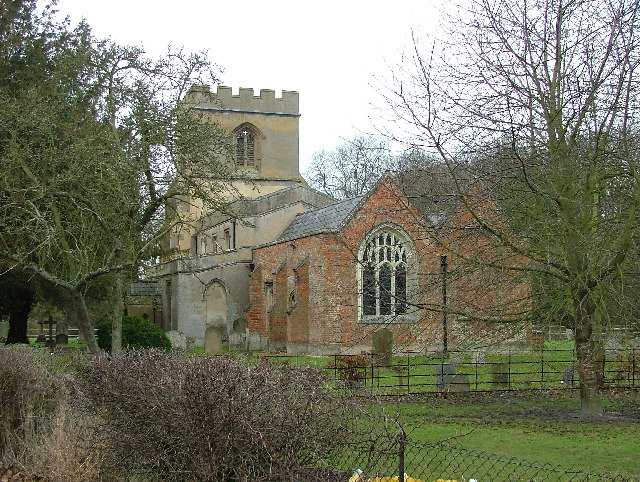
- St Faith's Church, Hexton

- Location in Hertfordshire
- 51.960823°N 0.393150°W
- OS grid reference: TG 10382 30368
- Location: Hexton, Hertfordshire
- Country: England
- Denomination: Church of England
- Website: National Church Trust

History
- Dedication: Saint Faith
- Dedicated: 1114

Architecture
- Heritage designation: Grade II*
- Designated: 27 May 1968
- Architectural type: Church
- Style: Gothic
- Groundbreaking: 1108

Specifications
- Materials: Limestone with later Brick additions

Administration
- Province: Canterbury
- Diocese: St Albans
- Archdeaconry: St Albans
- Deanery: Hitchin

Clergy
- Vicar: Revd Andrew Johnson

Saint Faith's Church, Hexton is the Anglican parish church for the village of Hexton, Hertfordshire. The church is within the parish of Barton-le-Clay in the Diocese of St Albans. The church has been a Grade II* listed building since 1968.

== History ==
The Parish Church of St Faith's, Hexton was originally built in 1108 and dedicated in 1114, it was then rebuilt with the original core in 1254 and dedicated to the French Virgin Martyr Saint Faith. The southern aisle was built before the northern aisle which was added in the 1633 renovation of the church. The existing red brick parts of the church were added later in the 1824 renovation which was carried out by Joseph Andrew de Lautour and his wife Caroline Young. De Lautour was the local landowner of Hexton Manor and descended from the senior line of the Dukes of Bouillon. Throughout the interior of the church there are memorials to the Lautour family. The Tower of St Faith's, Hexton collapsed into a 'decorative ruin' during a particularly hard winter in 1947.

In more recent times the church has been transformed into a community centre since 2003 and has been fitted with many conveniences. However there are still Church of England services every first and third Sunday at 6 p.m. for 45 minutes.

== Gallery ==
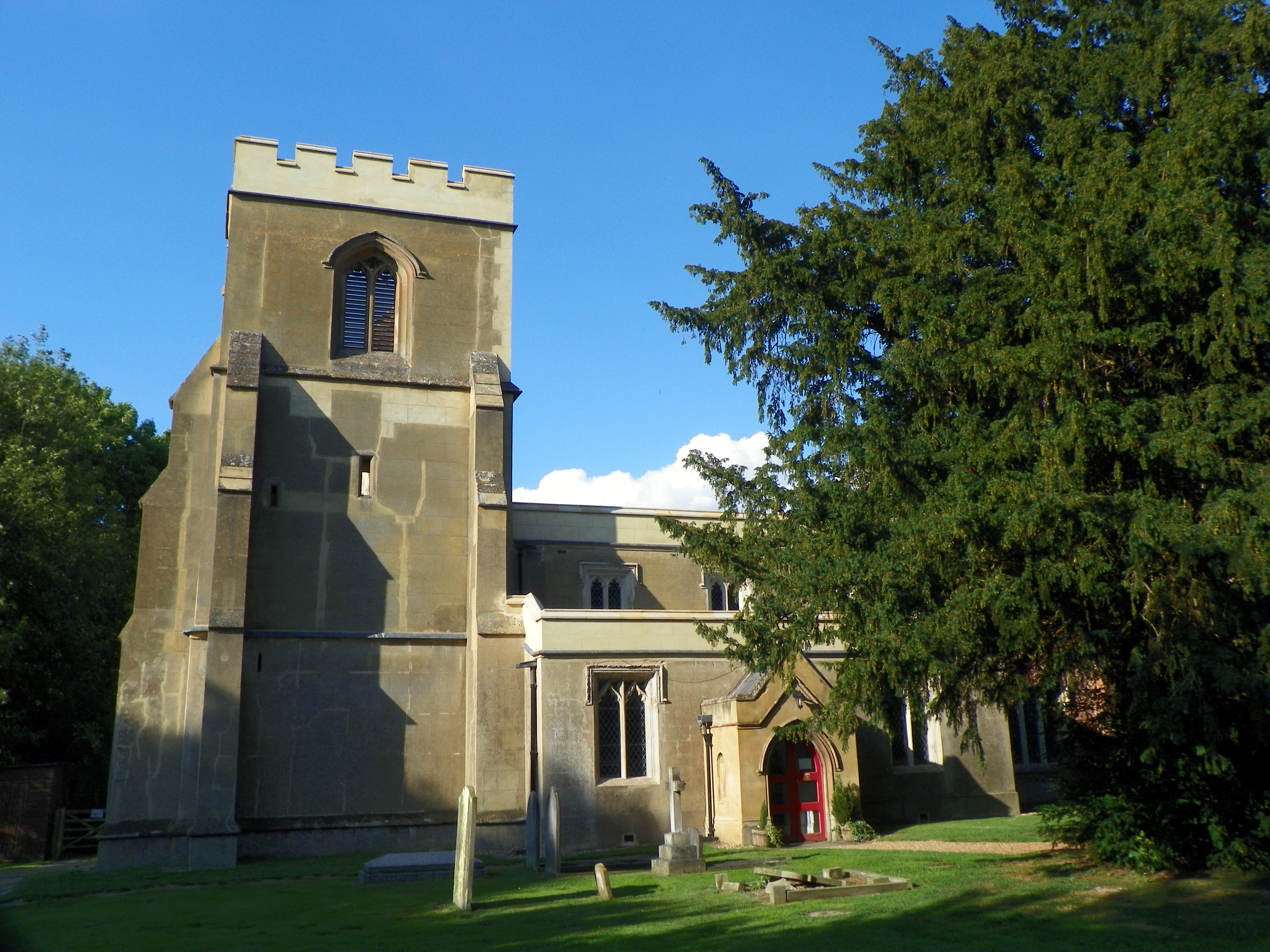
St Faith's East Side

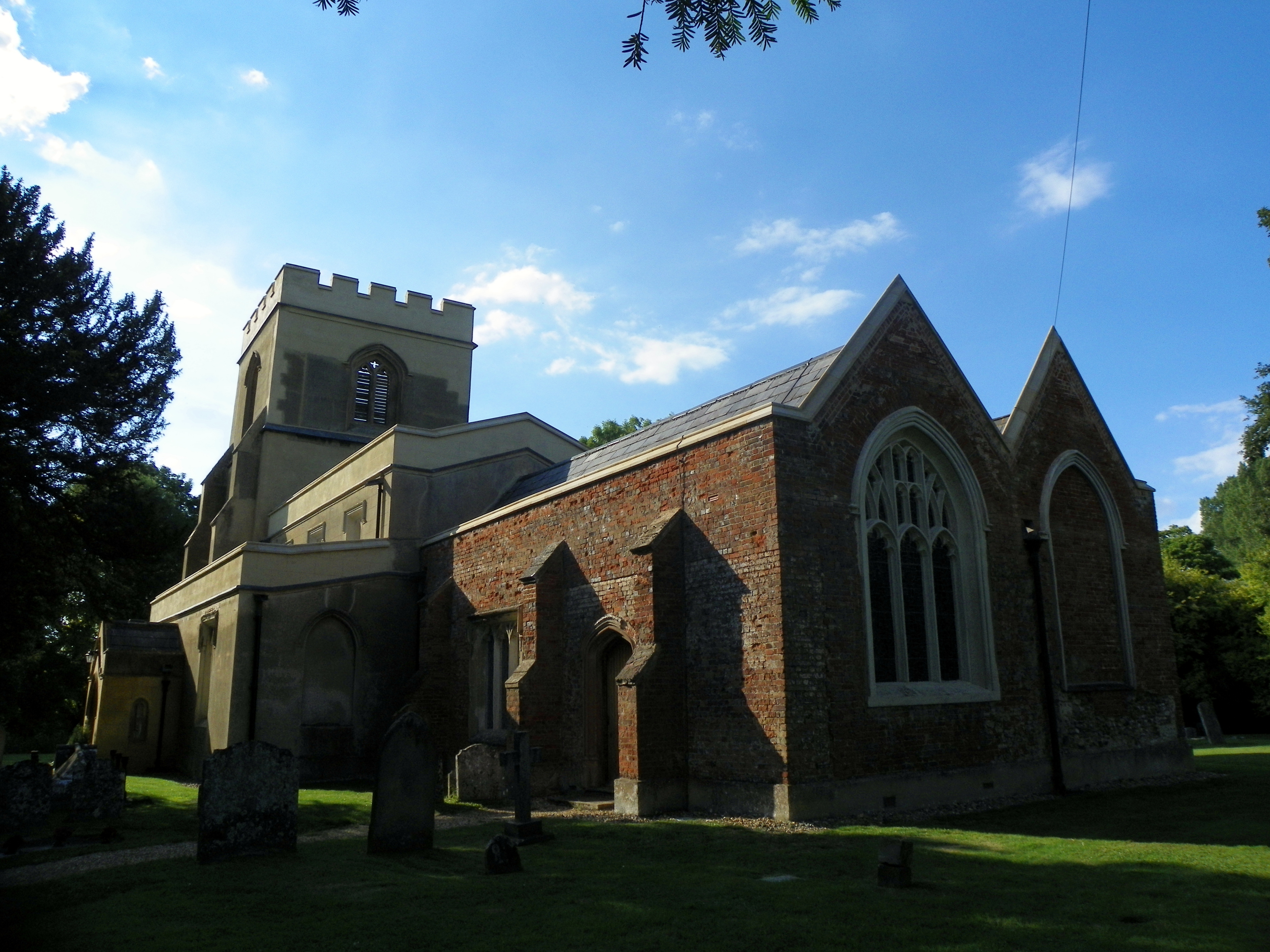
St Faith's North Side

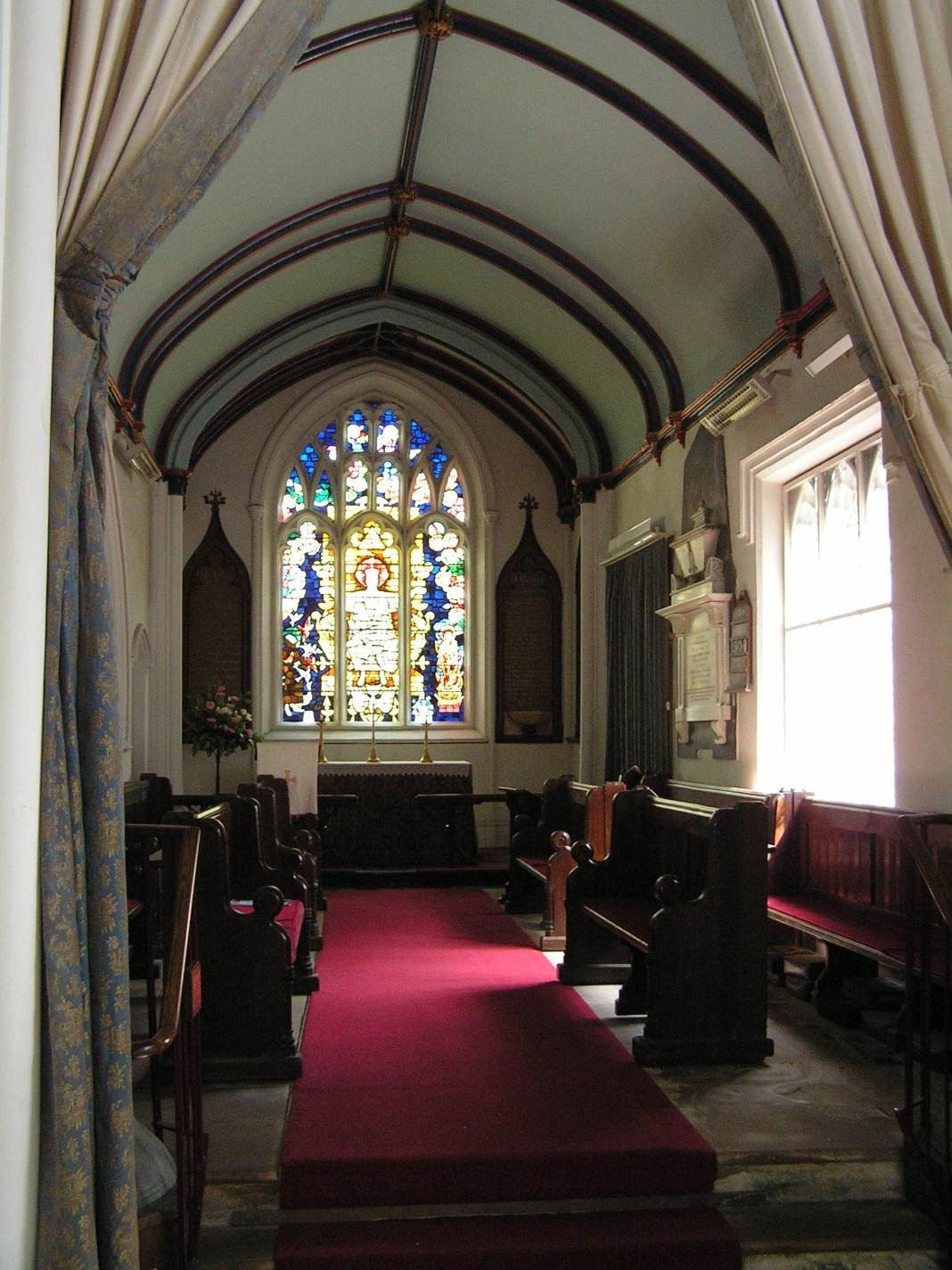
St Faith's Interior

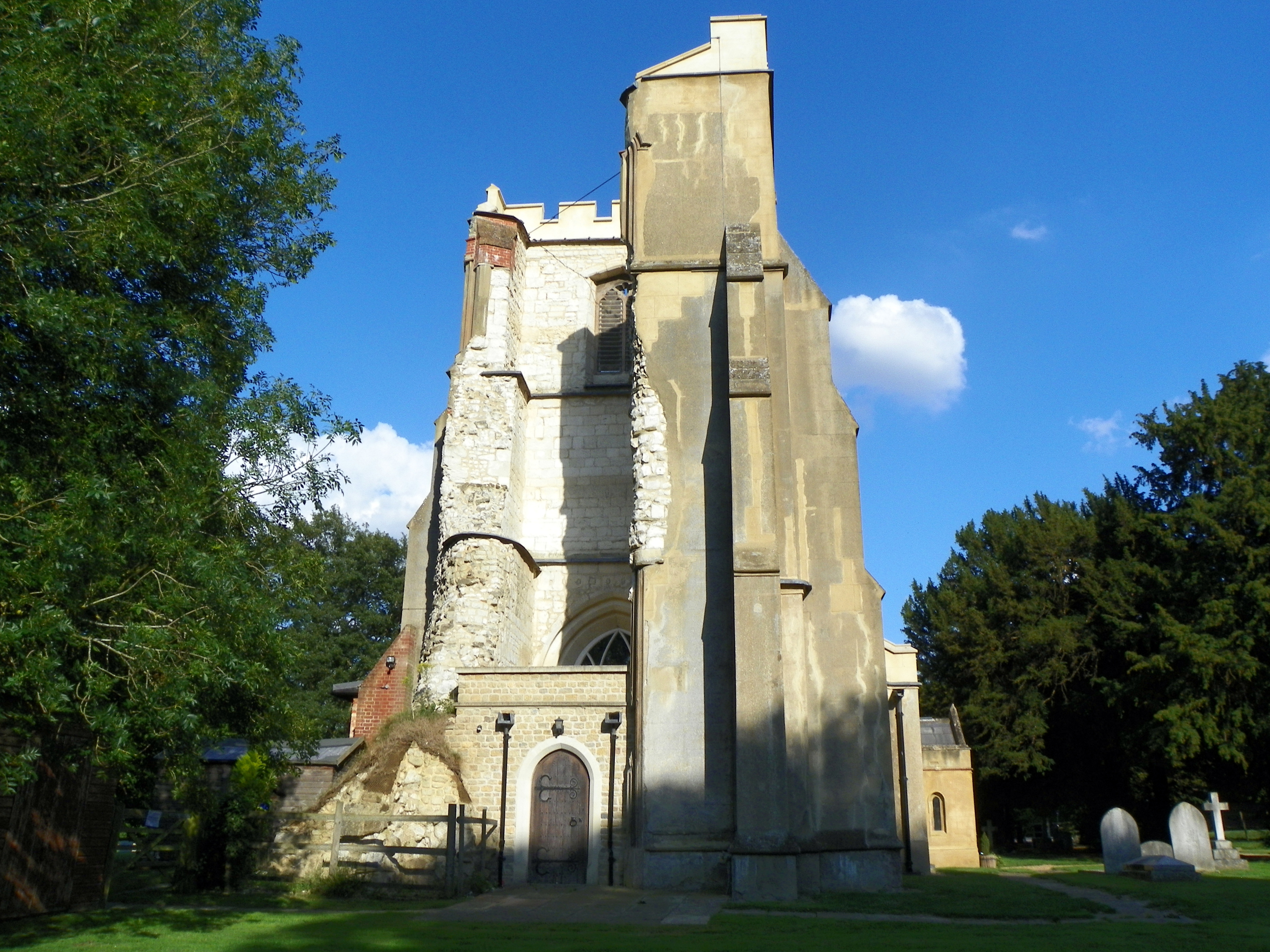
St Faith's Ruined Tower

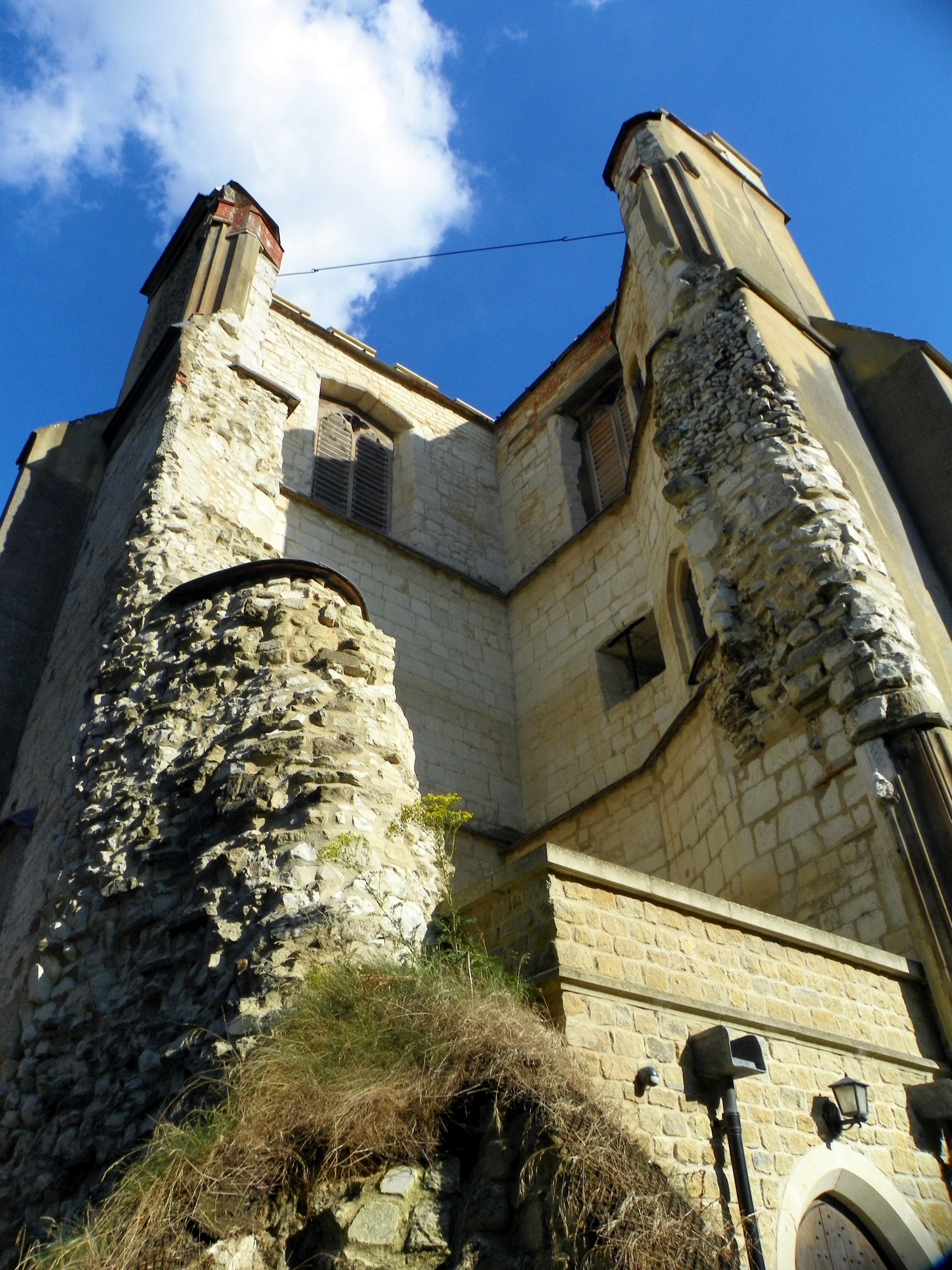
Interior of ruined tower

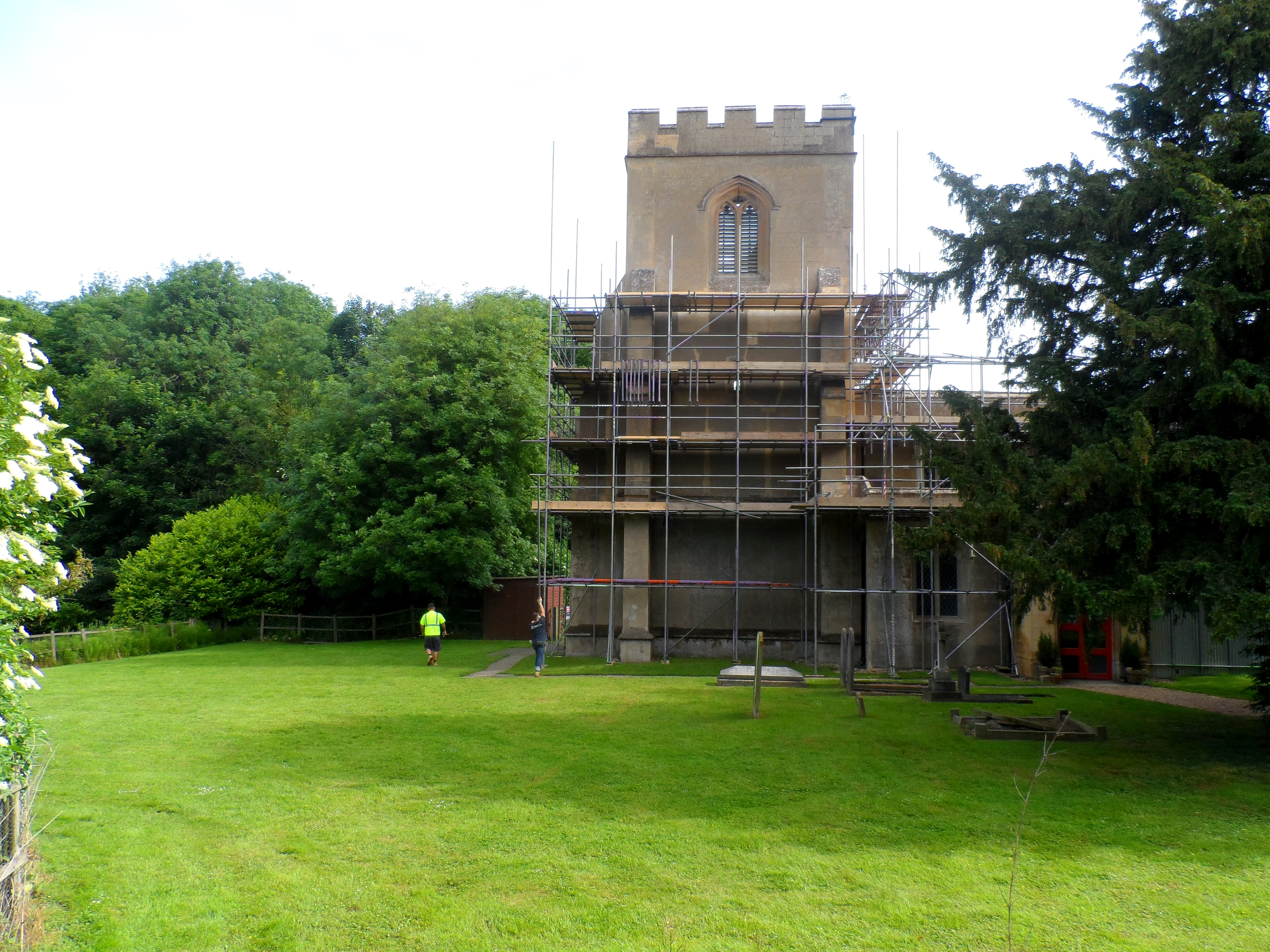
2013 restoration programme
