= High Sheriff of Hertfordshire =

English ceremonial officer

The High Sheriff of Hertfordshire was an ancient Sheriff title originating in the time of the Angles, not long after the foundation of the Kingdom of England, which was in existence for around a thousand years. On 1 April 1974, under the provisions of the Local Government Act 1972, the title of Sheriff of Hertfordshire was retitled High Sheriff of Hertfordshire. The High Shrievalties are the oldest secular titles under the Crown in England and Wales, their purpose being to represent the monarch at a local level, historically in the shires.

The office was a powerful position in earlier times, as sheriffs were responsible for the maintenance of law and order and various other roles. It was only in 1908 under Edward VII that the Lord Lieutenant became more senior than the High Sheriff. Since then the position of High Sheriff has become more ceremonial, with many of its previous responsibilities transferred to High Court judges, magistrates, coroners, local authorities and the police.

Below is a list of Sheriffs and High Sheriffs of Hertfordshire.

== List of Sheriffs of Hertfordshire ==
Prior to 1567 the Sheriff of Essex was also the sheriff of Hertfordshire.

=== Elizabeth I ===
Anno 9 Elizabeth (ie 1566 or 1567): This County was severed from that of Essex, and found Sheriffs by themselves.

Before 1567: see Sheriff of Essex.

- 1567 Sir George Penruddock of Broxbourne, Hertfordshire
- 1568 Rowland Lytton – Knebworth
- 1569 Henry Coningsby – North Mimms
- 1570 William Doddes
- 1571 Edward Baeshe of Stanstead Abbots (1st term)
- 1572 George Horsey of Digswell
- 1573 Thomas Leventhorpe – Shingey Hall
- 1574 Henry Cocke of Broxbourne, Hertfordshire
- 1575 John Gill – Wyddial
- 1576 Thomas Bowles – Wallington
- 1577 Edmond Verney – Pendley
- 1578 Philip Boteler – Watton
- 1579 Charles Moryson – Cassiobury
- 1580 Thomas Docwra of Putteridge Bury
- 1581 Sir John Brocket – Hatfield
- 1582 Henry Coningsby – North Mimms
- 1583 Francis Heydon – The Grove, Watford
- 1584 Edward Baeshe of Stanstead Abbots (2nd term)
- 1585 Henry Capell of Hadham Hall
- 1586 Edward Pulter – Bradfield
- 1587 Thomas Leventhorpe
- 1588 Sir John Cutts
- 1589 Edmond Verney – Pendley
- 1590 Walter Mildmay – Pishiobury
- 1591 Thomas Hanchet
- 1592 Arthur Capel – Hadham Hall
- 1593 John Leventhorpe – Shingey Hall
- 1594 Rowland Lytton of Knebworth House
- 1595 Sir Thomas Sadleir of Standon
- 1596 Ralph Coningsby of North Mimms
- 1597 Richard Spencer of Offley
- 1598 Thomas Pope Blount – Tittenhanger
- 1599 Robert Chester – Royston
- 1600 Thomas Hanchet
- 1601 Thomas Bowles – Wallington
- 1602 Sir Edward Denny – Waltham Abbey

=== James I ===
- 1603 Sir Henry Boteler – Hatfield
- 1604 Sir George Peryent – Digswell
- 1605 Thomas Docwra – Putteridge Bury (son of Thomas, HS 1580)
- 1606 Sir Leonard Hide – Throcking
- 1607 Sir John Leventhorpe – Shingey Hall
- 1608 Nicholas Trott of Quickswood in Clothill
- 1609 Ralph Sadleir – Standon
- 1610 Sir Richard Anderson – Pendley
- 1611 Sir Robert Boteler – Watton
- 1612 John Wild –
- 1613 William Frankland of Rye House
- 1614 Sir Thomas Dacres, snr of Cheshunt (died 1615) then (Aug–Nov) Thomas Dacres jnr of Cheshunt
- 1615 Sir Goddard Pemberton of Hertingfordbury (died August 1616)
- 1616 Lewis Pemberton – St Albans
- 1616 Thomas Newce – Hadham
- 1617 Edward Briscoe – Aldenham
- 1618 Thomas Read – Hatfield
- 1619 Sir Nicholas Hyde, 1st Baronet – North Mimms
- 1620 Roger Pemberton – St Albans
- 1621 William Hale – King's Walden
- 1622 Edward Newport – Pelham
- 1623 Sir Clement Scudamore – North Mimms
- 1624 Richard Sidley – Digswell

=== Charles I ===
- 1625: William Lytton of Knebworth
- 1626: John Jennings
- 1627: Sir Thomas Hyde, 2nd Baronet (son of Nicholas, HS 1620)
- 1628: Edward Gardiner
- 1629: William Hoe
- 1630: John Boteler K.B. of Watton Woodhall, Watton-at-Stone
- 1631:
- 1632: Richard Hale – King's Walden
- 1633: Henry Coghill
- 1634: William Plomer
- 1635: William Priestley
- 1636: William Leman
- 1636: Ralph Freeman
- 1637: Thomas Coningesby
- 1638: Thomas Hewett of Pishiobury, Sawbridgeworth
- 1639: John Gore
- 1640: Richard Cole
- 1641: Arthur Pulter of Broadfield
- 1642: John Garrett
- 1644: Robert Jesselyn
- 1644: Charles Noles
- 1646: Richard Harlakenden of Earls Colne, Essex

=== Commonwealth ===
- 1648 Francis Flyer
- 1648 Rowland Hale
- 1650 John Rowley of Berkway
- 1651 Thomas Keightley of Hertingfordbury Park
- 1652 John Fotherley
- 1654 Humfrey Shatcrosse of Hatfield
- 1654 Sir John Barrington
- 1655 Sir John Reade
- 1658 Sir John Wittewrong, 1st Baronet

=== Charles II ===
- 1662 Rowland Lytton of Knebworth House
- 12 November 1665: Sir Jonathan Keate, 1st Baronet, of the Hoo, Kimpton
- 7 November 1666: Edward Chester
- 6 November 1667: John Ellis
- 6 November 1668: Israel Mayo
- 11 November 1669: Sir Thomas Byde, of Ware Park
- 4 November 1670: Henry Baldwin
- 9 November 1671: Sir John Reade
- 3 December 1671: Samuel Reves
- 11 November 1672: Thomas Priestley
- 12 November 1673: Sir John Reade
- 6 May 1674: Henry Coghill, of Aldenham
- 5 November 1674: Joshua Lomax
- 15 November 1675: Sir John Reade, 1st Baronet
- 9 February 1675: Edward Chester, of Royston
- 9 November 1676: Sir John Reade, 1st Baronet
- 10 November 1676: Sir William Leman, 2nd Baronet of Northaw
- 15 November 1677: Sir John Reade, 1st Baronet
- late 1677: Sir Robert Jocelyn
- 14 November 1678: William Lisson
- 13 November 1679: Thomas Halsey
- 4 November 1680: Sir John Butler
- 1681 Sir Michael Miller
- 1682 James Wilmot
- 1683 Sir Thomas Feild
- 1684 James Gulston
- 1685 Joseph Edmunds
- 1686 Francis Floyer
- 1687 Basil Moor jnr
- 1688 William Hutchinson of Astwell replaced by Richard Hutchinson

=== William and Mary ===
- 1689 Thomas Shatterden – Hatfield
- 1689 John Plumer – Blakesware
- 1690 Sir John Garrard, 3rd Baronet of Lamer
- 1691 George Hadley – East Barnet
- 1692 Sir John Bucknall of Oxhey Place, Watford
- 1693 Sir James Read – Hatfield
- 1694 William Dyer – Newenham

=== William III ===
- 1695 Sir Thomas Rolt – Sacomb
- 1696 John Gape of Harpsfield Hall, St Albans
- 1697 John Billers – Thorley
- 1698 Thomas Auncel – Ickleford
- 1699 Henry Gore – Gilston
- 1700 George Nodes – Shephall
- 1701 Thomas Blackmore

=== Anne ===
- 1702 Robert Hadsley – Munden
- 1703 Edmond Field – Stansted
- 1704 Philip Boteler – Watton
- 1705 Joseph Huntsman
- 1706 Barnard Halpenny
- 1707 Abraham Houblon replaced by Sir Richard Houblon – London
- 1708 Richard Sheppard
- 1709 Henry Houblon – London
- 1710 William Robinson Lytton of Knebworth House then William Berners of Moore Place, Much Hadham
- 1711 Henry Ewer
- 1712 William Smith
- 1713 Charles Felton

=== George I ===
- 1714 Henry Long – Bayford
- 1715 John Duncomb
- 1716 William Bucknall
- 1717 Pulter Forester – Bradfield
- 1718 James Fleet – Tewin
- 1719 John Nichols
- 1720 Sir Charles Buck, 3rd Bt. – Watford
- 1721 Edward Radcliffe – Hitchin
- 1722 Thomas Kentish – St Albans
- 1723 John Seer – Yardley
- 1724 Henry Sibley – Yardley
- Thomas Sibley
- 1725 Samuel Poynter – Kelshall
- 1726 Richard Warren – Tewin

=== George II ===
- 1727 Benedict Ithel – Hitchin
- 1729 Edward Searle replaced by John Turvin of Gilston
- 1730 Francis Goulston – Wyddial
- 1731 Richard Chase
- 1732 Thomas Wooton
- 1733 William Freeman – Aspenden Hall
- 1734 Richard Tuach – Rickmersworth
- 1735 Thomas Rolt – Sacomb
- 1736 John Dean – Wormley
- 1737 Robert Plummer
- 1738 William Gape – St Albans
- 1739 William Benn – West Mill
- 1740 William Shaw – Cheshunt
- 1741 Robert Hadsley – Jenningsbury
- 1742 Geo Carpenter – Redburn
- 1743 Thomas Ansell – Ickleford
- 1744 Richard Chase – Much Hadham
- 1745 Sir Conyers Jocelyn – Hyde Hall
- 1746 Charles Halsey – Great Gaddesden
- 1747 Edward Chester – Albury replaced by Henry Fotherley Whitfield – Rickmersworth
- 1748 William Janssen – Cheshunt
- 1749 Nicholson Calvert – Hunsdon House
- 1750 John Cheshyre – Thundridgebury
- 1751 Thomas Whittewronge – Harpenden
- 1752 Benedict Ithel – Preston
- 1753 Caleb Lomax – Childwickbury
- 1754 Fitzwilliam Barrington – Lilley
- 1755 Giles Thornton Heysham – Paul's Walden
- 1756 John Turvin – Gilston
- 1757 Jacob Houblon – West Mill
- 1758 John Robinson Lytton of Knebworth House
- 1759 Sir John Chapman of Cockenhatch
- 1760 Benjamin Trueman – Hatfield

=== George III ===
- 1761 John Ashfordby – Cheshunt
- 1762 Henry Fotherley Whitfield – Rickmansworth
- 1763 John Cope Freeman – Abbots Langley
- 1764 David Williams – Sarratt
- 1765 Bibye Lake – St Margaret's
- 1766 John Seare – Tring
- 1767: Samuel Whitbread, of Bedwell Park
- 1768 Lionel Lyde, later Sir Lionel Lyde, 1st Baronet – Ayot St Lawrence
- 1769 Jeremiah Hadsley – Barkway
- 1770 Henry Green – Gaddesden Hoo
- 1771 George Prescott – Theobalds
- 1772 Samuel Moody – Watford
- 1773 John Dorrien – Berkhamsted St Peter's
- 1774 Sir Abraham Hume, 2nd Baronet – Wormley Bury
- 1775 Richard Emmott – Goldings
- 1776 Thomas Harwood – Preston
- 1777 John Searancke – Hatfield
- 1778 Thomas Blackmore – Hunsdon
- 1779 Richard Baker – Hertingfordbury
- 1780 John Hunter of Gubbins, Potter's Bar
- 1781 Thomas Clutterbuck – Watford
- 1782 John Mickie – North Mimms
- 1783 Robert Machy – Tewin
- 1784 John Thomas Ellis of Wyddial Hall
- 1785 William Phillimore – Aldenham
- 1786 Jeremiah Milles – Pishiobury
- 1787 John Roper of Berkhamsted st Peter
- 1788 Charles Bourchier of Shenley
- 1789 Drummond Smith of Tring Park
- 1790 Samuel Robert Gaussen of Brookman's Park, North Mimms
- 1791 Matthew Raper of Ashlyns Hall
- 1792 James Bourchier of Shenley
- 1793 Sir George William Prescott, 1st Baronet of Theobalds
- 1794 Samuel Lightenhouse of Orford House
- 1795 James Harding of Tring
- 1796 John Sowerby of Lilley
- 1797 Sir John Sebright, 7th Baronet of Beechwood
- 1798 Felix Calvert – Hunsdon House
- 1799 Archibald Paxton – Watford Place
- 5 February 1800: Justinian Casamajor, of Potterells
- 11 February 1801: Thomas Fitzherbert, of Shenley
- 3 February 1802: Jacob Bosanquet, of Broxbourne Park
- 3 February 1803: Henry Brown, of North Mimms Place
- 1 February 1804: Edward Garrow, of Totteridge
- 6 February 1805: Emilius Henry Delmé-Radcliffe, of Hitchin Priory
- 1 February 1806: George Sullivan Marten, of Sandridge Lodge
- 4 February 1807: George Caswall, of Sacombe Park
- 3 February 1808: James Smyth, of Ashlyns Hall
- 6 February 1809: Edmond Darby, of Aston Bury
- 31 January 1810: Thomas Haworth, of Boreham Lodge
- 8 February 1811: Robert Taylor, of Tolmers
- 24 January 1812: John Currie, of Essendon
- 10 February 1813: John Fam Timins, of Aldenham
- 4 February 1814: Nicholas Segar Parry, of Little Hadham
- 13 February 1815: Andrew Reid, of Chipping Barnet
- 1816 Daniel Giles of Youngsbury, Ware
- 1817 Edmund Morris of Chorleywood
- 1818 George Palmer – Much Hadham
- 1819 Samuel Unwin Heathcote – Shephallbury

=== George IV ===
- 1820 John Earley Cook – Nunsbury
- 1821 Joseph Timperon – New Barnet
- 1822 Thomas Daniell – Little Berkhampstead
- 1823 Robert Sutton – Rossway, Northchurch
- 1824 Patrick Haydon – Colney Chapel
- 1825 Thomas Nash Kemble – Gubbins Park
- 1826 Sir George Duckett – Roydon
- 1827 Joseph Andrew Latour – Hexton Manor
- 1828 Sir Culling Smith – Bedwell Park
- 1829 Charles Phelips – Briggins Park

=== William IV ===
- 1830 William Hale – King's Walden
- 1831 Augustus Smith – Ashlyns Hall first appointed, replaced by Thomas Robert Dimsdale, Baron Dimsdale – Camfield Place
- 1832 Robert Plumer Ward – Gilston Park
- 1833 George Jacob Bosanquet – Broxbourne Bury
- 1834 Wiliam Robert Phillimore – Newberries
- 1835 William Robert Baker – Bayfordbury
- 1836 William Blake – Danesbury

=== Victoria ===
- 1837 George Proctor – Bennington
- 1838 Claude George Thornton – Tewin
- 1839 Charles Benet Drake Gerard – Lamer Park
- 1840 Charles Snell Chauncy – Little Munden
- 1841 Robert William Gaussen – Brookmans
- 1842 George Gould Morgan of Brickendonbury
- 1843 Charles John Dimsdale – Essendon Place
- 1844 Frederick Cass – Little Grove
- 1845 Sir Henry Meux, 2nd Baronet – Theobalds Park
- 1846 Felix Calvert – Hunsdon House
- 1847 Humphrey Harper Burchell – Bushey Grange
- 1848 William Parker – Ware Park
- 1849 Abel Smith – Woodhall Park
- 1850 Fulke Southwell Greville – North Mimms Park
- 1851 William John Lysley – Mymms
- 1852 Wynn Ellis – Ponsbourne Park
- 1853 Sir Thomas Gage Sebright – Beechwood Park
- 1854 Robert Hanbury – Poles
- 1855 Nathaniel Hibbert – Munden
- 1856 William Joseph Myers – Porters
- 1857 William Reid – Codicote
- 1858 William Wilshere – Welwyn
- 1859 Martin Hadsley Gosselin – Ware
- 1860 James Bentley – Cheshunt
- 1861 William Jones Loyd – Langleybury
- 1862 John Hodgson – Gilston Park
- 1863 Samuel Richard Block – Barnet
- 1864 Sir Astley Paston Cooper – Gadesbridge
- 1865 Forster Alleyne McGeachy – Shenley Hill
- 1866 Henry Heyman Toulmin – Childwickbury
- 1867 Charles Booth – Stanstead Abbotts
- 1868 Robert Pryor – Watford
- 1869 Robert Smith – Goldings
- 1870 Unwin Unwin Heathcote – Shephallbury
- 1871 Charles Longman – Shendish
- 1872 Thomas Curtis – Great Berkhampstead
- 1873 HJ Smith – Bosanquet – Broxbournebury
- 1874 Sir John Gage Sebright – Beechwood
- 1875 James Sydney Walker – Hunsdonbury
- 1876 John Gwyn Jeffreys – Ware Priory
- 1877 David Carnegie – Watford
- 1878 Thomas Fowell Buxton – Ware
- 1879 Charles Butler – Hatfield
- 1880 Charles Cholmondely Hale – King's Walden
- 1881 John Evans – Hemel Hempstead
- 1882 James William Carlile – Hertford
- 1883 Salisbury Baxendale – Ware
- 1884 Henry Hucks Gibbs – Watford
- 1885 Sir Astley Paston-Cooper – Gadebridge
- 1886 John Harry Eyres Parker – Ware Park
- 1887 Henry Wilson Demain-Saunders – Hertford
- 1888 William Bunce Greenfield – Flamsteadbury
- 1889 Joseph Grout Williams – Pendley Manor
- 1890 Arthur Henry Holland-Hibbert – Munden
- 1891 Edmund Smith Hanbury – Poles, Ware
- 1892 Richard Benyon Croft – Ware
- 1893 Robert Barclay – Hoddesdon
- 1894 Edward Henry Loyd – Langleybury
- 1895 Edward Salvin Bowlby – Gilston Park
- 1896 Percival Bosanquet – Ponfield
- 1897 John Henry Buxton – Hunsdon Bury
- 1898 Charles Thomas Part – St Albans
- 1899 Frederick Henry Norman – Much Hadham
- 1900 Sir George Faudel Faudel-Phillips – Balls Park, Hertford

=== Edward VII ===
- 1901 Major-General Apsley Cherry-Garrard, of Lamer Park – Wheathampstead
- 1902 Evelyn Simpson – Baldock
- 1903 Henry Tylston Hodgson – Harpenden
- 1904 Sir Edgar Reginald Sebright – Beechwood
- 1905 Thomas Fenwick Harrison – King's Walden Bury
- 1906 Hellier Gosselin-Grimshawe – Bengeo Hall
- 1907 Benjamin Samuel Faudel-Phillips – Hertford
- 1908 Arthur Salvin Bowlby – Gilston Park
- 1909 Edward Ernest Pearson – Brickendonbury
- 1910 Sir Alfred Reynolds – Ayot Bury

=== George V ===
- 1911 Major Richard Page Croft – Ware
- 1912 Maurice George Carr Glyn – Hadham
- 1913 Herbert Gibbs, 1st Baron Hunsdon of Hunsdon – Briggens, Nr Ware
- 1914 Lewis Evans – Watford
- 1915 Henry William Clinton Baker – Bayfordbury
- 1916 Walter Reynolds – St Albans
- 1917 Charles Robert Southwell, Baron Dimsdale – Meesden
- 1918 Capt Hubert Laurie Bullen – Hatfield
- 1919 Major-Gen Sir Charles Haddon – Great Berkhamsted
- 1920 John Ramsay Drake – St Albans
- 1921 Sir Arthur Cory-Wright – Welwyn
- 1922 Col Sir Edward Hildred Carlile – Hertford
- 1923 Capt George Strachan Pawle – Widford
- 1924 BrigGen Sir Brodie Henderson – Little Berkhamsted
- 1925 Sir Charles Alexander Nall-Cain – Hatfield
- 1926 Sir Frederick William Lewis – Essendon
- 1927 Lt Col Osmond McMullen – Ware
- 1928 George Richard Smith-Bosanquet – Broxbourne
- 1929 Capt Everard Martin-Smith – Codicote
- 1930 Charles Morland Agnew – Croxley Green
- 1931 Sir Walter Lawrence – Sawbridgeworth
- 1932 Major John Fenwick Harrison – King's Waldenbury
- 1933 Sir Lionel Faudel-Philips – Hertford
- 1934 Capt Robert Humphrey Haslam – Berkhamsted

=== George V and Edward VIII ===
- 1935 Lt Colonel Wilfred Hubert Wild – St Albans

=== Edward VIII and George VI ===
- 1936 Col Sir Geoffrey Selby Church – Hatfield

=== George VI ===
- 1937 Arthur Edwin Cutforth – Sawbridgeworth
- 1938 Henry Fowell Buxton – Ware
- 1939 Capt Sir Cecil Gustavus Newman – Royston
- 1940 Capt Reginald Henry Abel-Smith – Hatfield
- 1941 Major Albert Pam – Broxbourne
- 1942 Sir Felix Cassel – Luton
- 1943 Col William Hilton Briggs – Watford
- 1944 Michael Bruce Urquhart Dewar – Hitchin
- 1945 Capt Sir Humphrey Edmund de Trafford – Royston
- 1946 Sir Patrick Ashley Cooper – Hexton Manor
- 1947 Capt Francis Pawle – Ware
- 1948 Brig Edward Henry Beddington – Much Hadham
- 1949 Brig Walter Hugh Crosland – Little Berkhamsted
- 1950 David Bowes-Lyon – St Paul's Walden Bury
- 1951 Col Sir William Henry Dyke Acland – Welwyn

=== Elizabeth II ===
- 1952 Charles Maynard – Potters Bar
- 1953 Thomas Abel Smith – Hertford
- 1954 Col John Maitland – Welwyn
- 1955 Lt Col Robert McMullen – Buntingford
- 1956 Sir William Cooper – Berkhamsted
- 1957 Charles Wentworth-Stanley – Sawbridgeworth
- 1958 John Buxton – Wareside
- 1959 Lt Col Francis Fremantle – Hertford
- 1960 Brigadier Richard Hanbury – Braughing
- 1961 Maj Adrian Hadden-Paton – Berkhamsted
- 1962 Arthur Proctor – Harlow
- 1963 Douglas Cory-Wright – Harpenden
- 1964 Leopold Seymour – Hadham
- 1965 Lucius Thompson-McCausland – Hertford
- 1966 Sir Aubrey Burke – Bovingdon
- 1967 Ronald Pilkington – Stanstead Abbotts
- 1968 James Ashley Cooper – Hexton Manor
- 1969 Julian Martin Smith – Berkhamsted
- 1970 Sir Frederick Seebohm – Chapmore End
- 1971 Lt Col James Thompson – Stevenage
- 1972 David Wentworth-Stanley – Munden
- 1973 Charles Wentworth-Stanley – Sawbridgeworth

== Arms ==
Coat of arms of High Sheriff of Hertfordshire

Notes
Granted 20 August 1963
Escutcheon
Azure a castle triple towered Or on a chief Argent a hart lodged Proper.

== List of High Sheriffs of Hertfordshire ==
=== Elizabeth II ===
- 1974 Maj Thomas Edward Baron Dimsdale of Barkway
- 1975 Sir Simon Bowes-Lyon of St Paul's Walden
- 1976 Peter Compton Hamilton-Spencer-Smith of Hitchin
- 1977 Captain Eric Charles Marsden of Great Gaddesden
- 1978 Martin Acland of High Cross
- 1979 Edmund Leigh Grundy of Royston
- 1980 Michael Meredith Hardy of Baldock
- 1981 Sir Gerard Sigismund Newman of Royston
- 1982 John Christopher McMullen of Westmill, Buntingford
- 1983 Lady Stuart-Smith (Joan) of Abbots Langley
- 1984 Ralph Abel Smith of Woodhall Park
- 1985 Gerald Chastel de Boinville of Walkern
- 1986 Antony Woodall of Great Hormead
- 1987 Harry Bott of Benington
- 1988 John Lockhart Wood of Great Gaddesden
- 1989 Susan Blount of Barkway
- 1990 Captain Charles Barclay of Brent Pelham
- 1991 Richard Edmonds of Micklefield Hall
- 1992 Henry Buxton of Wareside
- 1993 Ted Harvey of Bishops Stortford
- 1994 Lady Staughton (Joanna) of Sarratt
- 1995 Nicholas Halsey of Great Gaddesden
- 1996 Robert Edward Dimsdale of Barkway
- 1997 (Hugh) Richard Walduck of Hatfield
- 1998 Richard Oakley Pleydell-Bouverie of Peter's Green
- 1999 Harry Morton Neal of Sarratt
- 2000 Revd Teddy Faure Walker of Sandon
- 2001 Christopher Maurice Laing of Ayot St Lawrence
- 2002 Dione Grimston, Countess of Verulam of St Albans
- 2003 Lady Lyell (Susanna) of Markyate
- 2004 Lady Nichols (Shelagh) of Bucks Hill
- 2005 David McMullen of Westmill
- 2006 William Tudor John of Willian
- 2007 Howard Guard of Radlett
- 2008 Paul David Cherry of Weston
- 2009 Jane Wentworth-Stanley of Great Munden
- 2010 Gerald Michael Nolan Corbett of Redbourn
- 2011 Lord Charles Cecil of Hatfield
- 2012 Arabella Clare Stuart-Smith of Bedmond, Abbots Langley
- 2013 Viscountess Trenchard, Standon, Ware
- 2014 Fergus J McMullen of The Old Vicarage, Berden, Bishop's Stortford
- 2015 Jonathan Charles Gosselin Trower of Stanstead Bury, Stanstead Abbotts, Ware
- 2016 Stelio Haralambos Stefanou of Tewin
- 2017 William Arthur Hobhouse of Sarratt
- 2018 Suzana Rose Harvey of Wickham Hall, Bishop's Stortford
- 2019 Sarah Margaret Beazley of Buntingford
- 2020 Henry Thurstan Holland-Hibbert of Watford
- 2021 Lionel C. Wallace of St Albans
- 2022 Sally Denise Burton

=== Charles III ===
- 2023: Margaret Elizabeth Green
- 2024: Anne Patricia Brewster, Gustard Wood
- 2025: Nicholas Fowell Buxton, Ware
- 2026: Anna Louise Rankin, Rickmansworth

== Website ==
High Sheriff of Hertfordshire
