= Honorary degree =

Academic qualification awarded without usual requirements

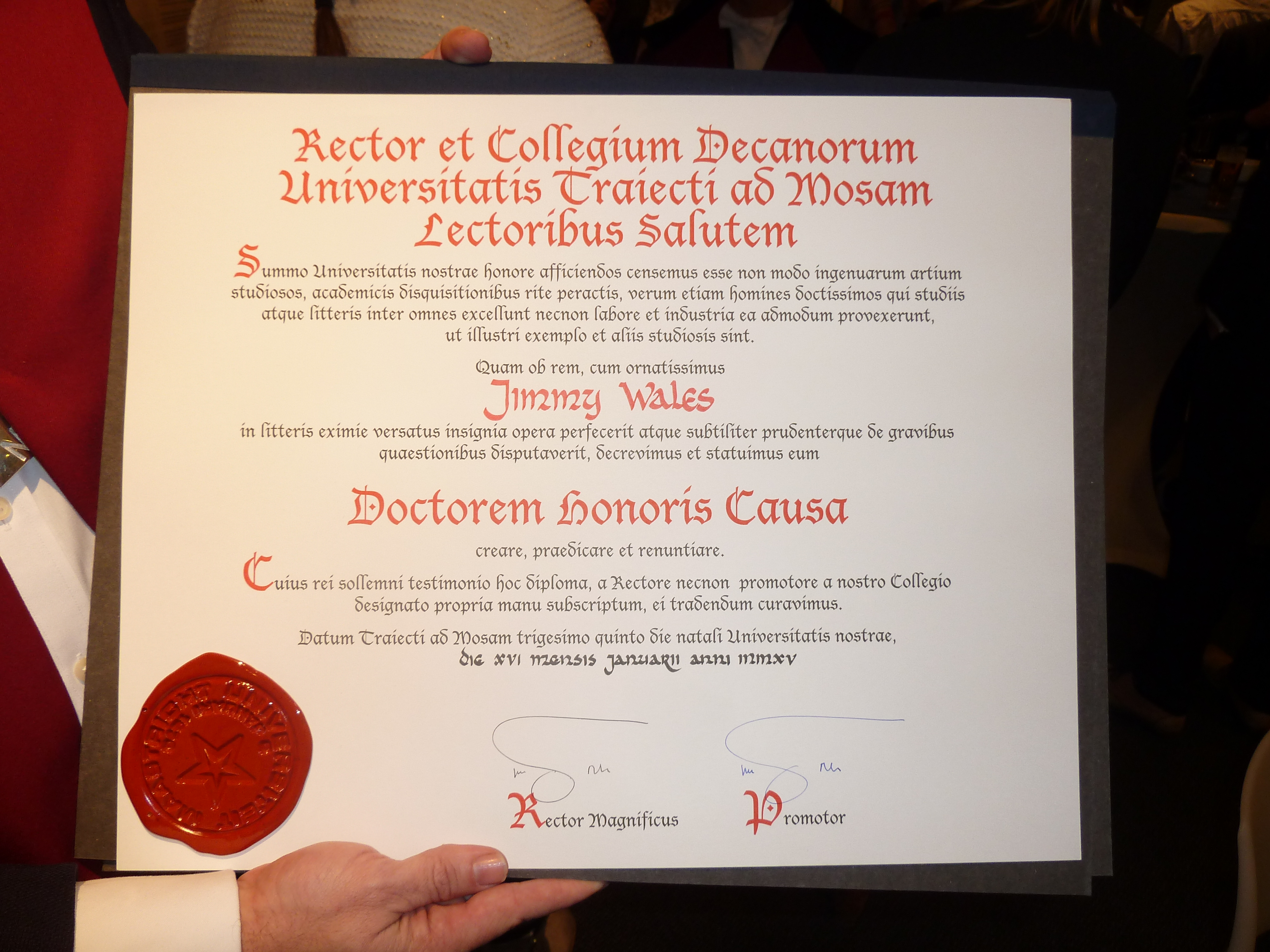
The honoris causa doctorate received by Jimmy Wales from the University of Maastricht in the Netherlands (2015)

An honorary degree or degree honoris causa ("for the sake of the honour") is an academic degree, typically a doctorate, conferred without examination to recognise the honoree's achievements and contributions to society. These are normally titular degrees, with fewer rights than substantive degrees. It may, more broadly, be any degree awarded without examination in order to recognise a person's achievements or their status in a university.

== History ==
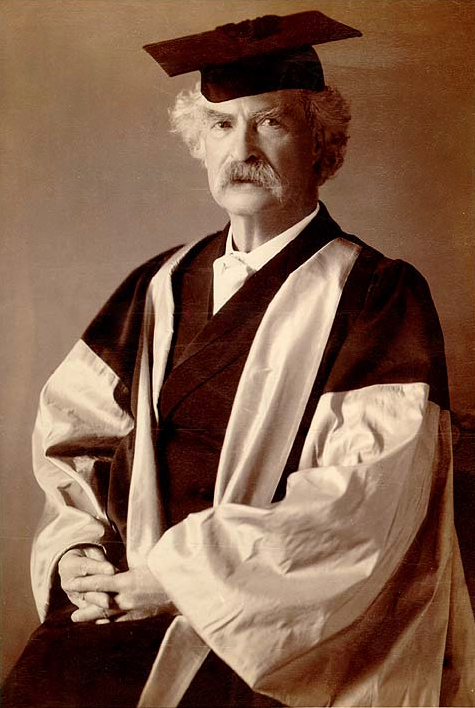
Mark Twain in the academic dress of his honorary DLitt Oxon

The forerunner of the modern honorary degree was the degree by creation, referring to a degree "conferred ... without passing through a University course (or after passing through only a partial course) and without performing the exercises". Two of the earliest on record, in the late 15th century, were awarded by the University of Oxford to Lionel Woodville (chancellor of the university 1479–1483 and Bishop of Salisbury 1482–1484) and Thomas Bourchier (Archbishop of Canterbury 1454–1486). The University of Cambridge similarly honoured John Skelton in 1493.

In the late 16th century, the granting of degrees by creation at Oxford became quite common, especially on the occasion of royal visits. On the visit of James I to Oxford in 1605, for example, forty-three members of his retinue (fifteen of whom were earls or barons) received the degree of Master of Arts, and the Register of Convocation explicitly states that these were full degrees, carrying the usual privileges, such as voting rights in convocation and congregation.

The modern titular honorary degree grew out of the degree by creation towards the end of the 17th century, with the first degree explicitly designated honoris causa at Oxford being the honorary MA awarded to Sir Henry Hoo Keate in 1717.

The DD conferred upon Increase Mather by Harvard University in 1692 is sometimes cited as the first honorary degree awarded in America. However, the citation for the degree shows that it was a substantive degree awarded on the basis of his published works. Benjamin Franklin's honorary MA in 1753 is considered Harvard's first true honorary degree. Before this, Yale University had conferred an honorary MD on Daniel Turner in 1723 in thanks for a donation of books to the college library; it was said by critics that the MD stood for multum donavit ("he gave much").

While other European universities followed Oxford and Cambridge in granting substantive degrees as honours by offering dispensations from examination requirements, the modern titular honorary degree with limited rights was only adopted by most European universities from the early 19th century. In France, the Imperial University was barred from awarding honorary degrees and French universities were only granted this right in 1918.

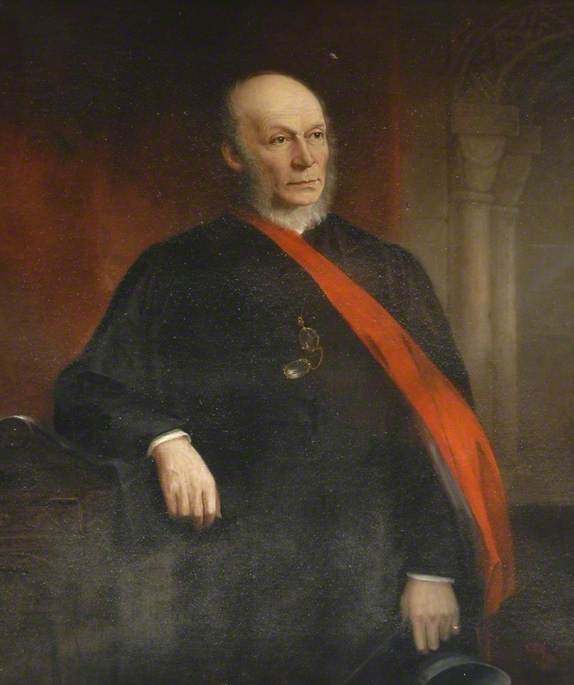
John Cundill, the first graduate of Durham University, wearing the hood of the honorary DD conferred at the university's jubilee.

In the 1870s and 1880s, the celebration of university jubilees became popular across Europe, with large numbers of honorary degrees being awarded at these festivals. These included 40 honorary degrees at the jubilee of Durham University in 1882, and 140 at the tercentenary of the University of Edinburgh in 1884. This spread to the US, with 42 honorary degrees at Harvard's sestercentennial in 1886, 61 at Columbia University's centennial of its refoundation in 1887, and 79 at Princeton University's sesquicentennial in 1896. The practice continued in the 20th century, with Yale awarding 60 honorary degrees at its bicentenary in 1901, Columbia giving 43 at the 150th anniversary of its original foundation in 1904 and 134 at the 175th anniversary in 1929, and Harvard awarding 86 at its tercentenary in 1936.

From the 16th century until 1882, degrees were only awarded without examination at Cambridge by royal mandate (referred to as mandate degrees), after which "full honorary degrees" (official degrees and dignity degrees) were awarded without examination to people appointed to university teaching posts and on Cambridge graduates that became bishops, and titular degrees on other honorees.

In the United States, the Doctor of Philosophy (PhD) degree was first conferred as an honorary degree at Bucknell University in 1852, almost a decade before the first earned PhD in the US was awarded by Yale in 1861. Over one hundred institutions in the United States conferred honorary PhD degrees in the 19th century, to more than seven hundred recipients. However, the practice of awarding the PhD as an honorary degree drew condemnation from organizations such as the American Philological Association and the American Association for the Advancement of Science, and the board of regents of the University of the State of New York prohibited any university in the state from conferring an honorary PhD effective in 1897. The number of honorary PhD degrees awarded in the US declined in the 20th century, and surveys by the United States Office of Education found none conferred in 1940 or later years. One of the last known recipients of an honorary PhD was singer Bing Crosby, from Gonzaga University in 1937.

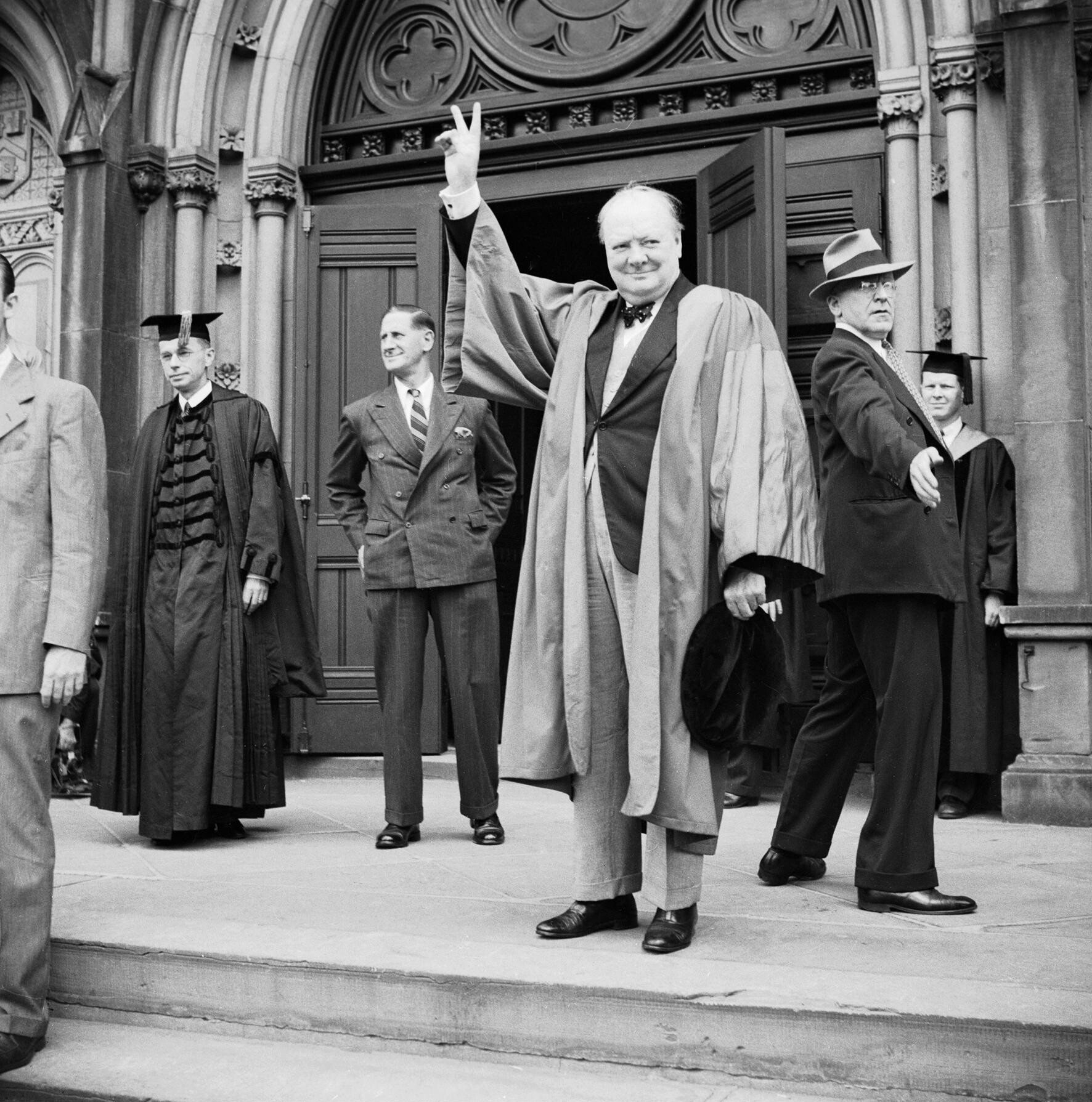
Winston Churchill, wearing the robes of his honorary DCL Oxon to receive an honorary LLD from Harvard.

In the run up to and during World War Two, Oxford honorary degrees were used as diplomatic weapons. Lord Halifax, Oxford's chancellor from 1933, also served as minister of war from 1935 to 1938, as foreign secretary from 1938 to 1940, and as British ambassador to the US from 1940 to 1946. Delegations of senior academics travelled from Britain to ceremonies held overseas, or the university was represented by British diplomats. The award of an honorary degree to Antonio de Oliveira Salazar, the Portuguese prime minister, was described by a Foreign Office official as "first-class propaganda for our cause". Following Oxford's award of an honorary degree to Franklin D. Roosevelt in 1941, Harvard awarded an honorary LLD to Winston Churchill in 1943 at a specially arranged September ceremony while Churchill was in North America for the First Quebec Conference.

By 2001, about 21 US states had begun allowing public schools to grant honorary high school diplomas to military veterans under a program called "Operation Recognition". In Ohio, it was unclear whether public schools had the legal authority to grant them until 12 July 2001, when Governor Bob Taft signed a bill allowing public school districts to grant them to honorably discharged veterans of World War II. Lakota East High School is believed to have awarded the first such diplomas to a group of 20 veterans in May of that year.

== Modern practice ==
The modern honorary degree has been defined as "an academic degree conferred by a university institution, at its own initiative, without cost to the recipient, to honour someone renowned for his or her merits in the field of science, culture, politics, economics, religion or defence, without examinations or dissertations, but also without any rights connected to the degree". (Note: Dufour, Alfred. "Les honneurs de la science: Réflexions sur le sens, l'origine et l'histoire de l'institution du doctorat honoris causa". In K. Kroeschell (ed.). Gerichtslauben-Vorträge. Freiburger Festkolloquium zum fünfundsiebzigsten Geburtstag von Hans Thieme. Sigmaringen: Jan Thorbecke Verlag. p. 109. Translated and cited in Dhondt 2011)

Honorary degrees are usually awarded at regular graduation ceremonies, although some universities, such as Oxford and Cambridge, award honorary degrees at separate ceremonies. Recipients may be invited to give an address – which can vary from a short acceptance speech to a full commencement address. Many US institutions will also pay commencement speakers, particularly celebrities, in addition to granting them an honorary degree. Generally, universities nominate several persons each year for honorary degrees; these nominations usually go through several committees before receiving approval. Nominees are generally not told until a formal approval and invitation are made; often it is perceived that the system is shrouded in secrecy, and occasionally seen as political and controversial. On occasion, organisations have been awarded honorary doctorates.

Some universities and learned societies award honorary fellowships in a similar manner to honorary degrees.

=== Degrees awarded ===
Although higher doctorates such as Doctor of Science, Doctor of Letters, etc. are often awarded honoris causa, in some countries (such as the UK, Ireland, Australia, and New Zealand) it is also possible to earn these as a substantive degrees. This typically involves the submission of a portfolio of peer-reviewed research, usually undertaken over a number of years, which has made a substantial contribution to the academic field in question. The university will appoint a panel of examiners who will consider the case and prepare a report recommending whether or not the degree be awarded. Usually, the applicant must have some strong formal connection with the university in question, for example full-time academic staff, or graduates of several years' standing.

Some universities, seeking to differentiate between substantive and honorary doctorates, have a degree (often DUniv, or Doctor of the University) which is used for these purposes, with the other higher doctorates reserved for formally examined academic scholarship.

=== Posthumous awards ===
In April 2023, the President of Yale, Peter Salovey, awarded MA Privatim degrees posthumously to Reverend James W. C. Pennington and Reverend Alexander Crummell, the first two black students at Yale, both of whom faced numerous incidents of discrimination and left Yale without earning degrees.

=== Institutions that do not award honorary degrees ===
Some US universities, such as the Massachusetts Institute of Technology (MIT), Cornell University, Stanford University and Rice University, do not award honorary degrees as a matter of policy. The University of Virginia (founded in 1819) was probably the first US university to have an explicit policy of not awarding honorary degrees, at the request of its founder, Thomas Jefferson. In 1845, William Barton Rogers, then chairman of the faculty, vigorously defended this policy; in 1861, he founded MIT in Boston and continued this practice. The University of Virginia does annually award Thomas Jefferson Medals in architecture and in law, as the highest honours accorded by that institution. Cornell did not award honorary degrees under founding president Andrew Dickson White, who thought them "pretended honors" that "tend[ed] to lower respect for many American colleges and universities". However, honorary degrees were briefly awarded under his successor, Charles Kendall Adams in 1886, with White and Cornell alum David Starr Jordan, the president of Indiana University and later the founding president of Stanford, receiving honorary LLDs. Alumni and faculty petitions against honorary degrees led to the ban on honorary degrees being reinstated later that year.

=== Controversial use ===
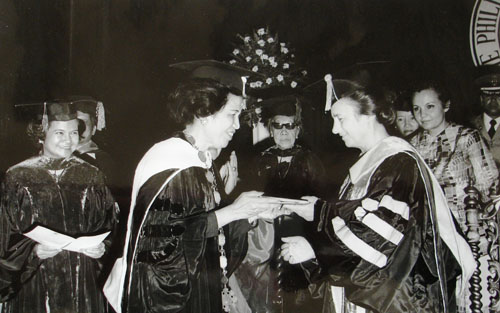
Elena Ceauşescu becoming Doctor Honoris Causa of the University of Manila, Philippines, in 1975

Some universities and colleges have been accused of granting honorary degrees in exchange for large donations.

The nomination of politicians for honorary degrees has often proven controversial. These have included Andrew Jackson's LLD from Harvard in 1833, drawing particular ire from Jackson's political rival, former president John Quincy Adams, then a member of Harvard's board of trustees; the withdrawal of the nomination of Ramsay MacDonald, Britain's first Labour prime minister for an honorary doctorate at Cambridge in 1926; Oxford's award to Dean Acheson, the US Secretary of State, in 1952; Cambridge's award to Viscount Hailsham, the first cabinet minister for science and technology, in 1963, which led to a tightening of the nomination rules to reduce the risk of controversy: Oxford's voting down of honours for Zulfikar Ali Bhutto, prime minister of Pakistan, in 1975 and of Margaret Thatcher, prime minister of Britain, in 1983 (both Oxford graduates); Yale's award to George W. Bush in 2001, boycotted by 170 professors; and the refusal of an honorary degree to Barack Obama at Arizona State University when speaking at its graduation ceremony in 2009. Such controversies have led some universitas, including Oxford and Cambridge, to institute rigorous policies that restrict controversial awards.

Politics can also be involved in the revocation of honorary degrees. In the 1930s, the University of Berlin revoked the honorary degree it has awarded to author and Nobel laureate Thomas Mann under pressure from the Nazi regime, leading to multiple international universities, including Harvard, awarding him honorary degrees. Keele University revoked Austrian president and former UN Secretary-General Kurt Waldheim's honorary degree after revelations that he had facilitated war crimes during World War Two. In 2007, protesters demanded that the University of Edinburgh revoke an honorary degree awarded to Zimbabwean leader Robert Mugabe in 1984. The university subsequently reviewed its honorary degree policy and revoked Mugabe's degree, as well as instituting a more rigorous selection procedure for recipients of honorary degrees. His honorary degrees from the University of Massachusetts Amherst and the University of Michigan were also revoked following student pressure. Robert Gordon University revoked then US presidential candidate Donald Trump's honorary DBA in 2015 after his call for a ban on Muslims entering the US.

Universities have also been accused of giving honorary degrees, particularly to celebrities, in order to attract publicity rather than to recognise achievements. In 1996, Southampton College at Long Island University (now a campus of Stony Brook University) awarded an Honorary Doctorate of Amphibious Letters to Muppet Kermit the Frog. Although some students objected to awarding a degree to a Muppet, the small college received considerable press coverage.

== Other types of honorary or unearned degree ==
The broader definition of honorary degrees used by bodies such as the Quality Assurance Agency for Higher Education takes in any degree that is not an "academic qualification" (i.e., an earned degree), whether to honour an individual or to reflect their status. This includes various forms of degrees, some of which are mostly historical but are still used at a few institutions.

=== Degrees by inception ===
MA degrees have been awarded to BA graduates at some universities without examination since the 18th century, via a process known as inception. They have been referred to as 'honorific' and 'honorary' degrees. However, as they are granted on the basis of having passed the BA examinations, they are sometimes considered to be earned degrees.

=== Degrees by incorporation ===
These are normally substantive degrees, awarded on the basis of having gained the same or a near-equivalent degree at another university.

=== Lambeth degrees ===
The Archbishop of Canterbury has the authority to award degrees, known as "Lambeth degrees", that are sometimes referred to as honorary. These are substantive degrees, awarded under the Peter's Pence Act 1533, "in recognition of [recipients] particular contributions to religious, academic and public life", but without any requirements for residence of examination.

=== Official degrees ===
Some universities and colleges have the custom of awarding "official degrees", normally bachelor's or master's degrees, to staff, which may be considered honorary or substantive degrees. At Trinity College Dublin, any staff member (academic or non-academic) who has over ten years of continuous service may be awarded a Master of Arts jure officii. At Oxford, these are degrees by resolution (or, historically, degrees by special resolution and degrees by decree) and at Cambridge these are degrees under Statute B II 2. At Oxford, Cambridge and Dublin, these are substantive degrees rather than honorary degrees, with the same rights as incorporated degrees, although sometimes referred to as honorary degrees by modern writers, but in most other universities these are honorary degrees.

Durham awarded official degrees as degrees by vote of convocation between 1901 and 1935. As at Oxford, Cambridge and Dublin, these were substantive degrees with "the full rights and privileges belonging to the degrees conferred", except that membership of convocation would lapse when the recipient left the university staff and there was no right to proceed to another degree. From at least 1948, Durham granted service degrees to staff. In 1974, the awarding of service degrees was explicitly added to the powers of senate in the statutes. Bristol also awarded service degrees in at least the early 20th century.

Grants of degree-awarding powers in England continue to enable providers to confer degrees on members of their staff in addition to earned and honorary degrees.

A similar custom is followed by a few universities in the United States that grant an honorary Master of Arts degree to professors at various stages in their career (in some cases referred to as an ad eundem degree). These include on being awarded tenure, on becoming a full professor, and on retirement. Because these degrees do not involve any further study, many faculty members do not list them on their curricula vitae, although some choose to do so.

At Brown and Harvard the degrees are awarded to those faculty who are granted tenure and the rank of associate professor, usually after approximately eight years of service to the university as an assistant professor or for a shorter amount of time for a professor with prior service at another university.

At Harvard the degree is described as given ut in grege nostro numeretur ("so that (s)he may be numbered in our flock"). During the 1950s, it was noted that the degree were "not announced at Commencement, or included in the printed list of honorary degrees circulated at that time, nor is there any 'citation.'" Instead, the President of Harvard would present "the diploma at the first meeting of the faculty following the recipient's appointment to permanent rank."

At Brown, the degrees have been awarded as a part of the annual May commencement ceremony.

At Amherst, Wesleyan, and Yale, the degrees are conferred upon those who rise to the rank of full professor. Yale refers to this degree as the MA Privatim. During the 150th anniversary of Princeton University, in 1896, 16 full professors were awarded the MA Privatim.

At Amherst, in recent years, the degrees are awarded during first-year student convocation in August, at Yale it is an "elegant, brief ceremony, usual in February or March", and at Wesleyan as part of commencement in May.

Amherst College grants this degree to college faculty despite the fact that it grants only bachelor's degrees to its matriculated students. However, those professors who already earned a bachelor's degree at Amherst or Wesleyan by attending as an undergraduate are not presented with a second degree. In 2024, Amherst College President Michael A. Elliott called this additional rule a "custom, some might say a strange custom".

=== Dignity degrees ===
A jure dignitatis degree, or degree by diploma at Oxford (and some other institutions), was historically awarded to someone who had demonstrated eminence and scholarship by being appointed to a particular office. Thus, for example, a Doctor of Divinity (DD) might be conferred upon a bishop on the occasion of his consecration, or a judge created a Doctor of Laws (LLD) or a (Doctor of Civil Law (DCL) upon their appointment to the judicial bench. These are, like official degrees at Oxford, Cambridge and Dublin, substantive degrees rather than honorary degrees, but are often referred to as honorary degrees by modern writers. Reforms at Oxford and Cambridge in the 1920s effectively ended dignity degrees; in the modern era, only Oxford continues to award these, and only to heads of state, royalty, and chancellors of the university.

Cambridge's 1882 statutes allowed full degrees to be awarded honoris causa to members of the royal family, peers, privy counsellors, bishops, deans of cathedrals and the royal peculiars, heads of colleges, Cambridge graduates, and holders of university offices. The statutes of 1926 removed this power. Durham awarded degrees by diploma from 1840 until 1920. After 1909, these were referred to in the regulations as honorary degrees jure dignitatis, awarded under the statute for honorary degrees, and were listed with honorary degrees rather than degrees by diploma in the calendar.

== Rights ==
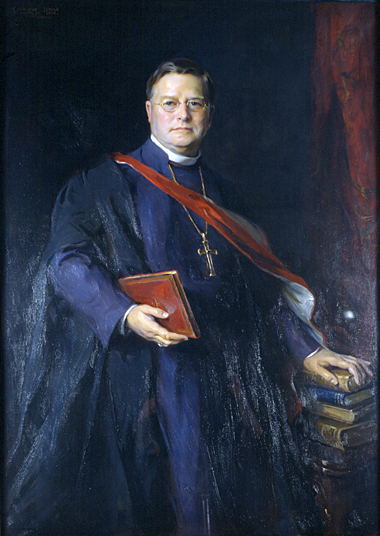
Portrait of William Temple in 1934 as Archbishop of York, wearing the hood of his honorary DD Cantab, awarded the previous year.

Honorary degrees do not confer the same rights as substantive degrees, but always include the right to use the title of the degree and to wear academic dress. At Cambridge, the regulations are explicit that what is conferred is the title of the degree. At Oxford, Cambridge and Durham, honorary graduates are not members of the assembly of graduates (convocation at Oxford and Durham; senate at Cambridge). However, honorary graduates of Yale can participate in the election of alumni fellows to the Yale Corporation. Recipients of honorary degrees typically wear the same academic dress as recipients of substantive degrees, although there are a few exceptions: at the University of St Andrews, honorary graduates wear a black cassock instead of the usual full-dress gown; at Kingston University, honorary graduates wear a distinctive hood; at the University of Northumbria the colours of the hoods and gowns are different for honorary degrees; and at Harvard the 'crows feet' on the facing of the gown have three loops rather than the two loops of an earned degree. At Cambridge, honorary graduates do not wear the hoods of their honorary degrees at the graduation ceremony.

=== Use of the style of Dr ===
Convention over use of Dr has evolved over the years, with Debrett's advising as recently as 1992 that recipients of honorary doctorates were entitled to use the style, although this had changed to advice that "the recipient does not generally adopt the title of 'Doctor'" by 2021. Accepted usage has also varied geographically, with the use of the title being more common in Scotland than in England. Prior to around 1800, it can also be hard to determine whether an unearned degree is substantive (where there is no dispute about the right to use the title) or honorary, and modern authors will often refer to all unearned degrees as honorary.

The use of the prefix by holders of dignity degrees in the 19th century was common and accepted. In Anthony Trollope's Barchester Towers, he notes in the conclusion that his character Mr Arabian is now Dr Arabin as "we suppose he must have become a doctor when he became a dean". Similarly, the 18th century author and lexicographer Samuel Johnson, who had been unable to complete his undergraduate studies at Pembroke College, Oxford, due to financial considerations, received an MA from Oxford in 1755, an LLD from Trinity College, Dublin in 1765 and a DCL from Oxford in 1775. Although Johnson's degrees are today often considered honorary, they were issued by diploma (the Oxford term for a dignity degree) rather than honoris causa, and he was commonly referred to as Dr Johnson.

In the modern era, recipients of honorary doctorates do not normally use the title of Dr in general correspondence in most parts of the English speaking world, nor is the title used when referring to or addressing or them, except by the granting institution. However, this is, in most countries and situations, a social convention rather than a hard rule, so universities can only suggest that honorary graduates do not use the title or ask that they "refrain from adopting the misleading title".

Even in the modern era, holders of honorary doctorates in positions of academic or ecclesiastical leadership are sometimes referred to as Dr. The title was used for Bill Bryson as chancellor of Durham University both in the press and by the university. (Note: His education concluded with an undergraduate degree, but Durham University awarded him an honorary DCL the year before his appointment as chancellor.) Archbishops of Canterbury to have been referred to as Dr without an earned doctorate include Justin Welby, Robert Runcie and Michael Ramsey.

Notable people who have used the prefix while holding only an honorary doctorate include:

- Maya Angelou, a memoirist and poet, had no earned degrees, but she received dozens of honorary ones and she preferred to be called "Dr. Angelou" by people other than family and close friends.
- Stephen Colbert, who received an honorary doctorate in fine arts from Knox College in 2006, frequently made light of the concept of an "honorary doctor" by offering up scurrilous medical advice in a segment called "Cheating Death With Dr. Stephen Colbert, D.F.A." on his television program The Colbert Report after being awarded a DFA.
- Benjamin Franklin received an honorary master's degree from The College of William and Mary in 1756, and doctorates from the University of St Andrews in 1759 and the University of Oxford in 1762 for his scientific accomplishments. He thereafter referred to himself as "Doctor Franklin".
- Alan García, former Peruvian president and politician, for many years used the title of "Dr." in official presentations as head of state and as a civilian throughout his political career. Heavily criticized by the media when discovering his last degree to be a master's in economic development and not completing his doctoral studies in law, he was awarded an honorary doctorate from the University of Delhi in 1987, while making an official visit to India in his first term as president.
- Edwin H. Land, who invented the Land Camera instant camera, and was a co-founder of the Polaroid Corporation, received an honorary doctorate from Harvard University and was often referred to as "Dr. Land", though he did not have any earned degree.
- Sukarno, the first president of Indonesia, was awarded 26 honorary doctorates from various international universities including Columbia University, the University of Michigan, the University of Berlin, the Al-Azhar University, the University of Belgrade, the Lomonosov University and many more; and also from domestic universities, including the Universitas Gadjah Mada, the Universitas Indonesia, the Bandung Institute of Technology, and the Universitas Padjadjaran. He had often been referred to by the Indonesian Government at the time as "Dr. Ir. Sukarno", combined with his engineer's degree (Ir.) from Bandung Institute of Technology.

== See also ==
- List of honorary degrees
- Honorary title (academic)
- Freedom of the City
