= Hitchin (hundred) =

Historical division of Hertfordshire, England

Hitchin hundred was a judicial and taxation subdivision (a "hundred") of Hertfordshire, in the east of the county, that existed from the 10th to the 19th century. It was also known as a "Half Hundred" - the total size in the Domesday Book being around 40 hides - and it was also sometimes called "Hitchin and Pirton" and "Ippollyts".

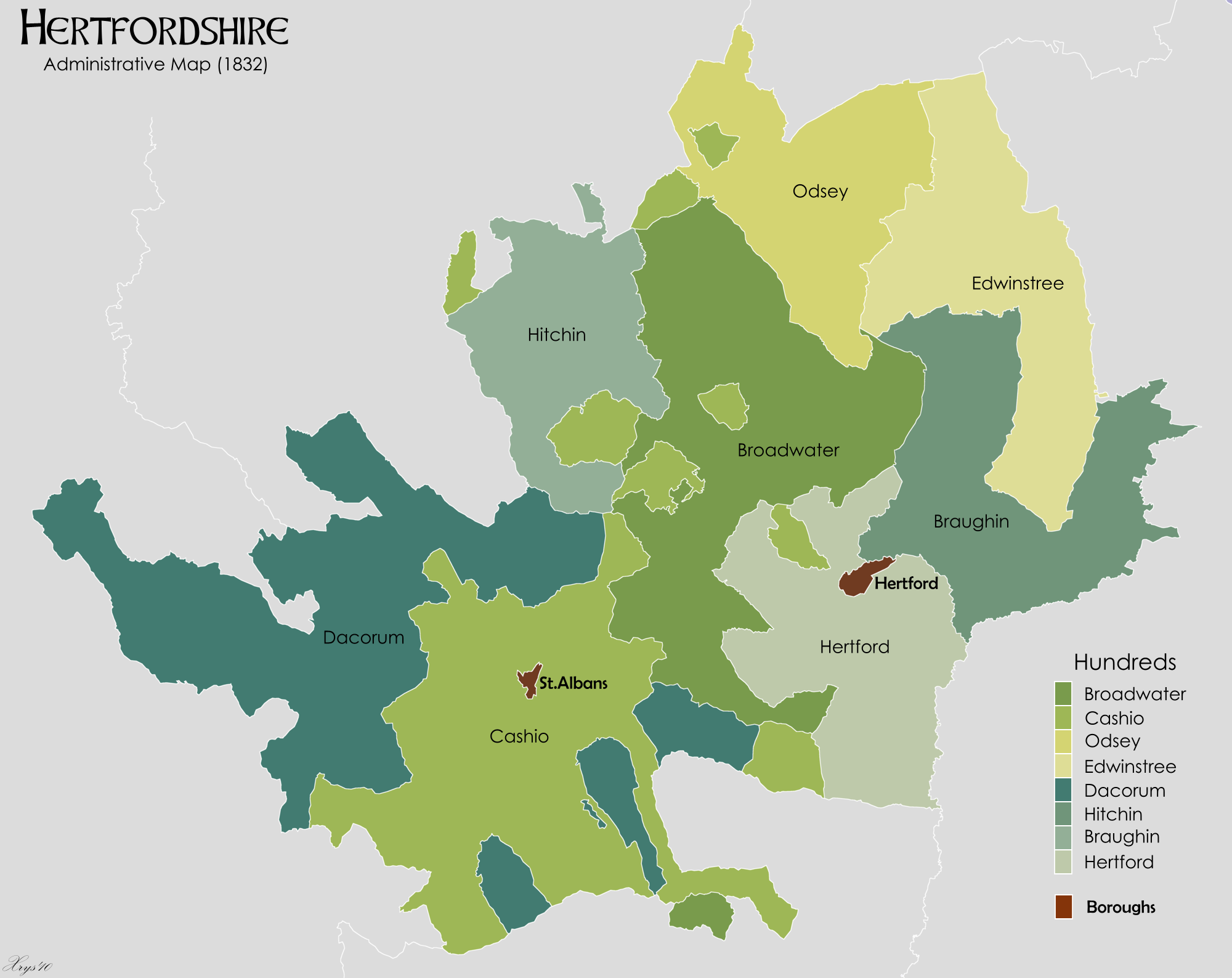
Hertfordshire hundreds in 1832

It comprised the following parishes: Hitchin, St Ippollyts, Kimpton, Kings Walden, Lilley, Offley and Pirton. Hexton and St Paul's Walden were also part of the hundred until transferred to the Liberty of St Albans before 1286. The hundred court was originally held at Sperberry Hill ("the hill of speech"), in the chapelry of St Ippollyts. It later met in various places including Hitchin, Ippollitts, Kimpton and Pirton. The hundred was owned by the King.

Haslam proposes that the hundred was originally part of a larger "proto-hundred" which crossed the Hertfordshire-Bedfordshire border and supported a supposed burh at Hitchin. This proto-hundred was consistent with the region of the Hicce, mentioned in the Tribal Hidage as a Middle Anglian grouping that held 300 hides, and with the territory of the minster and royal estate centred at Hitchin. As well as Hitchin Hundred, this included Clifton hundred in Bedfordshire and possibly the northern half of Flitt Hundred.
