= Edward Horsey =

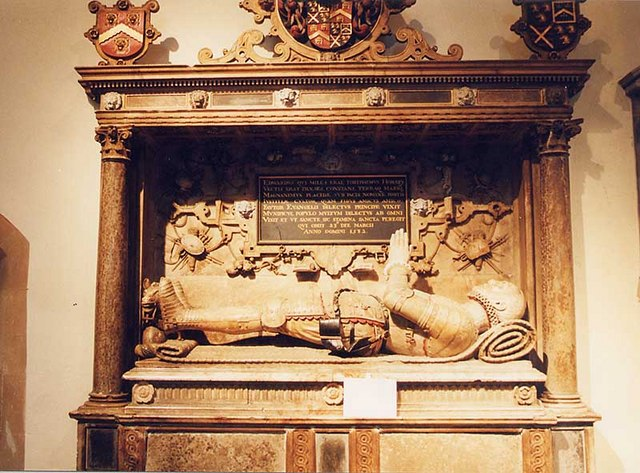
Monument with effigy of Sir Edward Horsey, St Thomas's Church, Newport

Sir Edward Horsey (1525 – 21 March 1583) was a conspirator against Queen Mary, then a soldier, ambassador and courtier under Queen Elizabeth.

He was the eldest son of Jasper Horsey of Exton Devon and his wife Joan, who also had three other sons – Francis, George and John. Nothing is known of his early life or education but he may have fought as a soldier of fortune on the continent and been part of an embassy to France in 1551.

== Conspirator ==
Edward Horsey was reported for spreading a rumour in Dorset of a revolt against Mary and her consort Philip II of Spain in July 1555, and met with other malcontents in London shortly afterwards, becoming involved with the Throckmorton Plot. He went into exile in France in March 1556 and was part of the Dudley conspiracy to overthrow the monarchy, with his brother Francis. The conspirators met Henry II of France who promised them assistance but the plot was discovered and came to nothing. Horsey was made an outlaw. In France, Edward Horsey married an unknown French woman and met Robert Dudley, who later became Earl of Leicester. After Elizabeth's accession he had to remain in France but reported French "Sea Matters" to the English court. By summer 1562 he was Cecil's agent in Dieppe.

== Soldier ==
In July 1562 Edward Horsey returned to England to report on the strife in France. Although still technically an outlaw, he was rewarded by a licence to import French wines into England. He was ordered back to France to help organise the defense of Dieppe and Rouen. He led a band of soldiers into battle near Harfleur. When the Huguenots surrendered Dieppe Horsey served as a treaty hostage but was eventually released. He was then formally pardoned for his part in the conspiracy against Philip and Mary, and named Captain of the Isle of Wight in the summer of 1565. He supervised the refurbishment of the island's defences against the expected Spanish invasion, including the repair of Carisbroke castle and West Cowes fort.

As Admiral of Hampshire, Horsey was responsible for reporting hostile naval activity and pirates. In December 1568 he seized several Spanish vessels with a treasure valued at £31,000. The next year he commanded a troop against the rebels in the Northern Uprising. Until 1571, when it was forbidden by the Privy Council, he gave assistance to the Sea Beggars in the Channel. In August 1571 he outfitted a ship for Martin Frobisher. In the autumn of 1576 he was authorised by the Privy Council to capture French pirates in the English Channel.

In 1577 and afterwards Horsey was involved in a project to make gunpowder with Cornelius Stephenson. He became involved in plans to repel an expected Spanish invasion of Ireland.

== Ambassador ==
Edward Horsey led embassies to Flanders in 1568 and to France in 1573. He negotiated on behalf of English merchants and pleaded for the Protestant subjects of the king of Spain. Then in 1576 he was sent to Don John of Austria to defuse the situation with the rebellious Spanish Netherlands. Don John and the states agreed terms and Horsey was rewarded in December 1577 with a knighthood.

== Courtier ==
Edward was a long time friend of the Earl of Leicester and gave the bride, Lady Douglas Sheffield, away in her secret marriage to him in 1573. He undertook other tasks for Leicester and became a respected member of the Royal Court. He supplied a ship for Hawkins' venture in the West Indies and was listed as a venturer "who promised but paid nothing" for Frobisher's attempted voyage to Cathay.

Horsey had been appointed a justice of the peace for Hampshire and Wight in 1569, which post he held until he died. He was a Member of Parliament in 1571 for Southampton (of which he had been made a burgess the year before) and then in 1572 for the county of Hampshire. On 22 May 1572 he was named on committees concerning firearms and 8 March one on Justices of the Forest. As Captain of the Isle of Wight he was appointed to committees dealing with ports and wines. He was appointed Keeper of Carisbroke park and Steward of Crworn Lands on the island as well as Commissioner for Piracy from 1565.

By 1580 Edward Horsey was living at Great Haseley manor near Arreton on the Isle of Wight with Cowsebel Mille, who he would have married except that he had a wife in France. He enjoyed hunting and is said to have introduced hares into the island. In November 1580 he entertained the Portuguese Ambassador though many members of his household were "down with the disease". He seems to have contracted the plague shortly afterwards but recovered. By this time he had appointed a lieutenant to suppress piracy, whose negligence had led to an increase in their activity.

Sir Edward became ill again the following year and died in February 1583. His lands in Hampshire, Dorset, and Wiltshire passed to his brother George. He was buried in March in Carisbroke church. His alabaster and marble monument with effigy survives in St Thomas's Church, Newport, with his arms displayed above.
