= Samuel Richard Block =

Samuel Richard Block (died 11 December 1864) was an English merchant, High Sheriff of Hertfordshire in 1863 and a justice of the peace for Hertfordshire, Middlesex and the liberty of St. Albans.

== Gallery ==
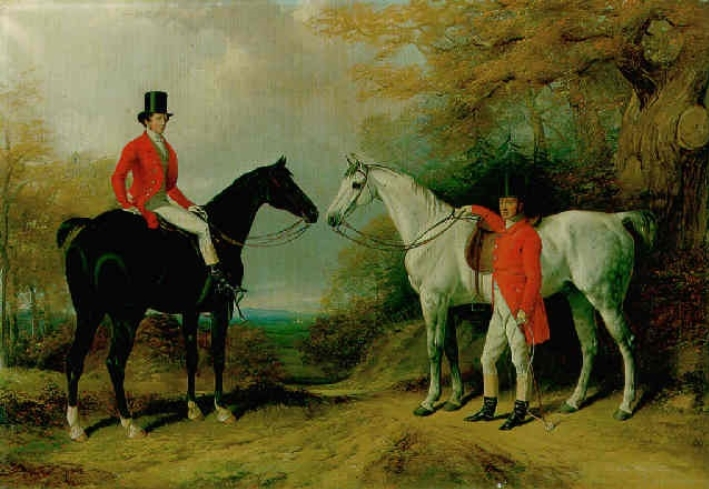
Portrait of Samuel Richard Block, of Greenhill, Barnet, later High Sheriff of Hertfordshire, and his third son, Adam Henry Block. William Barraud, oil on canvas, 1846.

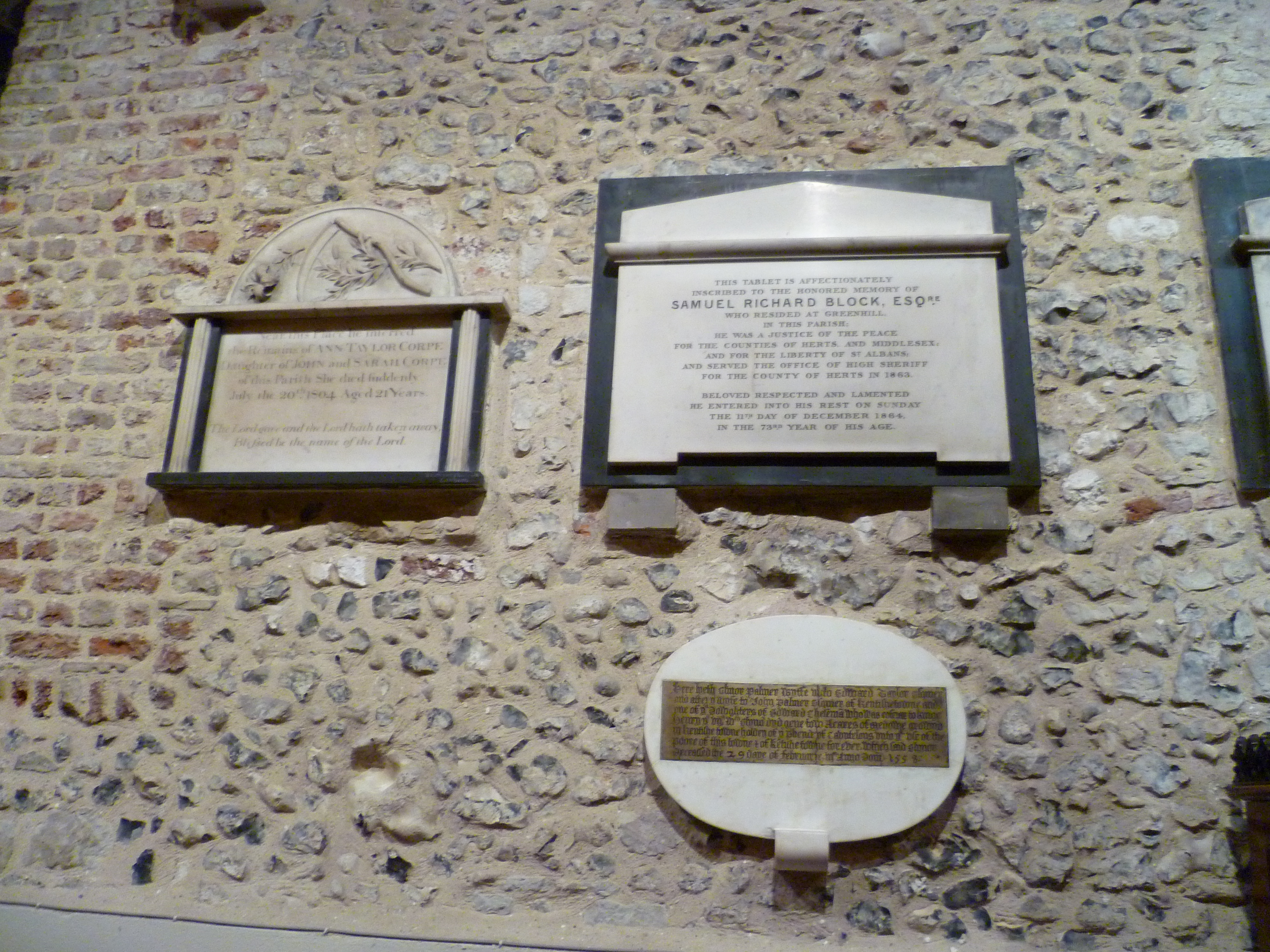
Plaque to the memory of Block at St John the Baptist Church, Chipping Barnet.

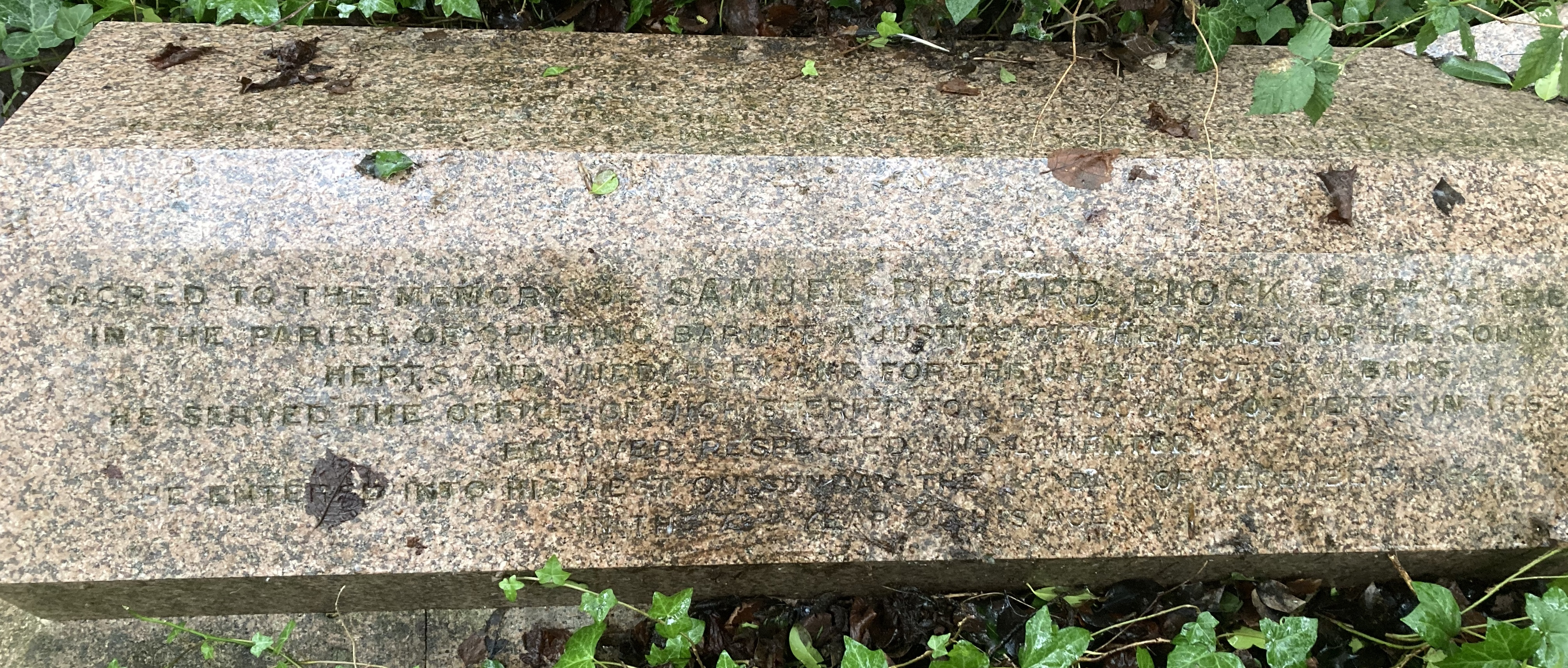
Grave of Samuel Richard Block in Highgate Cemetery (west side)
