= George Horsey (MP, died 1588) =

16th-century English politician

George Horsey (1526 – 6 February 1588), of Digswell, Hertfordshire, was an English politician.

He was the eldest son of Jasper Horsey of Exton, Devon and brother of Edward Horsey.

He was a justice of the peace for Hertfordshire from c. 1559, a deputy lieutenant of the county from Nov. 1569 and High Sheriff of Hertfordshire for 1572–73.

Horsey was elected a Member of the Parliament of England for Clitheroe in 1571, Preston in 1572 and Aldborough in 1586.

He married twice: firstly Mary, the daughter and heiress of Thomas Perient of Digswell, and the widow of Amphibalus Rowlett and secondly Anne, daughter of Sir Ralph Sadler, with whom he had 2 sons and 3 daughters.
