= Telegraph Hill, Hertfordshire =

Nature reserve in Hertfordshire, England

Coordinates: 51.9458°N 0.3726°W

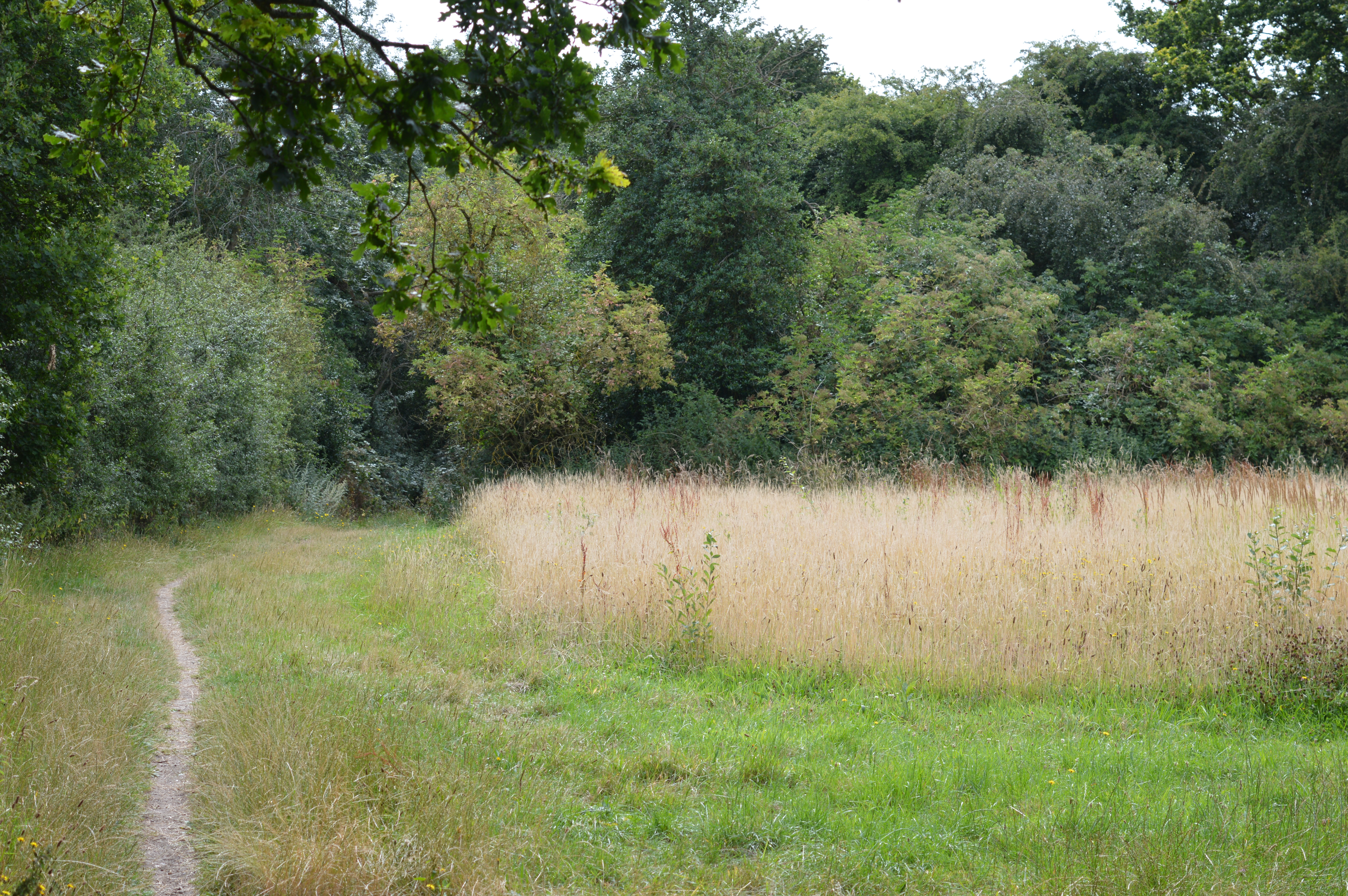

Telegraph Hill is a nature reserve near Lilley in north Hertfordshire. It is in the Chilterns Area of Outstanding Natural Beauty (AONB). According to the Chilterns AONB, the hill is owned by the Herts and Middlesex Wildlife Trust; a notice on the site says that it is managed by the trust, but it is not listed on the trust's web site as one of its reserves.

== Ecology ==
The site is a mixture of chalk grassland and scrub, with ancient beech trees. Wild flowers include rock rose, salad burnet and common spotted orchid.

Telegraph Hill is close to Deacon Hill, a Site of Special Scientific Interest over the county boundary in Bedfordshire.

== Etymology ==
The hill is located on the ancient Icknield Way (day three of the Icknield Way Path between Streatley and Ickleford goes through the site). Between 1796 and 1814 it was a telegraph station, one of the links in the chain between Great Yarmouth and London during the Napoleonic Wars.
