= Lilley, Hertfordshire =

Village in Hertfordshire, England

Coordinates: 51.922243°N 0.372468°W

Lilley
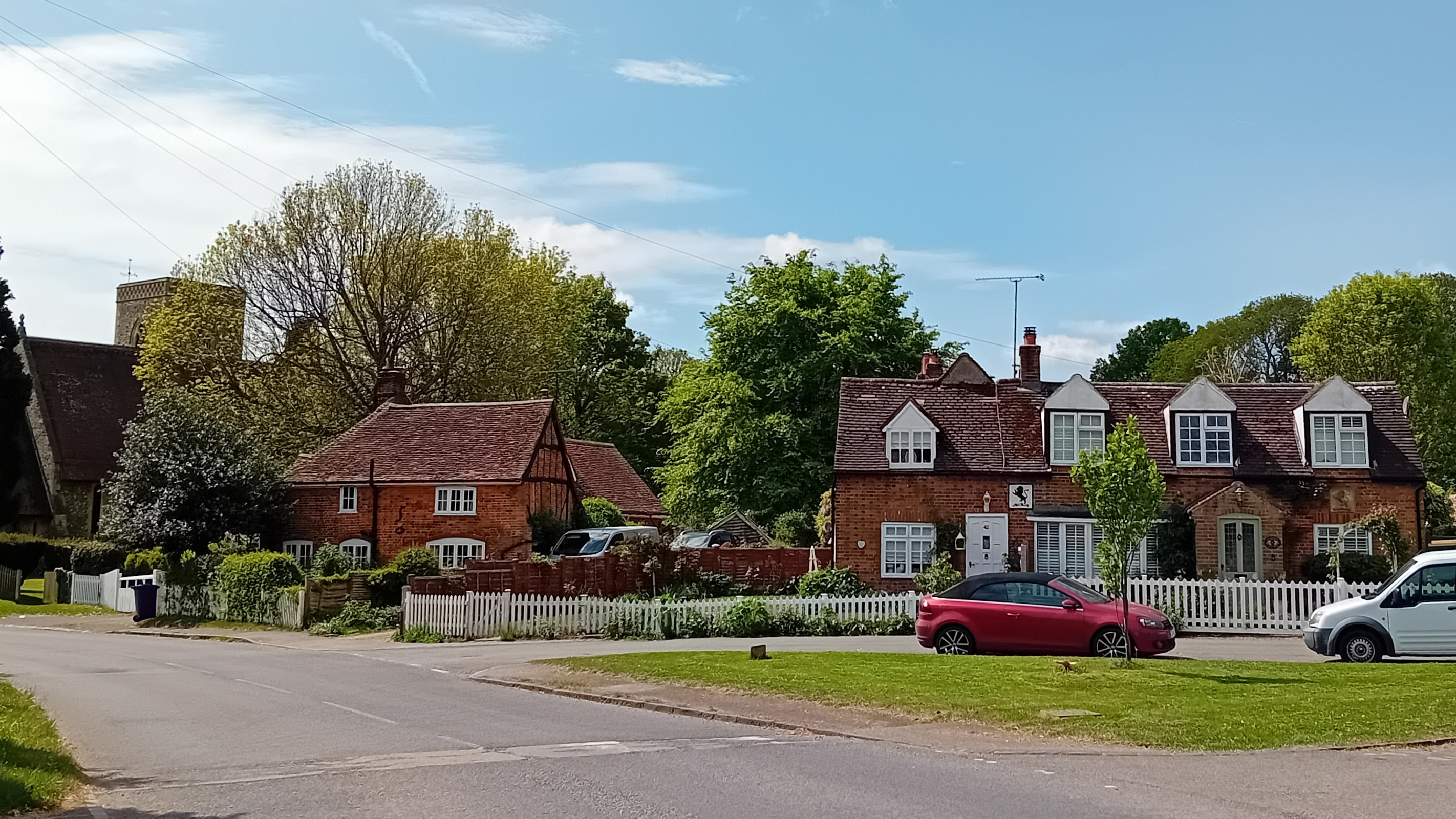
- Cottages at West Street

- Location within Hertfordshire
- Population: 384 (Parish, 2021)
- OS grid reference: TL120261
- Civil parish: Lilley
- District: North Hertfordshire
- Shire county: Hertfordshire
- Region: East
- Country: England
- Sovereign state: United Kingdom
- Post town: LUTON
- Postcode district: LU2
- Dialling code: 01462
- Police: Hertfordshire
- Fire: Hertfordshire
- Ambulance: East of England
- UK Parliament: Hitchin

Lilley is a village and civil parish in the North Hertfordshire district of Hertfordshire, England. It lies 3 miles (5 km) north-east of the centre of Luton, its post town, and 4 miles (6 km) west of Hitchin. The parish had a population of 384 at the 2021 census.

== Geography ==
The village lies in a dry valley within the Chiltern Hills, a designated Area of Outstanding Natural Beauty. The valley continues for several miles to the south of the village, where it is known as Lilley Bottom, extending into the parishes of Offley and King's Walden. There is a ridge of high ground to the east of the village known as Lilley Hoo, which reaches its highest point at Telegraph Hill, 184 metres (604 ft) above sea level.

The Icknield Way Path passes the edge of the parish on its 110-mile course from Ivinghoe Beacon in Buckinghamshire to Knettishall Heath in Suffolk. There is one public house in the village, the Lilley Arms on West Street.

== History ==
Lilley was already a settlement at the time of the Domesday Book of 1086, in the hundred of Hitchin, when it was owned by Geoffrey of Bec. It was described as having a priest, suggesting it was also an established parish.

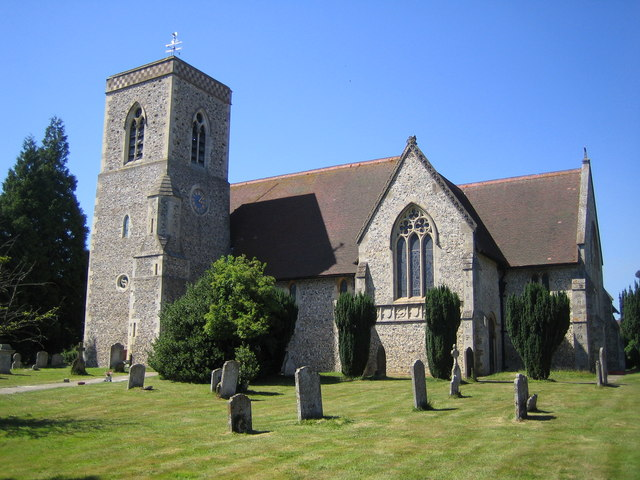
St Peter's Church

St Peter's Church is known to have existed from at least the 12th century. It was completely rebuilt between 1870 and 1872, with a couple of features from the earlier building re-used in the new one.

According to tradition, in the early 19th century Lilley was the residence of John Kellerman, an alleged occultist described by Sir Richard Phillips as the "last of the alchemists."

== Governance ==
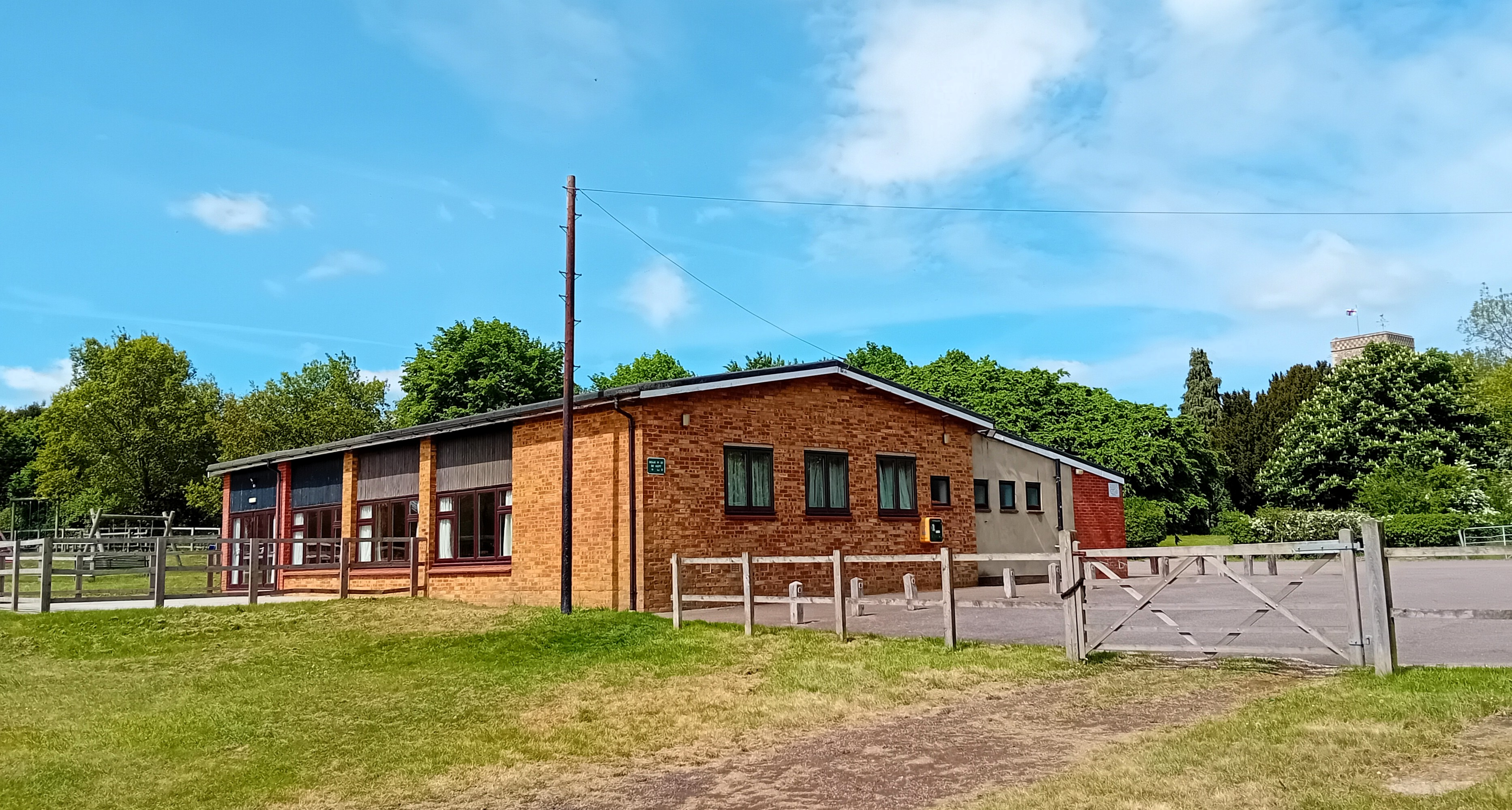
Cassel Memorial Hall

There are three tiers of local government covering Lilley, at parish, district, and county level: Lilley Parish Council, North Hertfordshire District Council, and Hertfordshire County Council. The parish council meets at the village hall, known as the Cassel Memorial Hall, which is in the recreation ground off West Street.

For national elections, Lilley forms part of the Hitchin constituency.

== Sport ==
The village cricket club is one of the oldest in Hertfordshire, with fixtures dating back to the mid-1890s. The cricket club plays at the Geoff Banks-Smith Memorial Cricket Ground, between St Peter's Church and the village hall.

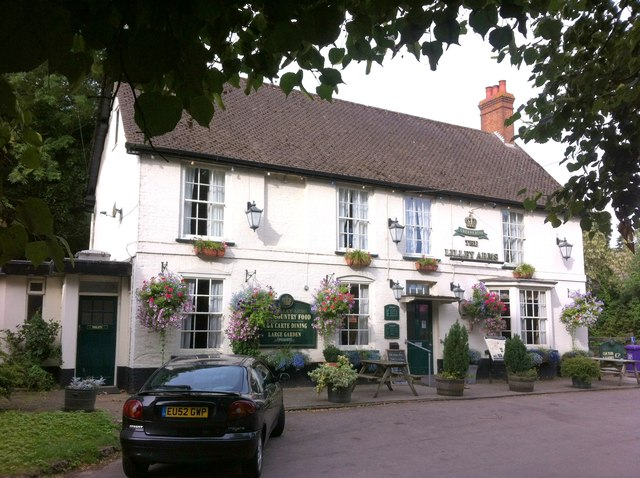
The Lilley Arms
