= Liberty of St Albans =

Area in Hertfordshire, England

The Liberty of St Albans (also known as the Hundred of Albanestou or Cashio) was a liberty situated within Hertfordshire, but enjoying the powers of an independent county. At the time of the Domesday Book the liberty was known as Albanestou and originally had the powers of a hundred. It was originally associated with the Abbey of St Albans, and later with the borough corporation. It was absorbed by Hertfordshire in 1874.

The origins of the liberty are unclear, but the abbots of St Albans claimed that the privileges had first been granted by King Offa of Mercia, who founded the abbey in 793. The Liberty appears to have contained parts of the Dioceses of London and Lincoln.

Haslam proposes that Cashio and Danais hundreds were originally a larger "proto-hundred" which was originally created to support the burh at St Albans by King Edward the Elder in the 900s to defend against the Danes. The interlocking nature of the two hundreds, together with the unique status of Cashio as a Liberty of the church, is taken as evidence that they were originally part of a single unit that was later subdivided into hundreds.

The boundaries of the area expanded over time, including at times parts of Buckinghamshire. Several parishes across Hertfordshire, often where the abbey also held the manor, were transferred to the Liberty of St Albans from their original hundred, including:

- Hexton and St Paul's Walden from Hitchin hundred
- Shephall, Norton and Codicote from Broadwater hundred
- Bramfield from Hertford hundred
- Newnham from Odsey hundred

Exactly what powers the liberty possessed previous to the twelfth century are not known. Edward I gave the abbot of St Albans palatine powers equal to those enjoyed by the bishops of Durham and Ely.

With the dissolution of the abbey the Borough of St Albans was granted a charter of incorporation as a free borough, having previously been under the control of the abbot. The liberty was henceforth placed under the corporation of the borough. Palatine status was discontinued, although the borough and liberty retained its own quarter sessions. The administration was headed by a high steward chosen by the corporation.

The liberty was merged with the county of Hertfordshire in 1874 by Act of Parliament, which divided the county into two divisions, the eastern part of the county to be the Hertford division and the western part to be known as the Liberty of St Albans Division, each maintaining separate quarter sessions, but being a single commission of the peace. The Act made clear that, despite its name, the St Albans division was not to be deemed a liberty in any future legislation.

In 1889 the Local Government Act 1888 created an elected Hertfordshire county council which covered both divisions. For some time after its creation, the county administration was divided between Hertford and St Albans.

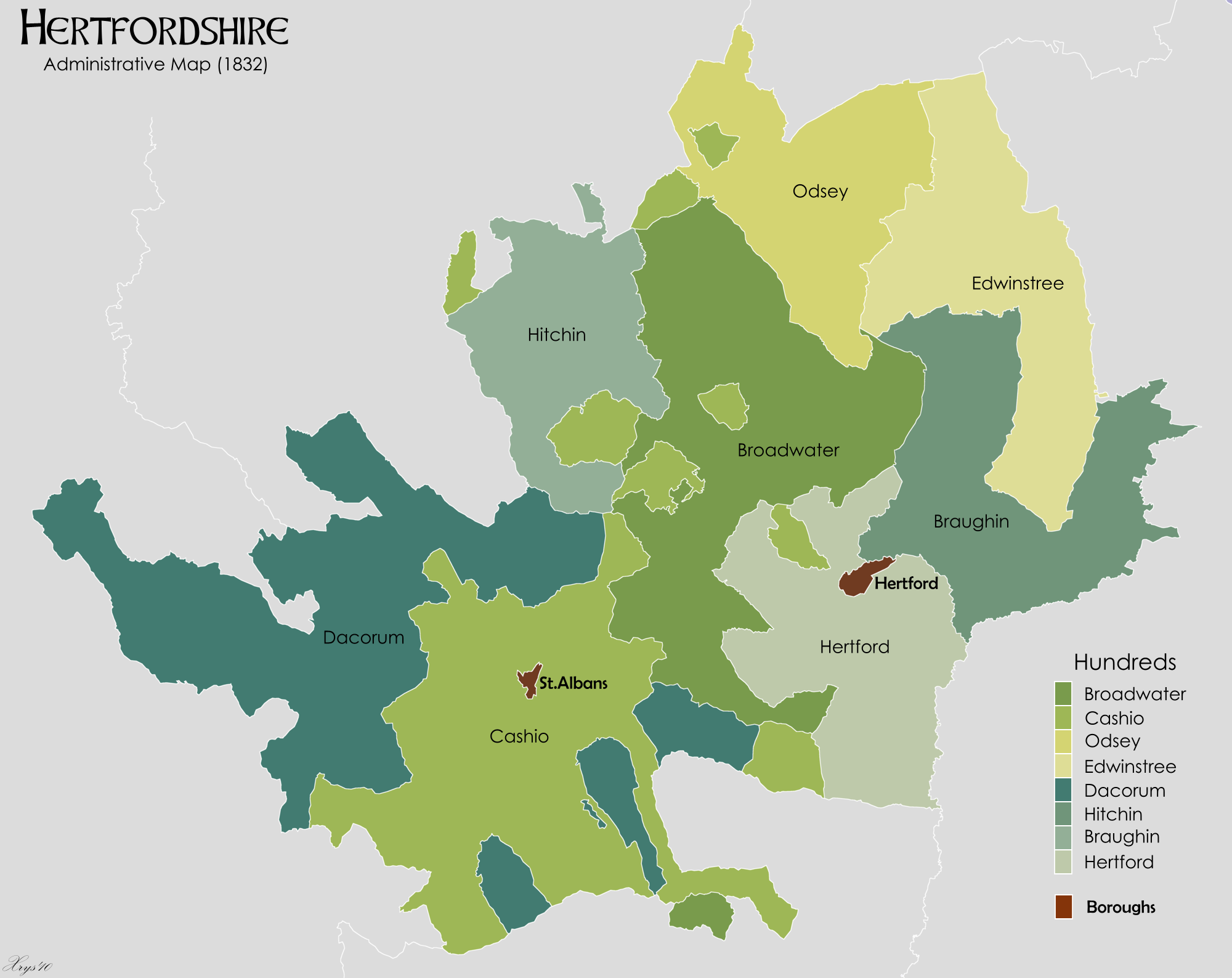
Hertfordshire Hundreds in 1832

By the nineteenth century the liberty contained all or part of the following parishes:

- Abbots Langley
- Aldenham
- Bramfield
- Chipping Barnet
- Codicote
- East Barnet
- Elstree
- Hexton
- Newnham
- Northaw
- Norton
- Redbourn
- Rickmansworth
- Ridge
- St Albans (within the borough of St Albans)
- St Michael (partly within the borough of St Albans)
- St Paul's Walden
- St Peter (partly within the borough of St Albans)
- St Stephen (partly within the borough of St Albans from 1835)
- Sandridge (partly within the borough of St Albans from 1887)
- Sarratt
- Shephall
- South Mimms
- Watford
