= Hexton =

Village in Hertfordshire, England

Coordinates: 51.960823°N 0.393150°W

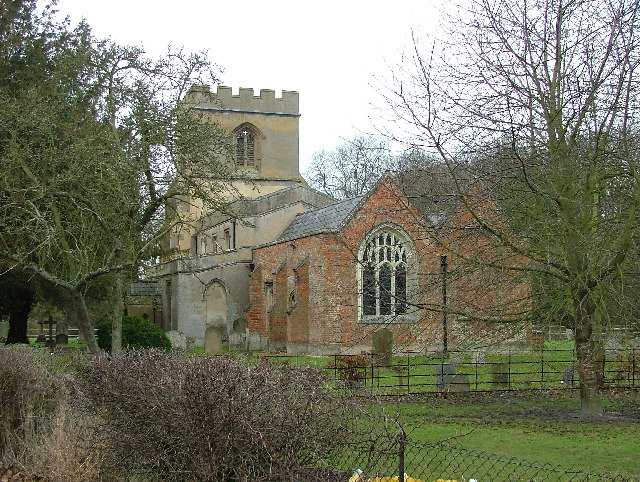
- St Faith's Church, Hexton

- Location within Hertfordshire
- Population: 123 (Parish, 2021)
- OS grid reference: TL105303
- Civil parish: Hexton
- District: North Hertfordshire
- Shire county: Hertfordshire
- Region: East
- Country: England
- Sovereign state: United Kingdom
- Post town: HITCHIN
- Postcode district: SG5
- Dialling code: 01582
- Police: Hertfordshire
- Fire: Hertfordshire
- Ambulance: East of England
- UK Parliament: Hitchin

Hexton is a small village and civil parish in Hertfordshire, England, about 6 miles (10 km) west of Hitchin.

This parish is a salient of Hertfordshire jutting northwards into Bedfordshire. The southern half of the parish is part of the chalky downs of the Chiltern Hills, which are covered with short turf and plantations of fir trees. The hills end abruptly and close to their foot lies the village of Hexton. It stands among grass fields and orchards at the beginning of a low plain, which, sloping gradually to the north, becomes merged in the large plain of southern Bedfordshire. The southern boundary of the parish is the grassy Icknield Way.

Hexton formerly belonged to the half-hundred of Hitchin, but when it came into the possession of the abbots of St Albans Abbey it was probably added by them to their hundred of Cashio. Hexton was originally named Hehstanstuna, Hegestanestone (11th century); Hextenestona (14th century); Hextone (15th century), from Anglo-Saxon Heahstānes tūn.

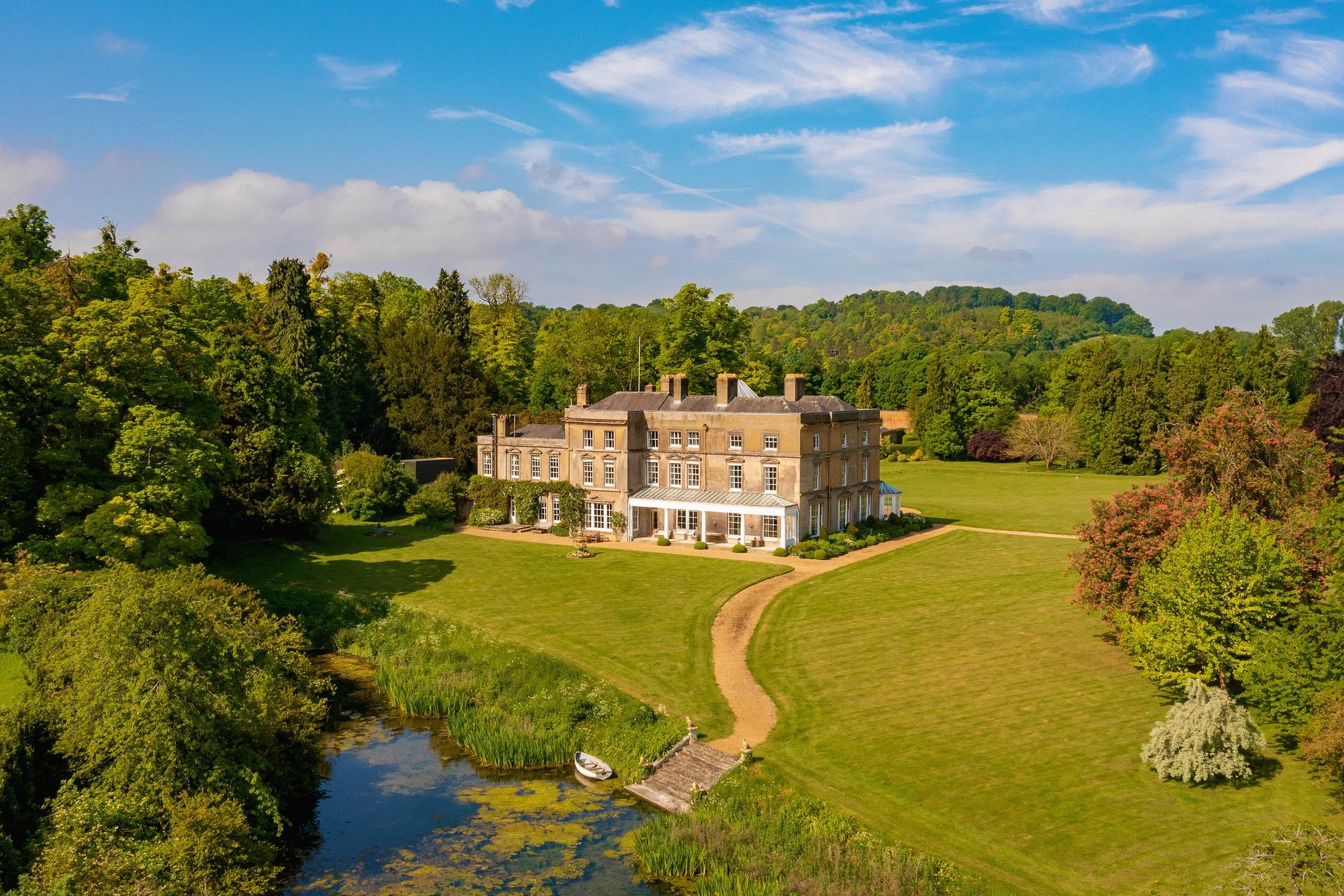
Hexton Manor in 2022

Much of the parish was owned by George Hodgson, owner of Hexton Manor, a large modernized house standing in an extensive park. There is no regular village street, but most of the houses are near cross roads, which lead north, south, east and west and connect Hexton with the neighbouring small villages.

Hexton stands in well-wooded and hilly country adjacent to the Bedfordshire border. The church, dedicated to St Faith, is mediaeval with heavy 19th-century restoration. Hexton Manor in its extensive park dates from at least the 15th century, although it was substantially altered in 1901.

The village was owned by the de Lautour family who lived at the Manor and were descendants of the French Dukes of Bouillon. The manor and estate was then passed on to Major Sir Patrick Ashley Cooper, and since sold more than once.

Hexton Chalk Pit is a nature reserve managed by the Herts and Middlesex Wildlife Trust.

== Ravensburgh Castle ==
Far older is the Iron Age camp of Ravensburgh Castle, a scheduled monument which straddles a hilltop a mile to the south-west. Limited excavations during the 1960s showed that it was built about 400 BC. and refortified around 50 BC. Rectangular in shape, and enclosing nine hectares, it is strongly defended by a double rampart and ditch on the north, west and south sides, with a more massive rampart on the vulnerable eastern flank. Of its two entrances, that at the northwest corner belongs to the original build, whilst the southeastern entrance was added around 50 BC. A gap halfway along the eastern side is modern.

It has been suggested that Ravensburgh might have been the headquarters of the Celtic chieftain Cassivelaunus, attacked in 54 BC. The excavations showed signs of burning on the eastern rampart. Access to the site is strictly limited. Finds of pottery and a bird-headed weaving comb are in the Stockwood Discovery Centre, Luton.

== Governance ==
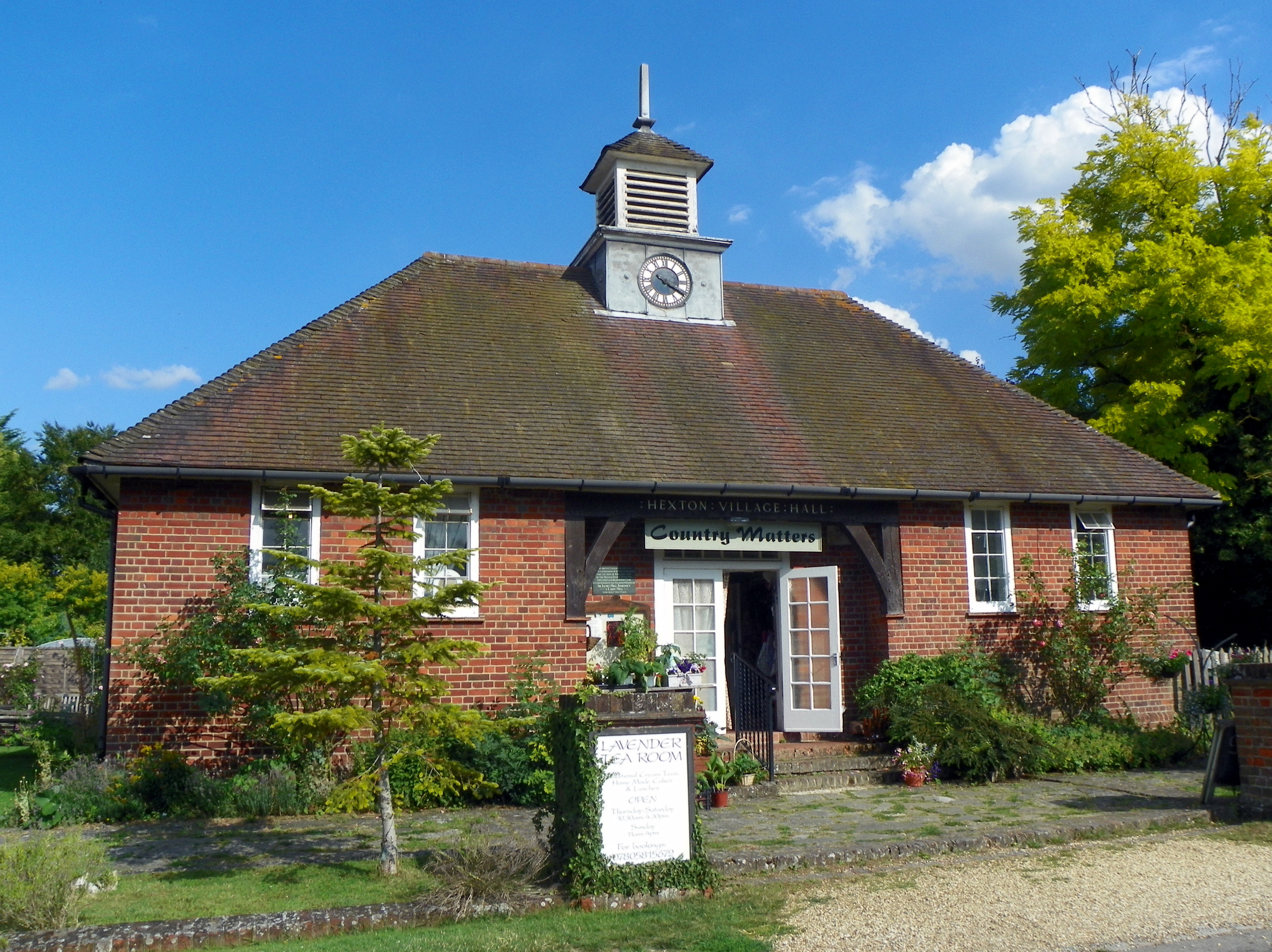
Village Hall

There are two elected tiers of local government covering Hexton, at district and county level: North Hertfordshire District Council and Hertfordshire County Council. Due to its low population, Hexton has a parish meeting comprising all residents instead of an elected parish council.
