= Keate baronets =

Extinct baronetcy in the Baronetage of England

- Escutcheon of the Keate baronets of The Hoo
- Creation date: 1660
- Status: extinct
- Extinction date: 1757
- Arms: argent, three mountain cats passant in pale sable

The Keate Baronetcy, of The Hoo in the County of Hertford, was a title in the Baronetage of England. It was created on 12 June 1660 for Jonathan Keate, subsequently Member of Parliament for Hertfordshire. The title became extinct on the death of the fourth Baronet in 1757.

== Keate baronets, of The Hoo (1660) ==
- Sir Jonathan Keate, 1st Baronet (1633–1700), High Sheriff of Hertfordshire in 1666
- Sir Gilbert Hoo Keate, 2nd Baronet (c. 1661–1705)
- Sir Henry Hoo Keate, 3rd Baronet (c.1696–1744)
- Sir William Keate, 4th Baronet (c.1700–1757)
