= Hexton Manor =

Country house in Hertfordshire, England

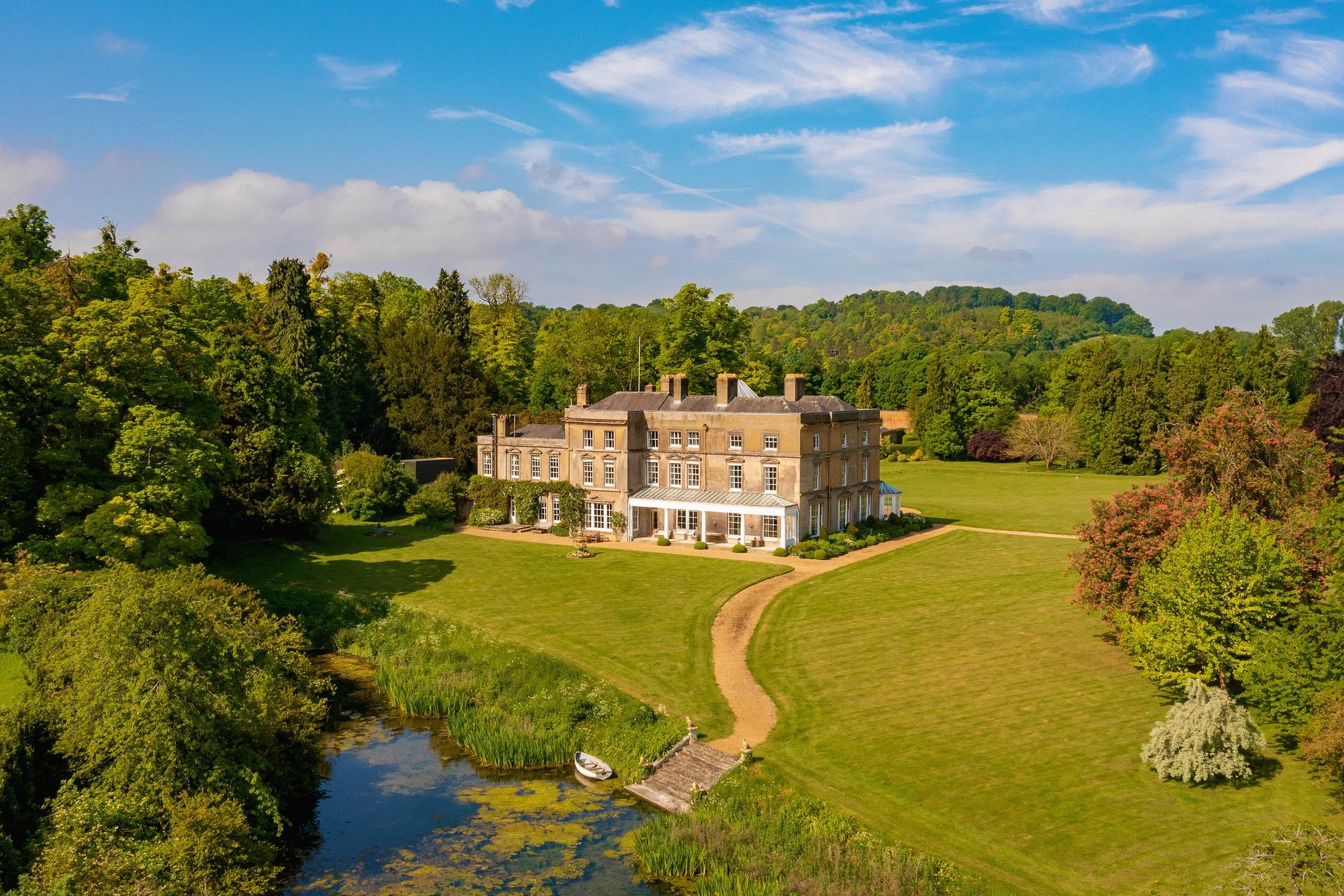
- Hexton Manor 2022
- Interactive map of the Hexton Manor area

General information
- Type: Manor house
- Location: Hexton, Hertfordshire, England
- Coordinates: 51.9617°N 0.3886°W
- Completed: c. 17th century
- Renovated: 1820
- Owner: Cooper Family

Technical details
- Floor count: 3
- Floor area: 14,589 sq ft (1,355.4 m^{2})

Listed Building – Grade II

Hexton Manor is a country house in Hexton, Hertfordshire that has been home to the Lautour family, descendants of the Dukes of Bouillon and Major Sir Patrick Ashley Cooper.

== History ==
Hexton, the land where the manor stands, has been settled and its land has been cultivated for over 5000 years. The Hexton Manor is neighbours with the Ravensburgh Castle (a pre-Roman fortified settlement) to its west. The Manor of Hexton started as part of the estate of St Albans Abbey until the dissolution of the monasteries in 1541 at which point it was given away from the church. The estate was owned by seventeen different families although it ended up with the Poyntz family under Newdigate Poyntz.

Hexton Manor started as a farmhouse in the 17th century, although was enlarged into a manor house in the 18th century. In 1820 the then owner, Joseph Andrew de Lautour and his wife Caroline Young de Lautour enlarged the house further. De Lautour inherited the property through his wife Caroline Young who was the daughter of William Young, the illegitimate child of Patrick Murray, 5th Lord Elibank who had priorly owned the Hexton Estate. The manor remained in the de Lautour family until it was purchased by George Hodgson, a rich textile merchant, in 1901 who enlarged and rebuilt it into its current form. Hodgson later sold the house to the businessman and politician Sir Patrick Ashley Cooper in 1918. Whilst owning the estate, Patrick Ashley Cooper served as High Sheriff of Hertfordshire and Deputy Lieutenant of Hertfordshire.

The Hexton Manor was initially put up for sale in 2018 via the estate agents, Savills for a guide price of £18.5 Million. It was again put on the market in 2022 again via Savills, this time for £15 Million and was later in the year listed on Knight Frank estate agents as well.

North Herts Council has granted conditional listed building consent in 2025 for internal alternation to the Hexton Manor. the council has agreed upon the following alterations: Creating a wine room, installing plumbing, renovating the timber panelling in the dining room and the hall, installing trench heaters in the ground floor, adding underfloor heating system, and electrical works on the first and second floor.
