= History of Hertfordshire =

History of English county

Ancient extent of Hertfordshire

The history of Hertfordshire includes such a number of events of primary importance that it is somewhat difficult to make a selection of those most fitted to appear in the limited space available.

— Richard Lydekker, author of Hertfordshire, writing in 1909.

Hertfordshire is an English county, founded in the Norse–Saxon wars of the 9th century, and developed through commerce serving London. It is a land-locked county that was several times the seat of Parliament. From origins in brewing and papermaking, through aircraft manufacture, the county has developed a wider range of industry in which pharmaceuticals, financial services and film-making are prominent. Today, with a population slightly over 1 million, Hertfordshire services, industry and commerce dominate the economy, with fewer than 2000 people working in agriculture, forestry and fishing.

Hertfordshire is one of the historic counties of England first recorded in the early 10th century. Its development has been tied with that of London, which lies on its southern border. London is the largest city in Western Europe; it requires an enormous tonnage of supplies each day and Hertfordshire grew wealthy on the proceeds of trade because no less than three of the old Roman roads serving the capital run through it, as do the Grand Union Canal and other watercourses. In the 19th century, rail links sprang up in the county, linking London to the north. Hatfield in Hertfordshire has seen two rail crashes of international importance (in 1870 and 2000).

Though nowadays Hertfordshire tends to be politically conservative, historically it was the site of a number of uprisings against the Crown, particularly in the First Barons' War, the Peasants' Revolt, the Wars of the Roses and the English Civil War. The county has a rich intellectual history, and many writers of major importance, from Geoffrey Chaucer to Beatrix Potter, have connections there. Quite a number of prime ministers were born or grew up in Hertfordshire.

The county contains a curiously large number of abandoned settlements, which K. Rutherford Davis attributes to a mixture of poor harvests on soil hard to farm, and the Black Death which ravaged Hertfordshire starting in 1349.

== Early history ==
The earliest evidence of human occupation in Hertfordshire come from a gravel pit in Rickmansworth. The finds (of flint tools) date back 350,000 years, long before Britain became an island.

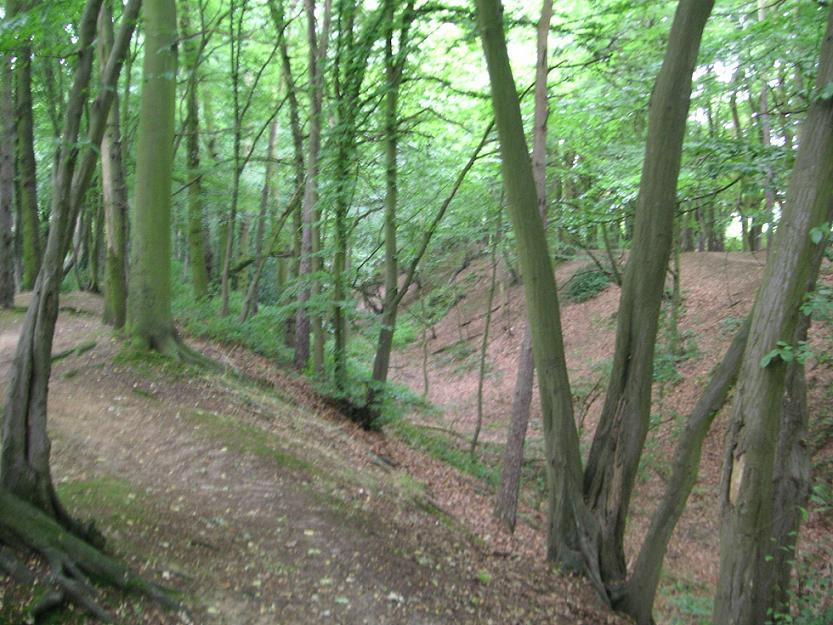
Beech Bottom Dyke constructed at the end of the Iron Age

People have probably lived in the land now called Hertfordshire for about 12,000 years, since the Mesolithic period in Ware (making Ware one of the oldest continuously occupied sites in Europe). Settlement continued through the Neolithic period, with evidence of occupation sites, enclosures, long barrows and even an unusual dog cemetery in the region. Although occupied, the area had a relatively low population in the Neolithic and early Bronze Age, perhaps because of its heavy, relatively poorly drained soil. Nevertheless, just south of present-day Ware and Hertford there is some evidence of an increase in the population, with typical round huts and farming activity having been found at a site called Foxholes Farm. There is no evidence of settlement at Hertford itself from this period, although Ware and perhaps Hertford seem to have been occupied during Roman times.

In the Iron Age, a Celtic tribe called the Catuvellauni occupied Hertfordshire. Their main settlement (or oppidum) was Verlamion on the River Ver (near present-day St Albans). Other oppida in Hertfordshire include sites at Cow Roast near Tring, Wheathampstead, Welwyn, Braughing, and Baldock. Hertfordshire contains several Iron Age hill forts, including the largest example in Eastern England at Ravensburgh Castle in Hexton.

There is a wealth of Iron Age burial sites in Hertfordshire, making it a place of international importance in Iron Age study. The large number of sites of all types indicates dense and complex settlement patterns immediately prior to the Roman invasion.

=== The Roman Invasion of Britain ===
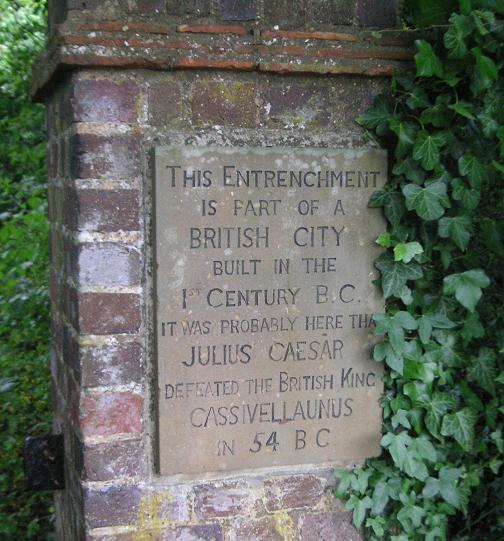
The Devil's Dyke, probably the site of Caesar's defeat of the Catuvellauni

In 55 BCE when the Romans first attempted to invade Britain, the Catuvellauni (which is Brythonic for "Expert Warrior") were the largest British tribe. Caesar's report to the Senate said that "Cassivellaun" (Cassivellaunus) was leader of the Britons, and Cassivellaunus' headquarters were near Wheathampstead in Hertfordshire. On Caesar's second invasion attempt in 54 BCE, Cassivellaunus led the British defensive forces. The Romans besieged him at Wheathampstead, and partly because of the defection of the Trinovantes (whose King Cassivellaunus had had murdered), the Catuvellauni were forced to surrender. However, after the siege of Wheathampstead, Caesar returned to Rome without leaving a garrison.

Cunobelinus became king of the Catuvellauni in 9 or 10 CE and ruled for about thirty years, conquering such a large area of Britain that the Roman writer Suetonius called him Britannorum Rex ((in Latin) "King of Britain"). He built Beech Bottom Dyke, a defensive earthwork, at St Albans, which may be related to another Iron Age defensive earthwork, the Devil's Dyke, at Cassivellaunus' headquarters in nearby Wheathampstead. The Romans defeated the Catuvellauni again in July 43 CE and this time, garrisoned Britain. When the Romans took over, their settlement, laid out in 49 CE, became known as Verulamium. Alban, a Roman army officer who became Britain's first Christian martyr after his arrest at Chantry Island, died in the 3rd or 4th century and gave his name to the modern town of St Albans. Verulamium became one of Roman Britain's major cities, the third-largest and the only to be granted self-governing status. Strong though Verulamium's defences may have been, they were not enough to stop Boudica, who burned the city in 61 CE. Verulamium was rebuilt, with defences enclosing a site of some 81 hectares (200 acres) and was occupied into the 5th century.

A number of Roman Roads run through Hertfordshire including Watling Street and Ermine Street. The ancient trackway, the Icknield Way also runs through Hertfordshire. These are three of the "four highways" of medieval England (the other being the Fosse Way, which does not run through Hertfordshire) which were still the main routes through the country more than a thousand years later. The first Roman Road to be built was the Military Way, constructed very early in the Roman conquest to speed the troops' access north. Later, Ermine Street would be built directly on top of it.

=== Hertfordshire in the Early Middle Ages ===
After the Anglo-Saxon invasion of Britain, the Hertfordshire area formed parts of the Kingdom of Mercia and the Kingdom of Essex. The main early Saxon tribes there seem to have been the Hicce, Brahhingas and Wæclingas. Place names tend to derive from Celtic rather than Saxon, and there is a "singular lack of Early Saxon place names." The Synod of Hertford, which was the first national Synod of the English Church, took place on 26 September 672–3. (Note: The date given varies from source to source; it is variously given as 24 September 673, 26 September 673, and sometimes 672. In the "26 September 672-3" phrasing, this article follows Robinson. While most sources indicate that "Herutford" meant Hertford, it is also quite possible that Hartford, Huntingdonshire was meant.) It was at this Synod that the "question of Easter" was settled, and the church agreed how to calculate the date of Easter. The Synod also marked the end of the conflict between the Celtic Church and the Romanised church introduced by Saint Augustine.

King Offa of Mercia (died 796) built a church at Hitchin in Hertfordshire, but it burned down in 910 CE and the monks moved to St Albans. Offa defeated Beornred of Mercia at Pirton, near Hitchin and gave his name to the village of Offley ("Offa's Lea"). Some sources (including Matthew Paris, who was a monk at St Albans) suggest he died at Offley, though he was buried fifteen miles away in Bedford. One of Offa's last acts was to found St Albans Abbey.

=== Origins of the county ===
Great Britain c. 800

The word Hertfordshire (Saxon "Heorotfordscir" or "Heorotfordscír") is attested from 866. The first reference (as "Heoroford") in the Anglo-Saxon Chronicle is for 1011, but the county's true origins lie in the 10th century, when Edward the Elder established two burhs in Hertford in 912 and 913 respectively. (Note: Page (1959) gives these dates as 913 and 914 respectively. Williamson (2000) notes that it is unusual to have two burhs in one town, and offers various speculations about the possible reasons why.) Hertfordshire did not exist in any practical sense in the late 9th century. In the war between Saxon and Norseman, Hertfordshire was on the front line. When, after the Saxon victory in the Battle of Ethandun in 878, the Saxon King Alfred the Great and Norse King Guthrum the Old agreed to partition England between them, the dividing line between their territories split what was to become Hertfordshire almost through the middle, along the line of the River Lea and then along Watling Street. Their agreement survives in the Treaty of Alfred and Guthrum which establishes the Danelaw's extent. It seems the land now comprising Hertfordshire was then partly in the Kingdom of Essex (nominally under Norse control, though still populated by Saxons) and partly in the Kingdom of Mercia (which remained Saxon). (Note: This is the conventional view. It is only fair to note that Dumville (1992) has a different and more complex view of the division. He sees the eastern side of Hertfordshire as Saxon and the western side as Norse; Williamson (2000) assesses this as persuasive because it solves questions involving place-names, but not without difficulties of its own.)

Alfred was also responsible for building weirs on the River Lea at Hertford (Saxon "Heorotford", ford used by deer) and Ware (Saxon "Waras", weir), presumably to prevent Viking ships coming upriver. King Edgar the Peaceful is credited with making Hertford the capital of the surrounding shire, presumably between 973 and 975 CE.

== Early Middle Ages ==
Alfred died in 899, and his son Edward the Elder worked with Alfred's son-in-law, Æthelred, and daughter, Æthelflæd, to re-take parts of southern England from the Norse. During these campaigns he built the two burhs of Hertford as already noted. Their sites have not been found, and probably lie beneath the streets of Hertford itself. From Hertford, together with Stafford, Tamworth and Witham, Edward and Æthelflæd pushed the Danes back to Northumbria in a series of battles. Anglo-Saxon Hertford is an example of town planning as demonstrated by its organised rectangular grid street pattern.

There is considerable evidence of a mint in Hertford at this period. Edward the Martyr (from 975 to 978), Æthelred the Unready (from 978 to 1016) and Cnut the Great (from 1016 to 1035) all had coins struck there. The mint itself has not been found, but many coins exist. Over 90% of these coins were found on the Continent or in Scandinavia, which may suggest they were used for payment of Danegeld.

The St Brice's Day massacre of 1002 probably started at Welwyn in Hertfordshire. The massacre was to be a slaughter of the Norse in England, including women and children. One of those executed was Gunhilde, the sister of King Sweyn Forkbeard of Denmark. He invaded England next year in retaliation. Forkbeard's assault on England lasted ten years, until 1013, when Æthelred fled to the continent. Forkbeard was crowned King of England on Christmas Day, but only reigned for five weeks before dying. Æthelred returned briefly and unsuccessfully until 1016, at which time he was succeeded by Forkbeard's son Knut, who granted the Royal Manor of Hitchin to his second in command, Earl Tovi.

== High Middle Ages ==
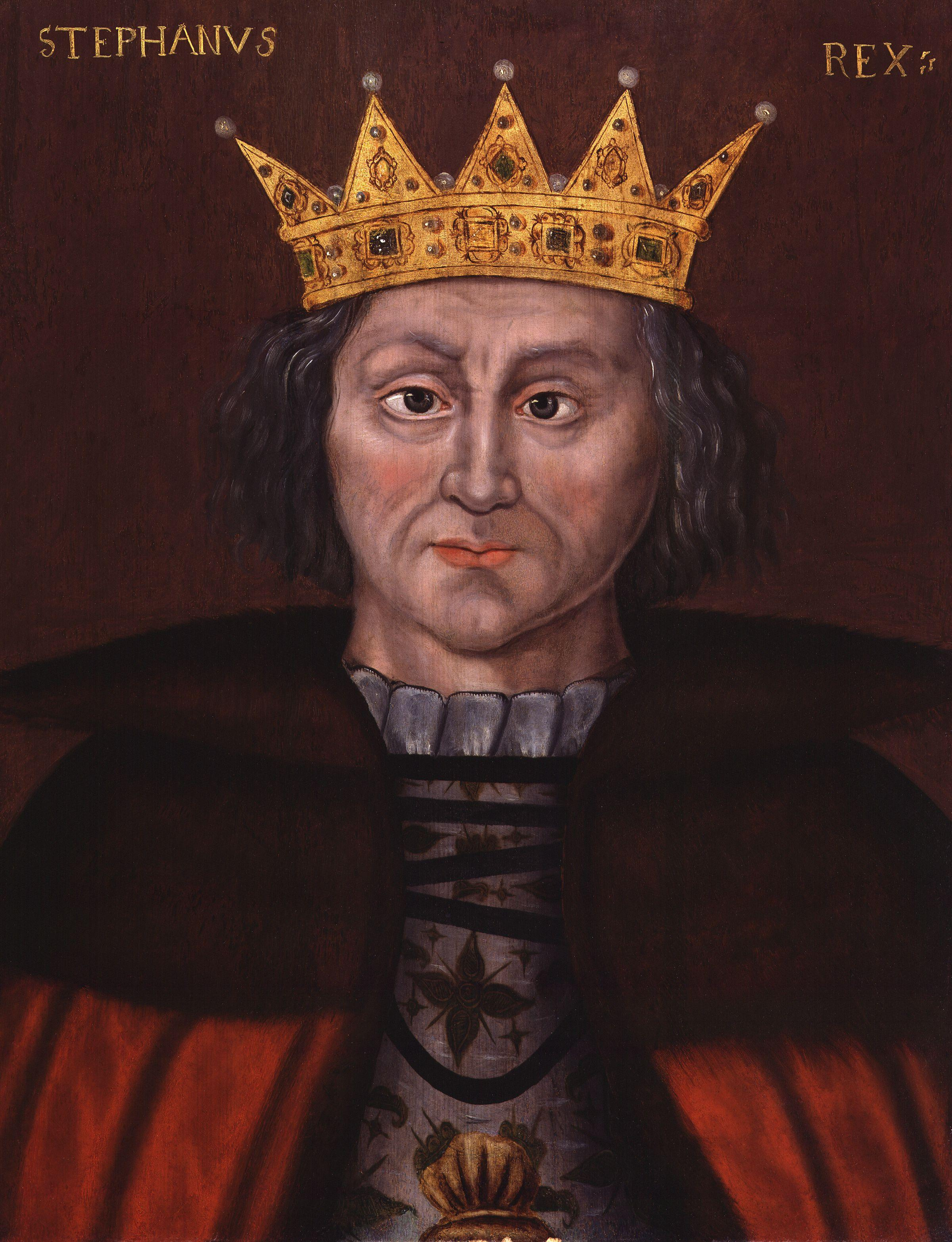
King Stephen, painted around 1620.

After the Norman Invasion, Edgar the Ætheling (the successor to Harold Godwinson) surrendered to William the Conqueror at Berkhamsted. (Note: Most Sources regard Berkhamsted as the place where this event took at, though a minority favour Little Berkhamsted, east of Hatfield.) William created the manor of Berkhamsted, and bestowed it on Count Robert of Mortain, who was his half-brother. From Robert's son William de Mortain it passed to King Henry I, and is still owned by the royal family. Henry held court there in 1123.

The Domesday Book, completed in 1086, lists 168 settlements in Hertfordshire. Hertfordshire's population grew quickly from then until the Black Death reached the county in 1349. The Norman church at St Albans Abbey was finished in 1088.

Hertfordshire had a conflicted relationship with the King during the High Middle Ages. Like most counties in the south-east, most of Hertfordshire was in private (i.e. non-royal) ownership during the High Middle Ages. Royal land comprised about 7% of the county's area. The first Earl of Hertford, Gilbert de Clare, was so titled in 1138. He bore one of the first two sets of heraldic arms in England: three gold chevrons on a red shield. His grandson Richard de Clare once offered King John £100 in respect of legal proceedings concerning his inheritance, but then during the First Barons War he sided with the Barons against the King. Richard became one of the twenty-five Barons sworn to enforce Magna Carta, for which he was excommunicated in 1215.

Thomas Becket, who became Archbishop of Canterbury in 1161, held the honour of Berkhamsted Castle from 1155 until 1163. King Henry II celebrated Christmas there in 1163.

Around this time, motte-and-bailey castles were built in Great Wymondley, Pirton and Therfield. Watford was founded in the 12th century, probably as a result of a market and church set up there by the Abbot of St Albans. In 1130, the earliest Pipe Roll shows that King Henry I's Queen Consort Adeliza owned property in the county.

The first draft of Magna Carta was written at St Albans Abbey in 1213. It contained significant provisions still in force to this day, including the principle of habeas corpus (which was first invoked in court in 1305). Two years later, King John was in St Albans when he learned of the Archbishop of Canterbury's suspension. Though John agreed to Magna Carta, he did not adhere to it, and Hertfordshire was the main battlefield in the civil war that followed. On 16 December 1216, during the First Barons' War, Hertford Castle surrendered after a siege from Dauphin Louis (later Louis VIII of France), whom the English barons had invited to England to replace John as King. Berkhamsted Castle surrendered around the same time.

In winter 1217, royalist forces plundered St Albans, took captives and extorted £100 from the Abbot, who feared the abbey would be burned.

In 1261 King Henry III held parliament in the county. In 1295, another parliament was held in St Albans, and in 1299, King Edward I gave Hertford Castle to his wife Margaret of France on her wedding day.

Hertfordshire is largely on a clay sub-soil, and much of its land, though rich, is "heavy" and not well-suited to crop cultivation with a medieval plough. However, the county did grow good barley which later became important for the brewing trade. Hertfordshire developed more through commerce than through agriculture which drove most of England's economy during this period.

In the High Middle Ages, the county was relatively urbanised by medieval standards, but because towns follow roads and Hertfordshire had many small roads rather than a few large ones, there was no large conurbation. (Note: St Albans is technically a city, but important though it was (and is), it has never been large.)

Commerce grew in Hertfordshire from the start of the 12th century; the number of markets and fairs rose steadily from about 1100 until the Black Death. (Note: Sixteen new markets were created between 1100 and 1200, and a further 19 appeared between 1200 and 1350. About a third of these had disappeared by 1500.) During the 13th century, Hertfordshire's commerce grew still further. The county traded in butter and cheese, and to a lesser extent meat, hides and leather. Much of this produce was bound for London. The county also developed its inns and other services for travellers to and from London.

The Knights Templar built Baldock, starting around 1140. In 1185, a survey of the Knights' holdings showed Baldock had 122 tenants on 150 acres (0.61 km^{2}) of land and several skilled craftsmen. King John granted the Knights a fair and market at Baldock in 1199, to be held annually. It began on St Matthew's Day and lasted five days in all. At around the same time, the leatherworking trade was prominent in Hitchin.

=== An English pope ===
Nicholas Breakspear, the only Englishman ever to have been elected Pope, was born on a farm in Bedmond or Abbots Langley in Hertfordshire, probably around 1100. He was baptised in Abbots Langley. Nicholas was refused permission to become a monk at St Albans, but his career does not seem to have suffered for this, and he was unanimously elected Pope on 2 December 1154, taking the papal name Adrian IV. He died in 1159. He was the Pope who placed Rome under an interdict, and is famous for his alleged Donation of Ireland to the English throne.

== Late Middle Ages ==
In 1302, King Edward I granted Kings Langley to the Prince of Wales. King Edward II's "favourite", Piers Gaveston, loved the palace at Kings Langley and he was buried there after his death in 1312. Edmund of Langley, 1st Duke of York and founder of the House of York, was born in Kings Langley on 5 June 1341 and died there on 1 August 1402.

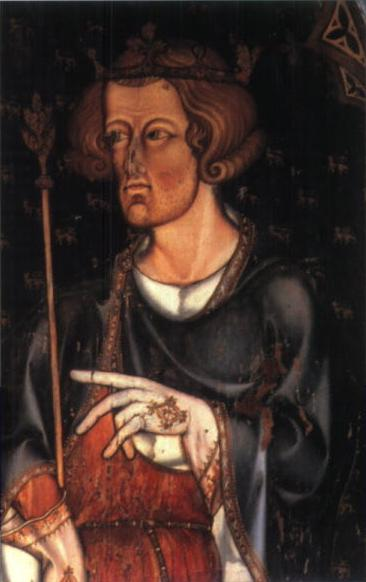
King Edward I

Richard of Wallingford, the mathematician and astronomer, became Abbot of St Albans in 1326. He is regarded as the father of modern trigonometry.

Hertford Castle was used as a gaol for a series of important captives during the Hundred Years' War. This was actually a series of separate wars that lasted a total of 116 years, between 1337 and 1453. The Plantagenet kings of England fought the Valois kings of France, almost entirely on French soil. Queen Isabella was imprisoned by her son, the King, in Hertford Castle in 1330, (Note: She died at Hertford Castle in 1358.) as were King David II of Scotland and his queen in 1346, after the Battle of Neville's Cross. King John II of France was imprisoned there in 1359 in considerable luxury.

The Black Death midway through the 14th century massively reduced Hertfordshire's population. The number of residents probably fell by 30%–50%, and likely took until the 16th century to recover. This meant many of the settlements in Hertfordshire were abandoned, particularly in the north and east of the county where farm yields were poor. Near Tring, a cluster of deserted medieval villages can still be seen. However, the residents who survived grew richer. The reduced population meant workers could demand higher wages and better conditions, despite laws such as the Ordinance of Labourers of 1349 and the Statute of Labourers of 1351. These changed economic conditions contributed to the Peasants' Revolt in 1381, in which Hertfordshire's people were deeply involved. (Perhaps confusingly, another man called Richard of Wallingford was one of revolt leader Wat Tyler's principal allies. This is not the same man as the Abbot of St Albans.)

After Wat Tyler had been caught and executed, King Richard II went to St Albans to quell the rebels. Richard's body was buried at Kings Langley church in Hertfordshire in 1400, but he was moved to Westminster Abbey in 1413, next to his wife Anne. That same year, King Henry IV appointed his knight Hugh de Waterton to Berkhamsted Castle to supervise his children John and Philippa.

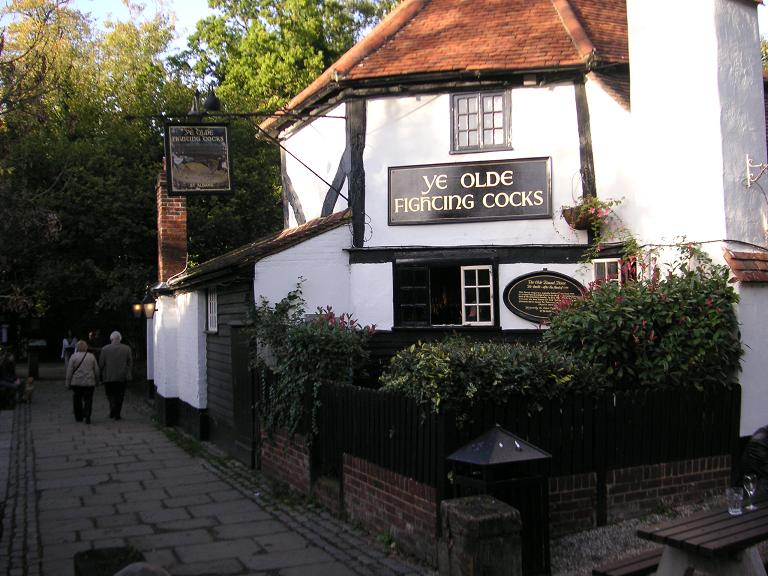
Ye Olde Fighting Cocks, a fifteenth-century public house in St Albans

King Henry IV moved his government temporarily to St Albans early in his reign for fear of public opinion in London. He gave the castle and honour of Hertford to Edmund, Earl of Stafford, and his wife Anne. Edmund was killed at the Battle of Shrewsbury in 1403. King Henry V married Catherine of France on 2 June 1420, and gave Hertford Castle to her.

In 1413, King Henry V kept Easter at Kings Langley. He gave the alm of a groat to the poor. Henry Chichele, the Archbishop of Canterbury, visited Barnet in 1423. No bells rang, and the archbishop took offence at his poor welcome. When he returned in 1426, the church doors were sealed against him.

Three important battles of the Wars of the Roses took place in Hertfordshire. At the First Battle of St Albans on 22 May 1455, which was the first major battle of the Wars of the Roses, Richard of York and Neville the Kingmaker defeated the Lancastrians, killed their leader, Edmund Beaufort and captured King Henry VI. The Lancastrians recaptured the King at the Second Battle of St Albans on 12 February 1461. While he was a prisoner of the Yorkists, in 1459, Henry VI kept Easter at St Albans Abbey. He gave his best gown to the prior, but the gift seems to have been regretted and the treasurer later bought it back for fifty marks.

The Battle of Barnet took place on 14 April 1471. Neville the Kingmaker advanced on London. He camped on Hadley Green, and King Edward IV's army met him there. After confusion in the early morning mist, in which the Lancastrians seem to have ended up fighting each other, the Yorkists won the battle. The Kingmaker was captured and executed, and Edward's authority was never again seriously challenged.

England's oldest surviving pub is in Hertfordshire and dates to this period. Ye Olde Fighting Cocks, (Note: That is to say, England's oldest pub according to the Guinness Book of Records. The matter is disputed.) which is in St Albans, was rebuilt in 1485. Some of the foundation stones are even older, allegedly going back to the 8th century.

First English paper and printing industry

One of the first three printing presses in England was in St Albans. England's first paper mill, which was the property of John Tate, stood in Hertford opposite today's County Hospital from 1494; visited by Henry VII twice and producing a star and circle watermark on some versions of the papal bull recognising his right to reign over England.

== Renaissance ==
The long Elizabethan peace, and turmoil in Europe, conspired to raise English commercial power during the Renaissance. European refugees also contributed to English wealth. London was the centre of this new power, and Hertfordshire's commerce benefited accordingly.

In November 1524, Catherine of Aragon held court at Hertford Castle. On 3 May 1547, King Edward VI granted his sister Princess Mary the manor and castle of Hertford, tolls from the bridge at Ware, and the manor of Hertingfordbury.

Under Mary, who as Queen earned the sobriquet "Bloody Mary", three "heretics" (that is, Protestants who refused to become catholic) were burnt at the stake in Hertfordshire. William Hale, Thomas Fust, and George Tankerville, were executed at Barnet, Ware, and St Albans respectively. In 1554, Queen Mary granted the town of Hertford its first charter for a fee of thirteen shillings and fourpence, due annually at Michaelmas.

Queen Elizabeth I lived at Hatfield Palace near Hatfield as a girl. When plague ravaged London, she held parliaments at Hertford Castle in 1564 and 1581. The law courts moved to St Albans for the same reason. During her reign, Hertfordshire was specifically commended for its soldiers' efficiency. In the mobilisation of 1588 for the Anglo-Spanish War, the county sent twenty-five lances and sixty light horse to Brentwood, a thousand infantry to Tilbury, a thousand to Stratford-at-Bow, and five hundred to guard Her Majesty's person. The Arms of Hertfordshire were granted next year. In 1602 founder of Hartford (Connecticut), Samuel Stone was born in Fore Street, Hertford.

...a county every where abounding with fertile fields, fat pastures, shady groves and pleasant rivolets.

— James Brome, writing in 1700.

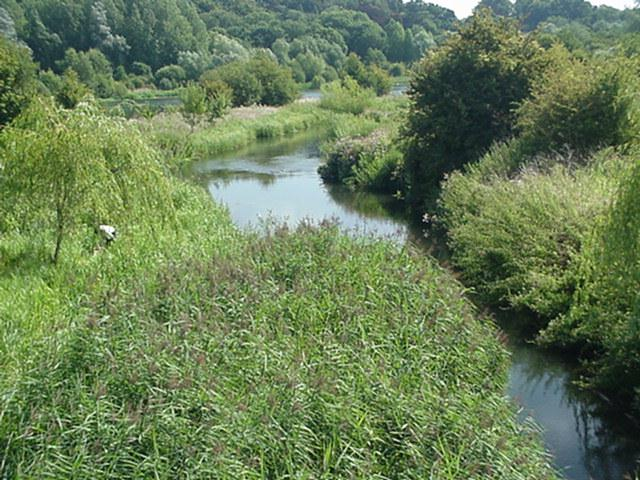
The River Lea at Great Amwell

King James I was often in Hertfordshire and had several works carried out in the county. He built Theobalds Park, enclosing a large tract of southern Hertfordshire in a wall. (Note: By 1621, the estate included 117 acres of arable land, 99 of meadow, 86 of woodland and 82 of pasture. Over nine miles of brick wall were built around it all.) Parts of the wall still exist. He also had a hand in creating the New River, which was the brainchild of Welsh entrepreneur, Hugh Myddelton: an artificial watercourse that predated the building of England's canal network by over a century.

James I, who was a confirmed dog-lover, also built a huge kennel (about 46 feet (14 m) long) and dog-yard (over half an acre in size) at Royston. He seems to have loved Royston and spent considerable time there, hunting and feasting and enjoying himself—so much so that his favourite dog, Jowler, returned one evening with a note tied to his collar. The note read: "Good Mr Jowler, we pray you to speak to the King (for he hears you every day and so he doth not us) that it will please His Majesty to go back to London, for else the country will be undone; all our provision is spent already and we are not able to entertain him longer."

During the civil war, the county was mainly parliamentarian. St Albans was an especially staunch parliamentary stronghold. In the course of this war, deserters and mutineers among the various encamped armies ravaged the Chilterns, plundered Ashridge, rifled Little Gaddesden Church and broke open its tombs. In 1645, a dozen men of Oliver Cromwell's New Model Army were hanged for outrages against the people of the county.

In 1647, the parliamentary army, still unpaid after their victory in the First English Civil War, camped on Thriploe Heath near Royston. They wrote to Parliament demanding their pay. This led to a clash between Cromwell's army and the Levellers at Cockbush Field, near Ware, on 15 November 1647. Cromwell captured and imprisoned the Levellers' "agitators" and a number were sentenced to death, though only one was actually executed.

After the Great Fire of London, many children were sent to Hertfordshire: 62 were sent to Ware, and 56 to Hertford. A few years later the mayor and people of Hertford petitioned King Charles II to confirm, amend and expand the town's charters. Enquiries were made as to whether anyone would object, and three prominent men did, but the attorney general dismissed their objections on grounds of malice in 1680. The town henceforth had its own coroner, who doubled as the town clerk, and both the court-day and market-day were changed so as not to coincide with nearby markets at Ware, Hoddesdon or Hatfield.

In 1683, there was a plot to assassinate Charles II and his brother as he passed through Rye House in Hertfordshire. Unfortunately for the plotters, the royal party was early, so the opportunity was missed; when the plot was discovered, it became a pretext for a purge of the Whig leaders.

== Modern era ==
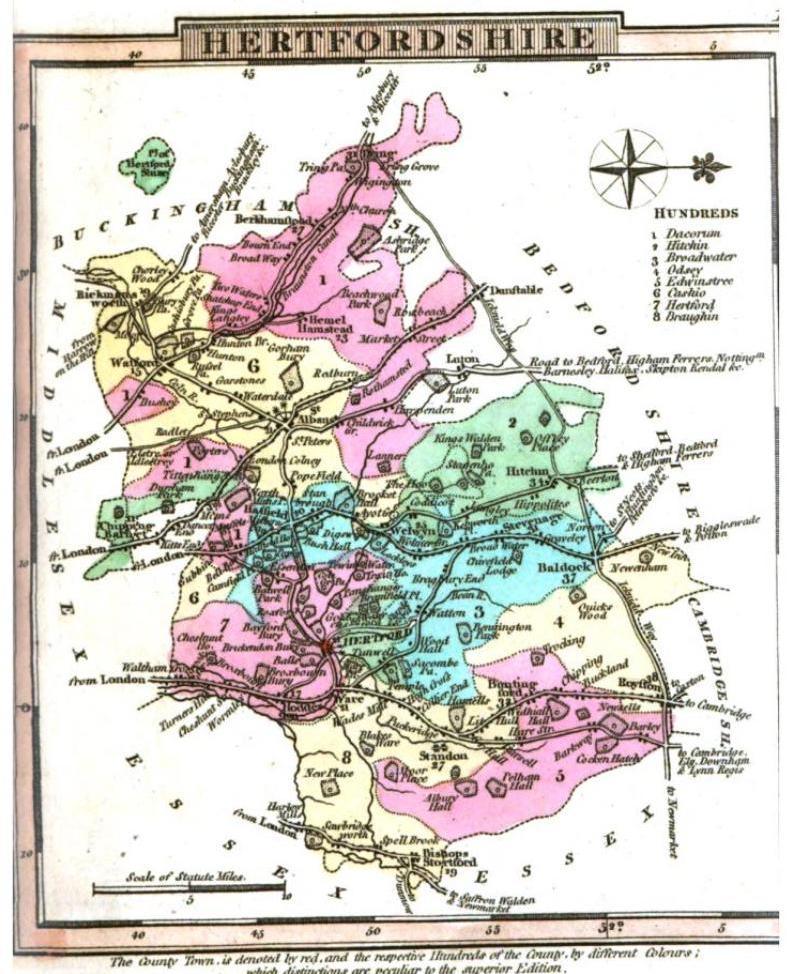
Map of Hertfordshire (with north to the right) in Gray's Book of Roads, George Carrington Gray (1824)

In the last two centuries, Hertfordshire's population has multiplied tenfold. Around the end of the 18th century, its population was around 95,000. In 1821, it was just under 130,000. In 1881 it was just over 203,000, and by 1921 it was just over 333,000. By the 2001 census, it was 1,033,977. During the 18th century brewing became an important industry in Hertfordshire.

Smallpox broke out in Hertford gaol in 1729, and spread into the town. The next year, smallpox hit Hitchin, killing 158 people. The River Lee Navigation Act 1738 (12 Geo. 2. c. 32) led to the river being improved, becoming navigable as far as Ware. Locks were built in Ware, Broxbourne, and "Stanstead" (presumably Stanstead Abbotts rather than Stansted Mountfitchet, which is not on the Lea). By 1797, the Grand Junction Canal (now called the Grand Union Canal) was being cut. Its highest point is the Tring Summit in Hertfordshire, which was formed in 1799. Because a canal barge can hold so much more than a wagon, the waterways expansions increased the quantity of supplies that could reach London (and the amount of refuse and manure that could be carted away).

Mobilisation for the Seven Years' War affected Hertfordshire. In 1756, £350 was paid to the inns and public houses of Ware for the troops staying with them. The next year, Pitt's army reforms made Hertfordshire liable to provide 560 officers and men.

The county also contributed soldiers to the French Revolutionary Wars. On 7 May 1794, lists opened for the Hertfordshire Yeomanry Cavalry Regiment, which comprised five troops of cavalry. The Loyal Hemel Hempstead Volunteers formed in 1797. Two further troops of volunteers were raised in 1798, at Borehamwood and Sawbridgeworth, and the same year, the Hitchin Volunteers were also raised, but their duty was only to defend land within three miles (4.8 km) of Hitchin. (Note: Of those who signed the muster roll for the Hitchin Volunteers between 1803 and 1809, 68% could sign their own name. The recruiting officer put a cross beside the names of those who could not.)

In 1795, a Dr Walker wrote a report on agriculture and forestry in the county. He said "Herts is justly deemed the first and best corn county in the kingdom", an assessment that may not be free from local bias. It nevertheless shows how more advanced farming techniques and soil improvement programmes had enabled farmers to work Hertfordshire's "heavier" soils to better effect since the Saxon–Norse wars.

Thanks to a rapidly increasing population and improved record-keeping practices, the volume of paper records for Hertfordshire in the 19th and 20th centuries is huge. Many of these documents are written or printed on paper made locally, at a time when paper-making joined brewing as another dominant industry in the county.

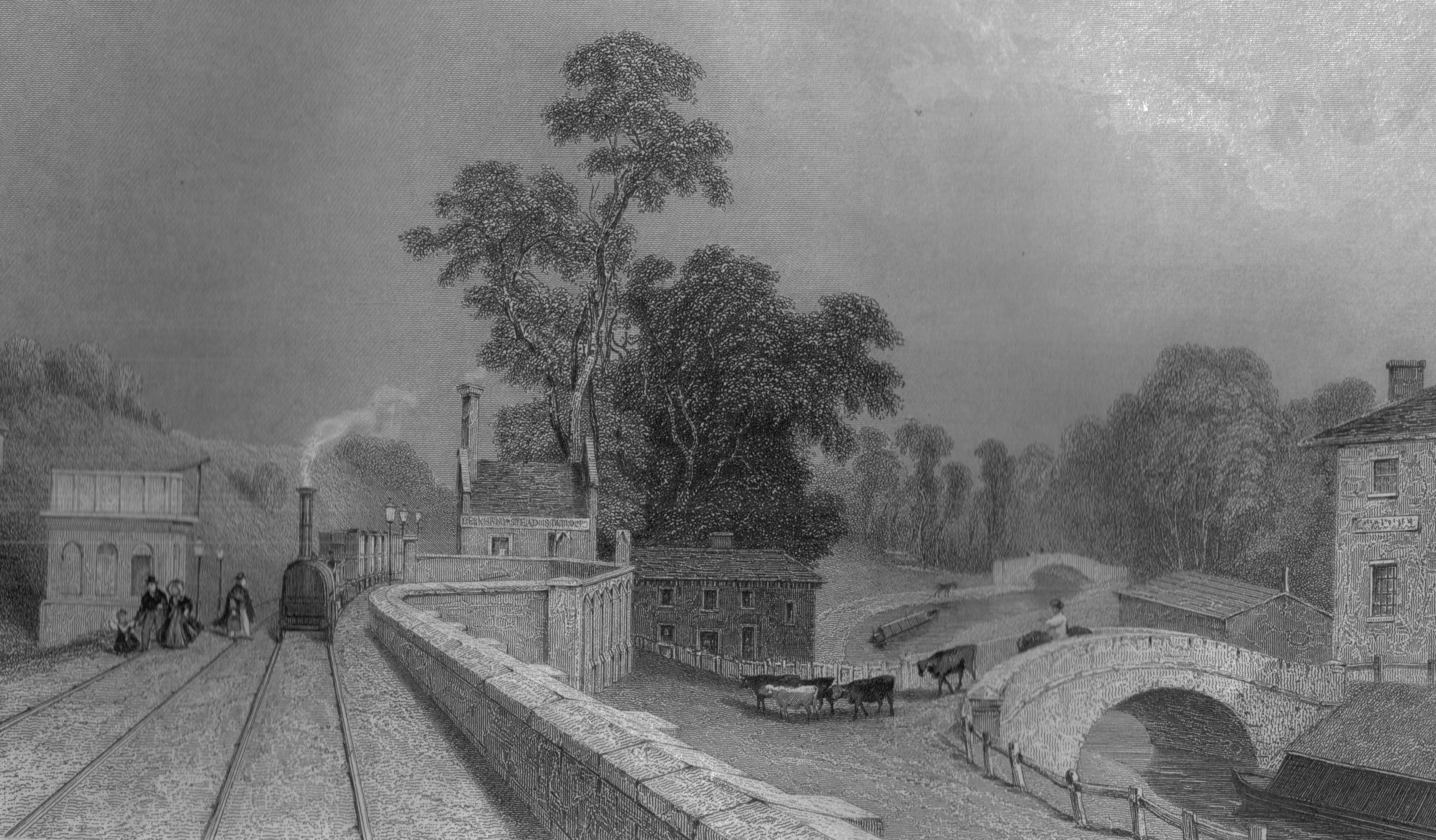
Berkhampstead Railway Station in 1838

In 1809, John Dickinson purchased Apsley Mills in Hemel Hempstead for his newly patented paper-making machine. In a dispute with the Society of Paper-Makers in 1821, he dismissed the men involved and trained replacements. By 1825, Apsley and Nash Mills in Hemel Hempstead were using steam power to produce paper. Dickinson patented his silk threadpaper in 1829, which was used, among other things, for Exchequer Bonds, and had to be made under supervision from two excise men. He built Croxley Mills, near Rickmansworth, in 1830 and Abbots Hill, Nash Mills, in 1836.

In 1840, the Uniform Penny Post came in. Dickinson made paper for the stamps, and also for the Mulready envelopes. He built a private gas works at Apsley in 1851. In March 1886, John Dickinson & Co. Ltd. was incorporated with £500,000 in capital and 10 acres (40,000 m^{2}) of glass houses. By 1900, the company had 264 acres (1.07 km^{2}) of glass houses in the Cheshunt area.

Rothamsted Research, previously known as the Experimental Station and then the Institute of Arable Crops Research, is one of the oldest agricultural research institutions in the world, at its Harpenden site. It was founded by a fertiliser inventor in 1843.

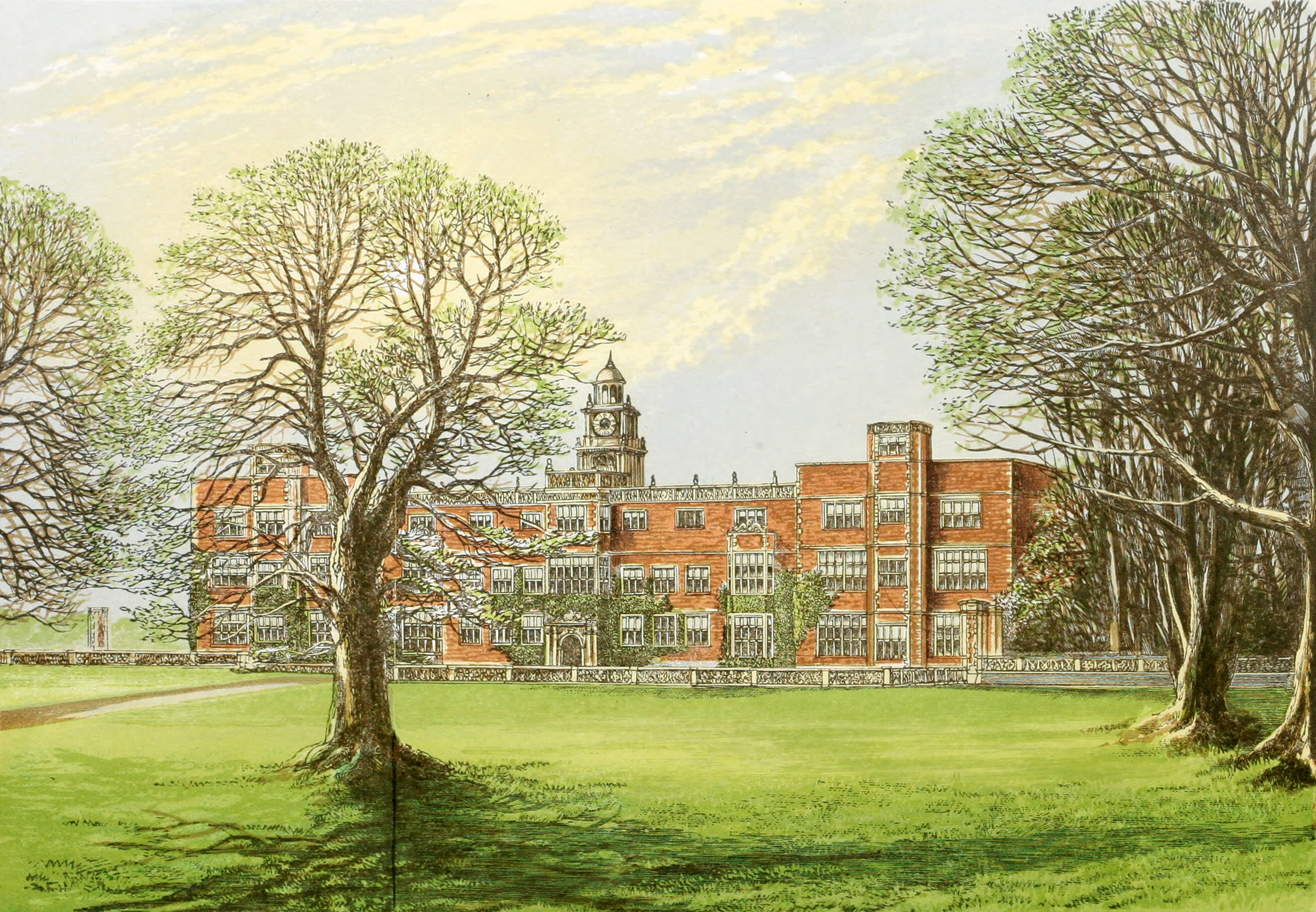
Hatfield House in 1880

The 19th century was also a busy period for the military. Ten corps of Volunteer Infantry were formed in 1803. In 1804, the clock tower in St Albans signalled news of the Battle of Trafalgar by semaphore. The Duke of Wellington earned the freedom of the borough of St Albans after Napoleon's defeat in 1814. The Hertfordshire Regiment became the fourth battalion of the Bedfordshire Regiment in 1891, and in March 1900, the 42nd (Hertfordshire) Company of the Imperial Yeomanry landed at Cape Town. Cecil Rhodes, who founded De Beers and the state of Rhodesia (now Zimbabwe), was born in South Street, Bishops Stortford, in 1853. The house is still standing, and has been adapted into a museum. He spent much of his youth in South Africa, but returned to Bishops Stortford in 1873.

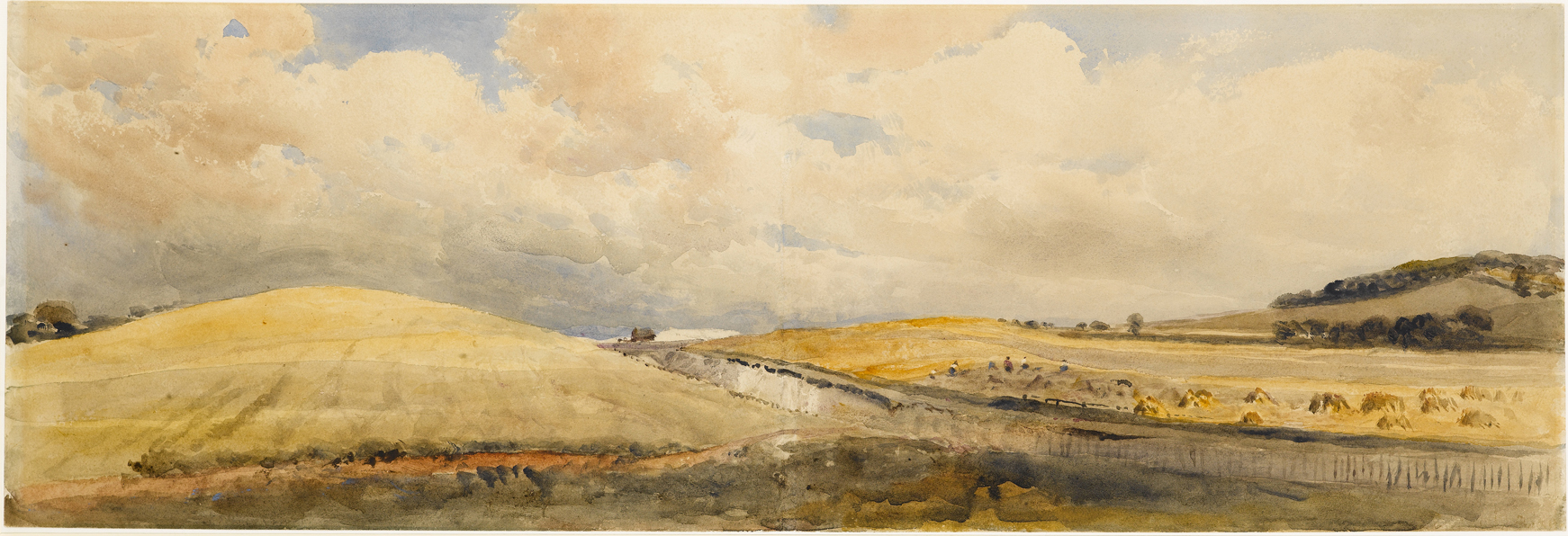
Peter de Wint, Cornfields near Tring Station, Hertfordshire, 1847, Princeton University Art Museum

The first branch railway line in England was the Aylesbury one, which opened in 1839. It had a station in Hertfordshire, at Marston Gate. Another rail line grew out from London towards Cambridge, reaching Broxbourne in 1840, Harlow in 1841, and Bishops Stortford in 1842. A branch to Hertford opened in 1843. The first Hatfield train crash took place on Boxing Day, 1870. The London Underground rail line reached Rickmansworth in 1887.

== Twentieth century ==
=== Pre World War II ===
The two flagship garden cities of Letchworth and Welwyn were central to the development of town planning in England. The first Garden City Company formed in 1903, with £300,000 of capital, and by 1914, Letchworth had a population of around 10,000. Ebenezer Howard bought nearly 1,500 acres (6.1 km^{2}) in 1919, and the first house in Welwyn Garden City was occupied in 1920. The town's official date of founding was 29 April.

In the First World War, the Hertfordshire Yeomanry mobilised in September 1914 and were almost immediately deployed to Egypt. The 2nd London Division of the Territorial Force had their headquarters at St Albans, and the North Midland Territorial Division was billeted there as well. The 1/1st Hertfordshire Regiment landed at Le Havre in November, and saw action in the Ypres Salient that month.

The Hertfordshire Volunteer regiment formed on 15 May 1915. On 13 October of that year, a Zeppelin raid hit North Road in Hertford, destroying houses there. In 1916, the Hertfordshire Regiment was transferred to 39th Division and fought at St Julien. Two Victoria Crosses ("VC") were awarded to Hertfordshire men in 1916: one to Corporal Alfred Alexander Burt and one to Lieutenant William Leefe Robinson, who shot down the first German airship of WWI, a Schutte-Lanz over Cuffley. Second Lieutenant Wulfstan Tempest shot down a Zeppelin on 2 October of that year, and it came down in Potters Bar. The 1st Battalion of the Hertfordshire Regiment fought near Achiet-le-Grant in 1918, and then at the Battle of Havrincourt. It also fought in the advance to Ghissignies. Hertfordshire's last VC of the First World War was awarded in December 1918, after the war had finished: a posthumous VC for Lieutenant Frank Young of Hitchin, who was killed on 18 September 1918, aged 23.

With the outbreak of the Second World War in September 1939, 1st and 2nd Battalions of the Hertfordshire Regiment were mobilised. Together with the 6th Battalion of the Bedfordshire and Hertfordshire Regiment, they made up 162nd Infantry Brigade of the East Anglian Division. Second Battalion would later be at Ver-sur-Mer in Normandy in support of the D-Day landings.

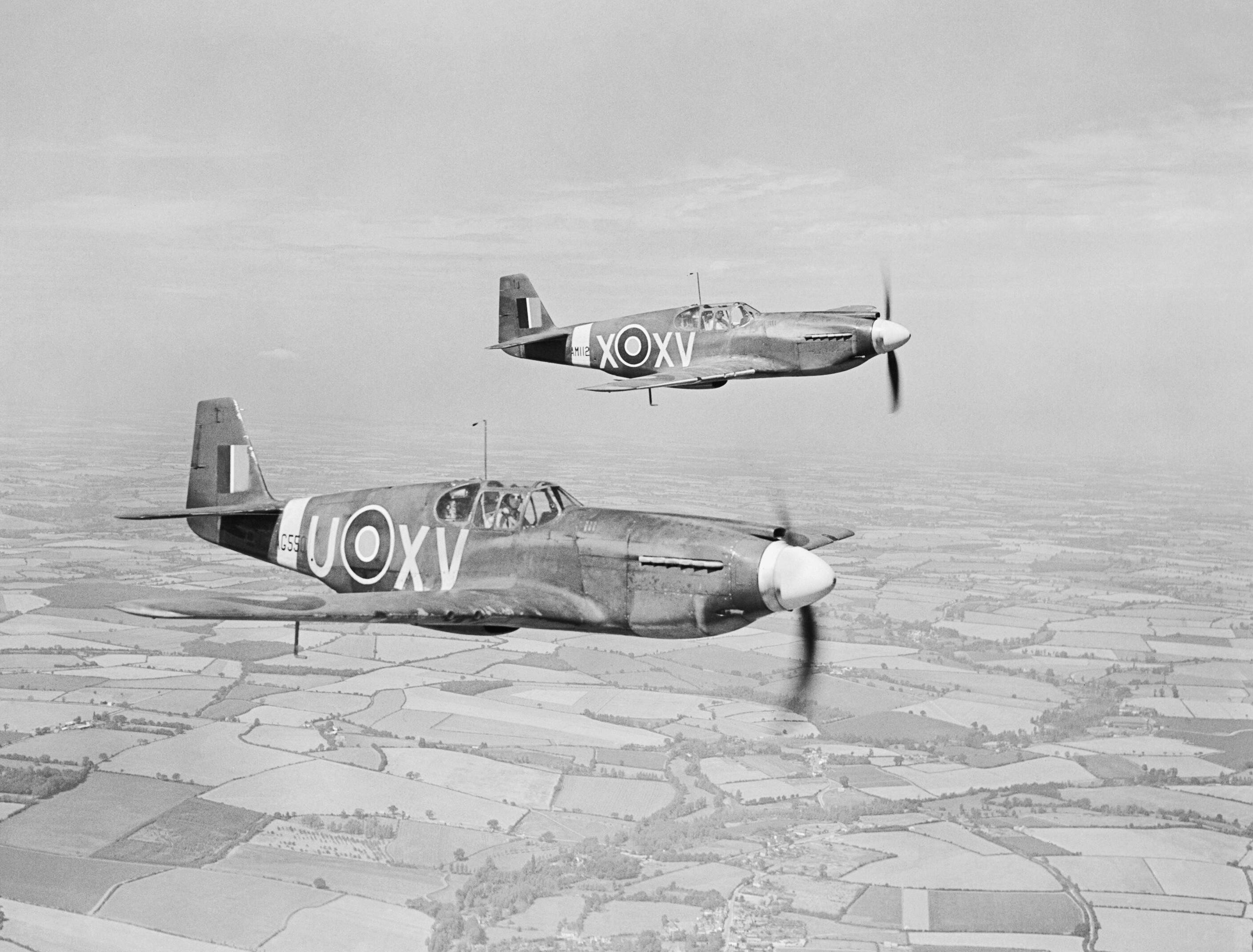
Mustang Is of No. 2 Squadron RAF operating from Sawbridgeworth

In May 1940, a public meeting at County Hall, Hertford (which was then newly built, having only opened in 1939) was held to consider forming the Hertfordshire Local Defence Volunteers. Nineteen companies formed at once. They became the Hertfordshire Home Guard in December of that year.

In 1942 the 191st (Hertfordshire and Essex Yeomanry) Field Regiment, Royal Artillery formed for an anticipated campaign in Northern Europe. Hertfordshire was central to aircraft manufacture in the Second World War. De Havilland designed their Mosquito in Hatfield (Note: They had moved to Hatfield from Edgware in 1933.) and constructed them at Leavesden, together with Halifax bombers.

Many RAF pilots were trained at Panshanger. From 1940, No. 2 (AC) Squadron was stationed at RAF Sawbridgeworth, with the purpose of mounting tactical reconnaissance sorties over occupied Europe. Initially it operated the Westland Lysander, before re-equipping with the more capable Curtiss Tomahawk and North American Mustang aircraft. About 4000 bombs, 107 V-1 flying bombs, and 47 V-2 rockets fell on Hertfordshire during the Second World War. American Flying Fortresses bombers of the 398th Bombardment Group (Heavy) mounting 195 combat missions against targets on the Continent from RAF Nuthampstead. The United States Army Air Forces used RAF Bovingdon as a training station, while the US VIII Fighter Command Headquarters was at RAF Bushey Hall.

=== Post-War ===
After the war, Stevenage was the first town to be redeveloped under the New Towns Act 1946. Hatfield remained closely connected with the aircraft industry, and about 10% of the aircraft workers in England worked in Hertfordshire in the 1960s. The de Havilland Comet was developed in the town. The London Government Act 1963 created an enlarged Greater London in 1965 which took Barnet from Hertfordshire, but in exchange, the county gained Potters Bar and South Mimms from Middlesex. The county's boundaries were revised in the reforms accompanying the Local Government Act 1972, at which time Royston became fully a part of Hertfordshire. Camfield House, Hatfield, belonged to Barbara Cartland during this period, and Beatrix Potter lived there as well. The county's boundaries were revised again in 1993, when Elstree became fully a part of Hertfordshire, gaining some land from Greater London (historically Middlesex).

During the Second World War, sculptor Henry Moore moved to the village of Perry Green in Hertfordshire when his former home was bombed. The Henry Moore Foundation still operates from the village. (Note: In 2005, one of Moore's statues—weighing 2.1 tonnes and worth in excess of £3 million—was stolen from there.)

The character of Hertfordshire changed in the later part of the 20th century. In 1992, it was resolved to close the aircraft manufacturing site in Hatfield. At the start of the 20th century, 83% of the workforce were involved in agriculture, but by the end, less than 1% remained so. Only one brewery, McMullens, is still open and there are no remaining commercial maltings or mills. Nowadays, Hertfordshire has become a service and administrative centre containing the head offices of several important companies (see here) and a dormitory for London. A growing trend is research and development, notably for Glaxo and at the University of Hertfordshire which, from relatively humble beginnings as Hatfield Polytechnic, now has over 23,000 students.

On 17 October 2000, a major rail crash took place in Hatfield. Criticism of Railtrack after the accident was rife, and the company had to pay over £700 million in compensation. It ceased trading owing to insolvency in 2002.

The fire of 11 December 2005 at Buncefield, Hemel Hempstead, was a major disaster. Hertfordshire's Chief Fire Officer, Roy Wilsher, said it was "possibly the largest in peacetime Europe." About sixty million gallons of petrol burned, the largest of the explosions measured just under 2.5 on the Richter scale, and the smoke darkened skies in neighbouring towns for two days before it could be extinguished.

In a long, gradual decline in agriculture, fishing and forestry, the 2011 census recorded 1,878 Hertfordshire workers employed in this sector.

== Conservation ==
Hertfordshire has a larger number of listed buildings and village greens pre-dating 1700 than Greater London, see for example Grade II* listed buildings in Hertfordshire which tend to be in this category. All 10 District (or Borough) Councils have designated conservation areas.

== Crime and criminals ==
King Stephen held court at St Albans in 1143. He arrested Geoffrey de Mandeville, who held shrievalty of London, Middlesex and Hertfordshire from the pretender Empress Matilda. De Mandeville surrendered his castles, including the one he had recently built at South Mimms, and went on to become a noted outlaw and bandit.

A seventeenth-century highwaywoman, called the "Wicked Lady", preyed on travellers on Nomansland Common along Watling Street to the far end of Wales. This may have been Lady Katherine Ferrers of Markyate Cell 1634-1660 who was married to a detached husband Thomas Fanshaw(e) and whose body was carried across the county to be buried at Ware. By the time of an 1840 fire at the large house, a folklore rhyme had arisen:
Near the cell there is a well
Near the well there is a tree
Near the tree the treasure be

In one of the last witch trials recorded, Jane Wenham, of Walkern, was convicted of witchcraft in 1712. The accused was over the age of 70 at the time. Queen Anne pardoned Wenham, who "lived on in a cottage at Gilston". In 1751, John and Ruth Osborne of Gubblecot, Tring, were accused of witchcraft. A mob dragged them through the village pond until Ruth drowned. One Thomas Colley, a chimney sweep and apparently the ringleader, was hanged; but the people disapproved of the hanging and did not come to watch.

There are records for Hitchin court from the 17th century. William Bogdani wrote in 1744:

... these Hitchiners are the most litigious people on earth, and most of them pretty rich, so that whenever I have attempted a distress they removed the cause to a superior court, where you may believe it is not worth my while to try it for the value of perhaps a 10 shilling or 20 shilling amercement.

In 1783 the vestry organised a watch to "put a stop to the daring robberies almost nightly committed in or near the town." The next year Vincenzo Lunardi's first balloon flight over Britain landed in Standon Green End where a stone commemorates the achievement.

Also in the late 18th century, Hertford's branch of Woolworths (now closed) was formerly an inn called the Maiden Head. From this inn, Walter Clibborn, the "murderous pie man of Hertford", operated. He pretended to be deaf, so that people would talk freely while he moved among them selling pies, overhearing their destinations and the location of their valuables; and, with his sons who blackened their faces, would ambush them later that night. Clibborn was shot dead in 1782 by one George North on the Datchworth to Branfield road.

In 1823, the murder of William Weare in Radlett became known as the first trial by newspaper. The murderer, who was the Mayor of Norwich's son John Thurtell, a notorious gambler, pleaded that the sensational newspaper coverage had prejudiced the court against him. It only took 20 minutes of deliberations for the jury to sentence him to death by hanging. The crowds that gathered for the trial were so large that the judge had trouble getting to the courthouse through the gridlocked streets, and about 15,000 people attended the hanging itself.

The murder of Mercy Nicholls in Railway Street, Hertford, in 1899, ultimately led to a major re-organisation of Hertfordshire's police force.

== Authors of Hertfordshire ==
Jane Austen (1775–1817) wrote about Hertfordshire. Pride and Prejudice is set in a fictionalised Hertfordshire. Sir Francis Bacon (1561–1626), writer and Lord Chancellor, lived at Gorhambury near St Albans and is buried at St Michael's. J. M. Barrie (1860–1937) based his character Peter Pan on Peter Llewelyn Davies, his friend's son, after visiting their family in Berkhamsted. Dame Juliana Berners (1388-?) was the author of the Boke of St Albans, a guide to hunting, hawking and heraldry, which was printed by Abbey Press in 1486. John Bunyan (1628–1688) was linked to Hitchin, and although he was gaoled outside the county in Bedford, he was a member of the Baptist Church at Kensworth (at that time in Hertfordshire, though now in Bedfordshire). He preached extensively in Hertfordshire. George Chapman (c. 1559 – 1634), a poet and playwright remembered for his translations of the Iliad and the Odyssey, was born in Hitchin and lived there. Geoffrey Chaucer (c. 1343 – 1400) was Clerk of the Works at Berkhamsted Castle in 1389.

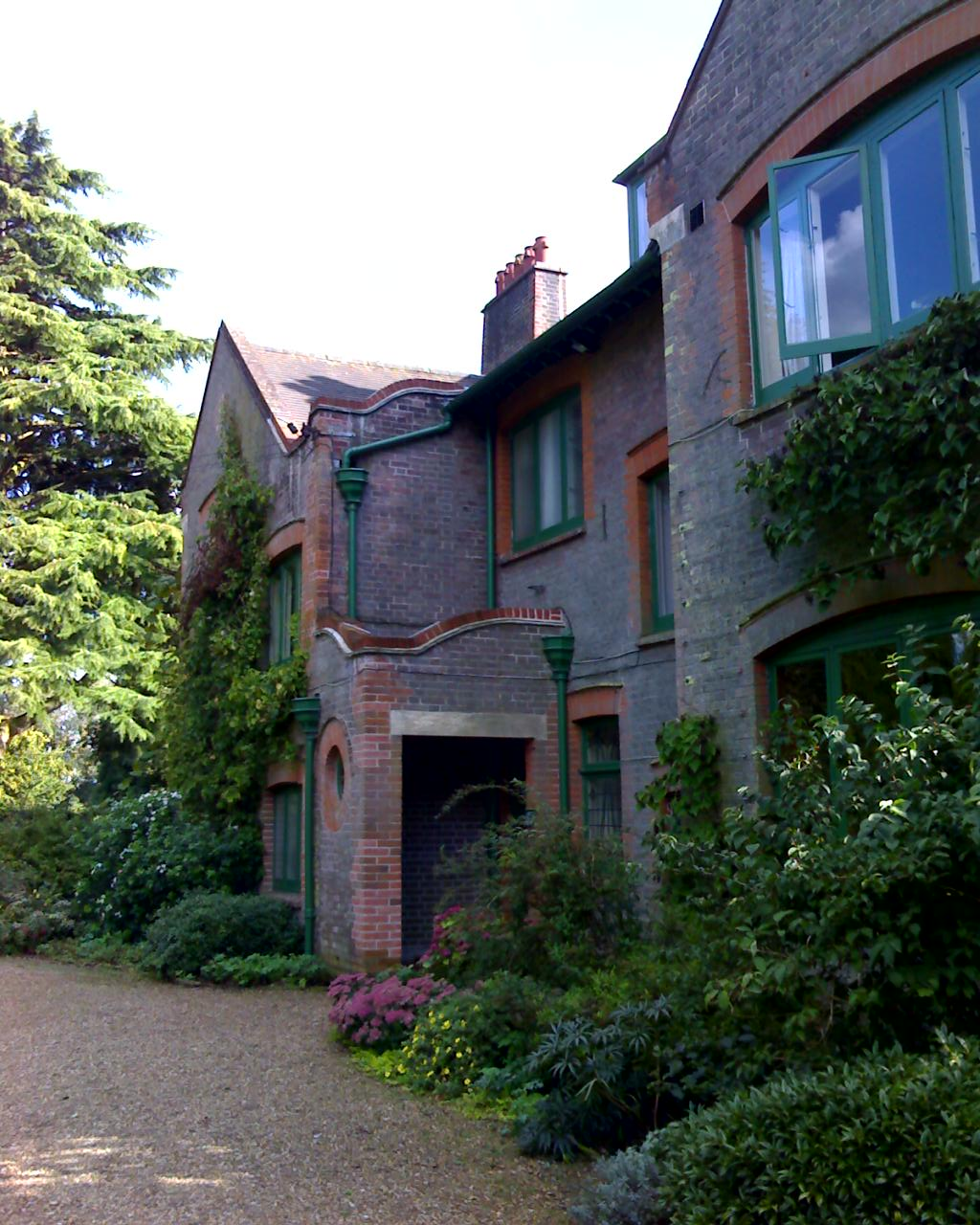
Shaw's corner

Sir Henry Chauncy (1632–1719), known for his Historical Antiquities of Hertfordshire (pub. 1700), was made first Recorder of Hertford in 1680. Samuel Taylor Coleridge (1772–1834) was educated at Christ's Hospital, Hitchin. William Cowper (1731–1800), poet, was born and lived in Berkhamsted. He was later institutionalised in an asylum in St Albans. Charles Dickens (1812–1870) was often in Hertfordshire (not least to visit his friend Edward Bulwer Lytton, who is mentioned below), and significant elements of his novels are set there. Sir Richard Fanshawe (1608–1666) was born at Ware Park and his memorial tablet is in Ware. E. M. Forster (1879-?) lived at Rook's Nest House between Stevenage and Weston. William Godwin (1756–1836), an anarchist philosopher, was a Chapel Minister in Ware; his feminist wife Mary Wollstonecraft (1759–1797), author of A Vindication of the Rights of Woman, gave him a daughter, Mary Shelley (1797–1851), who wrote Frankenstein. Graham Greene (1904–1991) was educated at Berkhamsted Grammar School, where his father was headmaster. Julian Grenfell (1888–1915), the First World War poet, lived in Panshanger. Lady Caroline Lamb (1785–1828) lived at Brocket Hall and wrote Glenarvon there after her unhappy love affair with Lord Byron. She is buried in Hatfield.

Nathaniel Lee (c. 1653 – 1692), poet and playwright, was born in Hatfield where his father was rector. Edward Bulwer-Lytton (1803–1873) lived at the family seat of Knebworth House where he often entertained Charles Dickens and Benjamin Disraeli, among others. John Scott, the Quaker poet and writer, moved to Great Amwell in 1740. He gave Amwell its name (after Emma's Well, which is nearby and now dry; the well has part of John Scott's poem "Emma" inscribed near it.) (Note: Scott is now mainly remembered for Scott's Grotto which was restored in the 1990s and is the largest grotto in the United Kingdom. East Hertfordshire District Council own it and it is open to the public.) Nobel prizewinning playwright George Bernard Shaw lived in Hertfordshire until his death in 1950. Anthony Trollope (1815–1882) lived in Waltham Cross. Thomas Walsingham (?-1422), author of the Historia Anglicana and chronicler of the Peasants' Revolt, was a monk in St Albans Abbey in the early 15th century.

== Film-making in Hertfordshire ==
Arthur Melbourne-Cooper's A Dream of Toyland (1908), one of the earliest animation films

Hertfordshire was the home of the pioneering British film maker Arthur Melbourne-Cooper, who was born in St Albans in 1874. He worked in Hertfordshire (but later what became the London Borough of Barnet), and witnessed the birth of the movies as an assistant/cameraman of Birt Acres (1854–1918). Acres, in 1895, co-developed the first British 35 mm moving picture camera under the guidance of British engineer R.W. Paul. Cooper, for the next 20 years, made contributions to the British moving picture industry. In 1908 Cooper set up the first permanent cinema in Hertfordshire, the Alpha Picture House in St Albans, and a cinema operated on this site for 87 years; the 1930s cinema building has recently been restored and re-opened as the Odyssey Cinema.

Elstree Studios nearby has risen to prominence; landmark films and television that have been produced there include the first and second Star Wars films (chronologically, i.e. Episodes IV and V), Indiana Jones, and Superman, The World's End and British television shows Dancing on Ice, Who Wants to Be a Millionaire?, and Big Brother. Parts of the Harry Potter film series production took place at Leavesden Film Studios. Wild child was filmed in Balls park, Hertford.

== Nobles and politicians of Hertfordshire ==
Æthelgifu was a Christian Saxon noblewoman who lived in the county in the late 980s, and her will is an important document for the study of the country as well as the county. (Note: Æthelgifu's will is one of only seventeen extant wills in Old English, and it is by far the most extensive of them. It gives much more detail on slave- and land-ownership in this period than any other document, and shows that a woman could have considerable wealth. The will is written in vellum in a minuscule hand, and the original still exists; an American consortium bought it in 1969 and it is now in New Jersey.) It shows that Æthelgifu had three large estates in Hertfordshire. She left much of her land to the monks of St Albans, and her will shows the importance of Hitchin as a legal and administrative centre. Hitchin likely stayed in royal hands into the 10th century.

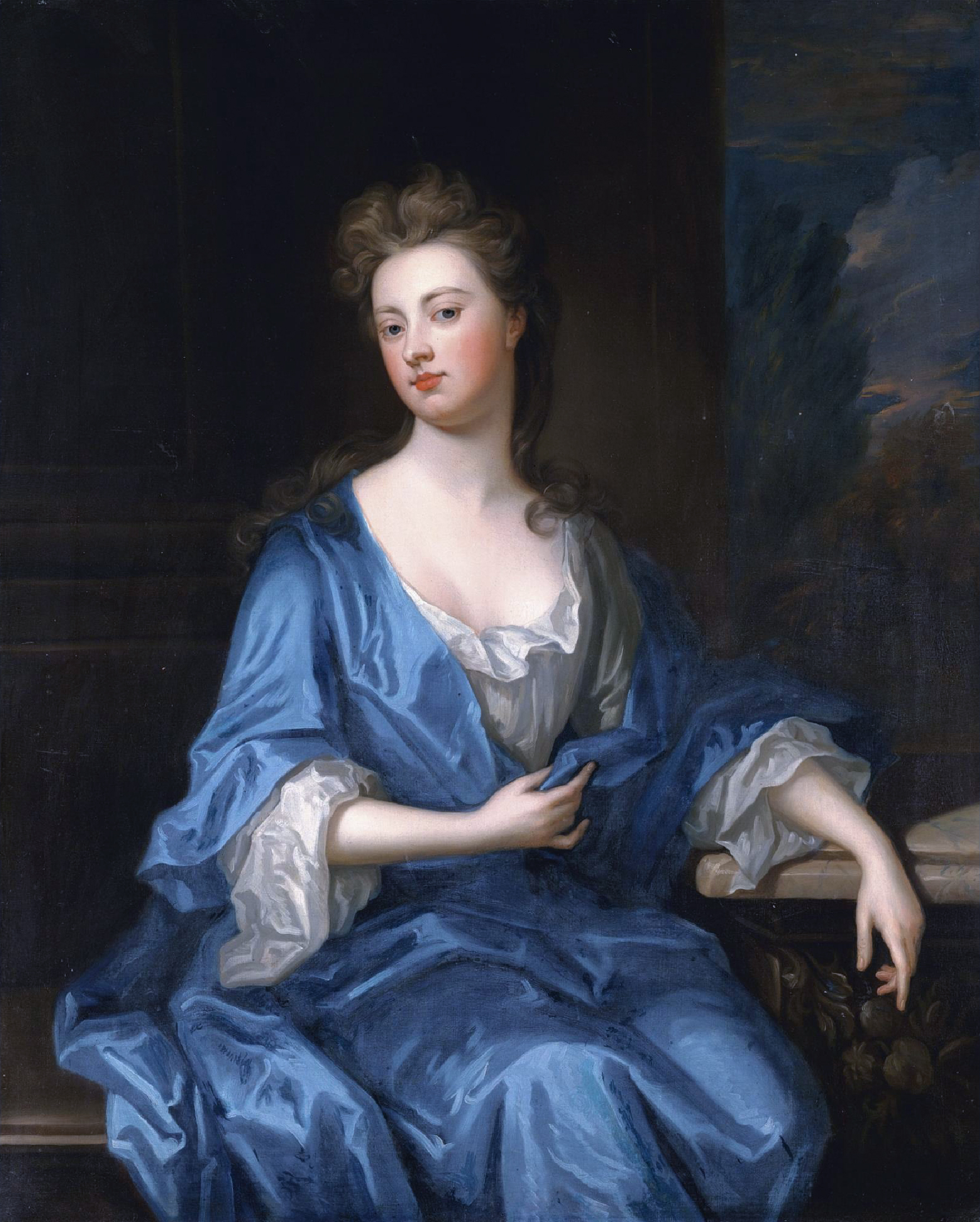
Painting of Sarah Churchill, by Sir Godfrey Kneller

Edward Seymour was appointed Earl of Hertford in 1559. He married Lady Catherine Grey, who was Lady Jane Grey's sister, in 1560. As Catherine was in line for the throne, she needed Queen Elizabeth's permission to wed, and because this was not sought, the marriage was held in secret with Edward's sister, Lady Jane Seymour, as the only witness. However, when Catherine became visibly pregnant, she had little option but to reveal her marriage and, at her request, Lord Robert Dudley told the Queen. An angry Elizabeth had the Earl and Countess of Hertford interned in the Tower of London and annulled their marriage.

Sarah Churchill, one of the most influential women in English history, was born as Sarah Jennings in St Albans in 1660. She married the Duke of Marlborough, rose to high favour with Queen Anne, then fell out with the queen and was dismissed, but returned to court after the queen's death. She argued with many important people in the late 17th and early 18th centuries, grew very rich, toured the continent and built Blenheim Palace. Winston Churchill and Diana, Princess of Wales, were both descended from her.

A new title, the Earl of St Albans, was created in 1628 with a short and undistinguished history, effectively wiped out in the civil war shortly thereafter. Rather than revive the Earldom, Charles Beauclerk, illegitimate son of King Charles II and Nell Gwyn, was made Duke of St Albans in 1684. This peerage is as of 2026 on its fourteenth duke.

Robert Arthur Gascoyne Talbot Cecil, the Marquess of Salisbury, was born at Hatfield House on 3 February 1830. He also died there, 73 years later. In a distinguished political career, he would go on to become the prime minister three times and foreign secretary four times. William Lamb, (Viscount) Melbourne and again prime minister, lived in Hertfordshire and at one stage was its co-member of Parliament. He died at Brocket Hall.

After the Local Government Act 1888, the first county councillors in Hertfordshire were elected on 17 January 1889.

Arthur Balfour, though born in Scotland, was educated in Hertfordshire before going to university at Cambridge. He served as MP for Hertford before being elected as prime minister in 1902. He resigned as prime minister in 1905, at which time he was the first prime minister to own a car. He later served as foreign secretary, when his Balfour Declaration was an important episode in the leadup to the creation of Israel.

== See also ==
- List of lost settlements in Hertfordshire
