= Abbots Langley =

Village near Watford, Hertfordshire, England

Coordinates: 51.701°N 0.416°W

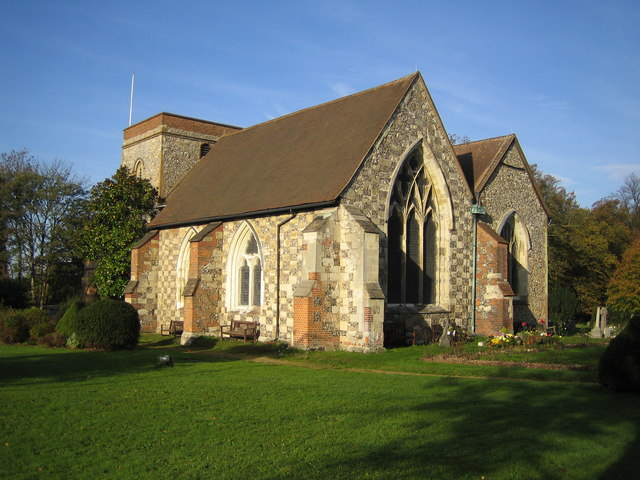
- St Lawrence the Martyr Church, Abbots Langley

- Location within Hertfordshire
- Population: 19,574 (2011 Census)
- OS grid reference: TL095015
- Civil parish: Abbots Langley
- District: Three Rivers
- Shire county: Hertfordshire
- Region: East
- Country: England
- Sovereign state: United Kingdom
- Post town: ABBOTS LANGLEY
- Postcode district: WD5
- Dialling code: 01923
- Police: Hertfordshire
- Fire: Hertfordshire
- Ambulance: East of England
- UK Parliament: South West Hertfordshire

Abbots Langley (/ˈæbəts ˈlæŋli/) is a large village and civil parish in the English county of Hertfordshire. It is an old settlement and is mentioned (under the name of Langelai) in the Domesday Book. Economically the village is closely linked to Watford and was formerly part of the Watford Rural District. Since 1974 it has been included in the Three Rivers district.

== Church ==
The parish church St Lawrence the Martyr is a Grade I listed Anglican church located in the centre of Abbots Langley, There is some indication of an earlier Saxon building. The building began as a 12th Century Norman structure. The nave is lined with Norman pillars. The church also contains the impressive white marble memorial to Baron Raymond of Langleybury, a Lord Chief Justice from 1724–1732.

The walls are built of Tottenhoe stone with flint and puddinstone inclusions often worked into a chequerboard pattern.

== History ==
This village has had a long history of human habitation. The first traces of human habitation in the area were recorded by archaeologist Sir John Evans (1823–1908). The village sits on a saucer of clay covered by a layer of gravel, and as a result water supply has never been a problem; records show that in earlier times water could be drawn from a well just 20 feet (6.1 m) deep.

In 1045 the Saxon thegn Ethelwine "the Black" granted the upper part of Langlai to St Albans Abbey as Langlai Abbatis (Latin for Langlai of the Abbot, hence "Abbot's Langley") the remainder being the king's Langlai. By the time of the Domesday Book in 1086 the village was inhabited by 19 families.

The area was split into four manors: Abbots Langley, Langleybury, Chambersbury, and Hyde. In 1539, Henry VIII seized Abbots Langley and sold it to his military engineer Sir Richard Lee. The Manor of Abbots Langley was bequeathed by Francis Combe in his will of 1641 jointly to Sidney Sussex College, Cambridge and Trinity College, Oxford. The manors of Langleybury and Chambersbury passed through the family of William Ibgrave, the king's embroider, and the Child family, and in 1711 were conveyed to Sir Robert Raymond then Solicitor General later Attorney General and Lord Chief Justice of the King's Bench. On the death of his son without issue in 1756 the manors passed to the Filmer family. The Manor of Hyde passed to Edward Strong in 1714, through his daughter to Sir John Strange, who left the manor to be shared between his children and their descendants (including Admiral Sir George Strong Nares) and then to the possession of F.M. Nares & Co which sold the estate to the British Land Company in 1858.

On Tibbs Hill Road there is a well-preserved example of a Prince Albert's Model Cottage. The original design and construction was for the Great Exhibition of 1851, to demonstrate model housing for the poor. Subsequently, the design was replicated in several other locations, including Abbots Langley.

The former Ovaltine Model Dairy Farm in Abbots Langley is located on Bedmond Road, and was established in 1932 to supply milk to the nearby Ovaltine factory in Kings Langley. It was designed in a distinctive, scenic style inspired by Marie Antoinette's farm at Versailles. The site features thatched buildings around a central courtyard. It closed as a farm in 1979 and was converted into residential homes known as Antoinette Court in the early 1980s.

Kitters Green developed as a separate hamlet by Manor House. The land between Kitters Green and Abbots Langley was bought from the estate of Sarah Smith by the British Land Company in 1866. It laid out plots for development along Adrian, Breakspear, Garden and Popes roads. The development of these plots led to the merger of the two settlements and the loss of Kitters Green's separate identity.

== Transportation ==
The West Coast Main Line railway passes through the western edge of the parish, where it crosses Abbots Langley railway bridge, a skewed brick arch, and Nash Mills railway bridge, originally built in cast iron but strengthened in the 1960s by encasing it in concrete. Both bridges are original features from the London and Birmingham Railway. They date from 1837 and are both Grade II listed buildings.

The nearest station opened in 1839. Now called Kings Langley railway station, it bore the name of both villages from 1909 to 1974.

The M25 London Orbital Motorway passes north of Abbots Langley and the A41 road runs through the southwest of the village.

== Sport ==
Abbots Langley Cricket Club and Langleybury Cricket Club are both based in the village. There are a number of football clubs, including Abbots Langley F.C., Ecocall F.C., Evergreen, Everett Rovers, and Bedmond F.C.

== People ==
- Nick Blinko (born 1961), artist and singer/songwriter/guitarist of Rudimentary Peni.
- Pope Adrian IV (fl. 1100–1159), born in Abbots Langley as Nicholas Breakspear.
- James Cecil, 1st Marquess of Salisbury (1748–1823) probably lived at Cecil Lodge 1760s–80.
- Violet Cressy-Marcks (1895–1970), explorer and journalist, lived at Hazelwood (now Hunton Park) 1930–70.
- David Crighton, (1942–2000), mathematician, educated at Abbots Langley primary school.
- John Evans (1823–1908), archaeologist and geologist, married and buried, St Lawrence Church, Abbots Langley.
- John Evans (1893–1977), historian of mediaeval art.
- Elizabeth Greenhill, (1615–1679), mother of 37 single births and one set of twins.
- Thomas Greenhill (1669–1740), surgeon to Henry Howard, 7th Duke of Norfolk and 39th and last child of Elizabeth Greenhill.
- Judy Grinham (born 1939), former British competitive swimmer, Olympic gold medallist, and former world record-holder lives in The Crescent.
- Michael Gregsten (1924–1961), physicist at the Road Research Laboratory, victim of James Hanratty in the 1961 "A6 murder" for whose death he hanged.
- Ollie Halsall (1949–1992), influential rock/jazz guitarist and vibraphone player, lived here and recorded an album titled "Abbot's Langley" in 1980.
- Tom Hardy (born 1954), disc-jockey with Radio Caroline in the late 1970s, lived in Parsonage Close.
- Liz Kendall (born 1971), Labour MP, lived in Langley Road
- Robert Kindersley, 1st Baron Kindersley (1871–1954), businessman, stockbroker, merchant banker, and public servant, lived at Langley House 1906–23.
- Hugh Kindersley, 2nd Baron Kindersley (1899–1976)
- KSI (born 1993), rapper, actor, boxer and YouTube personality.
- Joe Lane (1892–1959), former professional footballer.
- Marghanita Laski (1915–88), journalist and novelist, lived at Abbots House 1937–45.
- Eryl McNally, former Labour MEP.
- Henry Montagu, 6th Baron Rokeby (1798–1883), soldier, lived at Hazelwood 1838–86.
- James Vincent Murphy (1880–1946), propagandist for Hitler, translated Mein Kampf while resident in Abbots Langley
- Robert Raymond, 1st Baron Raymond (1673–1733), politician and judge, lived at Langleybury 1711–33.
- Haile Selassie (1892–1975), spent the early part of his exile from Ethiopia at Hazelwood.
- Edward Skoyles (1923–2008) researcher and quantity surveyor.
- William Henry Smith (1825–91), politician and member of the WHSmith newsagent family, lived at Cecil Lodge 1864–70.
- Nicky Stevens (born 1951), singer with The Brotherhood of Man, lived in Abbots Road.
- George Turnbull (1809–1878), civil engineer (the "first railway engineer of India"), retired to Rosehill, Abbots Langley.
- Bradley Walsh (born 1960), entertainer lived in Breakspear Road.
- Mark Walsh (born 1965), professional darts player within the Professional Darts Corporation.

== See also ==
- Bedmond
- Garston Manor, a grade II listed Georgian Country House located within the parish
- Hunton Bridge
- Kings Langley
- Langleybury
- Leavesden Hospital
