= Langleybury =

Country house in Hertfordshire, England

Coordinates: 51°41′24″N 00°26′34″W

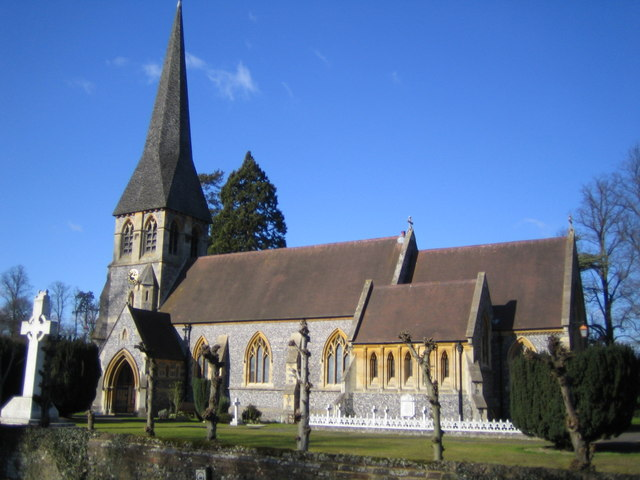
St Paul's Church, Langleybury (Henry Woodyer, 1863-5) at Hunton Bridge

Langleybury is a country house and estate in Abbots Langley, Hertfordshire, England, about 3 miles (5 km) northwest of the centre of the town of Watford. The house stands on a low hill above the valley of the River Gade. Langleybury is the home of a cricket club, Langleybury CC.

== Owners ==
=== Raymond 1711–1756 ===
The estate was purchased in 1711 by Robert Raymond, then Solicitor General and later Attorney General, subsequently Baron Raymond, who was Lord Chief Justice of England and Wales from 1724 until 1732.

In 1720 he demolished the original house, of which little is known, and built the mansion which still stands on the site today. A park was laid out around the house in the later eighteenth century. His cipher, a griffin in a crown, can still be seen on the building.

=== Filmer 1756–1838 ===
On the death of his son, Robert Raymond, 2nd Baron Raymond, without issue in 1756, the manor was left to Sir Beversham Filmer, 5th Baronet, of East Sutton in Kent. He, dying without children in 1805, bequeathed it to his nephew, Sir John Filmer, 7th Baronet.) It then descended in the family till 1838. The Filmers were absentee landlords.

In 1762 the road at the lower edge of the park became the Sparrows Herne turnpike, and in the 1790s the Grand Junction Canal was dug along the valley bottom alongside the road.

=== Fearnley Whittingstall 1838–1856 ===
In 1838 Sir Edmund Filmer (8th Bt) sold the estate to Edmund Fearnley Whittingstall (né Fearnley), a Watford brewer. He started a bank in partnership with William Smith which went into bankruptcy soon after Whittingstall's death, forcing the sale of the estate in 1856.

=== Jones Loyd 1856–1947 ===
The estate was then held by William Jones Loyd (1821–1885), a partner in the London branch of Jones Loyd & Co, who was High Sheriff of Hertfordshire in 1861 and cousin to Samuel Jones-Loyd, 1st Baron Overstone. Jones Loyd built the nearby church of St Paul in 1864. His son, Edward Henry Loyd, was High Sheriff of Hertfordshire in 1894.

During the Second World War the house was leased to the Equity and Law Insurance Company.

== School 1947–1996 ==
In 1947 the estate was sold to Hertfordshire County Council who converted the house and grounds into a secondary school, named Langleybury School, which opened in 1949. In the late 1950s a modern school was built to the south of the mansion, which remained in use as part of the school and as teacher accommodation.

The mansion was designated as Grade II* listed in 1953.

== Present day ==
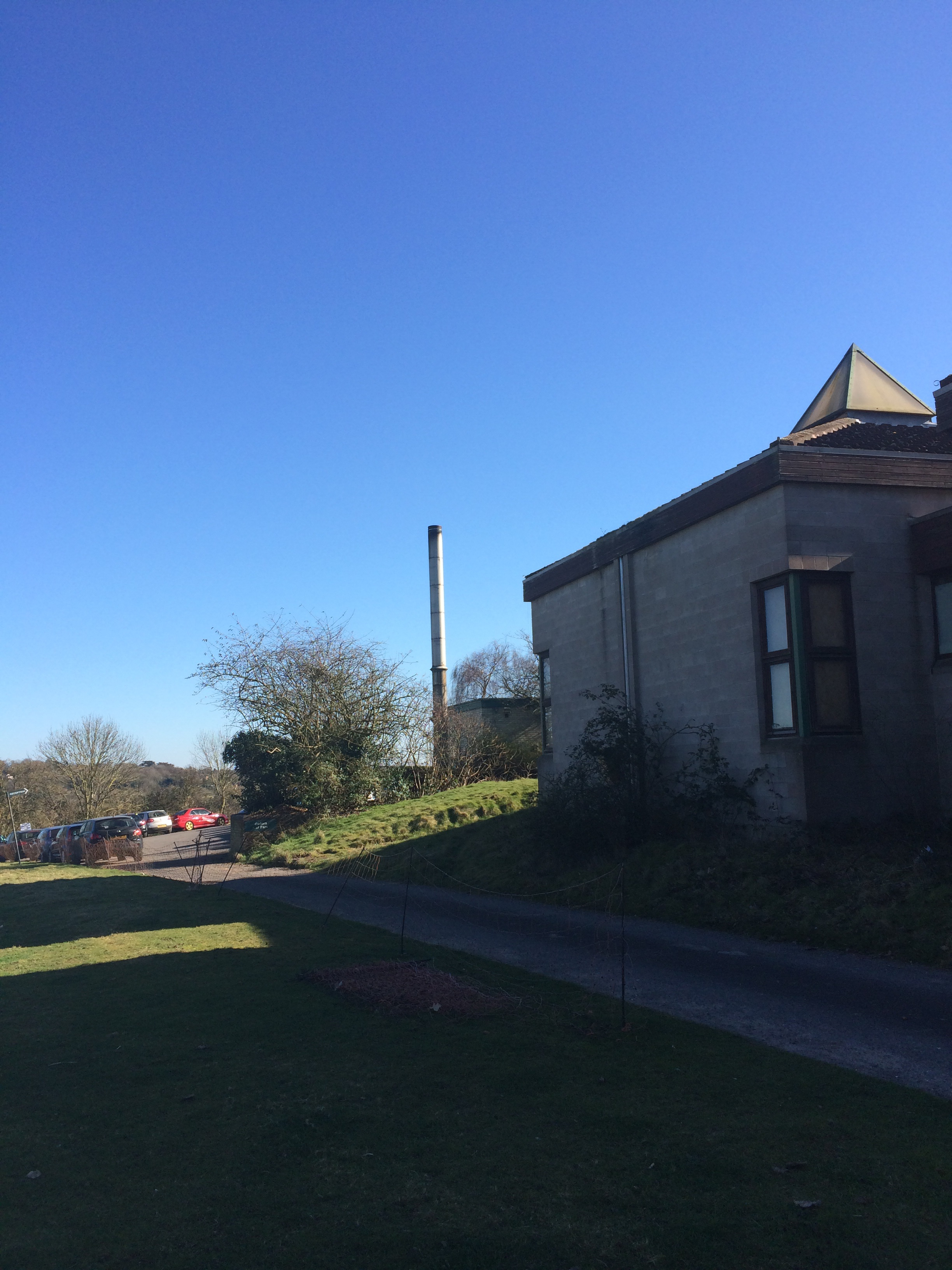
CCB - close quarter battle day car park, looking at the modern block and boiler room and modern school entrance

Langleybury School closed in 1996 and for a time partly housed Hertfordshire County Council's Social Services offices.

The empty modern school became a favoured film location site, notably for the Hope and Glory TV series of 1999. The site has been used in numerous TV shows and adverts, as well as films such as St Trinians and In The Heart Of The Sea. The house appears in the British TV series Endeavour as "Blenheim Vale". It is also used as a CCB (close combat battle) area for people who play Airsoft (an outdoor combat game) in the buildings which are still safe to enter. A children’s farm is situated in the old farm attached to the mansion house.

In conjunction with Newby Hall the Langleybury House was used in crafting the look of the fictitious manor house Hundreds Hall in the 2018 film The Little Stranger, which was directed by Lenny Abrahamson and starred Domhnall Gleeson and Ruth Wilson. In the article "Domestic Disturbances: Crafting The Look Of The Little Stranger" the production designer, Simon Elliott, explained how he was given free rein by the owners to modify Langleybury House for the production of the movie, including knocking down walls.

The house and its stable block (dated 1726) have been converted into flats.

== Notable people ==
Violet Cressy-Marcks (1895–1970), explorer and journalist, buried at Langleybury church.

== Cricket Club ==
The cricket club lies opposite to the church. An England player, Steven Finn, played for this clubThere is a common rivalry against Abbots Langley CC. Langleybury CC's badge consists of a gold leaf surrounded by the words Langleybury Cricket Club. Their sponsor since 2024 has been [The Grove, Watford]. The club currently has 4 men's teams as of 2025.

== See also ==
- Abbots Langley
- Hunton Bridge
