= Thomas Woolston =

17th/18th-century English theologian

- Born: November 1668 (baptised); Northampton, England
- Died: 27 January 1733 (aged 64)
- Education: Sidney Sussex College, Cambridge
- Occupation: Theologian
- Known for: Allegorical interpretation of Scripture, Deistical controversy
- Notable work: "The Old Apology for the Truth of the Christian Religion against the Jews and Gentiles Revived" (1705), "The Moderator between an Infidel and an Apostate" (1725), "Discourses on the Miracles of the New Testament" (1727-1729)

Thomas Woolston (baptised November 1668 – 27 January 1733) was an English theologian. Although he was often classed as a deist, his biographer William H. Trapnell regards him as an Anglican who held unorthodox theological views.

== Biography ==
Thomas Woolston, born at Northampton in 1668, the son of a currier, the scholar entered Sidney Sussex College, Cambridge, in 1685; attained the Master of Arts in 1692; the Bachelor of Divinity conferred in 1699; took orders and was made a fellow of his college.

After a time, by the study of Origen and the other early Fathers, he became possessed with the notion of the importance of an allegorical or spiritual interpretation of Scripture, and advocated its use in the defence of Christianity both in his sermons and in his first book, while attacking what he saw as the shallow literalist interpretation of contemporary divines, The Old Apology for the Truth of the Christian Religion against the Jews and Gentiles Revived (1705). For many years he published nothing, but in 1720-1721 the publication of letters and pamphlets in advocacy of his assessment of the Old Testament, with open challenges to the clergy to refute them, brought him into trouble. It was reported that his mind was disordered, and he lost his fellowship. From 1721 he lived for the most part in London, on an allowance of £30 a year from his brother and other presents.

His influence on the course of the deistical controversy began with his book, The Moderator between an Infidel and an Apostate (1725, 3rd ed. 1729). The infidel intended was Anthony Collins, who had maintained in his book alluded to that the New Testament is based on the Old, and that not the literal but only the allegorical sense of the prophecies can be quoted in proof of the Messiahship of Jesus; the apostate was the clergy who had forsaken the allegorical method of the fathers. Woolston denied absolutely the proof from miracles, called in question the fact of the resurrection of Christ and other miracles of the New Testament, and maintained that they must be interpreted allegorically, or as types of spiritual things. Two years later he began a series of Discourses on the same subject, in which he applied the principles of his Moderator to the miracles of the Gospels in detail. The Discourses, 30,000 copies of which were said to have been sold, were six in number, the first appearing in 1727, the next five 1728–1729, with two Defences in 1729 1730. For these publications he was tried before Chief Justice Raymond in 1729. Found guilty of blasphemy, Woolston was sentenced (28 November) to pay a fine of £25 for each of the first four Discourses, with imprisonment until paid, and also to a year's imprisonment and to give security, for his good behaviour during life. He failed to find this security, and remained in confinement until his death.

Voltaire was living in London at the time of the Woolston and Collins deistical controversy, and reproduced many of the arguments of Woolston in Dictionnaire philosophique (1764), Questions sur les miracles (1765), Examen important de Milord Bolingbroke (1766) and Dieu et les hommes (1769).

== Replies ==
Upwards of sixty pamphlets appeared in reply to his Moderator and Discourses. Among them were:

- Zachary Pearce, The Miracles of Jesus Vindicated (1729)
- Thomas Sherlock, The Tryal of the Witnesses of the Resurrection of Jesus (1729, 13th ed. 1755)
- Nathaniel Lardner, Vindication of Three of Our Saviour's Miracles (1729), Lardner being one of those who did not approve of the prosecution of Woolston (see Lardner's Life by Andrew Kippis, in Lardner's Works, vol. i.)
