= Hunton Bridge =

Coordinates: 51.693714°N 0.434516°W

- Location within Hertfordshire
- Population: 327 (1991 Census)
- OS grid reference: TL067030
- District: Three Rivers
- Shire county: Hertfordshire
- Region: East
- Country: England
- Sovereign state: United Kingdom
- Post town: KINGS LANGLEY
- Postcode district: WD4
- Dialling code: 01923
- Police: Hertfordshire
- Fire: Hertfordshire
- Ambulance: East of England
- UK Parliament: Hemel Hempstead

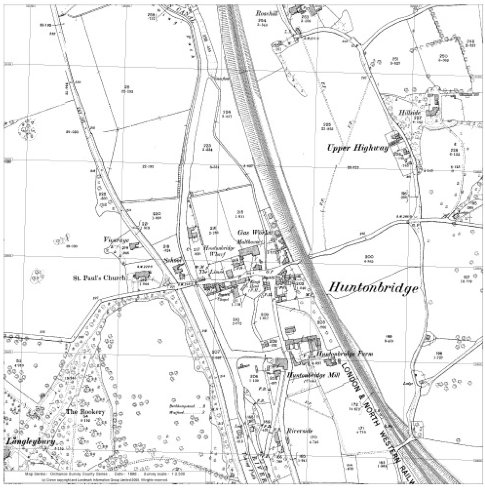
Ordnance survey map from 1898

Hunton Bridge is a small settlement near Abbots Langley, Hertfordshire, England, with a historic royal connection. Its population in the 1991 Census was 327. It is in the Three Rivers population of Langleybury.

Hunton Bridge enjoyed its greatest prosperity during 1810–26, when the Sparrows Herne Turnpike ran through the village. Prior to that date the turnpike had run along Gypsy Lane and Upper Highway. In 1810 it was rerouted along Old Mill Lane to the village, and up the hill to reconnect with Upper Highway. By 1826 the presence of the canal and the works associated with it had dried out the bottom land sufficiently for the turnpike to be rerouted along what is now the A41 avoiding the climb up Hunton Bridge Hill.

Today the village is situated between the M25 London orbital motorway and a spur of the motorway leading to Watford. The A41 trunk road runs just west of the village. The Hunton Bridge filling station just off the Watford spur (Junction 19 of the M25) is a local landmark.

== History ==
=== St Paul's Church ===
St Paul's Church is a Grade II* listed building, dating from 1863 to 1865. It was designed by Henry Woodyer for William Jones Loyd of Langleybury House. The Old Vicarage alongside, now a private home, dates from 1879.

=== Public houses ===
Hunton Bridge currently has two public houses. It used to have five, having lost the Maltsters Arms in 1963, the Farriers Arms in 1965, and The Dog and Partridge in August 2017.

The remaining pubs are :

- The Kings Head: a 400-year-old grade II listed building which has now been refurbished as a restaurant and bar. In the years when the turnpike ran through Hunton Bridge it served as a coaching inn;
- the Kings Lodge, which was built in 1642 as a hunting lodge for King Charles I, also refurbished as a restaurant and bar.

=== 1 Bridge Road ===
The land adjacent to the Grand Union Canal and to the north of Bridge Road was in industrial use from the opening of the canal. A coal wharf known as Hunton Bridge Wharf was established approximately 100 years after the opening, consisting of a tramway, warehouse and managers dwelling. Of these buildings only the cottage remains at 1 Bridge Road.

=== The Old School House ===
The original house was demolished and replaced with the current fine brick early Georgian building which was built in the late 1720s. Subsequent changes were made during the 1800s such as the addition of the library joining the main house to the servant wing.

The schoolhouse was used for Church of England services until the building of St Paul's church across the road in Langleybury.

=== Hunton Canal Bridge ===
The original structure was demolished in 1923 and replaced with an ornate reinforced concrete skew arch. The structure includes an ornate cornice to the parapet and balustrades. The existing western edge beam was demolished in 1983 due to a vehicular impact with a new aluminium parapet. The structure was Grade II listed in 1985.

Images of Hunton Bridge
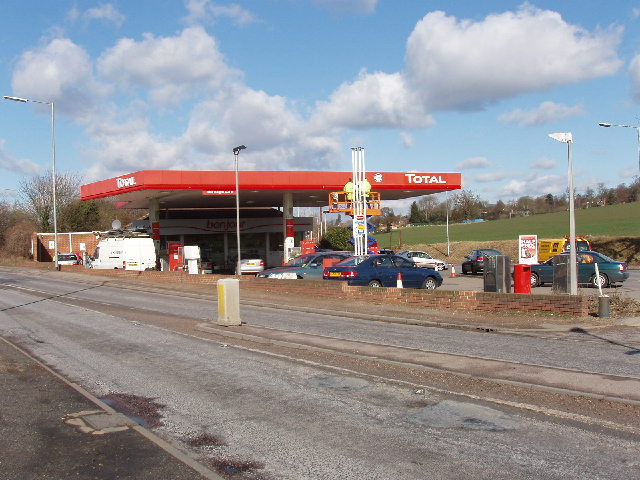
Hunton Bridge filling station

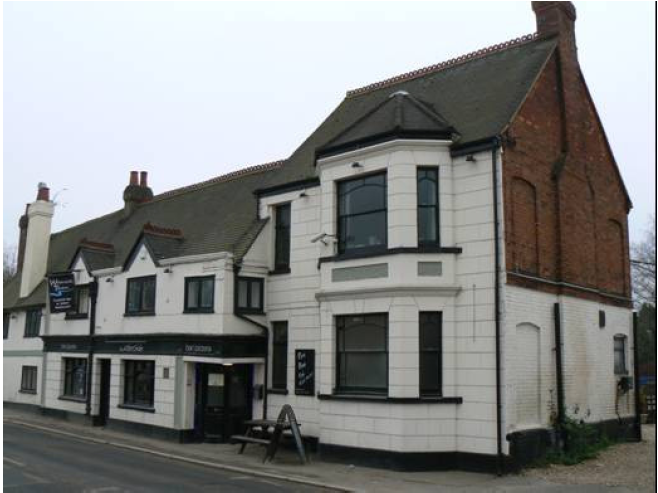
Kings Head 2008

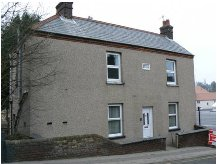
1 Bridge Road 1999

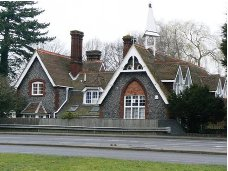
The Old School House 1999

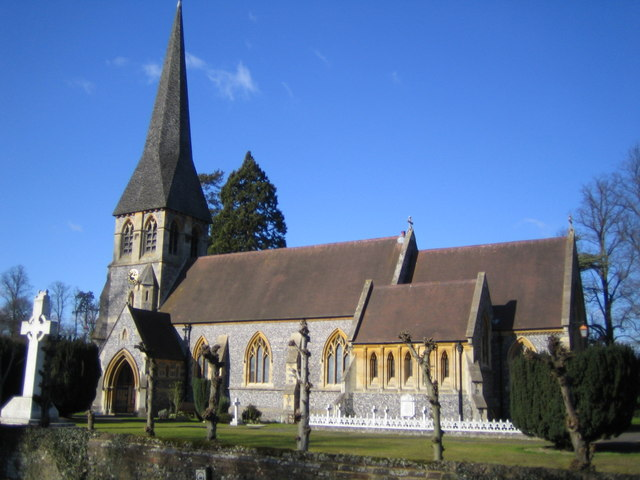
St Paul's Church, Langleybury (Henry Woodyer, 1863-5)

== Planning history ==
On 28 June 1984, Three Rivers District Council Planning Committee resolved that an area of Hunton Bridge, should be designated as a Conservation Area, and subsequently extended in 1990 in terms of the Planning (Listed Building and Conservation Areas) Act 1990.

Listed buildings within the boundary include

Grade II* Listed

- Church of St. Paul
- The Kings Lodge

Grade II Listed

- Lych Gate
- Loyd Memorial Cross
- The Old School House
- The Kings Head Public House
- K6 Telephone Kiosk
- Hunton Canal Bridge

Locally Important Buildings

- 1, Bridge Road
- Brookside Cottages

== See also ==
- Abbots Langley
- Langleybury
- Kings Langley
