= Abbots Langley railway bridge =

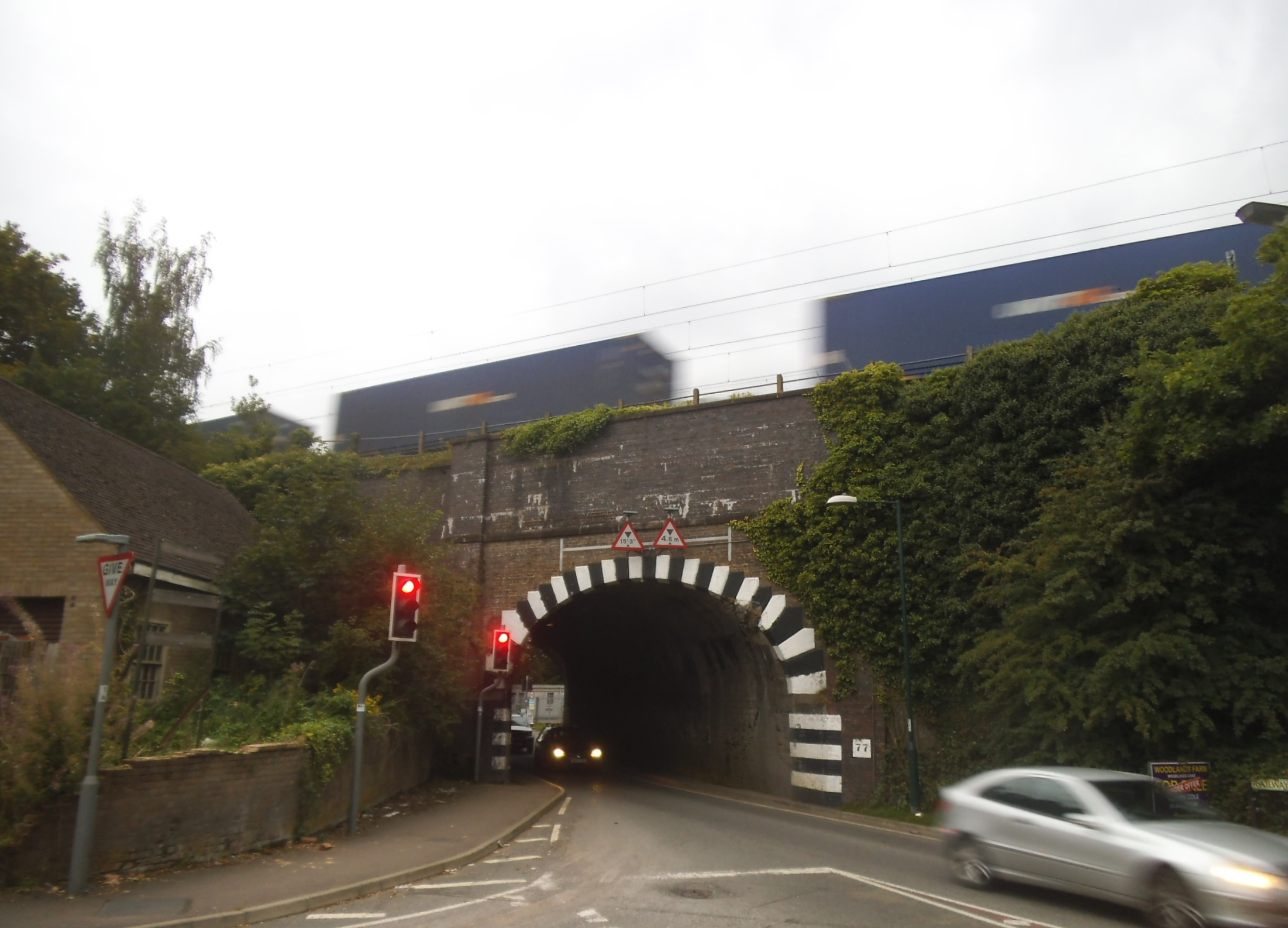
- The bridge seen from the west
- Coordinates: 51°43′24″N 0°26′52″W
- Carries: West Coast Main Line
- Crosses: Railway Terrace
- Locale: Abbots Langley, Hertfordshire
- Maintained by: Network Rail
- Heritage status: Grade II listed building

Characteristics
- Material: Brick
- No. of spans: 1

History
- Opened: 1837

Location
- Interactive map of Abbots Langley railway bridge

Abbots Langley railway bridge, also known as the bridge over Railway Terrace, is a skew bridge carrying the West Coast Main Line over a road near Abbots Langley, Hertfordshire, in Eastern England (just north-west of London). The angle of the bridge creates a 25-metre (82-foot) tunnel along the road. It was built in 1837 and is a Grade II listed building.

== Design ==
The bridge is a single semi-circular skew arch across Railway Terrace, part of Station Road, at the western edge of Abbots Langley and just south of Kings Langley railway station. It was built to the designs of Robert Stephenson, the chief engineer of the London and Birmingham Railway. It is in red brick, with repairs in blue engineering brick and stone voussoirs (the inside of the arch) on both faces.

It has substantial brickwork above the arch and a course of stonework between the arch and the parapet and has splayed abutments which meet substantial curved wing walls, making the arch look disproportionately small. A stone band runs the length of the parapets, which have been largely rebuilt. The angle of the bridge between the abutments creates a 25-metre (82-foot) tunnel through which the road passes.

== History ==
The bridge was complete for the opening of the London and Birmingham Railway in 1837. It was widened in the same style on its eastern side in 1858 when the line was quadruple-tracked but is otherwise largely unaltered since its construction. It is one of several skew bridges on the same section of railway; a short distance to the north west is Nash Mills bridge. It remains in use and was designated a Grade II listed building in 1985. Listed building status affords legal protection from unauthorised demolition or modification.
