= Beech Bottom Dyke =

Iron Age ditch in England

Coordinates: 51.7693°N 0.3263°W

Beech Bottom Dyke, is a large ditch running for almost a mile at the northern edge of St Albans, Hertfordshire, flanked by banks on both sides. It is up to 30 m (98 ft) wide, and 10 m (33 ft) deep.

== Route ==
The dyke can be followed for three quarters of a mile between the 'Ancient Briton Crossroads' on the A1081 road between St Albans and Harpenden road, until it meets the Midland Main Line at Sandridge. Beyond the railway embankment it continues, to finish just short of the B651 road between St Albans and Sandridge, but this part is not accessible to the public.

== History ==
The dyke was constructed towards the end of the Iron Age, probably between 5 and 40 AD. This, and other similar earthworks in the district, may have been built by the powerful Celtic tribe established in this area, the Catuvellauni, probably by King Cunobelinus to define areas of land around their tribal centre at Verlamion, the predecessor of the Roman city of Verulamium.

Beech Bottom Dyke is thought to have originally been part of a defensive system for a Belgic settlement. Other defences are the Devil's Dyke and another ancient earthwork known as "The Slad". These may have created a defensive earthwork running from the River Lea to the River Ver enclosing a very large area.

== Gallery ==
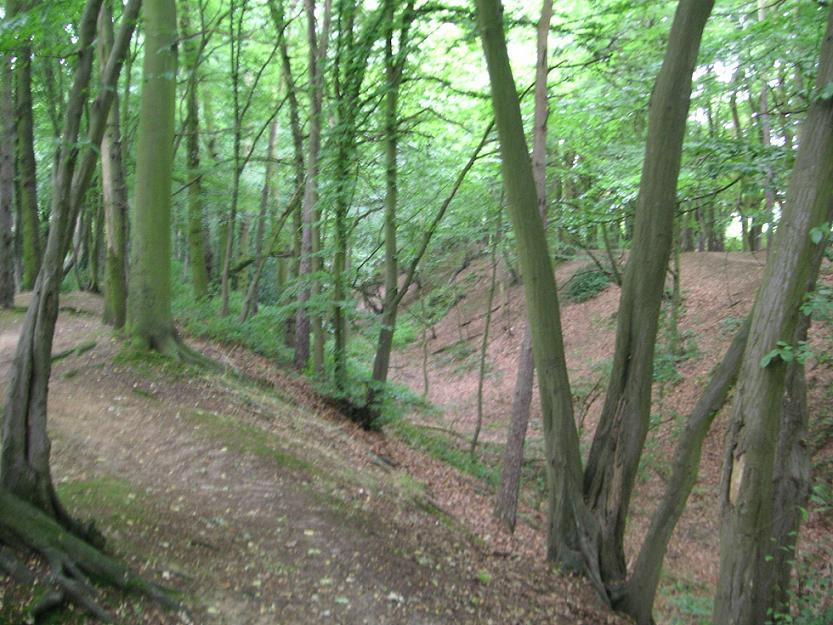
Photograph of the Dyke

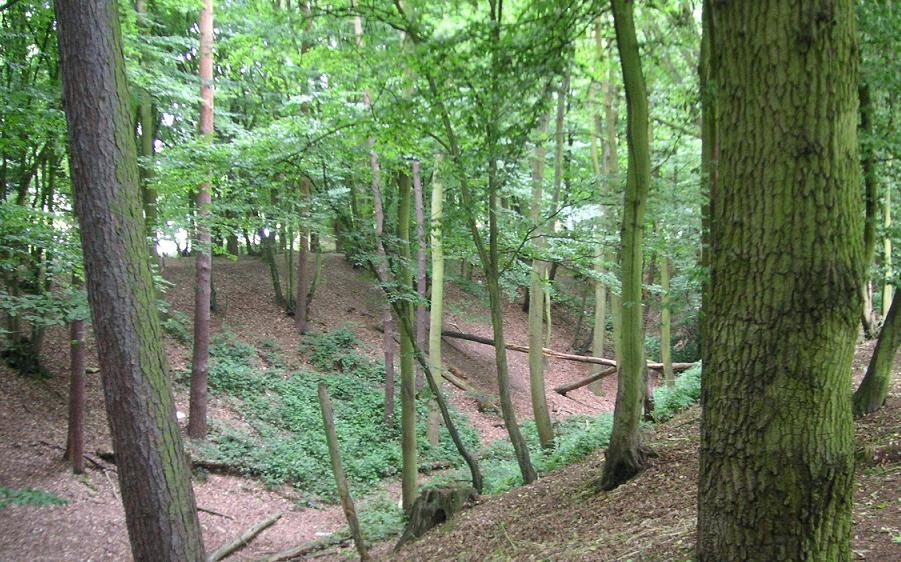
Photograph of the Dyke

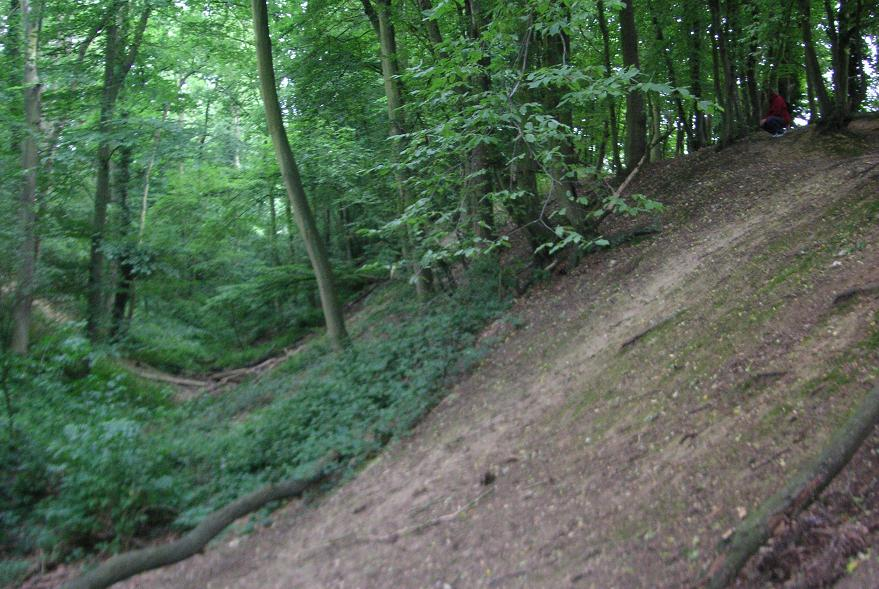
Photograph of the Dyke
