= Robert Raymond, 1st Baron Raymond =

British judge and politician

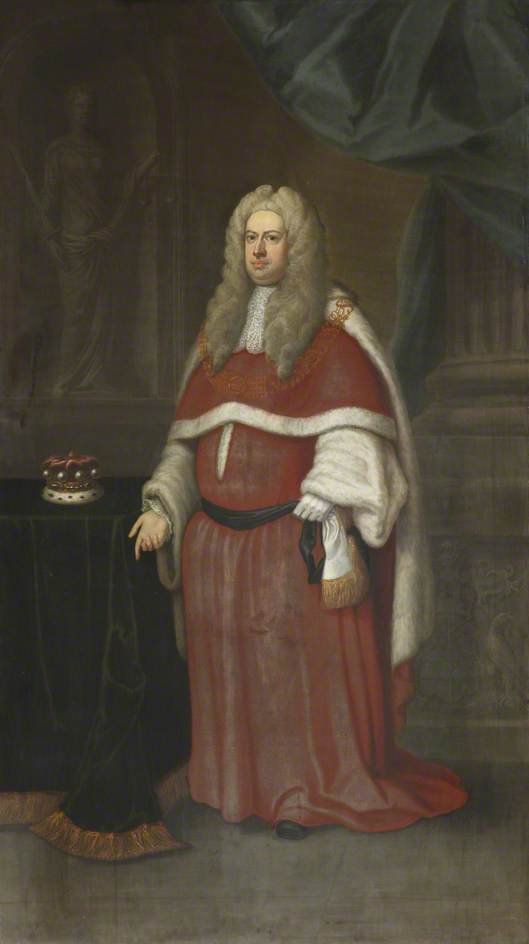
Lord Raymond

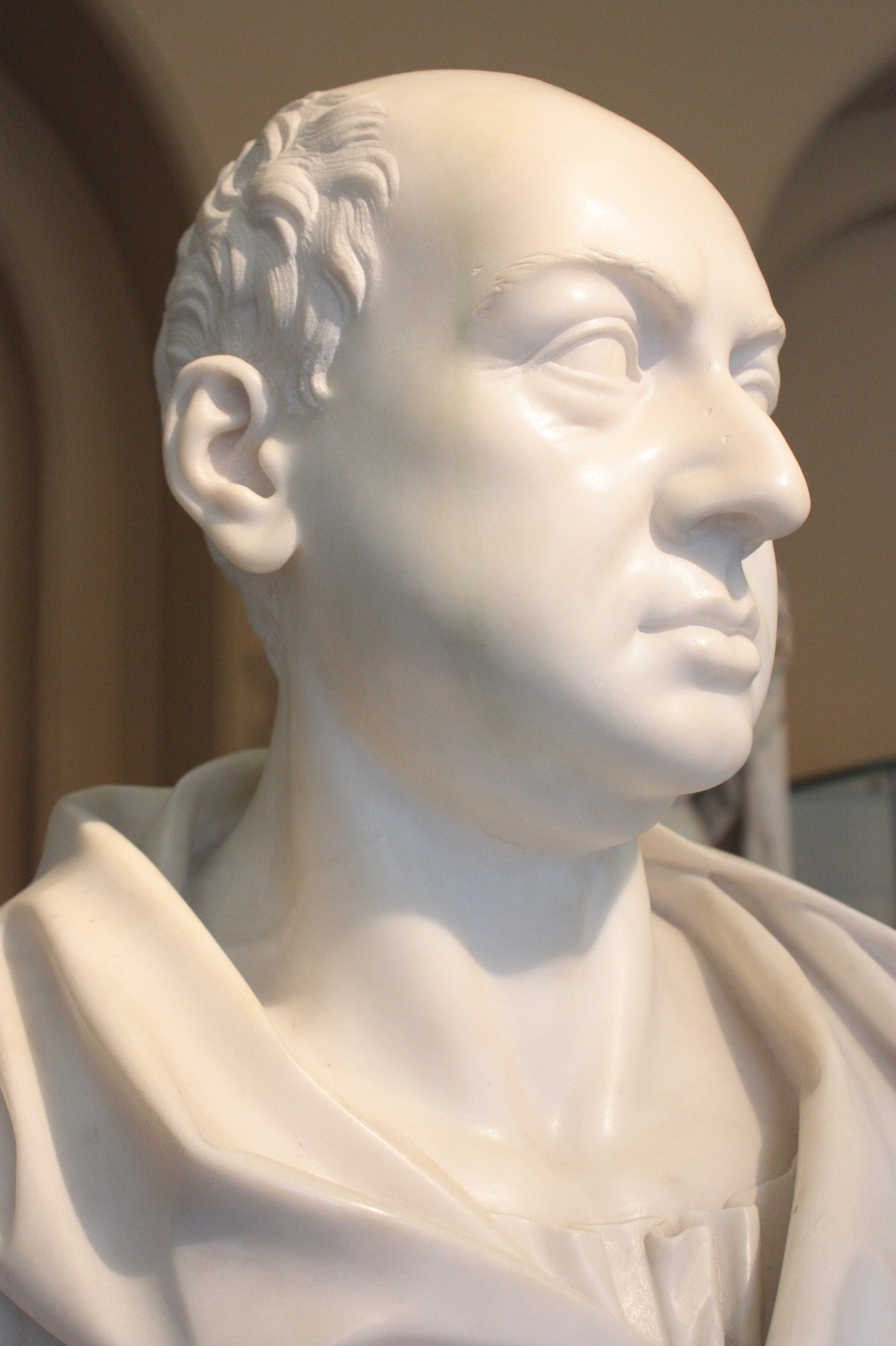
Robert Raymond by Roubiliac, 1732, Victoria and Albert Museum

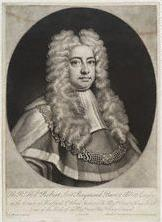
Sir Robert Raymond, 1st Baron Raymond (1673 - 1733).

Robert Raymond, 1st Baron Raymond, PC (20 December 1673 – 18 March 1733) was an English judge, politician and peer who sat in the British House of Commons between 1710 and 1724.

== Life ==
Raymond was the son of the judge Sir Thomas Raymond. He was educated at Eton and Christ's College, Cambridge. Said to have been admitted to Gray's Inn aged nine, he became a barrister in 1697 and was admitted at Lincoln's Inn in 1710. He succeeded his father in 1683 and was knighted on 20 Oct. 1710.

At the 1710 general election, Raymond was returned as Member of Parliament for Bishop's Castle and retained the seat in the 1713 general election. He was returned as MP for Yarmouth (Isle of Wight) in the 1715 general election but was unseated on petition in 1717. He re-entered parliament at a by-election at Ludlow on 26 March 1719. At the 1722 general election he was returned unopposed at Helston but he resigned the seat in 1724. In 1725 he was invested as Privy Counsellor.

Raymond, a Tory, was appointed as Lord Chief Justice of the King's Bench on 2 March 1725, a post he held until his death. In the trial of Deist Thomas Woolston in 1729 Raymond said:

Christianity in general is Parcel of the Common Law of England, and therefore to be protected by it; now whatever strikes at the Root of Christianity, tends manifestly to a Dissolution of the Civil Government...so that to say, an Attempt to subvert the establish'd Religion is not punishable by those Laws upon which it is establish'd, is an Absurdity.

In 1731 he was raised to the peerage as Lord Raymond, Baron of Abbots Langley in the County of Hertford. In the House of Lords he tried to stop the House of Commons abandoning Law French and replacing it with English. To Raymond, ending the traditional language might lead to other 'modernisations' such as Welsh for courts in Wales. However his opposition failed and in 1733 the courts were anglicised. His tomb in Abbots Langley was sculpted by Peter Scheemakers.

== Family ==
He married Anne, the daughter of Sir Edward Northey of Woodcote Green, Epsom, Surrey, attorney-general and had one son. In 1720 he built for himself a country house and estate at Langleybury 2 miles (3.2 km) north of Watford in Hertfordshire. His monogram and his cipher, a griffin in a crown, can still be seen on the exterior of the building.

== Arms ==
Coat of arms of Robert Raymond, 1st Baron Raymond

Crest
Out of a ducal coronet Proper a demi dragon Ermine.
Escutcheon
Quarterly 1st and 4th Sable a chevron between three eagles displayed Argent on a chief Or between two fleurs-de-lis a rose Gules (Raymond) 2nd and 3rd Or a fess Gules on a bend Sable five mullets Or.
Supporters
On either side an eagle reguardant Proper armed and collared Or.
Motto
Aequam Servare Mentem

Parliament of Great Britain
| Preceded by Charles Mason; Richard Harnage | Member of Parliament for Bishop's Castle; 1710 – 1715; With: Richard Harnage | Succeeded by Charles Mason; Richard Harnage |
| Preceded by Sir Gilbert Dolben; Henry Holmes | Member of Parliament for Yarmouth (Isle of Wight); 1715 – 1717; With: Henry Holmes | Succeeded by Anthony Morgan; Sir Theodore Janssen, Bt |
| Preceded by Francis Herbert; Humphrey Walcot | Member of Parliament for Ludlow; 1719 – 1722; With: Humphrey Walcot | Succeeded by Abel Ketelby; Acton Baldwyn |
| Preceded by Sir Gilbert Heathcote, Bt; Sidney Godolphin | Member of Parliament for Helston; 1722 – 1724; With: Walter Carey | Succeeded by Sir Clement Wearg; Walter Carey |
Legal offices
| Preceded by Robert Eyre | Solicitor General for England and Wales; 1710 – 1714 | Succeeded by Sir Nicholas Lechmere |
| Preceded by Sir Nicholas Lechmere | Attorney General for England and Wales; 1720 – 1724 | Succeeded by Sir Philip Yorke |
| Preceded by John Pratt | Lord Chief Justice of the King's Bench; 1725 – 1733 | Succeeded by Sir Philip Yorke |
Peerage of Great Britain
| New creation | Baron Raymond; 1731 – 1733 | Succeeded by Robert Raymond |
