= Nash Mills railway bridge =

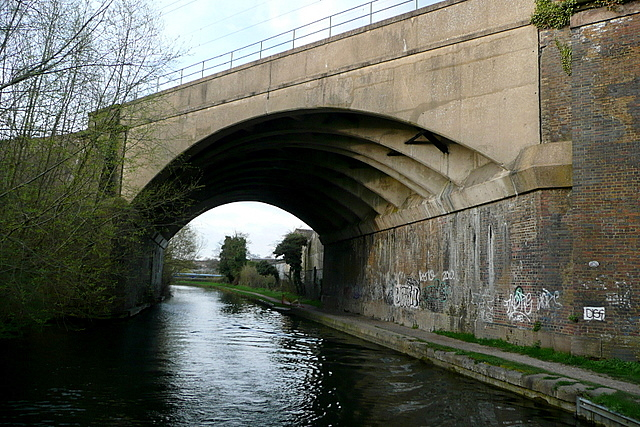
- The west side of the bridge viewed from the canal
- Coordinates: 51°43′28″N 0°26′59″W
- Carries: West Coast Main Line
- Crosses: Grand Union Canal
- Locale: Nash Mills, Hertfordshire
- Maintained by: Network Rail
- Heritage status: Grade II listed building

Characteristics
- Material: Cast iron, concrete
- No. of spans: 1

History
- Opened: 1837

Nash Mills railway bridge carries the West Coast Main Line railway over the Grand Union Canal to the west of Nash Mills, Hemel Hempstead in Hertfordshire, Eastern England. The bridge was built to the designs of Robert Stephenson for the London and Birmingham Railway and completed in 1837. Although modified, it is still in use and is Grade II listed building.

== Design ==
The bridge was built in cast iron, one of the earliest railway bridges to use the material. It is a skew arch carrying the railway across the Grand Union Canal. It has a span of 66 feet (20 metres) and a width of 88 feet (27 metres). The arch is made up of six segmental ribs. It had decorative open spandrels and ornate iron parapet. It has substantial brick abutments which terminate in heavy stone capitals.

The bridge was strengthened in the 1960s by encasing it in concrete though the original outline is still visible and some of the ironwork can be seen from the underside. The parapet was rebuilt at the same time and a decorative band added below it in the concrete. Gordon Biddle, a railway historian, described the original as "a handsome bridge" and lamented that it was "a great pity that some other means of strengthening it could not be found".

== History ==
The bridge was designed by Robert Stephenson for the London and Birmingham Railway (now the southern part of the West Coast Main Line) and was complete for the railway's opening in 1837. It is the last in a series of engineering works along a long embankment which starts just north of Watford Tunnel and is a short distance north-west of Abbots Langley bridge, another original skew bridge on the same line. It was widened in 1858 when the railway was quadruple-tracked.

John Cooke Bourne illustrated the bridge as part of his series of lithographs documenting the construction of the London and Birmingham. The image depicts the bridge as-built and continues the theme of Bourne's work in contrasting the modernity of the railway with earlier forms of transport, such as the canal it crosses.

The bridge remains in use and was designated a Grade II listed building in 1985. Listed building status affords legal protection from unauthorised demolition or modification.
