= Devil's Dyke, Hertfordshire =

Prehistoric defensive ditch

Coordinates: 51.80673°N 0.28555°W

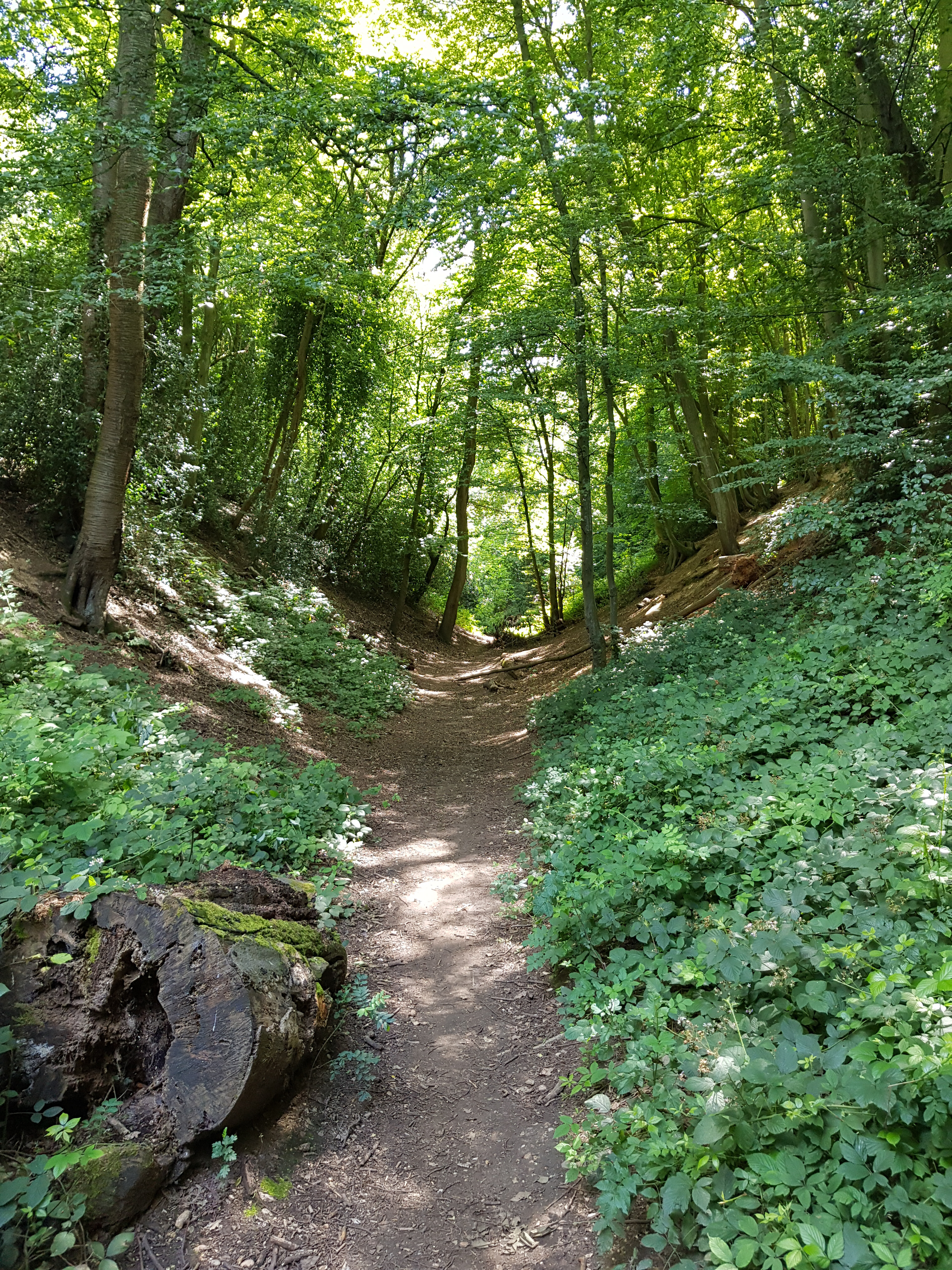
The Devil's Dyke, Hertfordshire

Devil's Dyke is the remains of a prehistoric defensive ditch which lies at the east side of the village of Wheathampstead, Hertfordshire, England. It is protected as a Scheduled Monument. It is generally agreed to have been part of the defences of an Iron Age settlement belonging to the Catuvellauni tribe of Ancient Britain. It has possible associations with Julius Caesar's second invasion of Britain (54 BC)

== Description ==
Historic England refers to the Devil's Dyke as being part of a much larger site. Some other sources are more specific as to what sort of earthwork it may be, suggesting that the dyke protects one side of an oppidum (a large fortified Iron Age settlement) covering about 40 ha. The area is marked as a "Belgic oppidum" on Ordnance Survey maps.

Today two sections of ditch remain. The western section, adjacent to the village, is the Devil's Dyke. It is around 30 m wide and 12 m deep at its largest. A smaller ditch to the east is known as "The Slad". A moat continues the line of the ditch to the south of The Slad. Unlike Devil's Dyke, the Slad is located on private property, and is not accessible to the public.

The River Lea could have served as a defensive barrier on the northern side of the settlement, so that a ditch was not needed there.

Although recent archaeological studies have proven the main 'devil's dyke' ditch, the deepest part of what was assumed to be defensive ditches, around the settlement, was in fact the only part to have such ditches. It was thought that ditches in other parts of the site had been lost to erosion, but tests have shown the rest of the settlement would have been indefensible by ditches alone, and that what had been thought to be ditches were just minor boundaries surrounding the majority of the settlement, perhaps to keep animals from straying outside rather than defending the interior from attack.

== History ==
=== Dating ===
Belgic pottery was found in the 1970s during construction of the Wheathampstead by-pass which goes through the northern part of the putative oppidum to cross the River Lea. The Catuvellauni are often linked to Belgic Gaul. There was also a smaller amount of pre-Belgic pottery.

=== Conservation and access ===
Visitors are welcome to visit the Devil's Dyke. According to a plaque at one entrance to the dyke, the land was presented by Lord Brocket in 1937 on the occasion of the coronation of King George VI and Queen Elizabeth.

Other parts of the Wheathampstead earthwork are not accessible. According to Historic England, there is a risk to the site from arable ploughing. It is included in the Heritage at Risk Register.

=== Possible association with Julius Caesar ===
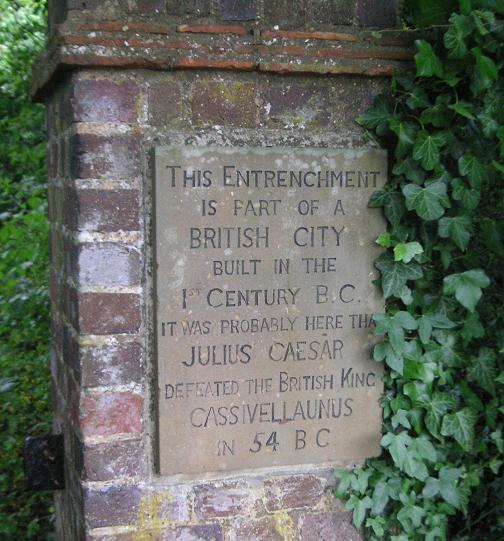
Sign at the entrance to the Dyke

The site is a candidate for the strongly defended place where Julius Caesar fought Cassivellaunus in 54 BC, as described in his firsthand account De Bello Gallico. There are other possible locations for the stronghold (for example, Ravensburgh Castle, Hexton) and the historical evidence neither supports nor disproves the claim of the Devil's Dyke.

Caesar gave details of crossing the Thames and proceeding north towards the stronghold. He possibly crossed the Thames at Brentford, although other locations have been posited.

The theory that Wheathampstead was attacked by Caesar was supported by Sir Mortimer Wheeler, who carried out a 1932 excavation of the site. The sign at the entrance to the Dyke states that it is the probable place (based on the assertions of Sir Mortimer), which has led to the claim often being repeated as an established fact. No archaeological evidence exists of 1st-century military activity in Hertfordshire.

== Related sites ==
=== Hertfordshire ===
Some archaeologists, including Sir Barry Cunliffe, suggest that the Wheathampstead earthwork was connected with other local earthworks, particularly Beech Bottom Dyke, four miles to the south west. This theory implies a single defensive earthwork running from the River Lea to the River Ver, and possibly a large enclosed settlement. The fortifications were probably erected by King Cunobelinus to define areas of land around their tribal centre at Verlamion – the predecessor of the later Roman city of Verulamium.

== See also ==
- Deil's Dyke - A linear earthwork in south-west Scotland.
