= Baron Raymond =

Barony in the Peerage of Great Britain

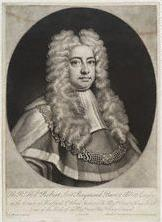
Robert Raymond, 1st Baron Raymond.

Lord Raymond, Baron of Abbots Langley in the County of Hertford, was a title in the Peerage of Great Britain. It was created on 15 January 1731 for Sir Robert Raymond, Lord Chief Justice of the King's Bench. The title became extinct on the death of the second Baron in 1756.

== Barons Raymond (1731) ==
- Robert Raymond, 1st Baron Raymond (1673–1733)
- Robert Raymond, 2nd Baron Raymond (c. 1717–1756)
