= Verlamion =

Pre-Roman town near St Albans, England

Coordinates: 51°45′N 0°22′W

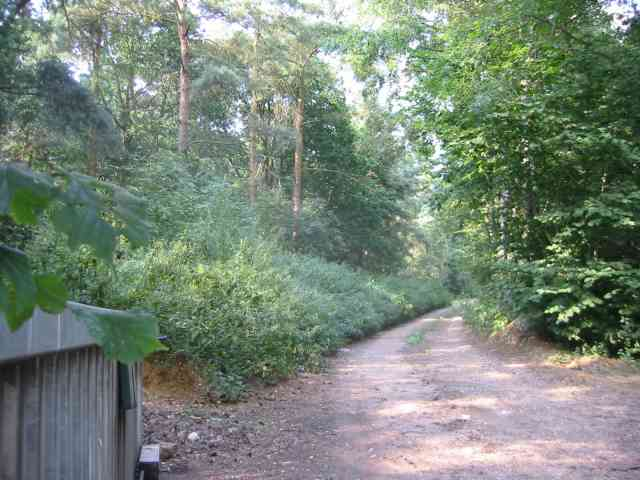
Prae Wood, which is near to or on the site of Verlamion

Verlamion, or Verlamio, was a settlement in Iron Age Britain. It was a major centre of the Catuvellauni tribe from about 20 BC until shortly after the Roman invasion of AD 43. It is associated with a particular king, Tasciovanus. Its location was on Prae Hill, 2 km to the west of modern St Albans.

== Etymology ==
The etymology is uncertain: perhaps the name means "settlement above the marsh", or "[settlement of] Uerulamos [Broad-Hand]" in Brittonic. The elements *wer- and *lamā- meant "high" and "hand" respectively in Common Brittonic (*-i- is adjectival, denoting a place, and *-on is the usual o-stem neuter suffix). An alternative etymology may be guessed via back construction from modern Welsh, as bank of the (River) Ver, where Ver could mean short, or be a contracted form of Veru, or Berw, meaning a foaming or bubbling river (cf Berwyn).

== Iron Age ==
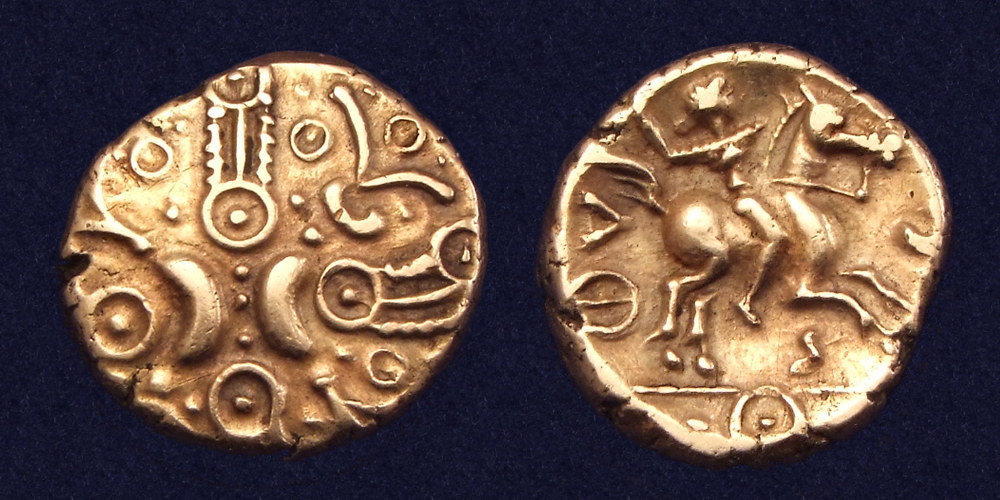
Coin of Tasciovanus, minted at Verlamion

It is believed that the tribal capital was moved to the site by Tasciovanus (around 25 to 5 BC). The location of the previous capital is not certain, but it is possible to speculate on the basis of documentary evidence (Caesar's Commentarii de Bello Gallico) and archaeological evidence for Iron Age sites in the area. One possible site was favoured by Sir Mortimer Wheeler, a feature called the Devil's Dyke a few miles to the north near Wheathampstead, which has been interpreted as part of the defences of a large oppidum bordering the River Lea.

Tasciovanus was the first king to mint coins at Verlamion, beginning around 10 BC. There is evidence that the oppidum may have had a significant ritual function.

== Roman and later history ==
The Latinised name for the oppidum, and the Roman city which replaced it, was Verulamium.

== Local museum ==
Verulamium Museum, which mainly showcases Roman items, has a pre-Roman section.

== See also ==
- Verulamium, under the Romans
