= Hitchin Museum and Art Gallery =

Museum in Hitchin, Hertfordshire, England

Coordinates: 51.9482°N 0.2816°W

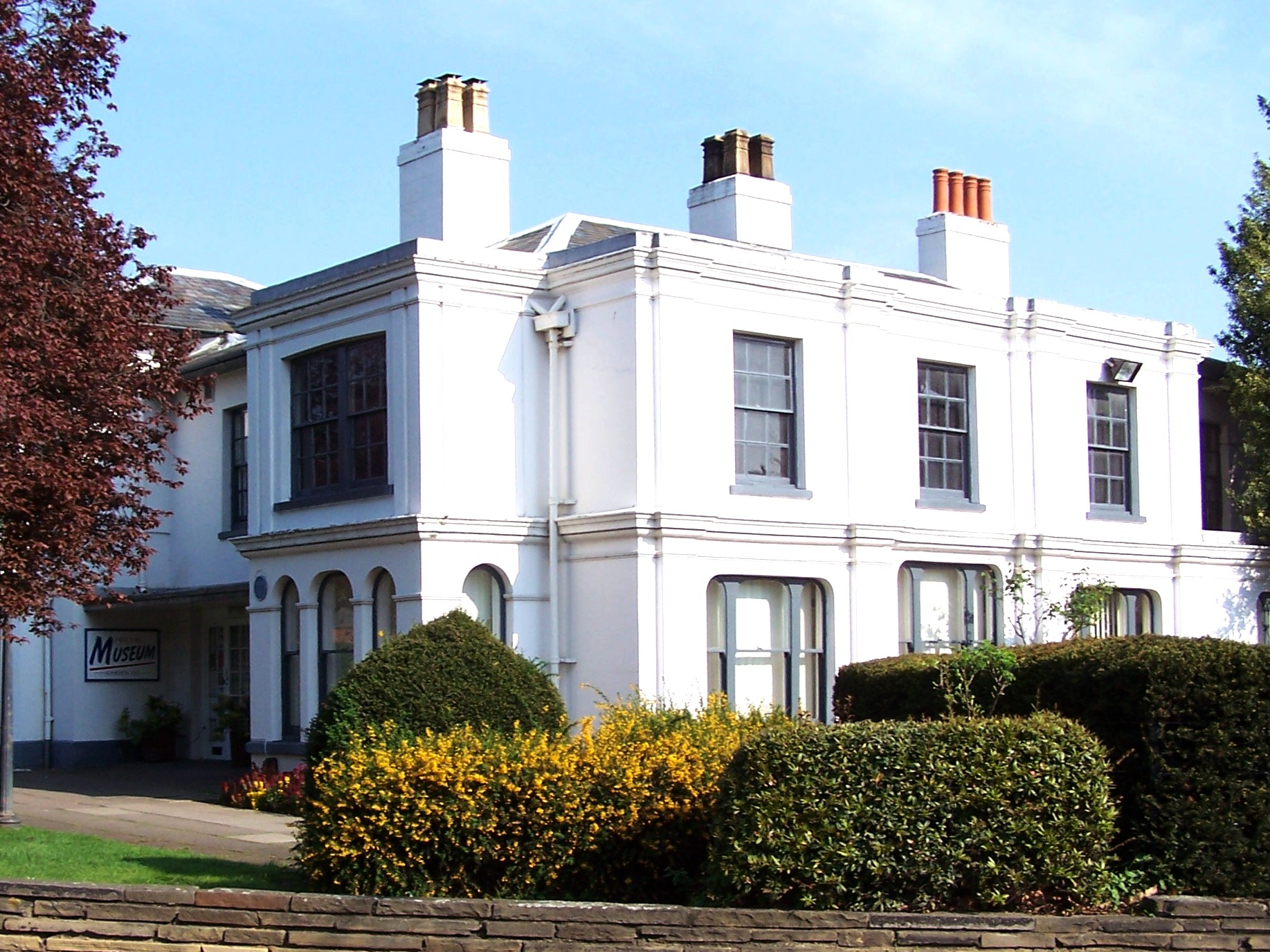
Hitchin Museum and Art Gallery; built as a private house in 1825 and opened as a museum in 1941

The Hitchin Museum and Art Gallery was a local history museum in Hitchin, Hertfordshire, England, with an extensive collection that told the story of the town’s social history and of the rural industries that contributed to its prosperity.

== History ==
Hitchin Museum was founded in 1939 by the Hitchin & District Regional Survey Association in a house given by Ralph & Hubert Moss, grocers in the town. The house, formerly known as Agadir and subsequently as Charnwood, was built in 1825.

The building opened in 1939 as a Public Library and in 1941 the top floor opened as a Museum. The Library, run by Hertfordshire County Council since the late 1960s, is now in an extension next door. Although it was initially run by Hitchin Urban District Council, since its dissolution in 1974, the Museum has been run by North Hertfordshire District Council, together with Letchworth Museum and Art Gallery and, during the late 1970s and early 1980s, Royston Museum and the First Garden City Heritage Museum.

=== Closure ===
In 2004–5, North Hertfordshire District Council undertook a Fundamental Service Review of its Museum Service. Although it found that visitors greatly valued all aspects of the service (Hitchin Museum and Art Gallery, Letchworth Museum & Art Gallery, the Education Service with its School Loans scheme, the Archaeology and the Natural History Services), the two museums were both described as unfit for purpose and the Museums Resource Centre at Burymead Road in Hitchin as outdated and inefficient.

The review had five main recommendations, one of which was to close the two existing museums at Letchworth and at Hitchin, and instead run a museum and gallery on a single town-centre site. A feasibility study was commissioned to investigate the possibility of converting Hitchin Town Hall to museum use. The North Hertfordshire Museum, which was designed by Buttress with museum layout by Mather & Co., opened in July 2019.

== See also ==
- British Schools Museum
- Letchworth Museum & Art Gallery
- List of museums in Hertfordshire
