= Ye Olde Fighting Cocks =

Pub in St Albans, England

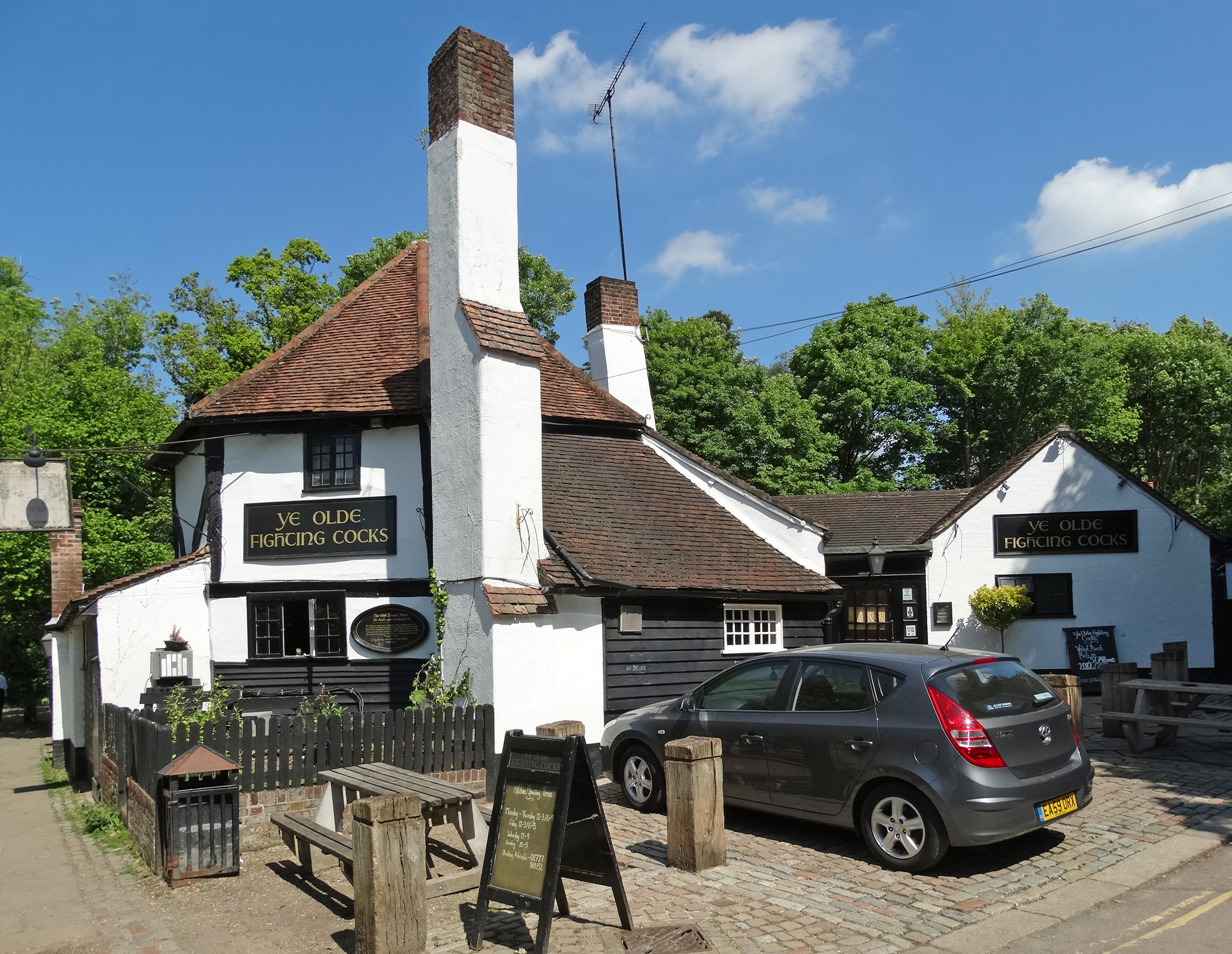
- Ye Olde Fighting Cocks – the view from the River Ver, 2014

- Location within Hertfordshire
- Former names: The Round House, Three Pigeons

General information
- Location: 16 Abbey Mill Lane, St Albans, Hertfordshire AL3 4HE
- Coordinates: 51°44′56″N 0°20′50″W

Listed Building – Grade II
- Official name: The Fighting Cocks Public House
- Designated: 8 May 1950
- Reference no.: 1347100

Ye Olde Fighting Cocks is a pub in St Albans, Hertfordshire, England. It is one of several pubs that lay claim to being the oldest in England, claiming to have been in business since 793 AD. Its claim to that date is somewhat uncertain: the building is described by Historic England as being of 16th-century appearance, and the earliest date for which it might have been licensed is 1756. Other pubs such as Ye Olde Man & Scythe in Bolton, Greater Manchester, and Ye Olde Trip to Jerusalem in Nottingham also make unproved claims to being the oldest. Ye Olde Fighting Cocks was once listed as the oldest in England by the Guinness World Records, but the record was withdrawn from consideration in 2000 because it was deemed impossible to verify.

Elsewhere in St Albans, the White Hart and the Fleur de Lys (currently called The Snug) are believed to have been trading as inns in the late medieval period.

== Location ==
The pub is at the end of Abbey Mill Lane beside the River Ver, just outside the perimeter of Verulamium Park, not far from St Albans Cathedral in Hertfordshire.

== History ==
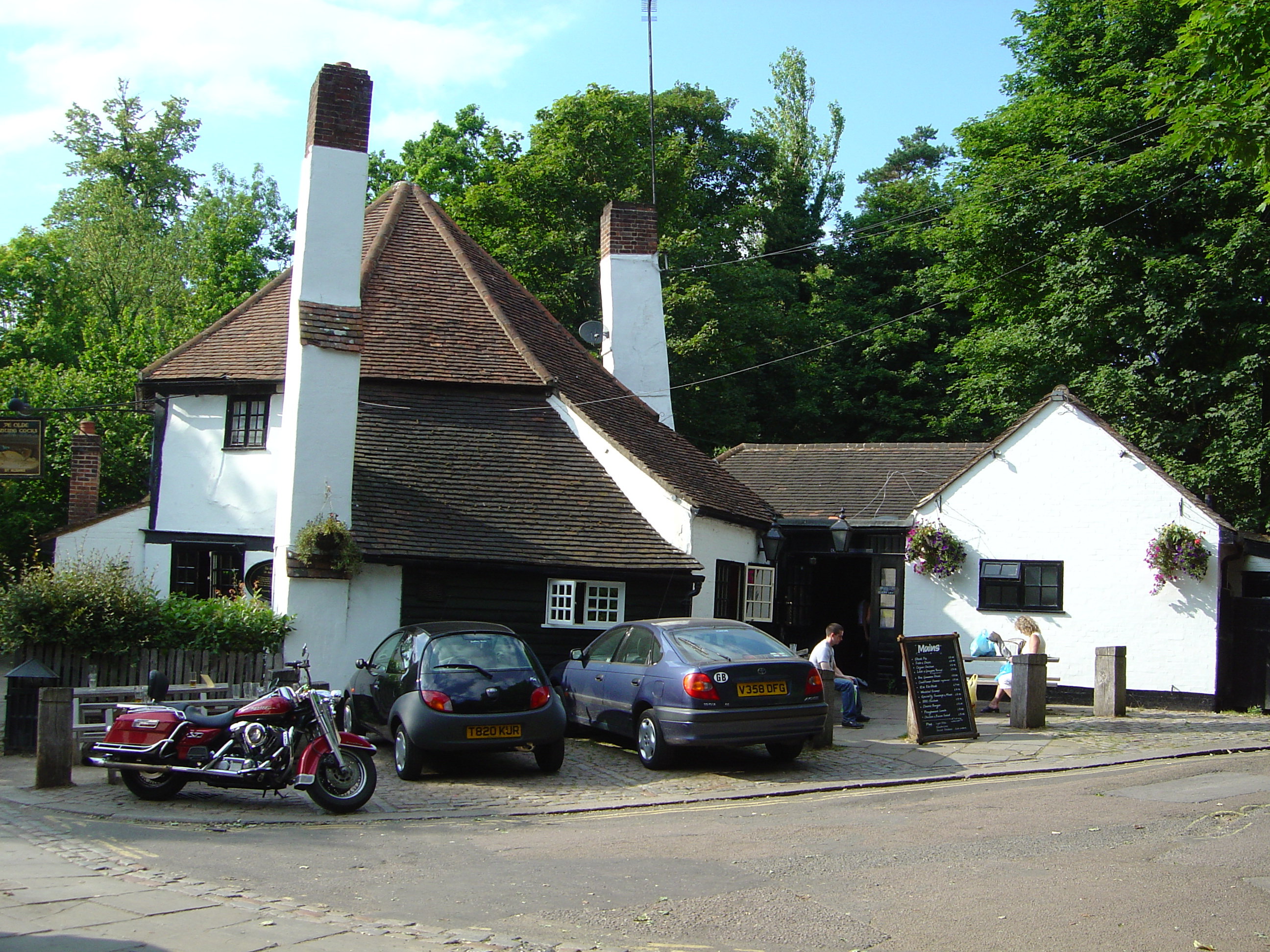
Ye Olde Fighting Cocks – the view from the car park (2003)

The first mention of the building is in 1622 when a Thomas Preston "...bought an old pigeon house and pulled the same down and erected it ... and made thereof a tenement which is now called the Round House." The pigeon house had been built in the 11th century in a location nearer the cathedral.

The building, in its current location, was originally known as The Round House but there is no record of it being licensed as a public house under that name. The first known reference to it being an alehouse is in 1756, when it appears to be trading as The Three Pigeons. Around 1800, its name changed to the Fighting Cocks, perhaps in reference to the sport of cock fighting which was popular at the time and which may have taken place in the main bar area. The prefix "Ye olde..." is a late Victorian affectation. It is known by locals as 'The Fighters' or 'The Cocks'.

In 1950, the building was Grade II listed.

In 2015, PETA wrote to the pub's landlord and its owners, Mitchells & Butlers, requesting that they change the name due to its cockfighting association. The request was declined.

In February 2022, the pub went into administration, though the owner was hopeful that a buyer would be found for the business. In March 2022, the former manager and head chef joined a new team to take over the pub's lease.

== Architecture ==
The main structure is free-standing and has an octagonal appearance, attributable to its original use as a pigeon house. It has been added to over the years but the original timber-framed structure is clearly visible. It was originally close to St Albans Cathedral (when it was St Albans Abbey) and was moved to the present site sometime after the dissolution of the Abbey in 1539. Its foundations are claimed to be even older, dating from around 793, but again this is dubious. It is claimed that there are tunnels running between the cathedral and the pub's beer cellars which were once used by monks.

As with many old buildings, the ceilings are quite low. An original bread-oven is next to one of the fireplaces. It has a large beer garden with different seating arrangements, as well as seats out the front.

== In popular culture ==
The Cocks was featured in an exterior scene in "The Sins of the Fathers", a 1990 episode of the ITV series Inspector Morse. The setting was the beer garden along the River Ver, with the pub's large sign plainly visible in the background.
