= North Hertfordshire Museum =

Museum in Hitchin, England

Coordinates: 51.949°N 0.280°W

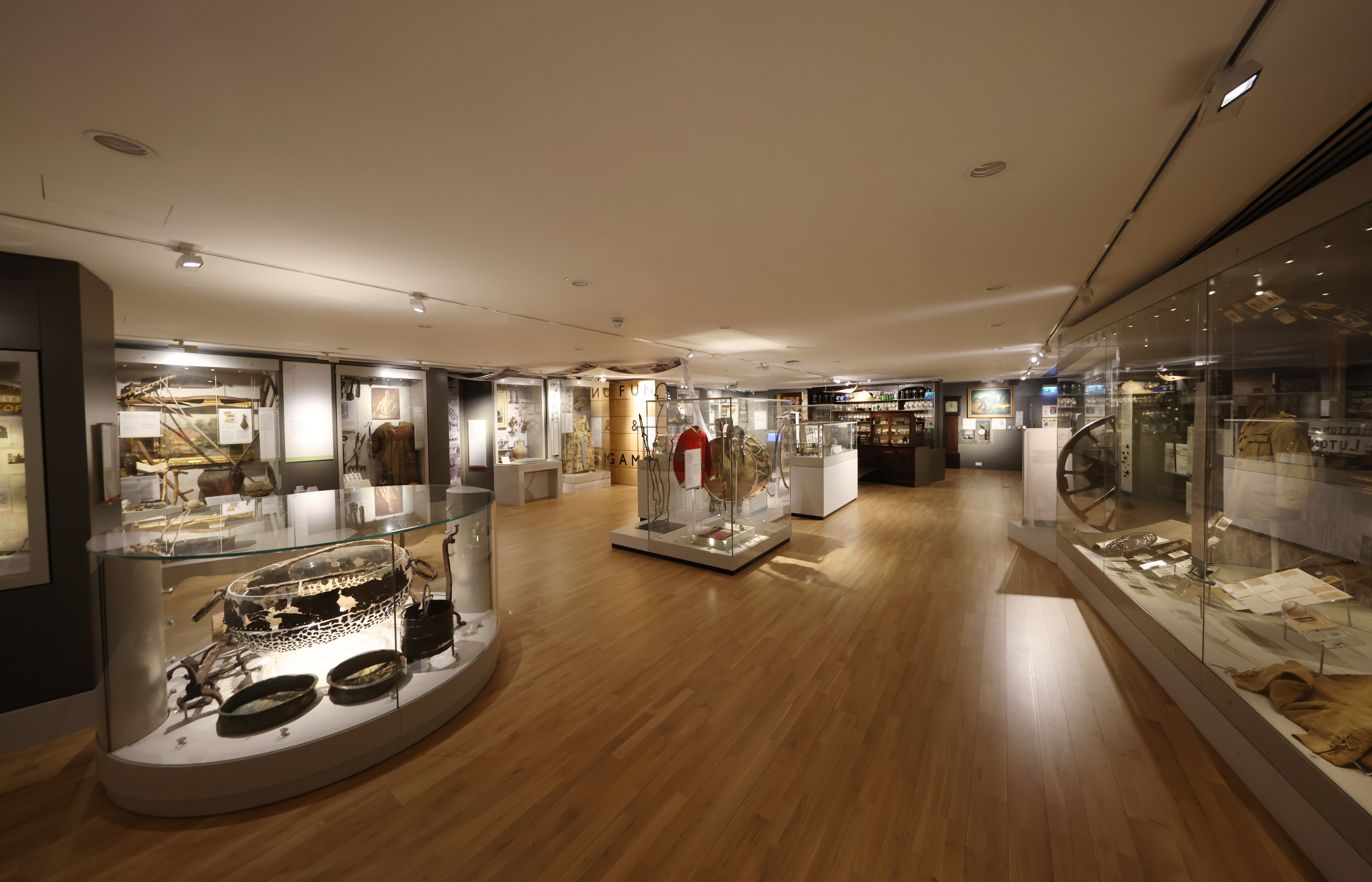
The museum's Living in North Herts Gallery

North Hertfordshire Museum is a museum that displays collections relating to local history and heritage. It is located adjacent to the refurbished Hitchin Town Hall on Brand Street, Hitchin, Hertfordshire.

== History ==
In 2004–5, North Hertfordshire District Council undertook a Fundamental Service Review of its Museum Service. Although it found that visitors greatly valued all aspects of the service (Hitchin Museum and Art Gallery, Letchworth Museum & Art Gallery, the Education Service with its School Loans scheme, the Archaeology and the Natural History Services), the two museums were both described as unfit for purpose and the Museums Resource Centre at Burymead Road in Hitchin as outdated and inefficient.

The review had five main recommendations, one of which was to close the two existing museums at Letchworth and at Hitchin, and instead run a museum and gallery on a single town-centre site. A feasibility study was commissioned to investigate the possibility of converting Hitchin Town Hall to museum use. The museum, which was designed by Buttress with museum layout by Mather & Co., opened in July 2019.

== The galleries ==
The museum has three galleries containing permanent exhibitions – Discovering North Herts, Living in North Herts and The Terrace Gallery – and one containing temporary exhibitions:

=== Discovering North Herts ===
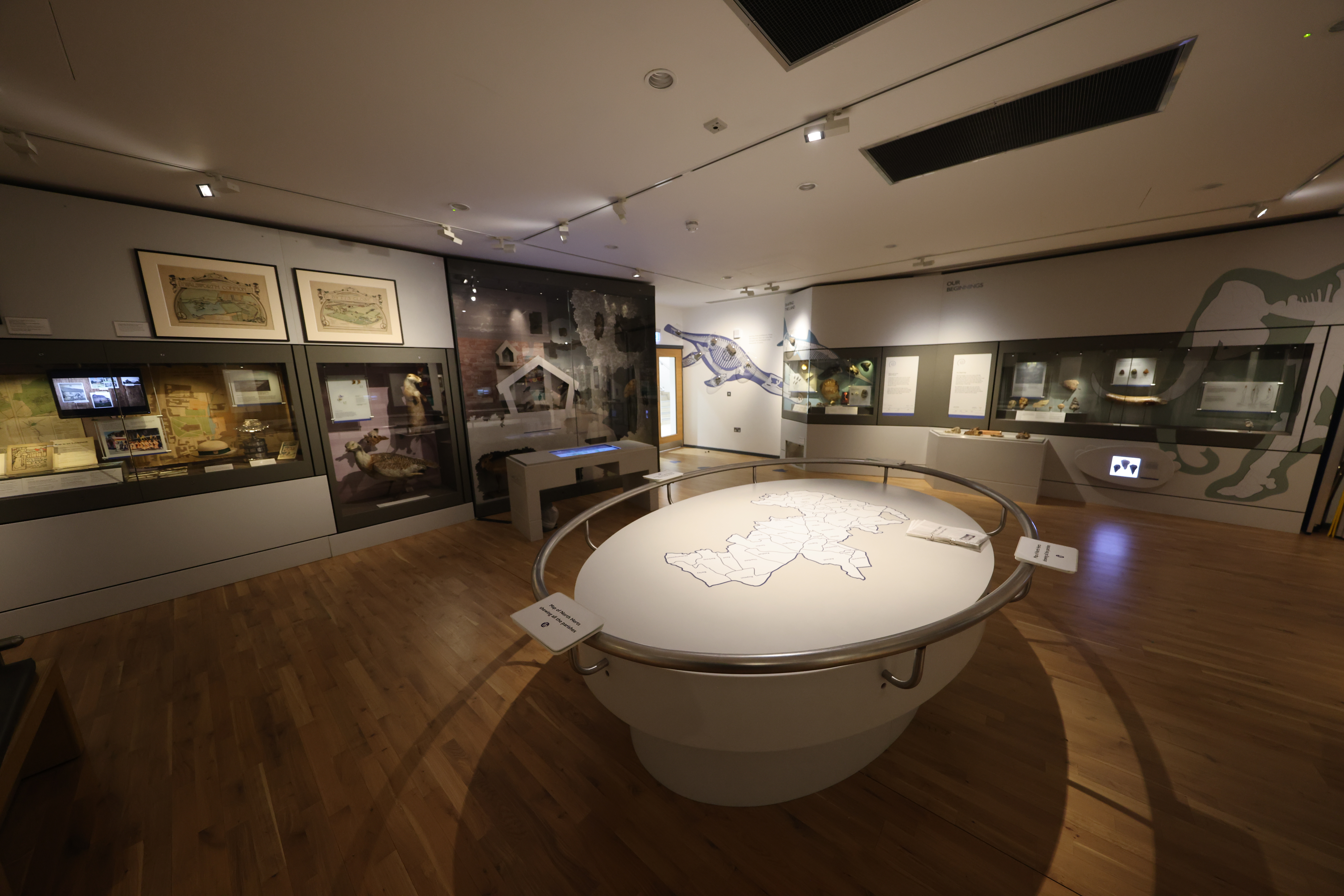
Discovering North Herts gallery

This gallery follows the story of the district in chronological order. It highlights how and why North Hertfordshire has transformed over time, from 90 million years ago when it was underwater, to the urban planning that has shaped the district today.

=== Living in North Herts ===
This gallery is arranged thematically, to draw out similarities and differences between how people lived at different times in the past. The principal themes include Living off the Land, Fun and Games, Making and Selling, and Cradle to Crave.

=== The Terrace Gallery ===
This gallery is also arranged thematically. It includes the Football Collection, the first established in England by Vic Wayling, secretary of Hitchin Town F.C., opening in 1956 and transferred to Hitchin Museum and Art Gallery in the 1980s. There is also a case Collecting the World, in which objects from every continent are displayed.

=== The Exhibition Gallery ===
This gallery is used to display temporary exhibitions.

== See also ==
- Hitchin Museum and Art Gallery
- Letchworth Museum & Art Gallery
- List of museums in Hertfordshire
