= List of museums in Hertfordshire =

This list of museums in Hertfordshire, England contains museums which are defined for this context as institutions (including nonprofit organizations, government entities, and private businesses) that collect and care for objects of cultural, artistic, scientific, or historical interest and make their collections or related exhibits available for public viewing. Also included are non-profit art galleries and university art galleries. Museums that exist only in cyberspace (i.e., virtual museums) are not included.

Name	Image	Town/City	Type	Summary
1940s Experience		Bushey	Living	1940s period home during World War II, history of RAF Bushey Hall; part of the Lincolnsfields Children's Centre
Art and Design Gallery		Hatfield	Art	part of the University of Hertfordshire
Ashwell Village Museum		Ashwell	Local	local history
Baldock Museum		Baldock	Local	local history
British Schools Museum		Hitchin	Education	Complex of schools showing education in Britain from 1810 until 1969, Victorian life,
Broadway Gallery		Letchworth	Art	Visual arts organisation, part of the Letchworth Garden City Heritage Foundation.
Bushey Museum		Bushey	Multiple	Local history, culture, art
Cromer Windmill		Cromer	Mill	
Dacorum Heritage		Dacorum	Local	information, local history, based in a museum store in Berkhamsted, open by appointment
Datchworth Museum		Datchworth	Local	information, local history, located in a former blacksmith's shop
de Havilland Aircraft Museum		London Colney	Aviation	Formerly the Mosquito Aircraft Museum, restored de Havilland military aircraft
Elstree and Boreham Wood Museum		Borehamwood	Local	local history
Frogmore Paper Mill		Hemel Hempstead	Industry	Industrial 'exploration' centre built around a working paper mill
Gorham House		St Albans	Historic house	Palladian mansion and adjacent ruins of older house
International Garden Cities Exhibition		Letchworth	History	story of the Garden city movement and Letchworth’s legacy and influence on town planning across the world
Hatfield House Hatfield Palace		Hatfield	Historic house Royal Palace	17th century Jacobean house and gardens 15th medieval Tudor style
Henry Moore Perry Green		Much Hadham	Art	Estate with sculptures by Henry Moore and his studios
Hertford Museum		Hertford	Local	Local history, culture, art
Knebworth House		Knebworth	Historic house	Victorian Tudor Gothic house, gardens and grounds
Lowewood Museum		Hoddesdon	Local	local social history, geology
Mill Green Museum		Hatfield	Mill	Working water-driven 18th-century flour mill and local history museum
Museum at One Garden City		Letchworth	History	Focusing on local history and showcasing items from the Garden City Collection
Museum of St Albans		St Albans	Local	Local history, archaeology, art
Much Hadham Forge Museum		Much Hadham	Historic house	working blacksmith forge, Victorian cottage and garden
Natural History Museum at Tring		Tring	Natural history	Formerly the Walter Rothschild Zoological Museum, features stuffed mammals, birds, reptiles and insects
North Hertfordshire Museum		Hitchin	Multiple	opening in 2019, local history, culture
Potters Bar Museum		Potters Bar	Local	information, local history
Redbourn Museum		Redbourn	Local	local history, located in a former silk mill
Redbournbury Mill		Redbourn	Mill	Working water-driven flour mill
Royston & District Museum and Art Gallery		Royston	Multiple	local history, art, ceramics and glass, archaeology
Shaw's Corner		Ayot St Lawrence	Historic house	Operated by National Trust, home of playwright George Bernard Shaw
South Mill Arts (previously Rhodes Arts Complex)		Bishop's Stortford	Multiple	Includes an art gallery and the Bishop's Stortford Museum with local history exhibits, and personal artefacts and collections of Cecil Rhodes
St Albans Organ Theatre		St Albans	Music	theater organs and mechanical musical instruments
Stevenage Museum		Stevenage	Local	local history, culture
Three Rivers Museum		Rickmansworth	Local	local history, culture
Tring Local History Museum		Tring	Local	Local history
Verulamium Museum		St Albans	Archaeology	Artefacts and remains of the Roman city
Ware Museum		Ware	Local	local history, culture
Watford Museum		Watford	Local	Local history, culture, fine art, firefighting, Watford F.C.
Welwyn Roman Baths		Welwyn	Archaeology	Ruins of Roman baths and other artefacts

== Defunct museums ==
- Buntingford Heritage Centre, Buntingford
- Hitchin Museum and Art Gallery, Hitchin, closed in 2012, collections transferred to North Hertfordshire Museum
- Kingsbury Watermill, no longer a museum, now a restaurant
- Letchworth Museum & Art Gallery, Letchworth, closed in 2012, collections transferred to North Hertfordshire Museum

== See also ==
- Category:Tourist attractions in Hertfordshire
