= Local Government Act 1999 =

Act of the Parliament of the United Kingdom

Local Government Act 1999 (Note: Section 36.)
- Act of Parliament
- Parliament of the United Kingdom
- Long title: An Act to make provision imposing on local and certain other authorities requirements relating to economy, efficiency and effectiveness; and to make provision for the regulation of council tax and precepts.
- Citation: 1999 c. 27
- Territorial extent: England and Wales (Note: Section 35(1).)

Dates
- Royal assent: 27 July 1999
- Commencement: 10 August 1999 (Note: Section 27.)
Other legislation
Amends	Housing Associations Act 1985; Social Security Administration Act 1992; Police Act 1996
Amended by	Public Audit (Wales) Act 2004; Cities and Local Government Devolution Act 2016; Policing and Crime Act 2017

Status: Amended

Text of statute as originally enacted

Revised text of statute as amended

The Local Government Act 1999 (c. 27) is an act of the Parliament of the United Kingdom, applicable to a wide range of local authorities in England and Wales. It was promoted by a Labour government, in the early years of the First Blair ministry, and was described, in 2000, as "arguably most significant local government legislation for a decade".

Part 1 of the act introduced legal requirements for continuous improvement of services within a Best Value framework, expressed in terms of economy, efficiency and effectiveness. It mandated a transition from previous requirements for compulsory competitive tendering. It also introduced a regime of audit and inspection to assure the implementation and operation of Best Value, coupled with new powers of central government intervention in authorities failing to meet Best Value requirements.

Part 2 of the act replaced a prior system of universal caps on authority precepts and taxes, in favour of discretionary reserve capping powers, providing flexibility to the Secretary of State in deciding whether to intervene in authority budgeting.

Provisions of the act apply to local authorities (i.e. local councils) as well as police, fire, waste, passenger transport, national park, development agency, and other authorities.

== Background ==
The UK, in common with a number of other countries, began from the 1970s to reconsider hitherto settled local government models. Increasing economic uncertainty arising from 1970s oil shocks and stagflation, and concerns about an ageing population, were coupled with a Conservative strategy to shrink the size, cost, and activities of government. For example, Conservative politician Nicholas Ridley compared the "fat and bloated" local authorities of the United Kingdom to the relatively "slim" contract cities of the United States.

Conservative governments from 1979 to 1997 enacted a series of legislative measures mandating compulsory competitive tendering for the provision of the range of services delivered by local authorities, starting with construction and highways maintenance work under the Local Government, Planning and Land Act 1980; refuse collection, street cleaning and building, and ground maintenance under the Local Government Act 1988; leisure services under a Statutory Instrument (SI), The Local Government Act 1988 (Competition in Sports and Leisure Facilities) Order 1989; vehicle fleet maintenance and on-street parking activities under another SI, The Local Government Act 1988 (Competition) (Defined Activities) Order 1994; and then moving to a range of white-collar activities of authorities, such as property and housing management, construction planning, finance, IT and personnel, under a series of SIs in 1994 and 1995. This market-led approach reflected a belief that the private-sector was more capable of delivering services than the public sector.

By the late 1990s, there was political consensus that there existed a need to reinvigorate local democracy, and from 1997 the incoming Labour administration pursued a Modernising Government agenda based on federalised and devolved principles - including Scottish and Welsh devolution from 1998. Best Value sought to provide a framework for authorities to develop higher quality and lower cost services meeting the established needs of their communities.

Best Value ostensively replaced previous requirements for compulsory competitive tendering (CCT) to a wider range of authority services, and introduced requirements for consultation about services required by communities; challenge as to how services are delivered; comparison to elicit best practice; and competition to deliver value for money - collectively termed the '4 Cs' of Best Value. The focus is on outcomes - what is achieved, in a wide societal context, by the actions of authorities - rather than upon outputs - what authorities produce.

== Sources ==
- O'Connell, Gerry (2000). "An Introduction to the Local Government Act 1999". The Police Journal: Theory, Practice and Principles. 73 (4): 299–322. doi:10.1177/0032258X0007300402. S2CID 151514554.
- Vincent-Jones, Peter (January 2000). "Central-Local Relations under the Local Government Act 1999: A New Consensus?". The Modern Law Review. 63 (1): 84–103. doi:10.1111/1468-2230.00251. JSTOR 1097465.
