= Letchworth Museum & Art Gallery =

Former museum in Letchworth, England

Coordinates: 51.9767°N 0.2296°W

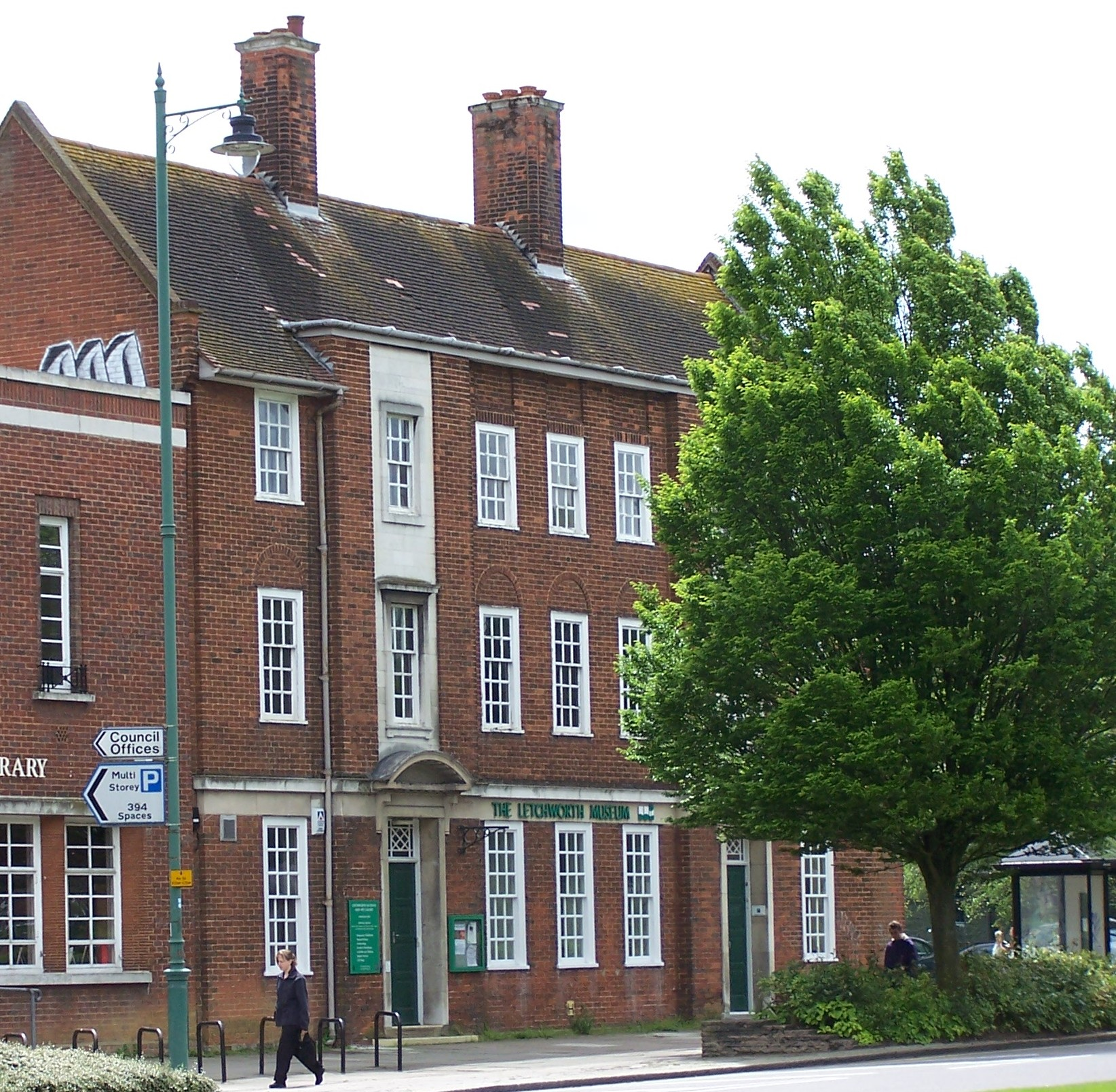
Letchworth Museum and Art Gallery; designed by Barry Parker and opened in 1914

Letchworth Museum and Art Gallery was a museum in Letchworth, Hertfordshire, England. It had permanent displays dedicated to the natural history of North Hertfordshire, including the famous black squirrel, as well as its archaeology from remote prehistory to the turn of the twentieth century.

== History ==
Letchworth Museum and Art Gallery was founded in 1914 to house the collections being amassed by the Letchworth and District Naturalists’ Society. The building was designed as a single storey structure by Richard Barry Parker, one of the principal architects of the early Garden City movement. It was enlarged in the 1920s and extended to the rear in 1960–63 to designs by Courtenay Melville Crickmer (who had designed Letchworth Library, next door, in 1938).

Its first curator, W Percival Westell (1874–1943), was a well-known author of works on natural history and archaeology. Appointed as Honorary Curator in 1914, the post became salaried in 1928 and he remained as Curator until his death. During the time spent at the museum he wrote 84 books and gave 145 radio talks for the BBC, mostly on natural history. Westell's successor at the museum was Albert T Clarke, who was in post from 1944 to 1968.

Although run initially by the Letchworth and District Naturalists’ Society, it was transferred to Letchworth Urban District Council in 1939. Since the dissolution of the Urban District Council in 1974, the Museum has been run by North Hertfordshire District Council.

=== Closure ===
In 2004–05, North Hertfordshire District Council undertook a Fundamental Service Review of its Museum Service. Although it found that visitors greatly valued all aspects of the service (Hitchin Museum and Art Gallery, Letchworth Museum & Art Gallery, the Education Service with its School Loans scheme, the Archaeology and the Natural History Services), the two museums were both described as unfit for purpose and the Museums Resource Centre at Burymead Road in Hitchin as outdated and inefficient.

The review had five main recommendations, one of which was to close the two existing museums at Letchworth and at Hitchin, and instead run a museum and gallery on a single town-centre site. A feasibility study was commissioned to investigate the possibility of converting Hitchin Town Hall to museum use. The North Hertfordshire Museum, which was designed by Buttress with museum layout by Mather & Co., opened in July 2019.

== See also ==
- Hitchin Museum and Art Gallery
- List of museums in Hertfordshire
