= Water race =

Water race may refer to:

- Aqueduct (water supply), a watercourse constructed to convey water
- Boat racing, a race carried out by driving boats on water
- Swimming (sport), a race carried out by swimming through water

== See also ==
- Mill race, a current of water that turns a water wheel
