= Waffle House (disambiguation) =

Waffle House is an American breakfast chain.

Waffle House may also refer to:

- "Waffle House" (song), by the Jonas Brothers
- Waffle House Index, unofficial severity index
- Nashville Waffle House shooting
- Kingsbury Watermill, a waffle restaurant in England

== See also ==
- Pancake house
