= Kingsbury Watermill =

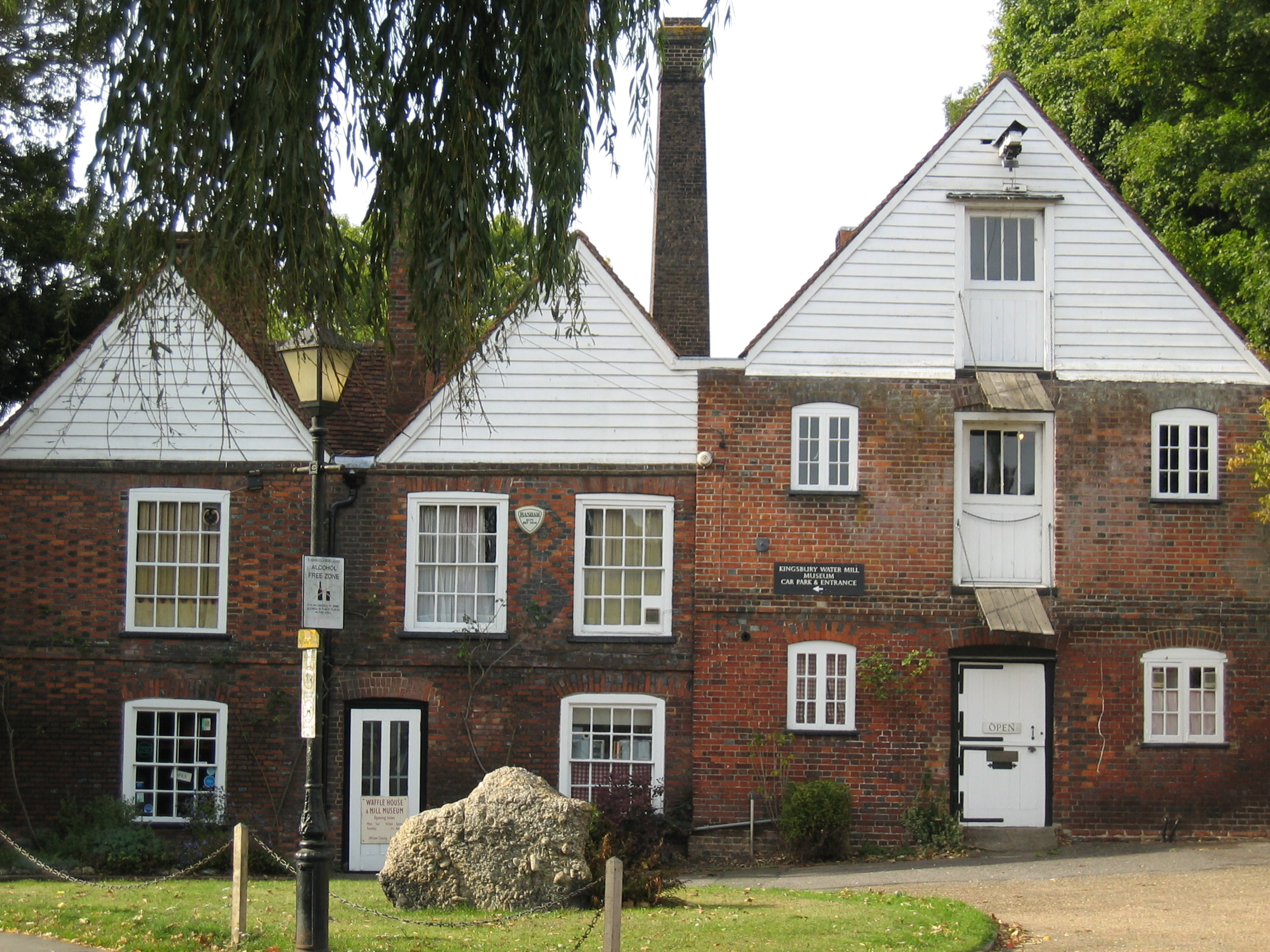
- Kingsbury Watermill

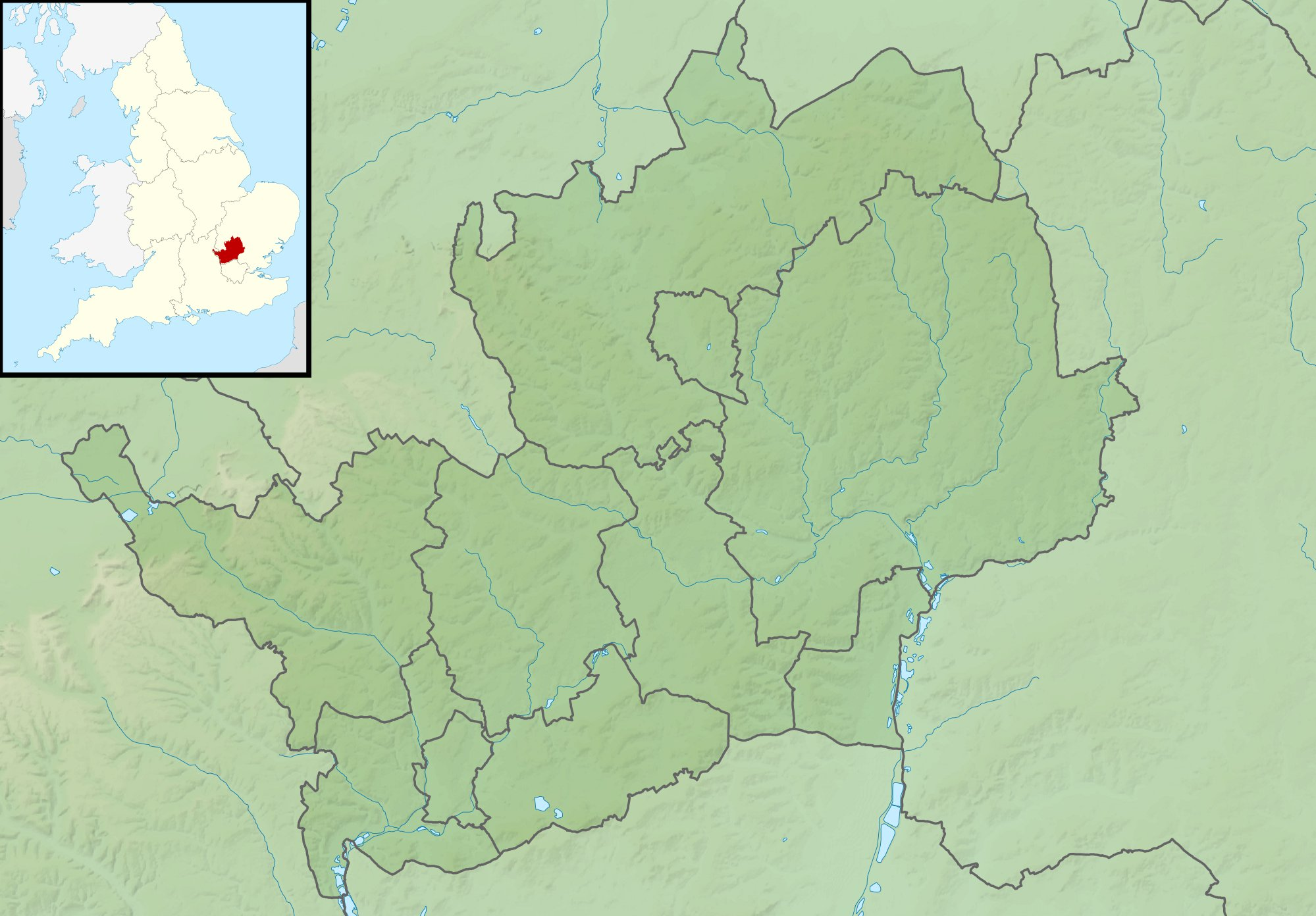
- Location within Hertfordshire

General information
- Type: Watermill
- Location: On the River Ver, St Albans, St Albans (unparished), England
- Coordinates: 51°45′16.2″N 0°21′8.28″W
- Opened: c. 1570

Kingsbury Watermill is a Grade II listed former watermill on the River Ver in St Albans, Hertfordshire, England. Since 1978 it has operated as The Waffle House, a restaurant specialising in Belgian waffles.

== History ==
There is no certain date of inception for Kingsbury Mill, however, the large quantity of timber used in its construction would point to it having been built during the Elizabethan era, on a site previously used for milling. A neighbouring Grade II* listed barn has been dated to 1373, and as a result it is likely this was used to support the mill that stood on the site. During the eighteenth century a Georgian brick facade added. Since this time, the Mill has remained largely unchanged.

Kingsbury Mill stood in land belonging to St Albans Abbey at the time of the dissolution of the monasteries across the country. The mill is again referred to 1568 when a "watermill and free fishery in St Michael's" were conveyed to Sir Nicholas Bacon by John and Frances Machell. Following the death of Sir Nicholas and his eldest son Anthony, the Gorhambury Estate, and thus the mill, passed on to noted scientist and statesmen Francis Bacon. Following Francis' death, the estate was bequeathed to Thomas Meautys who was married to Anne Bacon, the great granddaughter of Sir Nicholas. The estate was purchased from Meautys by Sir Harbottle Grimston, the forerunner of the Earl of Verulam title.

The mill was modernised in the 19th century, and is reported to have been fully functional up until the 1960s. The milling machinery was subsequently restored in 1972, which included two pairs of millstones and a breastshot wheel.

== Present day ==
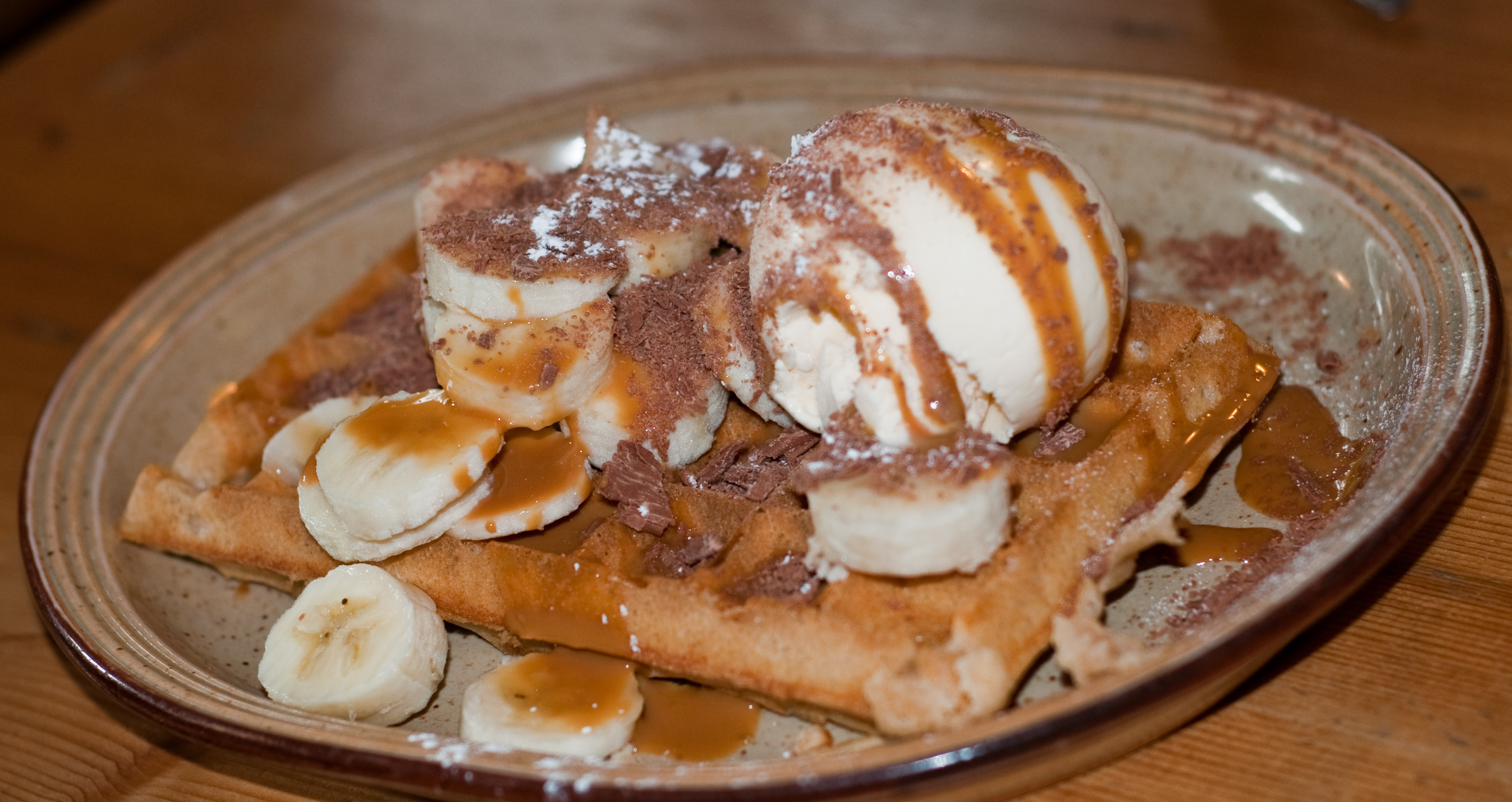
Banoffee waffle, 2009

No longer used as a functioning mill, Kingsbury has been home to a restaurant, The Waffle House (not the US chain of the same name), since 1978. The restaurant specialises in sweet and savoury Belgian waffles, the flour for which is milled at the Redbournbury Mill, approximately 3 miles away, which was also formerly part of the Gorhambury Estate. The large block of stone at the front of the mill is Hertfordshire puddingstone.

== See also ==
- List of museums in Hertfordshire
- Mill Green Watermill, Hatfield, Hertfordshire
- Redbournbury Mill, Redbournbury
- St Albans Museums
