= Thomas Geoffry Lucas =

British architect (1872–1947)

Thomas Geoffry Lucas (6 June 1872 – 3 October 1947), generally known as Geoffry Lucas, but often found incorrectly spelt as Geoffrey Lucas, was a 20th-century English architect. He is perhaps best known for his work in connection with the garden city movement, but was also active in other areas, including the design of churches and church fittings.

== Biographical summary ==
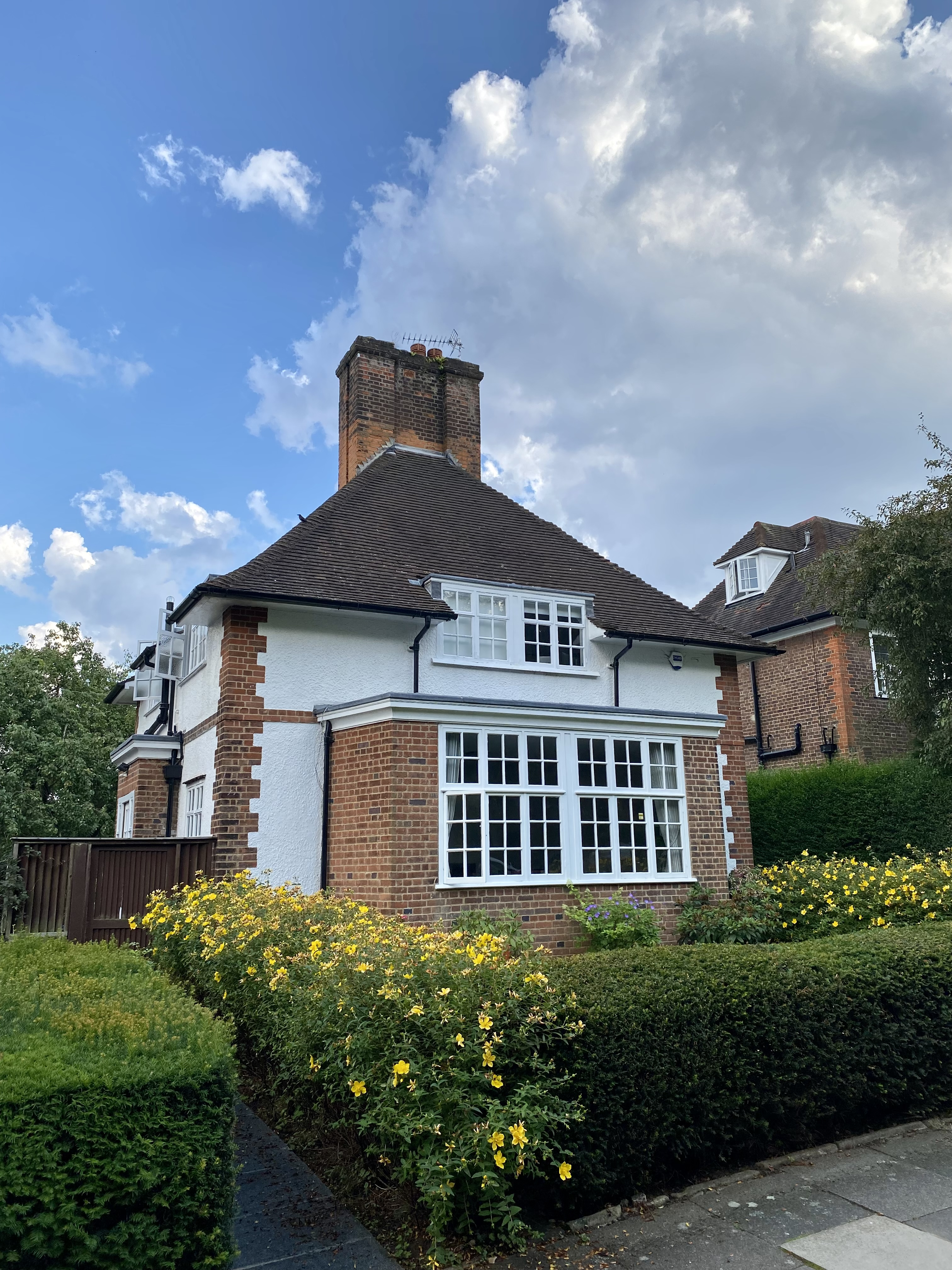
10 Southway in Hampstead Garden Suburb, designed by Lucas in 1910 for the artist Tom Roberts

Lucas was born in 1872 and articled to Walter John Nash Millard of Hitchin, Hertfordshire from 1889. After academic and professional training between 1889 and 1891 he held a number of posts as an assistant in various offices before setting up his own independent practice in Hitchin in 1895. Between then and 1919 he carried out much work, mainly domestic or ecclesiastical "in a manner marked by good taste and well-studied detail", to use the words of his obituarist and former partner. Many of his commissions were within Hertfordshire and included a number of private houses for high-status patrons.

In 1903, in partnership with Sydney Cranfield, Lucas entered the competition for designs for a garden city at Letchworth which would make a reality of the ideas of Ebenezer Howard. The competition was won by Richard Barry Parker and Raymond Unwin, but the design submitted by Lucas and Cranfield has been described as "an intelligent and pleasing plan, its main disadvantage being the separation of the north and south residential areas". Nevertheless, Lucas was responsible for the design of some of the houses in Letchworth, notably a group of cheap cottages at Paddock Close which were described as "The £150 House". Of these houses he said, "Although simple, an effort has been made to obtain dignity, and an architectural treatment, without extravagance". Whilst a similarity in style can be seen, their simplicity forms a marked contrast with the more opulent houses which he was designing for private patrons at this time (for details, see section 2.1 below).

A further embodiment of the garden city movement was Hampstead Garden Suburb. The Hampstead Garden Suburb Trust was formed in 1906 and the plans were prepared by Parker & Unwin, Unwin being architect to the Trust from 1906 to 1914. Lucas was one of a number of architects who made important contributions (listed in section 2 below). Hampstead Garden Suburb was followed by Romford Garden Suburb at Gidea Park where development began in 1910. Many of the architects who had contributed to Hampstead also contributed to Gidea Park, including Lucas, whose house at 54 Parkway took first prize among a group of more expensive exhibition houses.

Lucas also showed a keen interest in the traditions of English church building throughout his life. It is an interesting comment on his versatility that at the same time as he was designing modern houses for private patrons and for the garden suburbs he was also producing church work in a completely medieval idiom in the form of chancel screens for Downham Market (1910) and the rather more impressive one for Swansea St Gabriel (1914). By this date he had come under the influence of Percy Dearmer: the frontispiece to the 1907 edition of the latter's The Parson's Handbook was a pen-and-ink drawing by Lucas which showed an English altar of the type promoted by Sir Ninian Comper and Dearmer. Lucas was associated with the Warham Guild following its formation in 1912 to provide church furnishings in the style favoured by Dearmer and he carried out further ecclesiastical work under its auspices.

During World War I Lucas and other architects who had been associated with Unwin in the garden suburb movement joined him in the development of a great new settlement at Gretna designed to house workers in the large munitions factory that had been developed nearby on the Solway Firth. As part of this project he is known to have worked under Unwin in the construction of All Saints Episcopal church.

After the war, in 1919, Lucas joined Henry Vaughan Lanchester to form the partnership of Lanchester & Lucas. This was enlarged in 1923 by the addition of Lucas's former partner, Thomas Arthur Lodge, to form Lanchester, Lucas & Lodge. Lucas took charge of the firm's work in housing and other branches during the absence of Lanchester in India. Work undertaken by the partnership during the time that Lucas was associated with it included commissions for Leeds University, St Bartholomew's Hospital, Messrs Bovril, Beckenham Town Hall and various housing schemes and buildings in India. In particular Lucas was closely connected with the design of a church at Hubballi in India. He withdrew from the partnership in 1930, possibly following some disagreement with its other members. It seems that he then retired from professional work but continued to pursue his personal interests.

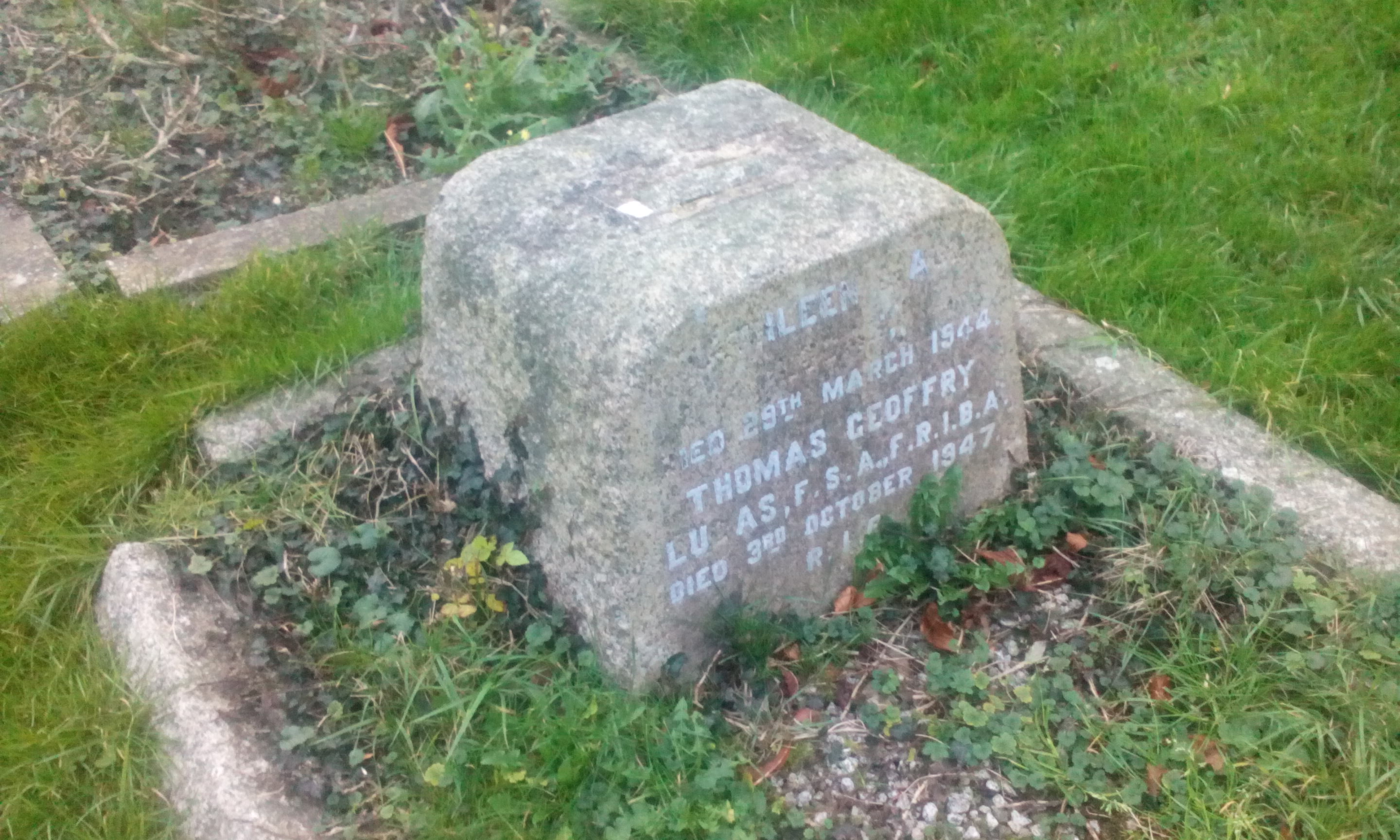
Lucas' tomb in the churchyard of Old St Mary's.

In his later years Lucas's interest in ecclesiastical architecture increased, with an emphasis on the antiquarian side. He developed a theory that all medieval church plans were based on an underlying system of squares and he spent much time in measuring churches in pursuit of this idea.

Lucas was elected an Associate of the Royal Institute of British Architects in 1899 and a Fellow in 1911. In his later years he was also a member of the Society of Antiquaries. He died at his home in Walmer, Kent on 3 October 1947 and was buried in the churchyard of Old St Mary's in the town.

== Summary of Lucas's known work ==
=== Garden city buildings ===
- 1–8 Paddock Close, Letchworth, 1905
- 16–18 Erskine Hill, Hampstead, c1910
- 60–82 Lucas Square, Hampstead, 1909
- 9–47 Willifield Way, Hampstead, 1908–09
- 10 Southway, Hampstead, 1910
- 54 Parkway, Gidea Park, 1911
- 16 Bigwood Road Hampstead c1910

=== Other domestic architecture ===
- House at Royston, Hertfordshire, 1902
- Cottage at Lady Gardeners School, Glynde, Sussex, 1906
- Radwell Mill, Ashwell, Hertfordshire, major additions to 19th-century building, 1907
- Yewlands, Hoddesdon, Herts, 1910
- Private commissions for houses at Ponders End and elsewhere in Hertfordshire, 1902–1909

=== Public buildings ===
- Hitchin Town Hall, Hertfordshire (with Edward William Mountford), which includes the Lucas Room, c1901
- Unspecified bank at Hitchin, c1900
- Lancaster Town Hall (with Edward William Mountford), 1907
- Beckenham Town Hall, 1931–1932 (as a partner in Lanchester, Lucas & Lodge)
- Unspecified work at St Bartholomew's Hospital (as a partner in Lanchester, Lucas & Lodge)
- Unspecified work at Leeds University (as a partner in Lanchester, Lucas & Lodge), 1926

=== Ecclesiastical work ===
- Rood screen in St Edmund's church, Downham Market, Norfolk, 1910
- Rood screen in St Gabriel's church, Brynmill, Swansea, 1914
- Assistant to Raymond Unwin at All Saints Episcopal church, Gretna, Scotland, 1917
- Church at Hubballi, India (perhaps Church of Holy Name), 1928
- Lucas is also known to have submitted designs for new churches at Grantham, Lincolnshire (1905) and at Woolmer Green, Hertfordshire (1899) but there is no evidence that he was successful in either case.

== Legacy ==
Hitchin Town Hall has room named in honour of Thomas Geoffry Lucas. The motif above the fireplace is thought to represent the Lucas family crest.

== Sources ==
- W P D Stebbing, 'Obituary, Thomas Geoffry Lucas', Archaeologia Cantiana, v 60 (1947), p 133
- A S Gray, Edwardian architecture : a biographical dictionary (London : Duckworth, 1985), p 237
- Directory of British architects, 1834–1914. Updated and expanded ed. / by Antonia Brodie [et al.] (London: Continuum, 2001) v 1, p 961. ISBN 0-8264-4963-8
- 'Thomas Geoffry Lucas (or Geoffry Lucas)'in Dictionary of Scottish Architects (http://www.scottisharchitects.org.uk/architect_full.php?id=202231; accessed 2009-01-29

H V Lanchester, 'Obituary', Journal of the Royal Institute of British Architects, ser 3, v 55 (1947/8), p 39
