= River Ver =

River in Hertfordshire, England

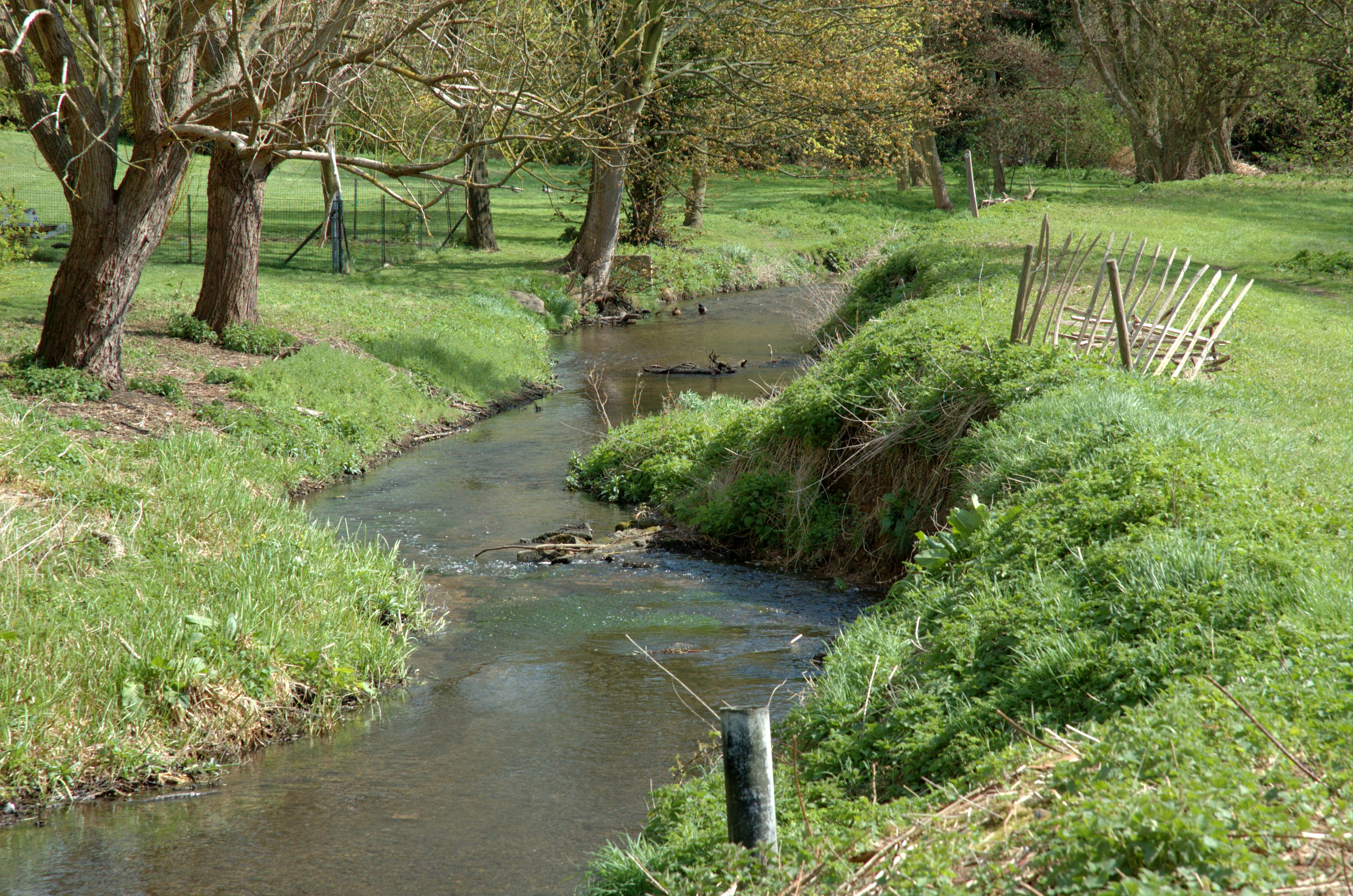
- River Ver in St Albans

- Location of mouth in Hertfordshire

Location
- Country: England
- County: Hertfordshire
- Towns: St Albans
- Settlements: Kensworth, Markyate, Flamstead, Redbourn, Park Street, Bricket Wood

Physical characteristics
- Source
  - location: Kensworth Lynch
  - coordinates: 51°51′05″N 0°29′03″W
- Mouth: River Colne
  - location: Bricket Wood
  - coordinates: 51°41′58″N 0°21′00″W
- Length: 28.251 km (17.554 mi)

Basin features
- Progression: Ver, Colne, Thames, North Sea
- River system: Thames
- Tributaries
  - right: Red Bourne

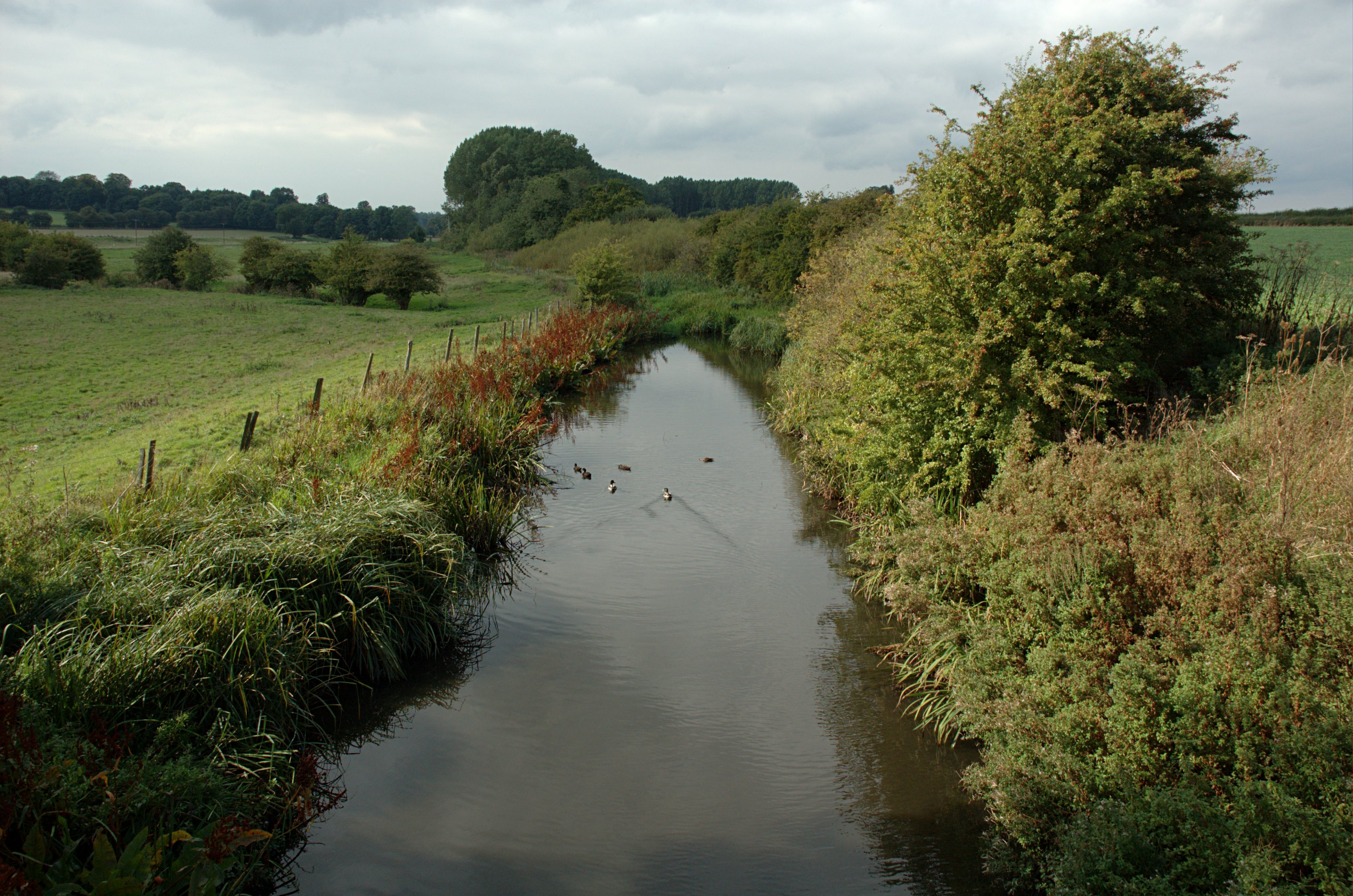
River Ver west of St Albans

The Ver is a 28 km (17 mi) long chalk stream in Hertfordshire, England. It is a tributary of the River Colne.

== Course ==
The source is in the grounds of Lynch Lodge, Kensworth Lynch on the west side of the A5 trunk road and stays on the west side for some half mile or so. It then crosses through a culvert into Markyate Cell, afterwards crosses under the A5 in culvert and runs through Markyate. The river exits above ground at the southern end of Markyate, and on through Flamstead, Redbourn, St Albans and Park Street, finally joining the River Colne at Bricket Wood.

The Ver is a chalk stream, which is partly a seasonal winterbourne north of Redbourn. However, many of its natural features have been compromised as a result of being canalised during the construction of the artificial lakes at Verulamium Park in St Albans in the 1930s following the archaeological excavations of Verulamium by Sir Mortimer Wheeler and his wife Tessa. During the 1960s and 1970s it suffered serious problems as a result of water extraction upstream. Although these abated temporarily after the closure of one of the pumping stations, as of 2005 the upstream part of the river dries up completely during the summer, and the rest of the river may suffer the same fate within a few years; compared to the current situation with the "great flow of water" that was reported to exist in 1885, with a depth of 12 ft (3.7 m) at Dolittle Mill on the Redbourn Road . In 2004 a proposal for remedial work was being developed for the St Albans lakes.

== Notable buildings ==
The Romans built the city of Verulamium alongside the Ver at a time when it was navigable, expressing their preference for building in valleys rather than on hills.

The bridge in St Michael's Street, adjacent to Kingsbury Mill, dates from 1765 and is believed to be the oldest extant bridge in Hertfordshire. It is Grade II listed. According to a contemporary account of the Second Battle of St Albans in 1461, another bridge existed on this site previously (recorded in 1505 as Pons de la Maltemyll - Malt Mill Bridge). It is thought that the Romans had built a bridge here by the 3rd century AD. The ford alongside the current bridge, which is known to have existed for 2,000 years and is traditionally believed to be Alban's crossing point on his way to his execution, was substantially restored in 2001 by local residents' associations.

Ye Olde Fighting Cocks public house in St Albans, which claims to be the oldest pub in England, was moved in the early 1600s to the side of the Ver next to the Abbey Mill at the bottom of the Abbey Orchard, and remains in this location today.

== Industry ==
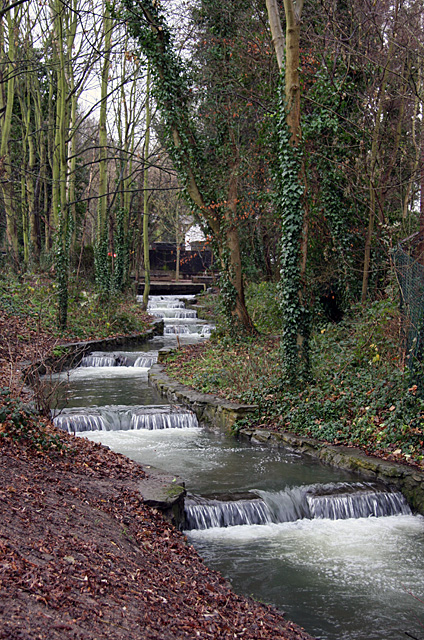
Channelled section of the Ver near an old mill site in St. Albans.

The river south of Redbourn has been the site of several watermills down the centuries, mainly for grinding corn but also put to such diverse uses as paper making, fulling cloth, silk spinning and diamond lapping. Eleven mills are known to have existed, of which a number can still be seen today, either as mills (working or otherwise), or converted (for example into private homes or parts of public houses). Particularly worthy of note are:

- Dolittle Mill. Closed in 1927 and since demolished. It is reputed to have been the site of a miracle. The early 15th century chronicler Thomas Walsingham, a monk at St Albans Abbey, records that a child fell into the mill race and was thrown out by the wheel, apparently dead. The child's mother prayed to Saint Alban, offering money if the child's life were restored, and her prayer was answered.

- Redbournbury Mill, between Redbourn and St Albans. A recently restored flour mill, still producing flour commercially, is periodically open to the public. However, these days it is powered by a vintage Crossley diesel engine. It is a Grade II* listed building.

- Kingsbury Watermill. A 16th century mill in St Albans which was previously a malt mill belonging to St Albans Abbey. Its origins are known to go back to at least 1194; indeed, it may be one of the three mills in St Albans recorded in the Domesday Book (1086). Today it is restored and open as a museum. It is another Grade II* listed building.

- Moor Mill, in Smug Oak Lane, Bricket Wood. Now a public house and conference centre. The water wheel and other workings can still be seen inside during normal opening hours.

- Shafford Mill, a 19th century mill on the Redbourn Road, is now a private house. It is a Grade II listed building.

Disused watercress beds can be seen at various points along the river's length (most notably in the unspoilt stretch between Redbourn and St Albans): the entire Ver valley was a national centre for the watercress growing industry. The poplar and willow plantations around Pre Mill and the former Pre Hotel on the A5183 (just west of St Albans on the edge of the Gorhambury Estate), which are a significant feature of the landscape, indicate a more modern industry: that of cricket bat manufacturing.

== Water quality ==
The Environment Agency measure water quality of the river systems in England. Each is given an overall ecological status, which may be one of five levels: high, good, moderate, poor and bad. There are several components that are used to determine this, including biological status, which looks at the quantity and varieties of invertebrates, angiosperms and fish. Chemical status, which compares the concentrations of various chemicals against known safe concentrations, is rated good or fail.

Water quality of the River Ver in 2019:

Section	Ecological Status	Chemical Status	Overall Status	Length	Catchment	Channel
Ver	Moderate	Fail	Moderate	28.251 km (17.554 mi)	146.351 km^{2} (56.506 sq mi)	
