= Hitchin Town Hall =

Municipal building in Hitchin, Hertfordshire, England

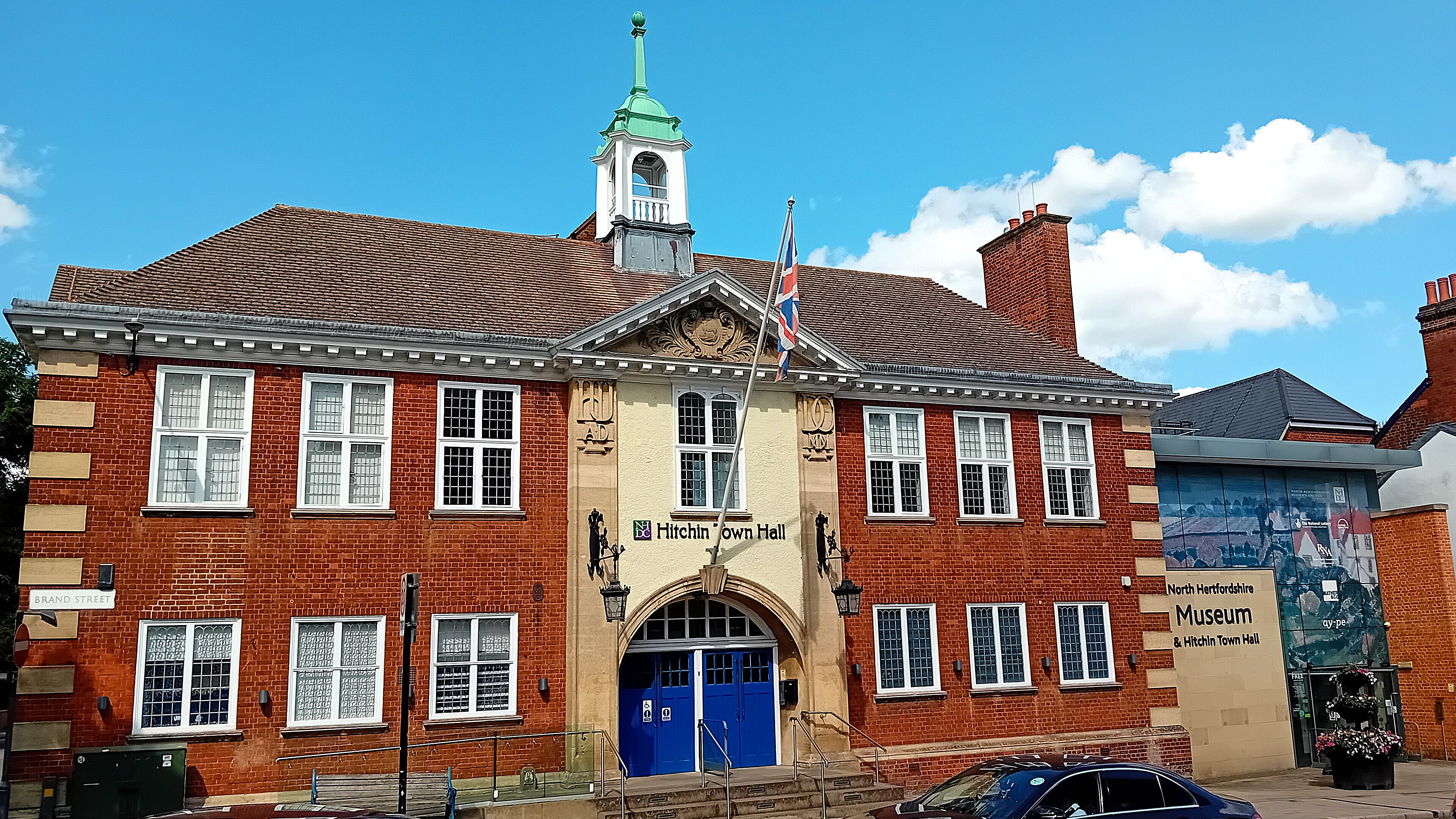
- Hitchin Town Hall

- Shown in Hertfordshire
- 51.9494°N 0.2795°W
- Location: Brand Street, Hitchin

History
- Built: 1901

Site notes
- Architect(s): Edward Mountford and Thomas Lucas
- Architectural style: Neo-Georgian style

Listed Building – Grade II
- Official name: Town Hall
- Designated: 14 October 2010
- Reference no.: 1394494

Hitchin Town Hall is a municipal structure in Brand Street, Hitchin, Hertfordshire, England. The town hall, which was the headquarters of Hitchin Urban District Council, is a Grade II listed building.

== History ==
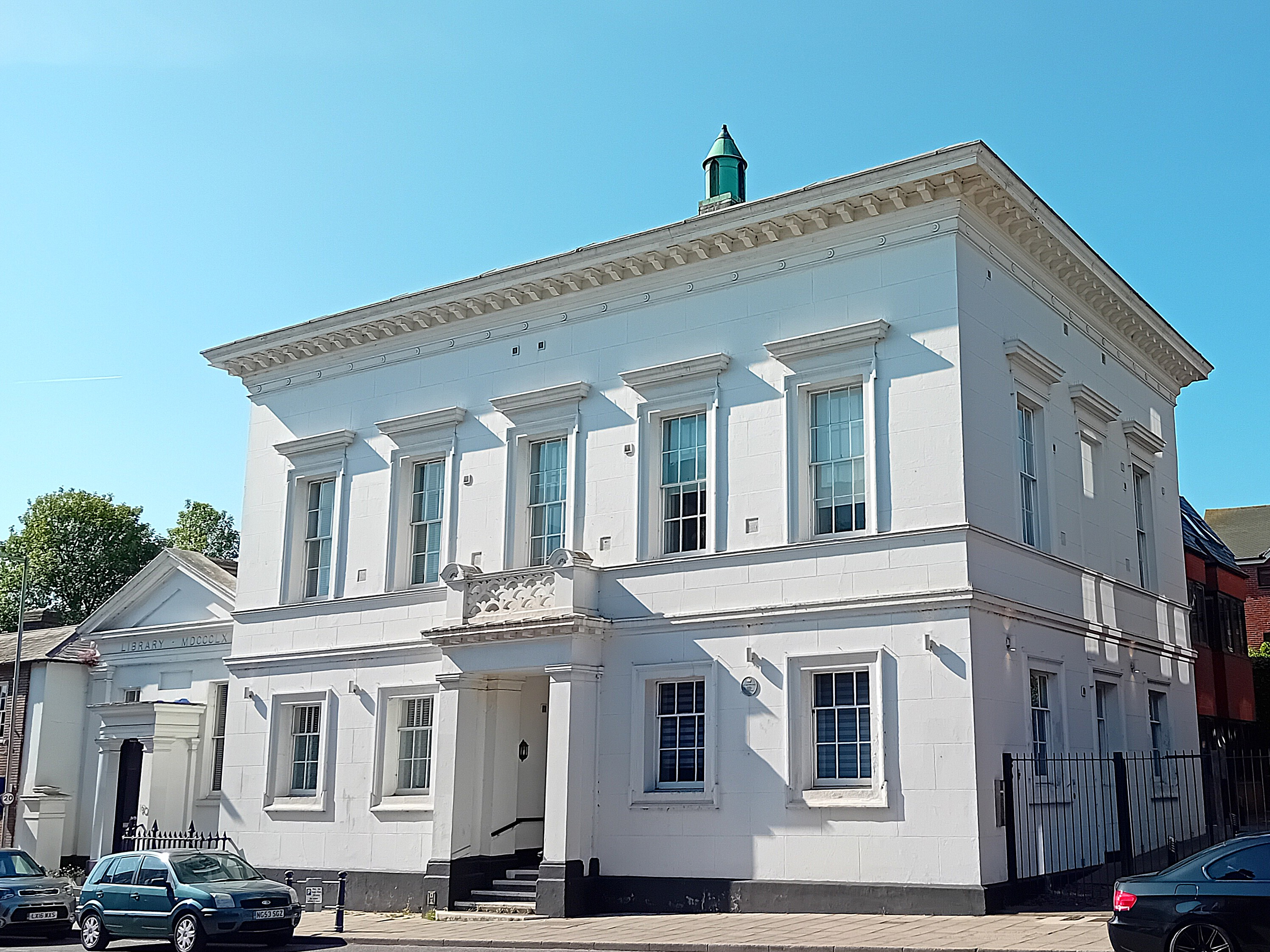
The first town hall in Hitchin, now converted into flats

The first town hall in Hitchin was a building designed by Thomas Bellamy in the Italianate style, which was erected on the south side of Pound Street, now known as Brand Street, in 1840. (Note: The old town hall continued to be used as council offices during the 20th century and, after the turn of the millennium, became a nightclub known as "The Ivory" before being converted into flats in 2016.)

After population growth in the 19th century, partly associated with the straw plaiting and lavender growing industries, Hitchin was made a local government district in 1873, governed by an elected local board. Such districts were reconstituted as urban districts under the Local Government Act 1894. In this context, the new civic leaders decided that the existing town hall was inadequate and that they would procure a new structure: the site chosen, on the opposite side of Brand Street, was occupied by William Jelly's tin plate workshop. The cost of the land acquisition was paid for by five wealthy dignitaries from the local area.

The new building was designed by Edward Mountford and Thomas Lucas in the Neo-Georgian style, built in red brick with stone dressings by Fosters at a cost of £7,300 and officially opened on 18 March 1901 by Lucy Hudson, wife of the local member of parliament, George Hudson. The design involved a symmetrical main frontage with seven bays facing onto the Brand Street; the central bay, which slightly projected forward, featured an arched doorway with a large keystone on the ground floor and mullioned windows on the first floor flanked by full-height pilasters supporting a modillioned pediment with the town's coat of arms in the tympanum. The pilasters were carved at the top with the letters "HUDC" (for Hitchin Urban District Council) and "AD MCM" (AD 1900). A cupola was erected at roof level. Internally, the principal rooms are the main assembly hall, now known as the Mountford Hall, and a reception room known as the Lucas Room.

The suffragette, Emmeline Pankhurst, visited the town hall and made a speech supporting women's suffrage in March 1907, while performers hosting concerts included the Jamaican reggae band Bob Marley and the Wailers in May 1973. The building continued to serve as the headquarters of Hitchin Urban District Council for much of the 20th century but ceased to be the local seat of government when the enlarged North Hertfordshire District Council was formed in Letchworth in 1974.

The town hall was closed in October 2012 to allow a major programme of works to be undertaken at a cost of £6 million: the works involved an extension to the southeast, with a glass and steel frontage, to create the North Hertfordshire Museum. The financing included £850,000 from Communitybuilders and £950,000 from the Heritage Lottery Fund, with the balance coming from council funds. The museum, which brought together collections from both the former Hitchin Museum and Art Gallery and the former Letchworth Museum & Art Gallery, opened in July 2019.
