= Mill race =

Channel for water driving a water wheel

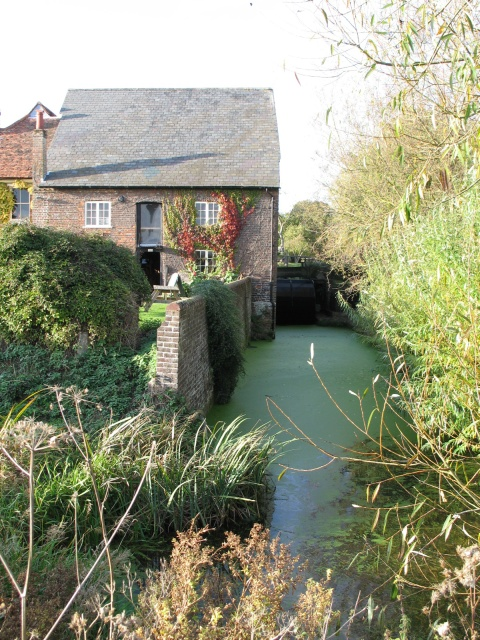
Mill Race, Redbournbury Mill, River Ver, near St Albans.

A mill race, millrace or millrun, mill lade (Scotland) or mill leat (Southwest England) is the current of water that turns a water wheel, or the channel (sluice) conducting water to or from a water wheel. Compared with the broad waters of a mill pond, the narrow current is swift and powerful. The race leading to the water wheel on a wide stream or mill pond is called the head race (or headrace), and the race leading away from the wheel is called the tail race (or tailrace).

A mill race has many geographically specific names, such as leat, lade, flume, goit, penstock. These words all have more precise definitions and meanings will differ elsewhere. The original undershot waterwheel, described by Vitruvius, was a 'run of the river wheel' placed so a fast flowing stream would press against and turn the bottom of a bucketed wheel. In the first meaning of the term, the millrace was the stream; in the sense of the word, there was no separate channel, so no race. The example of Mill Lade in Godmanchester refers to a wide channel leading to moorings where laden vessels unload, similar waterways known by the similar name of Lode exist in neighbouring districts.

As technology advanced, the stream was dammed by a weir. This increased the head of water. Behind the weir was the millpond, or lodge. The water was channelled to the waterwheel by a sluice or millrace- this was the head race. From the waterwheel, the water was channelled back to the course of the stream by a sluice known as the tail race. When the tail race from one mill led to another mill where it acted as the head race this was known as the mid race. The level of water in the millrace could be controlled by a series of sluice gates.

== Image gallery ==
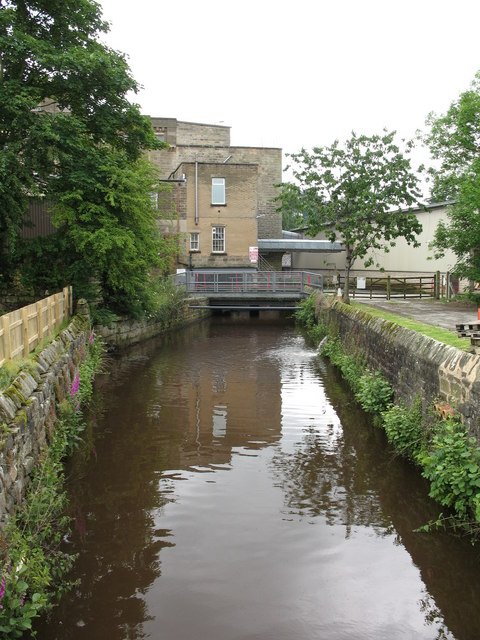
A head race

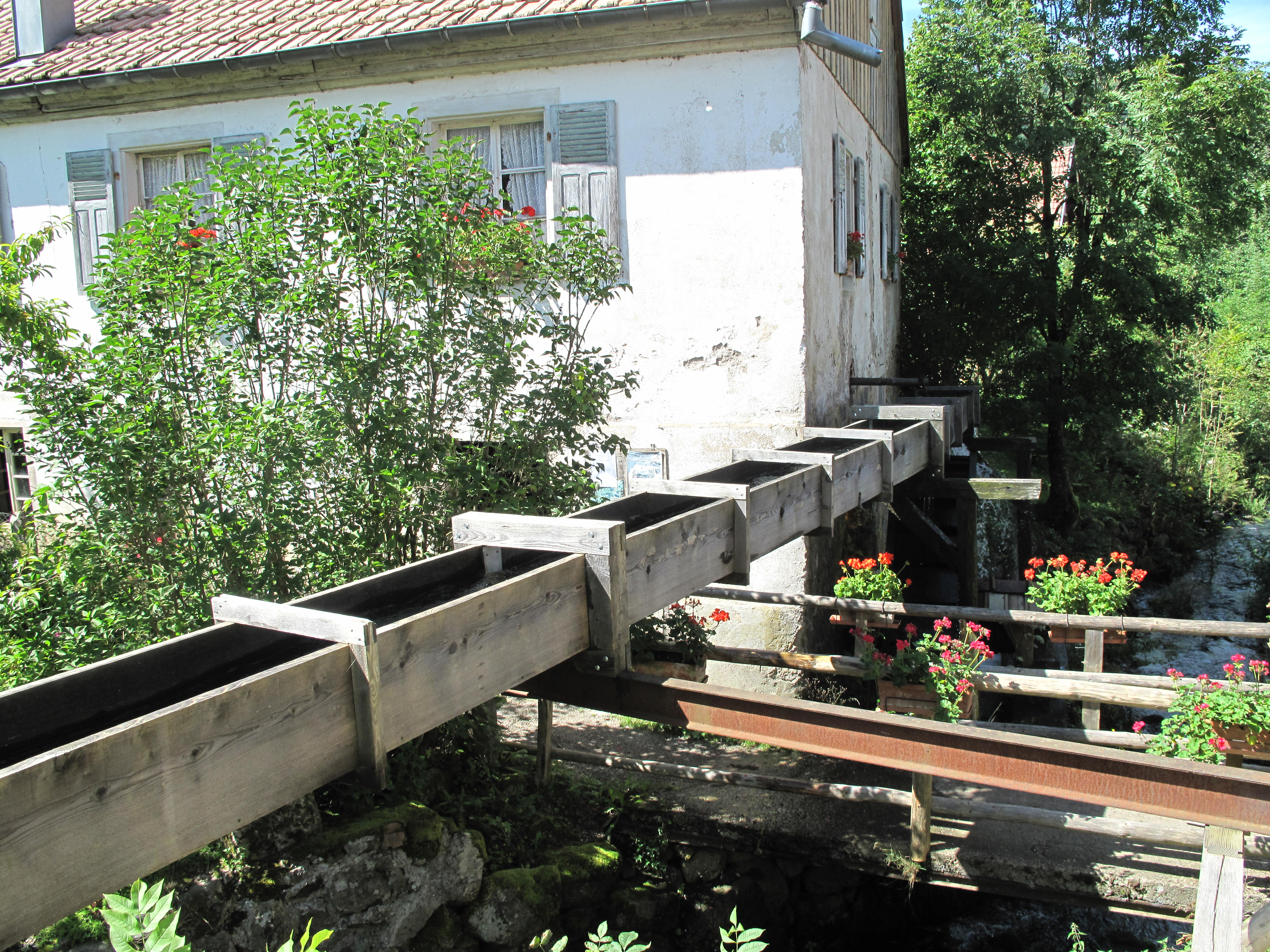
Storckensohn water head race, or flume.

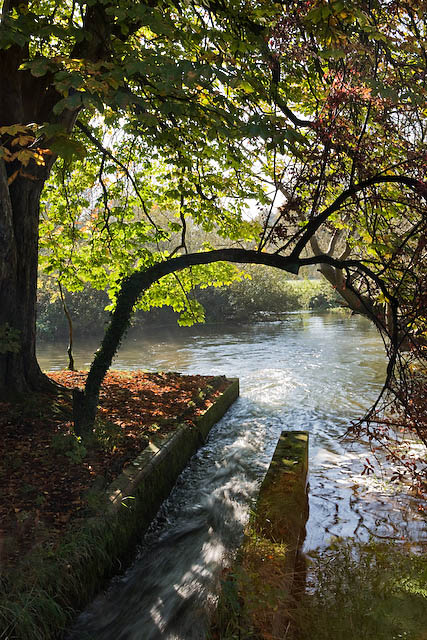
Tail race rejoining River Meon.

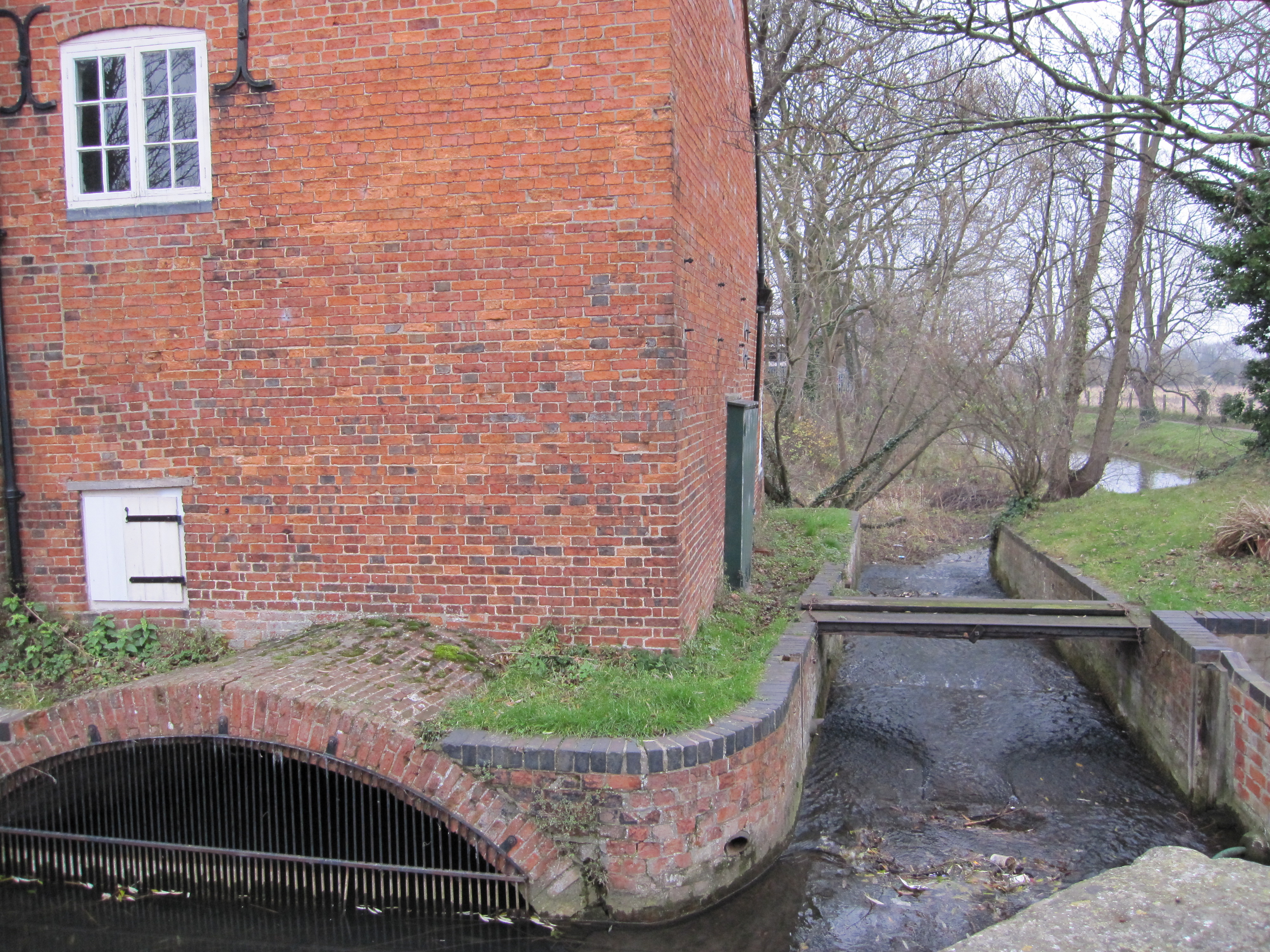
Cogglesford Mill: a covered head race and the by-pass weir

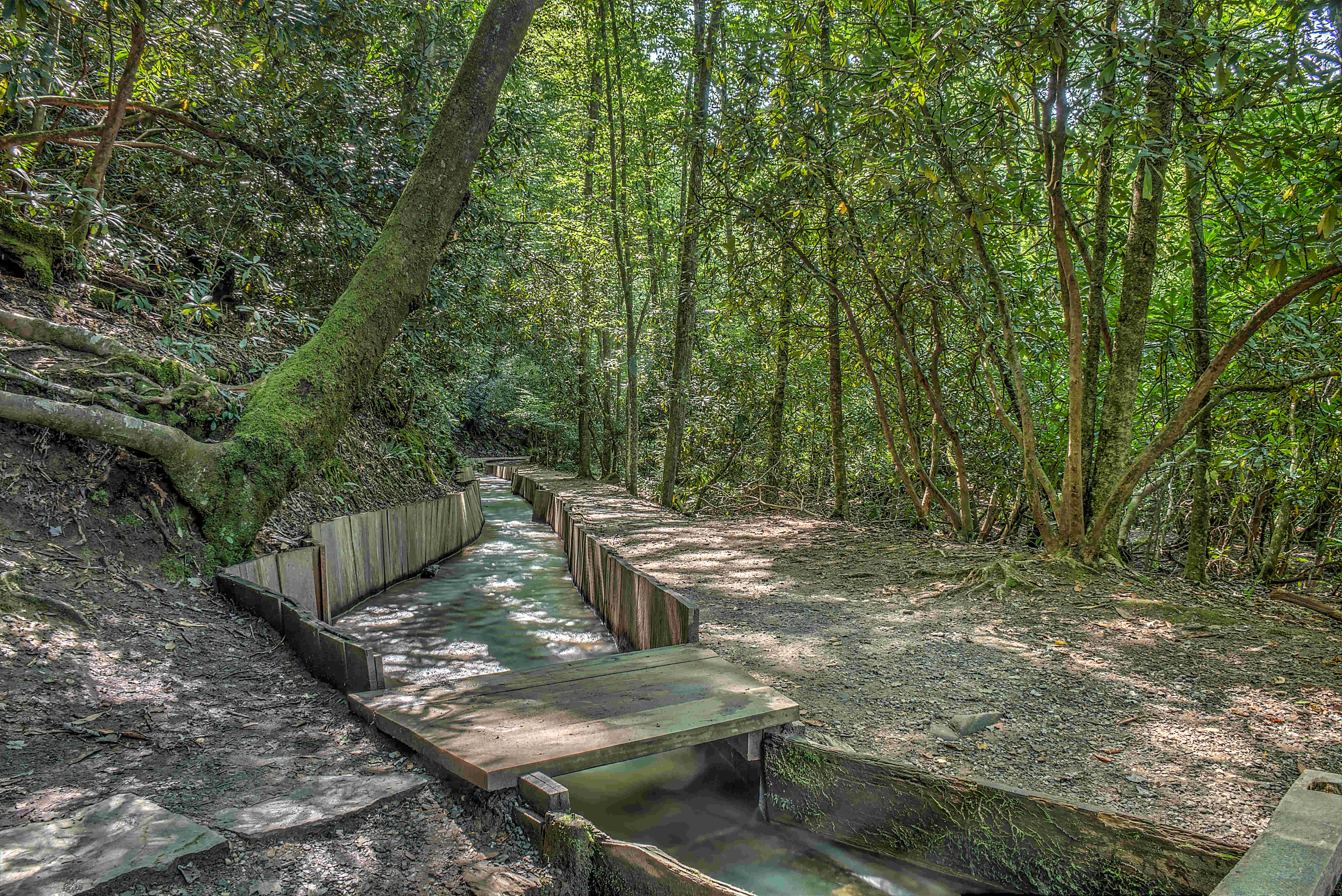
millrace for Mingus Mill

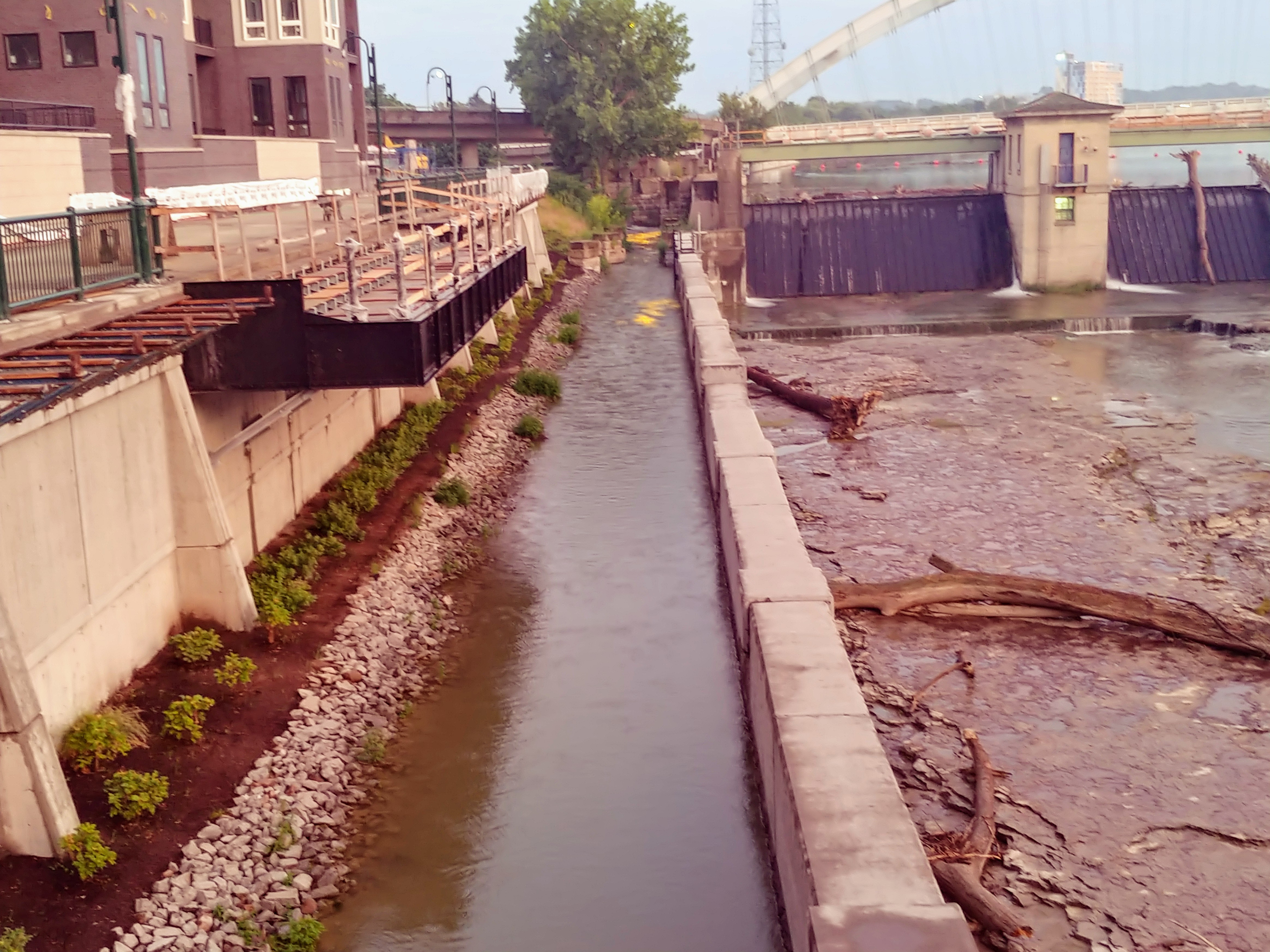
Johnson and Seymour Millrace from the Genesee River

== See also ==
- Canal pound
- Leat
- Penstock
- Watermill
- Water wheel
