= Redbournbury =

Hamlet in Hertfordshire, England

Coordinates: 51.78451°N 0.378°W

Redbournbury is a hamlet in the county of Hertfordshire. It is located near the A5 road in between the city of St Albans and the large village of Redbourn. It has a mill called Redbournbury Mill. It has a fishery called Redbournbury Fishery and Sporting Clays.
