= Contract city =

City that outsources municipal services

In some U.S. states, a contract city is a city that contracts for the provision of one or more municipal services with another unit of government or with a private or commercial organization.

== Lakewood ==
Lakewood, California was incorporated in 1954 as the first contract city. It was not the first city to enter into a contract with a county government to have services provided by the county. At that point in time, Los Angeles County already "had over 400 service agreements with 45 cities." What distinguishes Lakewood and other contract cities from traditional full-service cities is their reliance on "contracting as a way of life."

In Lakewood's case, it outsourced services so thoroughly back to the Los Angeles County government that early on, it only needed three employees: "an attorney, a city manager, and a secretary." This raises the obvious question of why it needed to incorporate in the first place. In the early 1950s, Lakewood was an unincorporated area facing a hostile annexation from adjacent Long Beach, California. American cities traditionally impose additional taxes on top of county taxes, but often provide higher levels of service and a wider range of services than county governments. However, unlike the vast majority of American counties, Los Angeles County had already developed a tradition of providing relatively high levels of service to unincorporated urban areas. Lakewood residents were satisfied with the status quo and were uninterested in paying even higher taxes to support both the Los Angeles County government and the Long Beach city government. Conversely, the county government had an interest in maintaining its traditional service-delivery role, as did its employees. Lakewood's use of municipal incorporation and extensive intergovernmental contracting to maintain local control became known as the Lakewood Plan and has served as a model for contract cities ever since.

In contrast, independent cities are cities which provide basic governmental services themselves, without contracting (this usage is not to be confused with the more common usage of independent city as a city that is not part of any county). Most older cities are independent cities. In practice, many cities today are hybrids of both. For instance, they may directly operate parks programs, but contract with the county for police and fire services. Most contract cities do their own land use planning, since they were usually incorporated to exert local control over land use.

== Notable contract cities ==
In the 21st century there has been a significant increase in the number of contract cities. Several that have received attention from the media include:

- Sandy Springs, Georgia
- Centennial, Colorado
- Maywood, California
- Dunwoody, Georgia

== International influence ==
British politician Nicholas Ridley regarded contract cities as a role model for local government in the United Kingdom. His ideas eventually led to the Conservative government's 1980s program of compulsory competitive tendering (later known under Labour governments as Best Value).

== See also ==
- Privatization
