= Fleur de Lys, St Albans =

Pub in St. Albans, Hertfordshire, England

Coordinates: 51°45′05″N 0°20′26″W

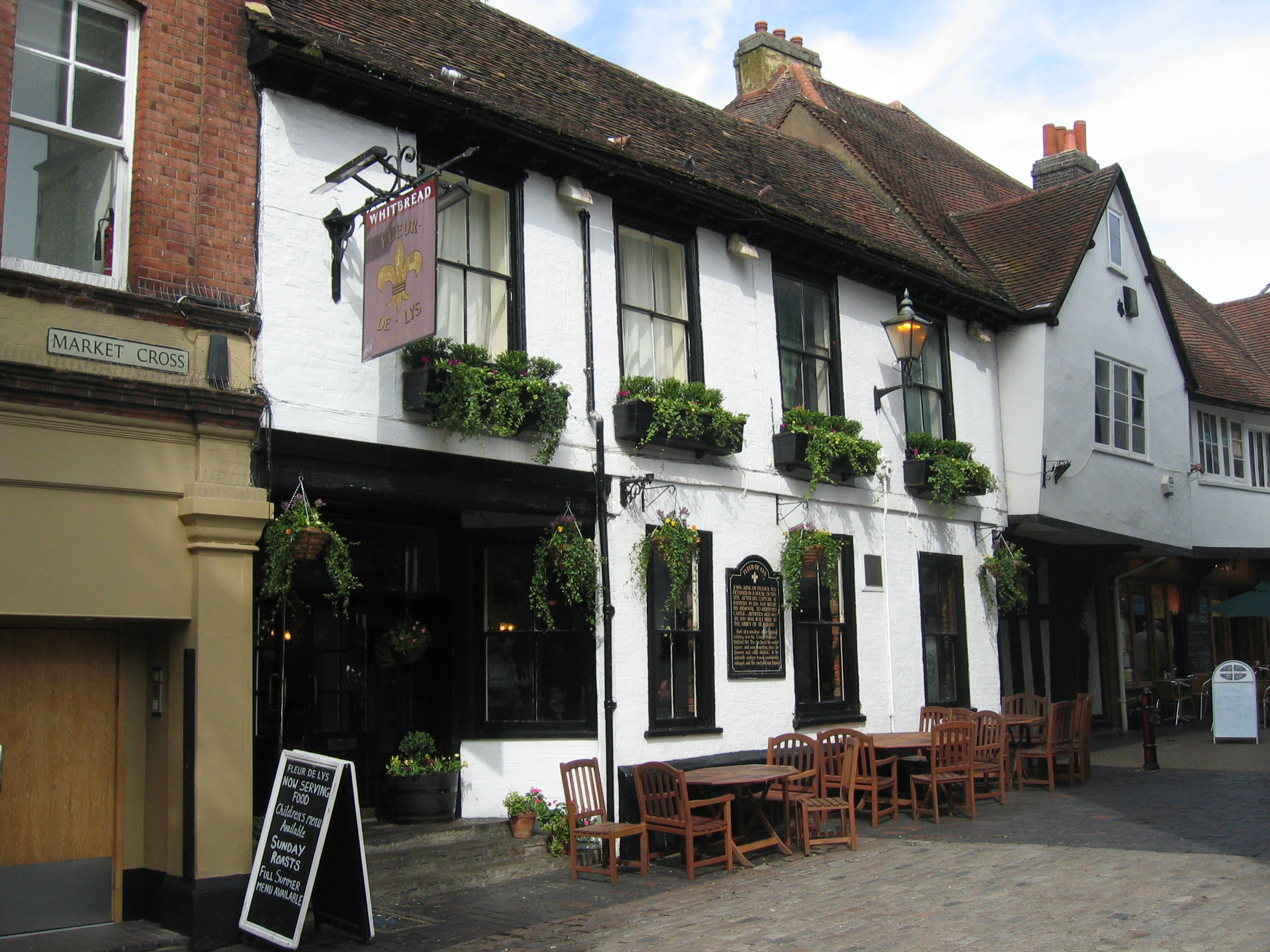
2004 photo showing a fleur de lys design on the pub sign

The Fleur de Lys (or Lis) was a public house in French Row, St Albans, Hertfordshire, England. The building has an C18th brick facade, but it dates from the Middle Ages and is listed grade II with Historic England. The building was refurbished and renamed The Snug in 2007, to become part of the Snug bar chain.
