= Best Value =

Best Value was government policy in the United Kingdom affecting the provision of public services in England. In Wales, Best Value is known as the Wales Programme for Improvement. A statutory duty of Best Value also applies in Scotland.

== Background ==
The predecessor to the UK Labour Government's Best Value policy was the Conservative Government's 1980s policy of compulsory competitive tendering (CCT). CCT originated in part with the ideas of Conservative politician Nicholas Ridley, who made "unfavorable" comparisons between the "fat and bloated" local authorities of the United Kingdom and the relatively "slim" contract cities of the United States. CCT required public-sector organisations to enable private companies to bid for contracts to deliver certain public services in competition with the public sector's own organisations. The idea was to improve services through competition. The Local Government, Planning and Land Act 1980 provided for a tendering requirement in relation to construction and building maintenance work contracts, and the Local Government Act 1988 provided for the following activities to be subject to CCT:

- refuse collection
- cleaning of buildings and "other cleaning"
- school and welfare catering
- "other catering"
- grounds maintenance
- vehicle repair and maintenance.

CCT was later extended to other activities such as housing management. The requirements were relaxed upon the election of the Labour government in 1997, but similar concepts were soon promoted by the Labour government through its 'Best Value' policy.

Best Value was adopted in England and Wales by the Local Government Act 1999, introduced by the UK Labour Government. Its provisions came into force in April 2000. The aim was to improve local services in terms of both cost and quality:

A Best Value authority must make arrangements to secure continuous improvement in the way in which its functions are exercised, having regard to a combination of economy, efficiency and effectiveness. (LGA 1999, section 3[1])

== Effects ==
The range of activities affected includes almost all local authority functions, including for example social services, environmental health, housing and planning.

The first details of Best Value were set out in the 'Twelve Principles of Best Value' announced in June 1997. The bill to provide the statutory framework was introduced in the 1998/9 parliamentary session.

In the period between announcement and introduction (May 1997 and April 2000) the government sponsored 37 voluntary council 'pilots', 22 of which contained a housing element. The purpose of the pilots was to "test elements of the best value framework, and assess the extent to which actual improvements in service quality and efficiency have flowed from the new approach". The rationale for the introduction of Best Value was summarised as follows:

Under Compulsory Competitive Tendering service quality has often been neglected and efficiency gains have been uneven and uncertain, and it has proved inflexible in practice. There have been significant costs for employees, often leading to high staff turnover and the demoralisation of those expected to provide quality services. Compulsion has also bred antagonism, so that neither local authorities nor private sector suppliers have been able to realise the benefits that flow from a healthy partnership. All too often the process of competition has become an end in itself, distracting attention from the services that are actually provided to local people. CCT will therefore be abolished.

Thus, the rationale for Best Value emphasised three points: the failure of compulsory competitive tendering; the importance of partnership in service provision; and the adverse effect of competition as a prime objective.

== History ==
Under the leadership of John Major the Conservative government pursued compulsory competitive tendering almost as a dogma, often against the wishes of local government. This led to an uncomfortable stand-off between the two, with CCT regulations being produced in increasing detail, and sometimes extending further than would have been the case in the private sector. The government was unambiguous about what was required – issue of tender, receipt of tender, selection of provider.

=== Introduction of best value ===
The term compulsory competitive tendering was superseded in 2000 by best value. Labour's Best Value proved more difficult to define. The notion of Best Value prior to implementation was enshrined within one key consultation document: Modernising Local Government — Improving local services through best value. This set out four defining elements of Best Value.

- The first was the duty to secure economic, efficient and effective services continuously (the '3 Es').
- The second required service reviews within which the authority must demonstrate that in the fulfilment of their duties under Best Value they have: compared their service provision with that of other private and public providers; consulted with local business and community; considered competition in provision; and challenged the reasons for, and methods of, provision (the '4 Cs').
- The third defining element introduced a regime of audit and measurement of performance, with the broad expectation that, year-on-year, costs would reduce and quality would increase. Performance would be monitored locally through Best Value Performance Reviews (BVPRs), partly through adherence to locally and statutorily determined Best Value performance indicators (BVPIs), and disseminated annually through Performance Plans (BVPPs).
- The fourth defining element of Best Value outlined the consequence of performance: government intervention in cases of Best Value failure, and reward in cases of success.

In turn these four aspects of Best Value are bound by adherence to twelve principles of Best Value mentioned above. The answer to the question of what method of service delivery, precisely, the government expected to arise from Best Value seemed to centre on local interpretation as satisfactory. The lack of clear definition, in the context of housing services, was explained as follows:

The paper does not attempt to define what best value in housing is — that is primarily a matter for individual local authorities in consultation with local people. The primary intention is to explain the process framework within which local housing authorities will need to operate in obtaining best value in housing (DETR 1999, s.1.3).

Therefore, while the message was unequivocally that compulsory competitive tendering was to be withdrawn, the replacement was to be less prescribed, with the intention that local authorities follow a responsive and locally determined method of service provision within a centrally defined framework. Best Value was not, therefore, about what local authorities should do: it was a framework that prescribed how they should decide what to do.

Specifically Best Value would differ from compulsory competitive tendering in three respects: organisation performance, organisation process, and the relationship between process and performance (Boyne 1999, p. 2).

=== Statutory guidance ===
A "short statutory guidance" document was issued in September 2011, dealing with certain "reasonable expectations of the way authorities should work with voluntary and community groups and small businesses when facing difficult funding decisions". Eric Pickles, in his foreword to the guidance, noted that councils had been "freed from excessive and prescriptive guidance" in exchange for a commitment to support voluntary groups and small businesses in their administrative areas.

Revised best value statutory guidance on working with voluntary and community groups and small businesses was issued in 2015.

== Measuring Best Value ==
For councils and authorities to be measured against Best Value, performance indicators, known as BVPIs (Best Value Performance Indicators) were introduced. These were a statutory set of 90 indicators developed by government departments to measure the performance of local authorities, that is, all local authorities must measure themselves against BVPIs. The data is collected and audited annually by the Audit Commission.

The 90 BVPIs covered many, but not all, aspects of services provided by local councils. These were withdrawn in 2008.

In order to provide a balanced view of performance, the BVPIs cover four dimensions:

- Strategic objectives — why the service exists and what it seeks to achieve
- Service delivery outcomes – how well the service is being operated in order to achieve the strategic objectives
- Quality – the quality of the services delivered, explicitly reflecting users' experience of services, and
- Fair access – ease and equality of access to services

Each year government departments work with each other to set indicators for the next year. BVPIs are set in line with the financial year (1 April to 31 March).

Many of the BVPIs have been in effect since the start of Best Value in April 2000, but some new indicators have been set, and some existing indicators were revised either to improve their definition or to be aligned with central government policy. Where a BVPI has a target attached to it, these targets are reviewed each year, in light of the most recent performance data provide by a local council.

As far as possible the government has tried to limit the number of changes. In fact, there were no amendments of additions to the BVPI set last year, and government has agreed to make no amendments to the present BVPIs until 2008/09.

== Consequences of failing Best Value ==
Where a council fails to meet a statutory target, the Secretary of State is at liberty to take action, particularly where an authority is not meeting its duty of continuous improvement. In practice, the Secretary of State can direct the council to take specific action to secure improvement, or, in extreme cases, remove the functions concerned from its control altogether.

== Scotland ==
The duty of Best Value in relation to Scotland applies to all public bodies. It is a statutory duty for Scottish local authorities and a formal duty for the Scottish Police Authority and its Chief Constable and the Scottish Fire and Rescue Authority and Chief Fire Officer. Elsewhere in the public sector it is a formal duty placed on Accountable Officers, such as the chief executives of NHS bodies and further education colleges.

== See also ==
- Privatisation

== Sources ==
- Boyne G (1999) in Boyne G (ed) Managing Local Services: From CCT to Best Value London: Frank Cass and Co. Ltd.
- Department of the Environment (1997) The Principles of Best Value London: DoE.
- Department of the Environment, Transport and the Regions (1997a) Criteria for project selection London: DETR
- Department of the Environment, Transport and the Regions (1998) Improving local services through best value: Consultation Paper London, DETR
- Department of the Environment, Transport and the Regions (1998a) Modernising local government: Improving local services through best value London: DETR
- Department of the Environment, Transport and the Regions (1999) Best Value in Housing Framework Consultation Paper London: DETR
- LGA 1999 Local Government Act 1999 available at: https://web.archive.org/web/20060228014729/http://www.opsi.gov.uk/acts/acts1999/19990027.htm
- "Revised best value statutory guidance". Ministry of Housing, Communities and Local Government. 27 March 2015.
