= Redbournbury Mill =

Watermill in Redbourn, Hertfordshire, England

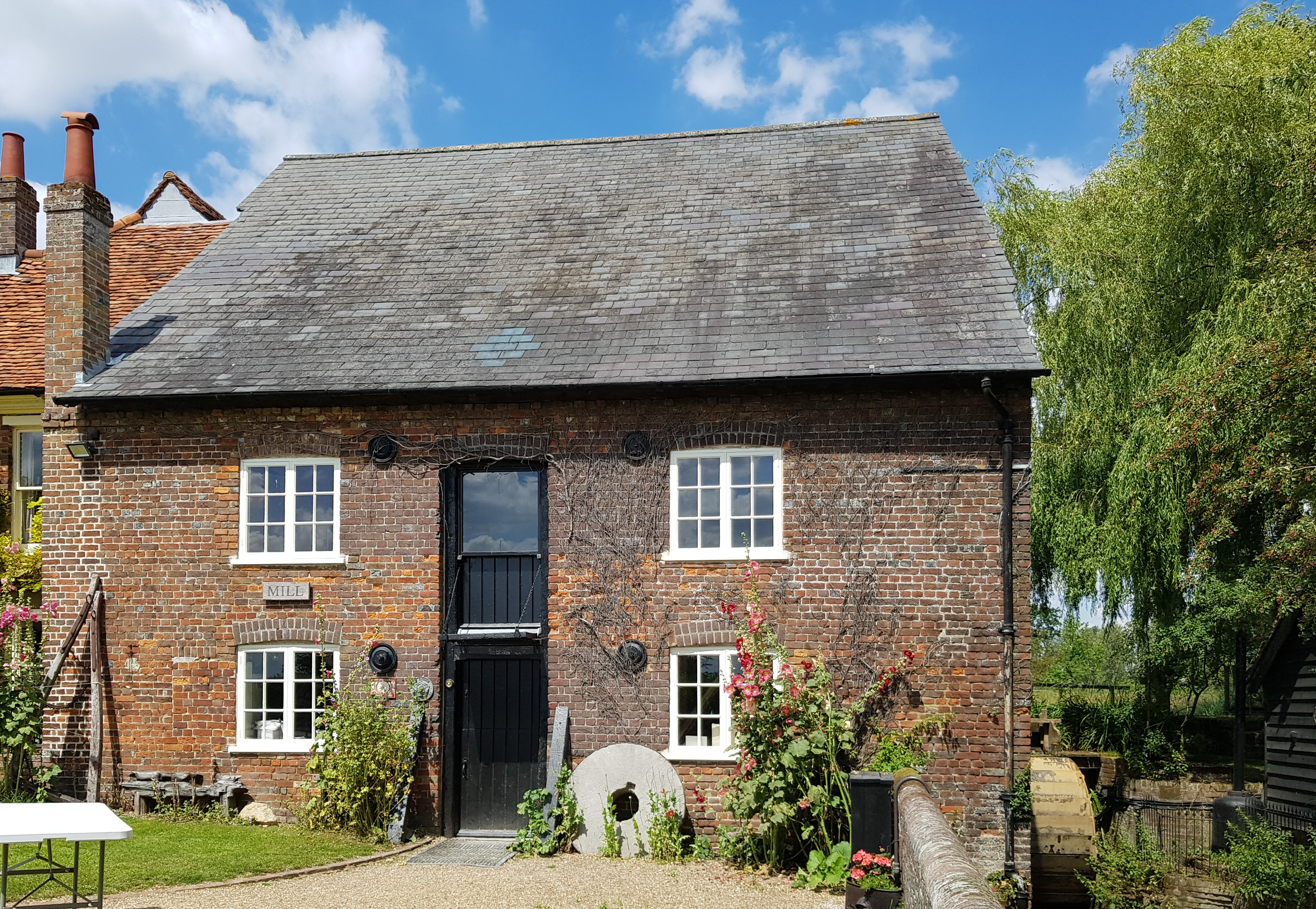

- Location within Hertfordshire
- 51°47′04″N 0°22′41″W
- Type: Watermill
- Location: Redbournbury Lane, Redbournbury
- OS grid reference: TL 11855 10775

History
- Built: 1780

Site notes
- Area: Hertfordshire
- Owner: Private

Listed Building – Grade II*
- Official name: Redbournbury Mill, including front railings
- Designated: 27 September 1984
- Reference no.: Historic England – National Heritage List for England (1175121)

Redbournbury Mill, is a Grade II* listed flour mill in Redbournbury, Hertfordshire, England, which is thought to have been first built in the early 11th Century. The mill has two sets of French burr stones that grind 100% certified organic wheat, rye and spelt grains in to a range of wholemeal and white flours.

Having operated as a watermill on the River Ver for approximately 1,000 years, the mill has suffered from reduced water flow since the 1950s due to high levels of abstraction from the local chalk aquifer by water companies. While the river turns the waterwheel, it no longer provides enough power to drive the millstones. Today the mill is driven by an electrical motor, though a restored 1932 Crossley HD11 diesel engine can also be used to power the machinery.

== History ==
The date of inception of Redbournbury Mill is unknown, however, a mill on the same site was mentioned in the Domesday Book of 1086, and it is possible that the existing mill was built on these foundations. Prior to that however, in c.1030 the Manor of Redbourn was given to the Abbot of St Albans by Aegelwyne le Swarte and his wife Wynfreda, wealthy Saxon landowners, and possible lords. It is likely that the mill which once stood at the approximate site of Redbournbury would have been within the Manor of Redbourn, and was thus passed on to the Abbey. The nearby farmhouse was used by the Abbot's Chamberlain, and was referred to as Chamberlain's Mill. The lane that passes the mill crosses the River Ver by a deep ford.

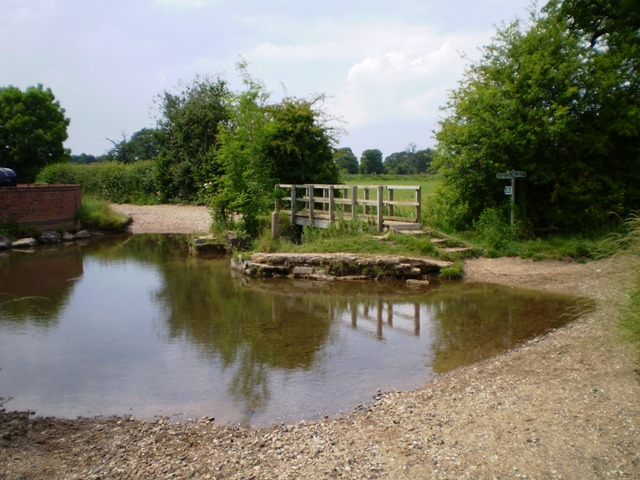
The ford by Redbournbury Mill.

Following the mention in the Domesday book, the next mention of a mill in the area was c.1290 (during the Abbacy of John de Berkhamstede), during which time Chamberlain's Mill burnt down. The fire threatened all of the Manor of Redbourn, but area was protected by the local woodland. There are an increasing amount of records regarding the mill from the mid Tudor period onward; following the dissolution of the monasteries by King Henry VIII, the lands of the Abbey of St Albans, of which the mill was a part, were seized by the King. Upon his death, these lands were bequeathed to his daughter Princess Elizabeth. Upon Elizabeth's passing, the land was passed on to her successor on the throne, James I.

James I would, via the Treasury, lease the mill (now called "Redbourne Greate Mill") to a series of private renters. Several decades after James' death, the mill was purchased in 1652 by Sir Harbottle Grimston a lawyer and politician for £200. Grimston had also purchased Old Gorhambury House and as a result the mill became part of the Gorhambury Estate. The Grimston family would go on to make an indelible mark in the surround area, due to the Earl of Verulam peerage bestowed upon them.

Little of record is known over the next 200 years or so, aside from a series of improvements and upgrades. Notable amongst these improvements was the installation of three 'in line' millstones. Typically millstones are laid around a central gearing mechanism as opposed to in a single straight line - as is the case here. The layout found in Redbournbury is the only known example in the county, and is rare in United Kingdom as a whole. The mill building now standing dates from c.1780.Two of the three sets are currently operational. These French burr stones grind only 100% certified organic wheat, rye and spelt grains.

In 1841, the tenant of the mill was one Edward Hawkins. This tenancy would be passed down through the Hawkins family for the next 144 years, aside from a 35-year gap beginning in 1855. Edward's great-granddaughter would be the last of the Hawkins family to mill at Redbournbury. Ivy began milling in 1916 at the age of 19, and would continue to live on site until 1985. Ivy's father Henry died in 1932, leaving the mill to his wife (Julia) and Ivy. Four years later, much of the Gorhambury Estate was sold by the 4th Earl of Verulam and as a result reverted to the Crown Estate; despite this change in ownership Ivy and Julia would continue the tenancy.

Following her mother's death in 1944, Ivy would go on to have an eventful career. In 1956 Ivy was trapped in the waterwheel for over an hour, having climbed inside to undertake repairs. Despite being trapped between an inner spoke and the outer wheel, whilst taking the weight of the water, Ivy was rescued, and, after a brief hospital stay returned home unscathed. Ivy would receive national attention three years later when The Times would run an article declaring her to be "Britain's only lady miller".

It is unknown when the River Ver alone was no longer enough to power the milling process, however, by the beginning of the early 20th Century the mill had been fitted with an engine (either steam or gas). There is little record of this however, as it was scrapped in 1915 during World War I. Whilst the River was no longer strong enough to operate the mill, the water wheel itself was still able to turn; this was how Ivy Hawkins is recorded to have powered her circular saw up until the 1970s.

== Revival and present day ==
Following Ivy Hawkins leaving the mill in 1985, the Crown Estate placed Redbournbury up for sale, and in 1987 sold it to its current owners, the James family. They were the only interested party who intended to restore the mill to full working order, it having been unused for milling since the 1950s. Subsequently, English Heritage offered the new owners a significant grant to help cover the costs of the renovation, and also reclassified the site to Grade II* listed status, meaning that both the mill and the house are historically protected buildings. On 22 August 1987, just days after renovations had started, a fire broke out in the roof of the mill. The fire quickly spread and gutted most of the mill's interior, as well as the upstairs of the house. The gearing of the mill itself was saved however, which ensured that the mill could be fully restored.

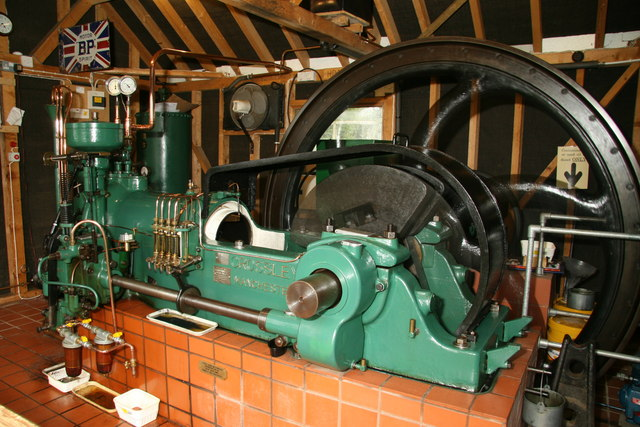
The Crossley diesel engine that now drives the milling equipment.

The ensuing restoration project took ten years to complete, and also saw the full repair and installation of a diesel engine which had not been used in approximately 30 years. The Crossley engine, which had been kept in an enthusiast's garden, had previously been used at a water pumping station in Aldershot before being made redundant. The diesel engine is a backup power source for the current electric motor. The modern day River Ver suffers from reduced flow caused by water company abstraction, and as such lacks the power to sufficiently drive the water wheel.

In 2005 a bakery was built in one of the disused barns at the front of the mill and was first opened to the public in July 2006. The bakery is open to the public on Saturday mornings and sells a range of breads and cakes all of which are made using flour ground within the mill. In addition, Redbournbury volunteers regularly man stalls at farmers markets in the surrounding area, including those at Harpenden, Kings Langley and St Albans. The bakery is currently overseen by baker Steven Mansbridge. The cereals used to produce the Redbournbury flour are grown locally at Hammonds End farm, Harpenden. This ensures that all Redbournbury products have very low food miles, as Hammonds End is less than 2 miles away from the mill.

=== Media appearances ===
Since 2013 Redbournbury Mill has appeared on a variety of television shows. Celebrity baker Paul Hollywood visited the mill in 2013 as part of his BBC Two series Paul Hollywood's Bread, whilst his Great British Bake Off co-host Mary Berry also visited the mill in 2016 as part of her "Easter Feast" programme to learn more about the Alban bun, an alleged forerunner to the Hot cross bun. Chef Jay Rayner had previously visited the mill in 2013 to learn more about the Alban bun for a segment on BBC One's The One Show.

== See also ==
List of Watermills in the United Kingdom

== Sources ==
- Reid, Kenneth (1987). Watermills of the London Countryside, their place in Englishlandscape & life. Vol. I. London: Charles Skilton. ISBN 0284-39165-4.
- Reid, Kenneth (1989). Watermills of the London Countryside, their place in Englishlandscape & life. Vol. II. London: Charles Skilton. ISBN 0284-98806-5.
