= Dance radio =

Radio format of dance and electronic music

Dance radio is a type of radio format that focuses on dance and electronic music. These formats typically feature current and recent hits in the genres, and may often include mixshows featuring songs mixed by DJs (including station personalities and special guests). Some stations—especially on digital platforms such as internet radio—may focus specifically on certain genres of electronic music, but many typically focus on genres under the umbrella of electronic dance music (including house and trance).

The format is popular in Europe and Asia. It is not as common in North America, where EDM-oriented stations are often a specialty format carried on digital radio or less-prominent outlets, although some attempts at a major-market dance music station have been done. Electronic dance music is typically played as a component of the wider rhythmic contemporary and rhythmic adult contemporary formats, and may appear on contemporary hit radio stations if they reach mainstream record charts.

== History ==
Most of dance radio's origins can be traced to the early days of disco in the late 1970s, when WKTU, , and WRKS 98.7 KISS-FM New York City, made the format a staple on the airwaves. By the end of the decade, the format began to experience a backlash when sentiments over the music began to force several stations to move on to other genres, with most of them moving to what would become urban contemporary, led by such stations as WAMO-FM Pittsburgh, WLUM-FM Milwaukee and WHRK Memphis. These stations kept the dance sound alive while at the same time mixed it in with the R&B, hip hop, and pop songs of the 1980s. At the same time, another former disco outlet, WXKS-FM Medford–Boston, became very successful in taking the urban-dance sound into a top 40 format.

By the mid-1980s, more stations began to adopt the same formula that has worked for WXKS-FM, such as KMEL in San Francisco, while at the same time more artists were incorporating dance styles into their hits. The concept would go a bit further in 1986, when KPWR Power 106 Los Angeles and its sister station WQHT HOT 103 New York (later becoming HOT 97 by 1988) debuted a "Top 40 Crossover" dance format, thus paving the way for more stations to jump onto this genre, such as WPOW Power 96 in Miami by 1988. This format would later become known as Rhythmic Contemporary Hit Radio, or Contemporary Hit Urban (CHUrban) by the 1990s.

In the US, the nation's first full-time dance radio format began airing in August 1991 when Los Angeles college radio station KSCR controversially changed its format from alternative rock to the "Pulse of the '90s" techno/rave format. KSCR continued airing this format until September 1993, when it switched back to alternative rock.

The USA's first commercial full-time dance radio format was MARS-FM, airing in Los Angeles and Orange County, California on 103.1 FM KSRF/KOCM from late 1991 to late 1992. The rave-inspired format was created by KROQ DJs Swedish Egil and Freddy Snakeskin. 103.1 FM would later be the home of several subsequent Los Angeles dance radio formats: "Groove Radio" (1996–1998), "Groove 103.1" (1998) and "KDL" (2003).

After the demise of MARS-FM, the former general manager of KSCR, who had been responsible for that station's change to a dance format, created a nighttime leased-time format from 1993 to 1994 at Santa Ana's KWIZ 96.7 FM called Renegade Radio, a dance music/techno format hosted by DJ Racer and former MARS-FM DJ Mike "Fright" Ivankay. Renegade Radio also broadcast MARS-FM music director Swedish Egil's syndicated Groove Radio program, which later became a full-time local dance/electronica format at 103.1 KACD/KBCD.

In 1996, with Groove Radio making its debut in Los Angeles, WKTU New York was revived. This would be followed by stations in other cities looking to duplicate its success.

Across the water in Northern Ireland, Energy 106.6 FM in Belfast played a comparable role during the late 1990s, contributing to the growth of the local dance music scene by broadcasting dance, house, and electronic music that received little exposure on mainstream radio. The station became closely associated with the development of club culture in the region, providing a platform for DJs and emerging styles.

In 2002, WPYM Miami would take the Dance format to a new level. The station's success would result in other newcomers adopting the "Pure Dance" format, but the lack of support from advertisers and issues from signal coverage to ratings would force several stations out the format. Despite the lack support from Top 40 and Rhythmic radio, the Dance format has continued to thrive at stations like KNHC Seattle and on satellite radio.

In 2008 Clear Channel dropped two HD dance channels, leaving Club Phusion and Pride Radio as the company's only dance offerings. In November 2008 the merged Sirius XM made cuts in music channels which included eight of the ten Dance stations on XM and Sirius, while WorldSpace satellite radio filed for bankruptcy protection, resulting in The System's discontinuation on XM. 2008 had the most dance music stations lost in recent years.

On October 31, 2008, KNRJ Phoenix went off the air, followed by the November 2008 channel merge of XM and Sirius which resulted in the elimination of Chrome, The Strobe, The Move, The System, Boombox, and the merging of The Beat with BPM and Sirius Chill with XM Chill. Sirius XM returned The Strobe to the channel lineup in January 2009 after a backlash from subscribers over the removal of both classic dance channels, which left no channel playing that music.

In 2009, Music Choice pared down its dance offerings by merging its Dance and Electronica channels, while Mega Media's plan to expand its Pulse 87 brand to Los Angeles, Chicago and Washington, D.C. failed to occur. Mega Media, which leased WNYZ-LP from station owner Island Broadcasting, filed for Chapter 11 bankruptcy protection in August 2009, citing $3.5 million in liabilities against assets of $180,000. Island ended its leasing deal with Mega for WNYZ on October 30, 2009, and WNYZ signed off the air the same day. The following Monday, Party 105.3 on Long Island added 87.7 as a simulcast. In September 2009, KNGY/San Francisco was flipped by new owner Royce International to Top 40/CHR, but the following month KMVQ filled the void by adding a HD2 subchannel called "Pulse Radio."

As of 2010, the WPTY simulcast on WNYZ, WMPH Wilmington, Delaware and iPartyRadio.com became casualties due to financial situations. However, KXRG-LP Honolulu, which signed off the air in 2007 after their frequency was taken over by KORL-FM, returned to the air at a new frequency, followed by the July 3, 2010 debut of WWAC Atlantic City with a Dance-intensive Rhythmic Top 40 format. In December 2010 KBPA Austin's HD2 channel "Mega HD2" returned to the airwaves on a low-powered translator, but after a few days returned to WBPA's HD2 subchannel.

In 2011, Clear Channel's iHeartRadio relaunched the Trance/Electronica HD2 subchannel Trancid, while WWAC, under new ownership, shifted to a regular Top 40/CHR direction. Even WPTY would exit the format, shifting to Rhythmic AC after seeing more potential in that format after doing a series of "throwback" weekends. On the other hand, KVBE Las Vegas replaced its Dance format with Rock but the Dance format went over to another rimshot outlet, KYLI. KRXV/KHWY/KHYZ Barstow/Mountain Pass, California, which also serves Las Vegas, dropped their Hot AC format to relaunch KVBE's former Dance format and adopts its former "Vibe" moniker the following September. Also that same month, WPGC-FM Washington, D.C., a station whose programming history included stints in the Disco and Dance genres, launched a HD2 subchannel billed as "Area 95.5." Meanwhile, in Winnipeg, Manitoba, CHWE-FM debuted with a Top 40/Dance presentation, billed as "Energy 106."

In 2012, KXJM Portland, Oregon would bring the Dance format to the local HD airwaves with the launch of "Too Wild," while in Halifax, Nova Scotia, CKHZ-FM, a Top 40 that was launched in 2006 with a Dance-leaning direction before shifting to a regular Top 40/CHR presentation in 2009, returned to its Dance roots and rebranded itself as "Energy 103.5," using the same direction as sister station CHWE. This was followed by WOLT Greenville, South Carolina adding Dance mixes to its brokered programming schedule, KDHT-FM Denver bringing the format back to that market and WARG Summit/Chicago joining KNHC in being the second current high school outlet in the United States to offer a Dance format but on a part-time basis. Another surprise move would also take place in late April 2012, when WPTY returned to playing Dance full-time after a brief stint as a Rhythmic AC. By November 2012 KDHT would drop the format for Adult Hits, but in December 2012, WHBA, who had been programming an Adult Hits format in Boston, went the other way around and made headlines by flipping to an EDM-focused presentation, billed as "Evolution 101.7," with the call sign WEDX.

As of 2013, the Dance format would see WOLT change format to Oldies and dropping brokered programming while it picked up another full-time outlet, this time in Gainesville, Florida, where on June 1, JVC Media, the owner of WPTY, expanded its "Party" brand to its newly acquired property WBXY, followed in November by non-commercial outlet KVIT Phoenix.

In January 2014, WPCF/W227CE Panama City Beach, Florida, which previously programmed a "Trop-Rock" format, flipped to Dance under the operation of Patrick Pfeffer, owner of Club La Vela, a dance club in Panama City Beach, followed by KXTE Las Vegas launching a HD2 subchannel called "SIN107.5." The same month saw Mediabase and All Access team up to launch a Top 50 Dance Airplay chart with 23 stations reporting. On June 13, 2014, WEDX flipped from Dance to Country but moved its format over to the HD2 subchannel of Top 40/CHR sister WXKS-FM.

By 2015, Miami would once again have a full-time Dance station when Zoo Communications took over the translators of WHYI and later WMIA (at 93.5), which later coincided with the launch of WZFL in 2016 and later expanded to West Palm Beach with the acquisition of WBGF in August 2017.

On May 3, 2019, at 5 pm, the Research Triangle region of North Carolina (Raleigh, Durham, Cary, Chapel Hill) welcomed NC State University's WolfBytes Radio onto 88.1 WKNC HD3. The station had been online-only up until that point.

== Stations in the United States ==
With the increasing electronic dance music scene in the United States, there are several terrestrial radio stations in the country that broadcast a dance-oriented format as their primary programming. Joel Salkowitz, program director of Pulse 87 and Las Vegas station KYLI, argued that the format is not as widespread in the country because popular EDM songs often cross over into the playlists of contemporary hit radio and rhythmic contemporary stations, presuming that major station owners would not want the listenership of their pop and rhythmic-oriented stations to be cannibalized by an EDM-specific outlet.

=== Full-time ===
- KHYZ Mountain Pass, California (Revolution 99.7)
- KNHC Seattle, Washington (Dance 89.5)
- WBGF West Palm Beach, Florida (simulcast of WZFL) (Revolution 93.5)
- WZFL/W228BY Islamorada, Florida/Miami, Florida (Revolution 93.5)
- WJZZ/W213AC Montgomery, New York/Poughkeepsie, New York (88.1 WJZZ)

=== Part-time ===
- KGAY-FM Palm Desert, California (KGAY 103.1)
- WCPY Chicago (Evenings, during Dance Factory FM)
- WGAY Sugarloaf Key (Party 105.7)
- WPTY Calverton-Roanoke, New York (Party 105.3)
- WPNA-FM Chicago (Sunday-Friday 9-midnight during Party Mix and Saturday 10-midnight during Clubbing)
- WUGM-LP Muskegon, Michigan (weekends)

=== Low-power FM ===
- KRYC-LP Yuba City, California
- KXRG-LP Honolulu, Hawaii
- WCGD-LP Edgar, Nebraska
- WCKP-LP Ocala, Florida

=== HD stations ===
- Fire Lane (KNX-HD3 Los Angeles)
- Revolution 93.5 (WMIA-HD2 Miami Beach)
- Party 93.1-HD2 (WFEZ-HD2 Miami)
- WolfBytes Radio (WKNC-HD3 Raleigh)
- Pulse Radio (KMVQ-HD2 San Francisco
- Energy 100.5 HD2 (KZZO-HD2 Sacramento)
- The Party ATX (KGSR-HD3 Cedar Park)
- Vibez 103 (KFTZ-HD3 Idaho Falls, Idaho)
- 93.5 Planet Vibe (WVYB-HD2 Daytona Beach, Florida)

=== Audio and cable ===
- DMX
  - DMX Dance
  - DMX Electronica
- Music Choice
  - Dance/EDM
  - Party Hits

=== Satellite radio ===
- Sirius XM Radio
  - BPM (Dance currents)
  - Diplo's Revolution (Global/underground Dance, House, Deep tracks, festivals, mix shows)
  - Studio 54 Radio (Disco, Freestyle, 70's, 80's, and Nu Disco)
  - Chill (Deep house, downtempo, indie/alternative dance, electronica)
  - Radio Monaco (Eurodance and European pop)
  - Utopia (90's, Y2K, and 2010's Dance)

=== U.S.-based Internet radio ===
- Cardio Dance Radio Louisville, Kentucky
- Digitally Imported New York City
- Energy 98 Portland, Oregon
- Groove Radio Los Angeles, California
- iHeartRadio:
  - Dance Nation 90s
  - Dance Top 20
  - Evolution
  - Mix Nation
  - Pride Radio (HD)
  - The Spin*Cycle
  - Trancid
- Audacy:
  - Channel Q (HD)
- Insomniac Radio Los Angeles, California
- Miami Mike Radio Fort Lauderdale, Florida
- Nexus Radio Chicago, Illinois
- Pulse 87 New York City
- PulseEDM Dance Music Radio San Antonio, Texas
- Radio Danz Miami, Florida
- A Reason To Dance - Radio G! Los Angeles, California
- RHYTHM 86 San Francisco, California
- ShoutDRIVE Los Angeles, California
- WolfBytes Radio Raleigh, Durham, Cary, Chapel Hill, North Carolina

== Stations in Australia ==
- Massive Dance Radio
- Kiss FM Australia
- Raw FM
- Q Dance
- Energy FM
- Gorilla Radio
- Fresh 92.7
- NovaNation
- Dance Hits

== Stations in New Zealand ==
- George FM

== Stations in Canada ==
- CHWE-FM Winnipeg (technically CHR, but feature Dance/EDM currents)
- CIDC-FM Orangeville Toronto (Dance Hits Format)
- CKBE-FM Montreal (technically Rhythmic adult contemporary, but features Dance/EDM currents)
- CJLL-FM Ottawa (simulcasts internet station DJ.FM everyday from 12-6 AM local time)

== Stations in Mexico ==
- XHSON-FM Mexico City (Beat 100.9)

== Stations in Europe ==
- Dance Radio UK, United Kingdom
- Frisk Radio, UK
- BBC Radio 1 Dance, UK (available via BBC Sounds online and DAB+)
- Capital Dance, UK (available online and DAB+)
- Danceradio, Netherlands (Amsterdam) DAB+ radio, various radio apps, www.danceradio.nl
- TOPradio, Belgium's Flemish Region
- SLAM!FM Netherlands (some of the frequencies can be heard in portions of Belgium and Germany)
- 89 and 102.9 DanceRadio, Prague, Czech Republic
- Reef FM Tenerife, Canary Islands (also available as DAB)
- Blast 106, Belfast Northern Ireland (fusion of pop)
- Energy 106, Belfast Northern Ireland
- DFM, Moscow, Russia
- Radio Record, Saint Petersburg, Russia
- Radio M2O, Italy
- Radio CFM, Constanța, Romania
- Unika FM, Madrid, Spain
- Fun Radio, France and surrounding countries
- Kiss FM, Ukraine
- Dance FM, Romanian cities of Bucharest, Cluj-Napoca, and Târgu Mureș
- Ibiza Global Radio Ibiza, Mallorca, Italy, and Croatia
- Radio FG, France and Belgium
- Future Generation 93.8, Istanbul, Turkey
- Sunshine Live, Germany

== Internet radio outside the U.S. ==
- América Dance 90
- Argentine Tango Radio
- Dance UK
- Danceradio.ca
- Danceradio.cz
- Danceradio.dl
- DJFM Toronto
- Energy 106 Belfast
- Energy FM
- Hot Dance Radio
- Mazoozie
- Massive Dance Radio
- Music Okey
- One World Radio
- FM-101 The Planet
- Radio Dance 90
- RadioMonster Dance
- Radio Record.ru
- Real Dance Radio
- RTÉ Pulse
- Seejay.cz
- Top Radio

== Defunct ==
HD Radio

- WWMX-"MIX2" Baltimore, Maryland
- WMKK Boston, Massachusetts (Funkytown 93.7-HD2)
- HD-Power DASH2 (WPOW Miami)
- Mega 103.5-HD2 (KBPA Austin, Texas) - Also on *K288FJ 105.5FM Bastrop, Texas
- Evolution 101.7 (WBWL-FM HD2 Boston, Massachusetts)
- Energy 95.7(KKHH-FM HD2 Houston, Texas)
- WRDW-HD2 Philadelphia, Pennsylvania (Hot Wired)
- SIN107.5 (KXTE-HD2 Las Vegas, Nevada)
- B96 Dance (WBBM-FM HD2 Chicago, Illinois)
- Energy (WCFS-FM HD2 Chicago, Illinois)
- Evolution 99.1 (KUBT-HD2 Honolulu, Hawaii)
- KSFM (KSFM-HD2 Sacramento, California)
- KDLD-FM (KDLD-HD2 Santa Monica, California)
- Chill with Alice (KLLC-HD2 San Francisco)
- KDKA-FM (KDKA-FM HD2 Pittsburgh, Pennsylvania)
- Eclectic Chill Out (KYKY-HD2 St. Louis) (Electronica/Chill Out)
- House of Sophie (KEGY-HD3 San Diego) (House/Electronica)
- Too Wild (KXJM-HD2 Portland, Oregon)
- Party Zone (KDWB-FM HD2 Minneapolis, Minnesota)
- Evolution 93.3 (WFLZ-FM HD2 & WFLZ-FM HD3 Tampa, Florida)
- Area 95.5 (WPGC-FM HD2 Washington, D.C.)
- Glow (KBZT-HD3 San Diego, California)
- Sin 100.5 (KXQQ-HD2 Henderson)
- Rave 99.9 HD2 (KMGG-LP-HD2 Albuquerque, New Mexico)
- LasVegas.Net Radio (KHYZ-HD2 Mountain Pass)
- Drive FX (WGNY-HD2 Rosendale)
- Club Phusion

Satellite

- Boombox
- Chrome
- The Move
- The Beat
- Electric Area
- The System
- Tiësto's Club Life Radio

Internet

- WFSH - Fresh 106 New York
- Music ONE
- Party Radio USA

Terrestrial

- CING-FM (Energy 108) Ontario Canada (switched to a hybrid Top 40/CHR/Dance format in 1998 and was shut down and replaced with a country format in 2002, brought back the energy name in 2018 but no longer plays dance (only during occasional events/raves) and has played CHR/Top 40 since 2012)
- KRXV/KHWY/KHYZ Barstow, California; Laughlin, Nevada; Mountain Pass, California (Highway Vibe-still under this name but no longer plays Dance)
- WEDX Boston, Massachusetts (Evolution 101.7)
- WKIE/WKIF/WDEK Arlington Heights, Illinois; Kankakee, Illinois; DeKalb, Illinois (Energy 92.7/5)
- KKDL Dallas, Texas (106.7 KDL)
- KXDC Denver, Colorado (102-1X)
- KDHT-FM Denver, Colorado (Hot 107.1)
- KVBE Las Vegas, Nevada (Vibe 94.5)
- KYLI Las Vegas, Nevada (Jelli 96.7)
- KYLI Las Vegas, Nevada (Pulse 96.7)
- KDLD/KDLE Santa Monica, California; Newport Beach, California (103.1 KDL)
- WPYM Miami (Party 93.1)
- Beat Radio Minneapolis 97.7, Beat Radio Network (national)
- KNRJ Phoenix, Arizona (Energy 92.7 & 101.1)
- WKOE Atlantic City, New Jersey (Hot 106.3)
- KLNA Sacramento, California (Power 105.5)
- KPTI San Francisco, California (Party 92.7)
- KNGY San Francisco, California (Energy 92.7)
- KREV Alameda, California (Pirate Radio 92.7)
- KREV Alameda, California (Revolution 92.7)
- WMPH Wilmington, Delaware (Super 91.7-still under this name but no longer has Dance programming)
- KENU Enumclaw, Washington (Pulse 1330)
- WNRG-LP Palm Bay, Florida (Energy 107.9)
- WXJZ Gainesville, Florida (Party 100.9)
- WBXY LaCrosse, Florida (Party 99.5)
- WBZC Burlington, New Jersey(Z88.9)
- WWAC Ocean City, New Jersey (Wild 102.7)
- WSTK Aurora, North Carolina (Surge 104.5)
- WEGG & W263BE Rose Hill, North Carolina (Surge Radio 100.5 & 710)
- WPTY Calverton-Roanoke, New York (Party 105.3-still under this name but has shifted more towards a Rhythmic Hot AC direction with some dance tracks and remixes)
- WRMA Miami, Florida (DJ106.7)
- KLBU Santa Fe, New Mexico (Electronica/Chill)
- KPMW Maui, Hawaii
- KVIT Apache Junction, Arizona (Pulse Radio)
- KXMG Austin, Texas (Mega 93.3)
- WGWE Little Valley, New York (Energy Radio Buffalo)
- CKHZ-FM Halifax, Nova Scotia (Z103.5)
- XHCHL-FM Monterrey, Nuevo León (Beat 90.1)
- DZUR Manila (107.9 U Radio)
- WPCF & W226CJ Panama City, Florida (93.1 Play FM)
- WZDJ Jacksonville, Florida (DJ 105.3)
- KAAU Salt Lake City, Utah (105.1 FM)
- WOLT Indianapolis, Indiana (103.3 Spin FM)
- WSHE Miami, Florida (Evolution 103.5)

Part-time

- CHOQ-FM Toronto, Ontario (Energy 105.1) (nightly from 10pm-6am)
- KCPR San Luis Obispo, California (evenings during Club 91)
- WOLT Greer, South Carolina (103-3 SPIN FM) (branding during certain hours)
- KCXL/K275BQ/K284CH Liberty, Missouri/Kansas City, Missouri (Surge Radio - aired Sunday 5-6pm)
- XHPUE-FM Puebla (evenings during Kick FM 104.3)
- WKEY-FM Key West (93.7 NRG)
- KQPS Palm Springs, California (Affiliate for Audacy's "Channel Q" HD platform)
- KGAY Thousand Palms, California (KGAY 106.5)
- KGAY-FM & K293CL (KGAY 106.5 & 92.1)

Low-power FM

- W228BY Miami (Revolution 93.5)
- WUOH-LP Orlando, Florida (U100.7)
- W244AS Oakhurst, New Jersey
- K244FE Minneapolis, Minnesota (Pride Radio Minneapolis)
- K248CU Austin, Texas (Pride Radio Austin)
- K256AS Honolulu, Hawaii (Evolution 99.1)
- W228BV Fort Lauderdale, Florida (Revolution 93.5)

Low-power TV audio (also heard on FM)

- Pulse 87 New York (Broadcast on channel 6 WNYZ-LP; audio on 87.75 MHz)
- Party 87 New York (Broadcast on channel 6 WNYZ-LP; audio on 87.75 MHz)
- Area 87.7 Las Vegas (Broadcast on channel 6 KGHD-LD; audio on 87.75 MHz)
- Acid 87.7 Las Vegas (Broadcast on channel 6 KGHD-LD; audio on 87.75 MHz)
- Club 87.7 Las Vegas (Broadcast on channel 6 KGHD-LD; audio on 87.75 MHz)

== Music charts ==
- Frisk Radio Hot 30! Realtime dance music chart from the UK
- UK Dance Chart broadcast Sundays at 23:00 UK time
- Number-one dance hits
- Billboard's Hot Dance Airplay chart
- All Access Dance Chart, powered by Mediabase
- BDS Monitored radio panel

== Dance Music Internet Radio Directories ==
- myRadioTuner the Exclusive EDM, Dance And Electronic Internet Radio App
