= KGAY =

KGAY may refer to:

- KGAY-FM, a radio station (92.1 FM) licensed to serve Thermal, California, United States
- KFSQ, a radio station (1270 AM) licensed to serve Thousand Palms, California, United States, which held the call sign KGAY from 2018 to 2025
- KTMT (AM), a radio station (580 AM) licensed to serve Ashland, Oregon, United States, which held the call sign KGAY from 2008 to 2010
