= Calverton National Cemetery =

Veterans cemetery in Suffolk County, New York

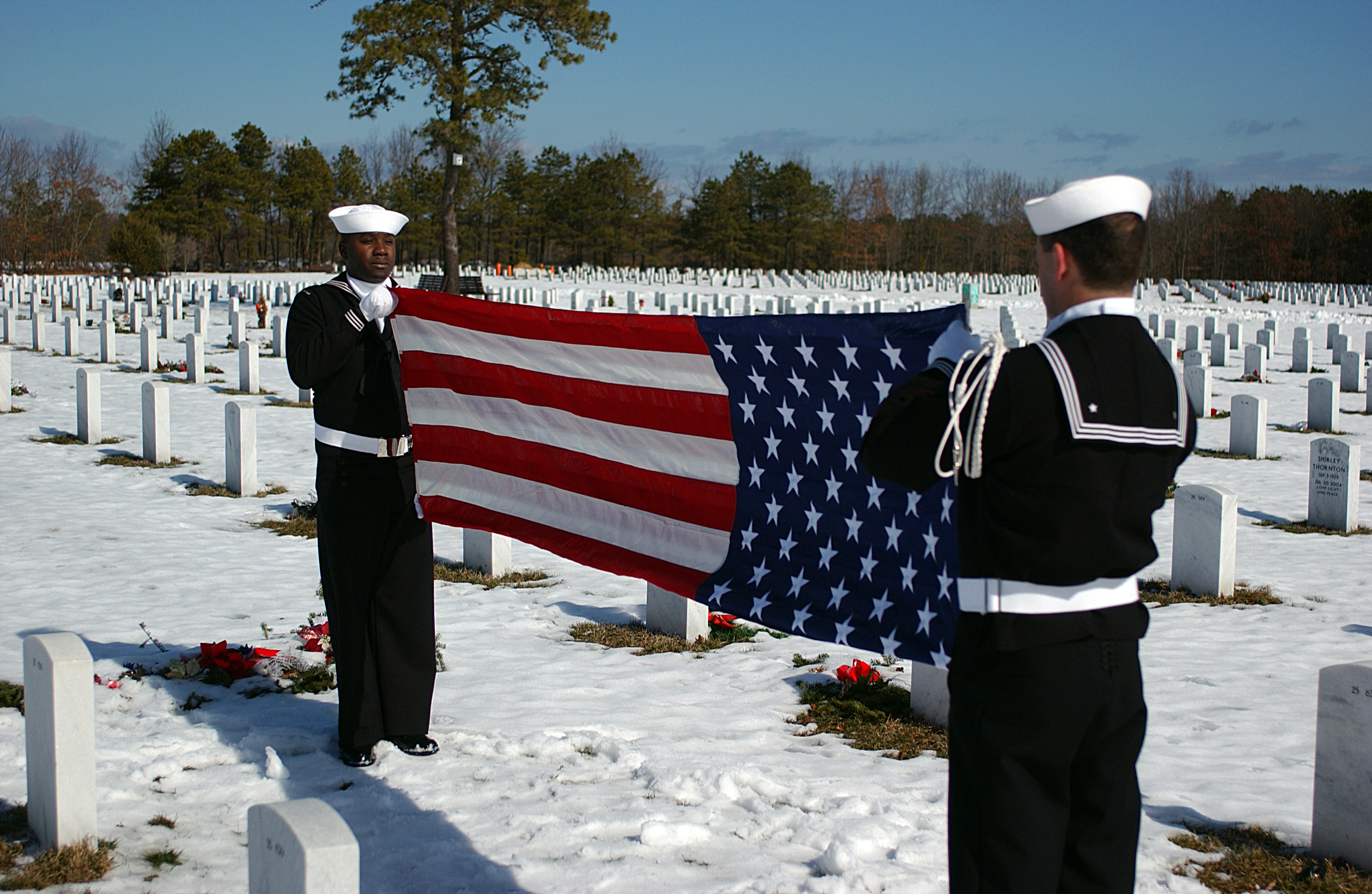
- Interactive map of Calverton National Cemetery

Details
- Established: 1978
- Location: Calverton, New York
- Country: United States
- Coordinates: 40°55′55″N 72°48′55″W
- Type: Public
- Owned by: United States Department of Veterans Affairs
- Size: 1,045 acres (423 ha)
- No. of graves: 275,000
- Website: VA Official Site
- Find a Grave: Calverton National Cemetery
- The Political Graveyard: Calverton National Cemetery

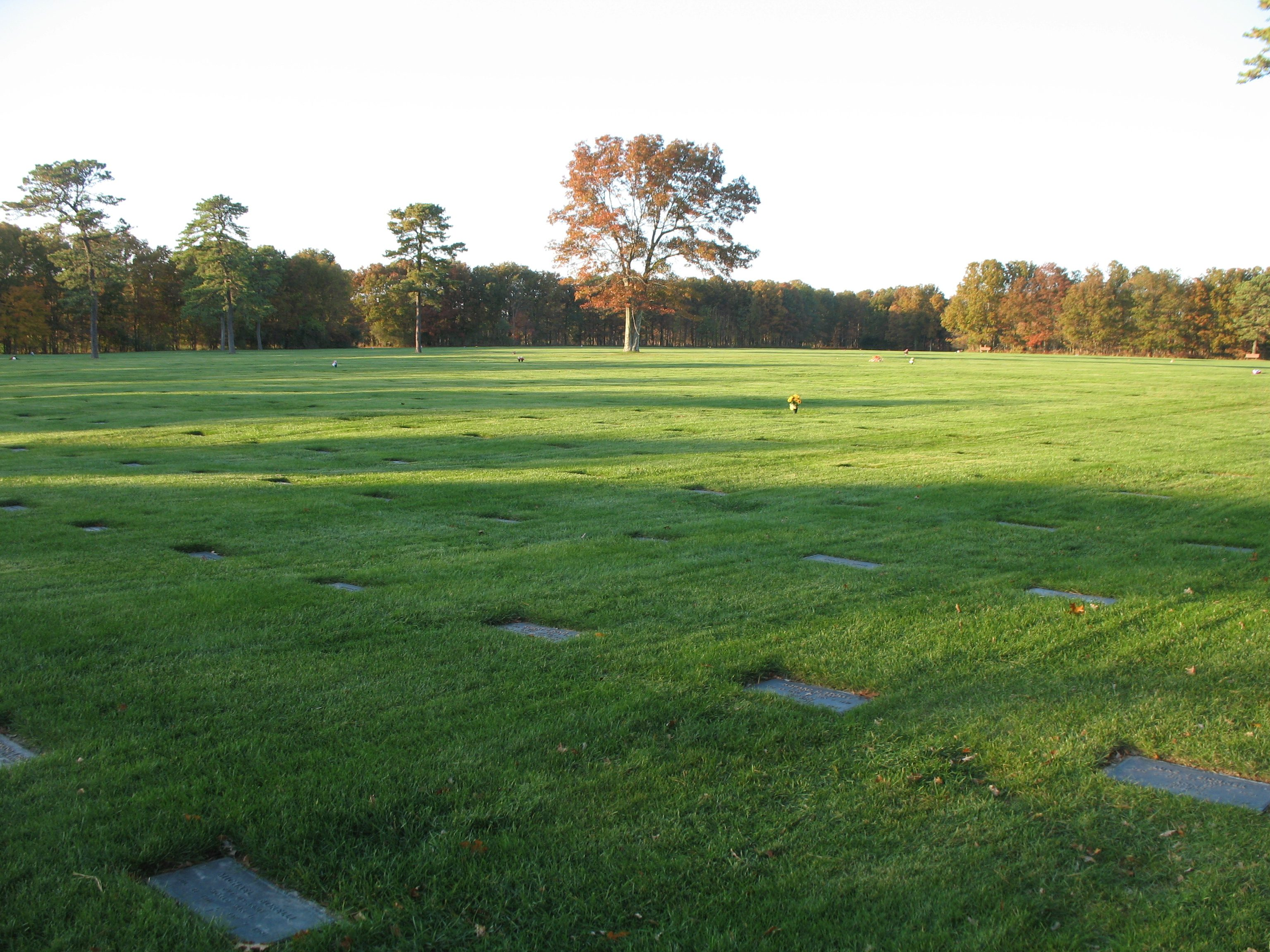
Some of the fields in the cemetery have flat grave markers.

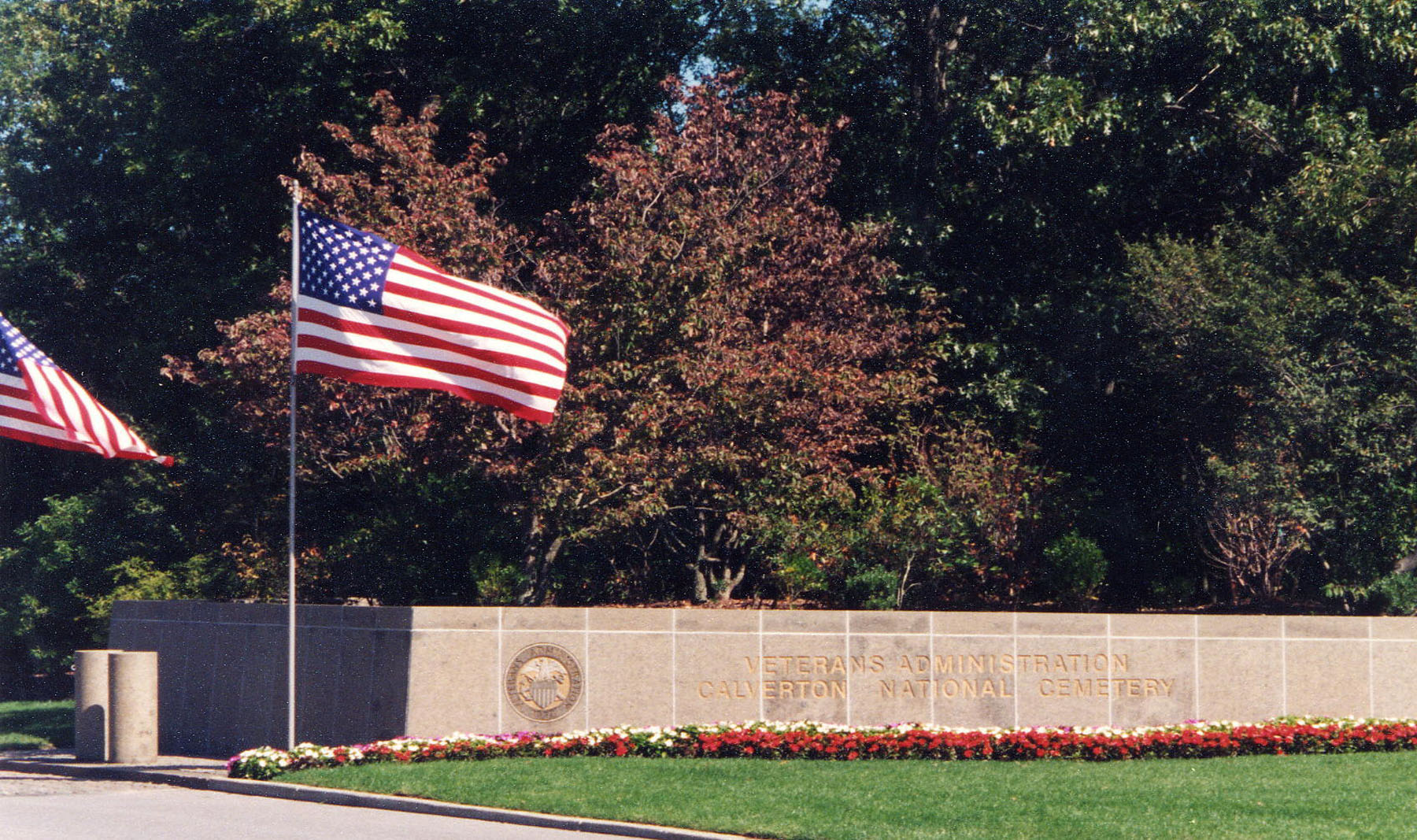
Sign at the entrance of the cemetery

Calverton National Cemetery is a United States National Cemetery in the Town of Riverhead in Suffolk County on eastern Long Island in New York. The cemetery's street address is in Calverton but the property is in the adjacent hamlet of Wading River. It encompasses 1,045 acres (423 ha) and as of the end of 2008 had 212,000 interments.

It has the largest area of any national cemetery in the United States, and the busiest (in terms of daily burials) conducting more than 7,000 burials each year as of 2011.

== History ==
When the National Cemetery System constructed Calverton National Cemetery in 1978, the cemetery became the third national cemetery to be located on Long Island. The other national cemeteries situated on Long Island are Cypress Hills National Cemetery, in Brooklyn, New York, which was established in 1862 and Long Island National Cemetery, in Farmingdale, New York, established in 1936.

In 1974, Long Island National Cemetery was the only national cemetery on Long Island with available space for burials—but its maximum burial capacity was soon to be exhausted. As a result, plans were developed by the National Cemetery System to construct a new regional cemetery to serve the greater New York area, home then to nearly three million veterans and their dependents. On December 7, 1977, a 902 acres (365 ha) tract of land was transferred from the Naval Weapons Industrial Reserve Plant, Calverton to the Veterans Administration for use as a national cemetery.

The National Cemetery System realized that Calverton National Cemetery would become one of its more active cemeteries. For that reason, they designed and built a feature called a committal "wheel" of shelters that permits multiple burial services to be held simultaneously. To the left of the main cemetery entrance, around the Veteran's Circle, are seven committal shelters. After the funeral service, the caskets are moved into the hub of the wheel and then transported to their respective gravesites. In 1983, the walls of the committal shelters were reconstructed to serve as columbaria for the inurnment of cremated remains.

== Notable monuments ==
Calverton National Cemetery features a memorial pathway lined with a variety of memorials that honor America's veterans. As of 2003, there were 18 memorials here, most commemorating soldiers of 20th century wars.

== Notable interments ==
- Medal of Honor recipient
  - Michael P. Murphy, Lieutenant, US Navy SEAL. Afghanistan. Awarded the Medal of Honor for his actions in Operation Red Wings.
  - Garfield M. Langhorn, Private First Class, US Army. Vietnam. Awarded Medal of Honor for his actions protecting fellow soldiers from a grenade blast.
- Others
  - Edward Walter Egan, Sergeant, US Marines. NYPD detective and actor. Role model for Jimmy "Popeye" Doyle in the 1971 film The French Connection
  - Dorothy Frooks, Communications Yeoman, US Navy/ Technician 5, US Army. Served in World War I and World War II. Actress and author.
  - Francis S. Gabreski, Colonel, US Air Force. The top American fighter ace in Europe during World War II, a jet fighter ace in Korea.
  - Cassius C.A. Harris, U.S. Army Air Force/U.S. Air Force officer and combat fighter pilot with the Tuskegee Airmen
  - Leonard Jackson, World War II US Navy veteran. Actor who appeared on both Sesame Street and Shining Time Station.
  - Albert Paulsen, Private, World War II US Army. Actor.
  - Arthur Pinajian, Corporal, US Army, World War II. Awarded Bronze Star Medal. Comic book creator and illustrator in the 1930s to 1950s, and impressionist artist.
  - Isaac Woodard, Jr., Sergeant, US Army, World War II. African American World War II veteran whose 1946 beating and maiming sparked national outrage.
  - Hubert Julian, Trinidad-born aviation pioneer. He was nicknamed "The Black Eagle".
  - John Andrew Thorburn, Staff Sergeant, US Army and Air Force, Vietnam, Purple Heart Recipient. Father of rapper R.A. The Rugged Man. In the song Uncommon Valor, R.A. tells the story of his father

== See also ==
- United States Department of Veterans Affairs
