= KMEE =

KMEE may refer to:

- KMEE (FM), a radio station (92.1 FM) licensed to Thermal, California, United States
- KMEE-TV, a television station (channel 19, virtual 6) licensed to Kingman, Arizona, United States
- K32PG-D, a television station (channel 32, virtual 40) licensed to Phoenix, Arizona, which held the call sign KMEE-LD from 2025 to 2026
- KGAY-FM, a radio station (103.1 FM) licensed to Palm Desert, California, which held the call sign KMEE from 2023 to 2025
