= Metro Fuel Oil =

United Metro Energy Energy Corp
- Company type: Private
- Industry: Oil and gasoline
- Founded: 1942
- Headquarters: Greenpoint, Brooklyn, New York, United States
- Website: http://www.unitedmetroenergy.com

United Metro Energy Corp. is a privately held energy company, founded in 1942 and based in New York. The company supplies biodiesel, heating oil, ultra-low-sulfur diesel, natural gas and gasoline from its terminals in Greenpoint, Brooklyn and Calverton, Long Island.

== History ==
United Metro Energy was founded in 1942 by Pauline Pullo to sell home heating oil as a cleaner, more efficient alternative to coal. United Metro Energy remained a small retail operation until in the late 1970s Paul J. and Gene V. Pullo, Pauline's grandsons, took over the company.

In 1986, the company acquired their Greenpoint terminal, which put them into the wholesale business. Today, the company also has a delivery and fleet-fueling business as well as a natural gas business. United Metro Energy provides any heating fuel except propane, which is restricted in New York City.

In 2012, the company filed for Chapter 11 bankruptcy protection, blaming climate changes during the winter season.

== Biofuels ==
In 2004, when a federal mandate required gasoline to be produced with 10% ethanol, United Metro Energy adapted its blending operation to include ethanol. They then started to market biodiesel in the New York Metropolitan Area.

In early 2006, United Metro Energy received a BQ-9000 certification from the National Biodiesel Board. BQ-9000 assures that biodiesel is being produced to acceptable quality standards. Shortly after receiving this certification, in late 2006, United Metro Energy built a biodiesel processing facility adjacent to its terminal.

United Metro Energy ran a pilot plant at the Rutgers University Eco Center in 2008, where they tested potential feedstocks for quality, efficiency and emissions reductions.

=== Products ===
United Metro Energy markets two biodiesel-based products: Greenheat, a custom blended bioheat, and Biomax a biodiesel-blended motor fuel.

All of the trucks in United Metro Energy's Apollo fleet run on B20 Biomax for eight months, and B5/B10 Biomax for four months in the winter. This saves 750,000 pounds in carbon reduction for the year.

=== Legislation ===
On July 26, 2010, New York City Mayor Michael Bloomberg, City Council Speaker Christine Quinn and other environmental leaders in the political and oil industries came to United Metro Energy's biodiesel plant to hold a press conference announcing an agreement on Local Law 43, a legislation that was unanimously passed by the New York City Council and signed by the mayor on August 16, 2010, which requires that a minimum of 2% biodiesel is blended into all grades of heating oil beginning in October 2012. Local Law 43 also requires that the sulfur content in #4 heating oil be reduced from 3,000 parts per million to 1,500 parts per million, also beginning in October 2012.

=== Long Island development ===
United Metro Energy's biodiesel, petroleum storage and blending facility is located at Enterprise Park in Calverton, Long Island. The facility is in conjunction with the Calverton Rail Access Rehabilitation Project. United Metro Energy's site is located at the former fuel testing facility in the Grumman Naval Weapons Station at the industrial park, and uses their existing fuel tanks. This facility will allow United Metro Energy to transport its fuel via rail spur, reducing truck transport from their Brooklyn terminal. The groundbreaking of the rail spur took place on May 7, 2010.
