= Calverton Executive Airpark =

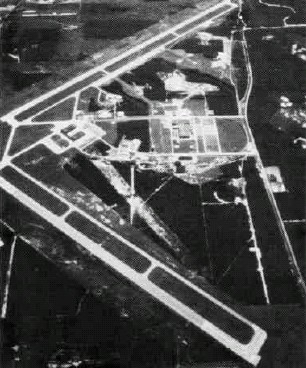
- Calverton in 1979-80
- IATA: CTO; ICAO: none; FAA LID: 3C8

Summary
- Airport type: Public-owned, private-use
- Owner: Town of Riverhead
- Location: Calverton, New York
- Elevation AMSL: 75 ft (23 m)
- Coordinates: 40°54′54″N 072°47′31″W

Map
- Interactive map of Calverton Executive Airpark

Runways
Direction	Length		Surface
Direction	ft	m	Surface
14/32	10,000	3,048	Asphalt/concrete
5/23 (closed)	7,000	2,133	Asphalt/concrete
- Source: Federal Aviation Administration

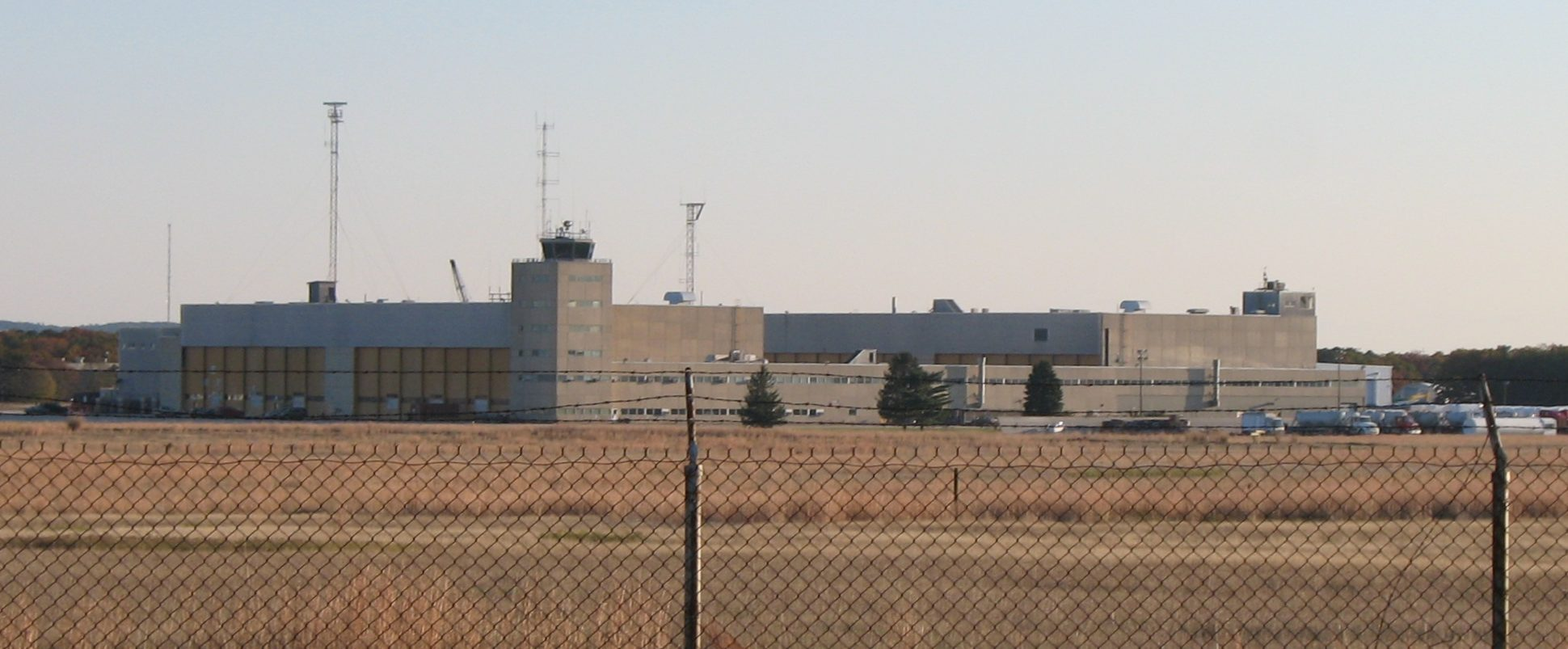
Main building

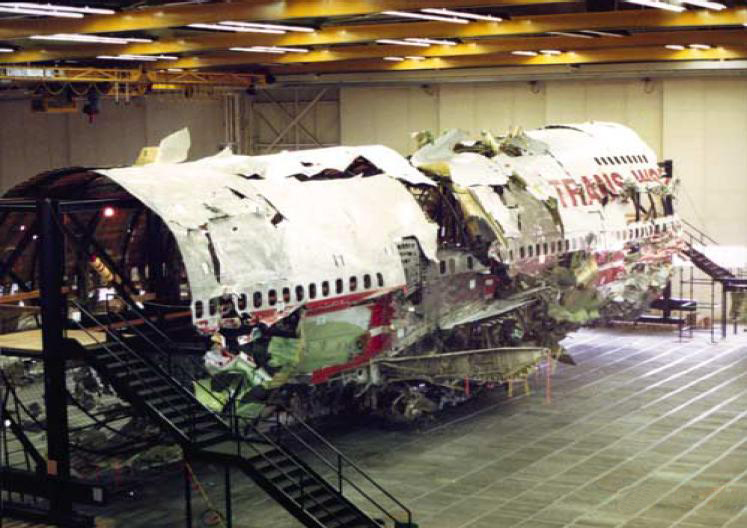
TWA Flight 800 reassembled in the building

Calverton Executive Airpark (IATA: CTO, FAA LID: 3C8, formerly CTO) also known as Peconic River Airport and Enterprise Park at Calverton (EPCAL) was a public-owned private-use airport located three miles (5 km) west of the central business district of the Calverton hamlet, in the Town of Riverhead, Suffolk County, New York, United States. It is owned by the Town of Riverhead.

It was formerly the Naval Weapons Industrial Reserve Plant, Calverton which was owned by the United States Navy and used to assemble, test, refit and retrofit jets built by the Grumman Corporation on Long Island.

The airport covers an area of 2,921 acres (1,182 ha) which contains two asphalt and concrete runways: 14/32 measuring 10,000 by 200 feet (3,048 m × 61 m) and 5/23 measuring 7,000 by 200 feet (2,134 m × 61 m).

The airport was lightly used for air traffic in lieu of the nearby Francis S. Gabreski Airport. Its last remaining air client, Skydive Long Island, closed permanently in 2015.

In 2021, The Town Board of Riverhead approved the airport to be the venue of Division 1 National Hot Rod Association (NHRA) drag racing events. The airport held inaugural NHRA drag racing events in summer 2021.

== History ==
In 1996, the wreckage of TWA Flight 800, which had exploded and crashed about 20 miles (32 km) south of the airport, was reconstructed in a hangar and was stored by the NTSB to be used as an accident investigation teaching aid. By the end of 2021, the wreckage and investigative techniques were considered technically obsolete. Per agreement of the victims' families when it was first commissioned as a training aid, the wreckage was dismantled. All salvaged parts of the wrecked Boeing 747-131 were recycled or scrapped in landfills.

In September 1998, the bulk of the developed land, 2,640 acres (1,070 ha), at the airport was donated to Riverhead. Another 2,935 acres (1,188 ha) was donated to the New York Department of Environmental Conservation for wildlife management.

In the 1998 transactions, East End Aircraft Long Island Corporation was given 10 acres (40,000 m^{2}) on Highway 25 which it is developing into the Grumman Memorial Park and Aerospace Museum.

As of January 2006, the Navy still owns 358 acres (mostly areas requiring environment cleanup) at the site. In January 2013, one of the Calverton airport's two runways was being used to store thousands of flood-damaged vehicles from Hurricane Sandy.

== Development efforts ==
Development for the central portion of the complex is still undecided as of March 2018. Various proposals have included building a 35-story artificial ski mountain, a racing track, a plant to build solar-powered planes, building a solar farm and building a large shopping center.

In January 2008, the Riverhead Town Board approved the sale of the airport for $155 million to Riverhead Resorts which planned a 35-story ski mountain in a proposed $2.2 billion project. In 2010 Riverhead cancelled the contract after Resorts did not make a $3.9 million payment.

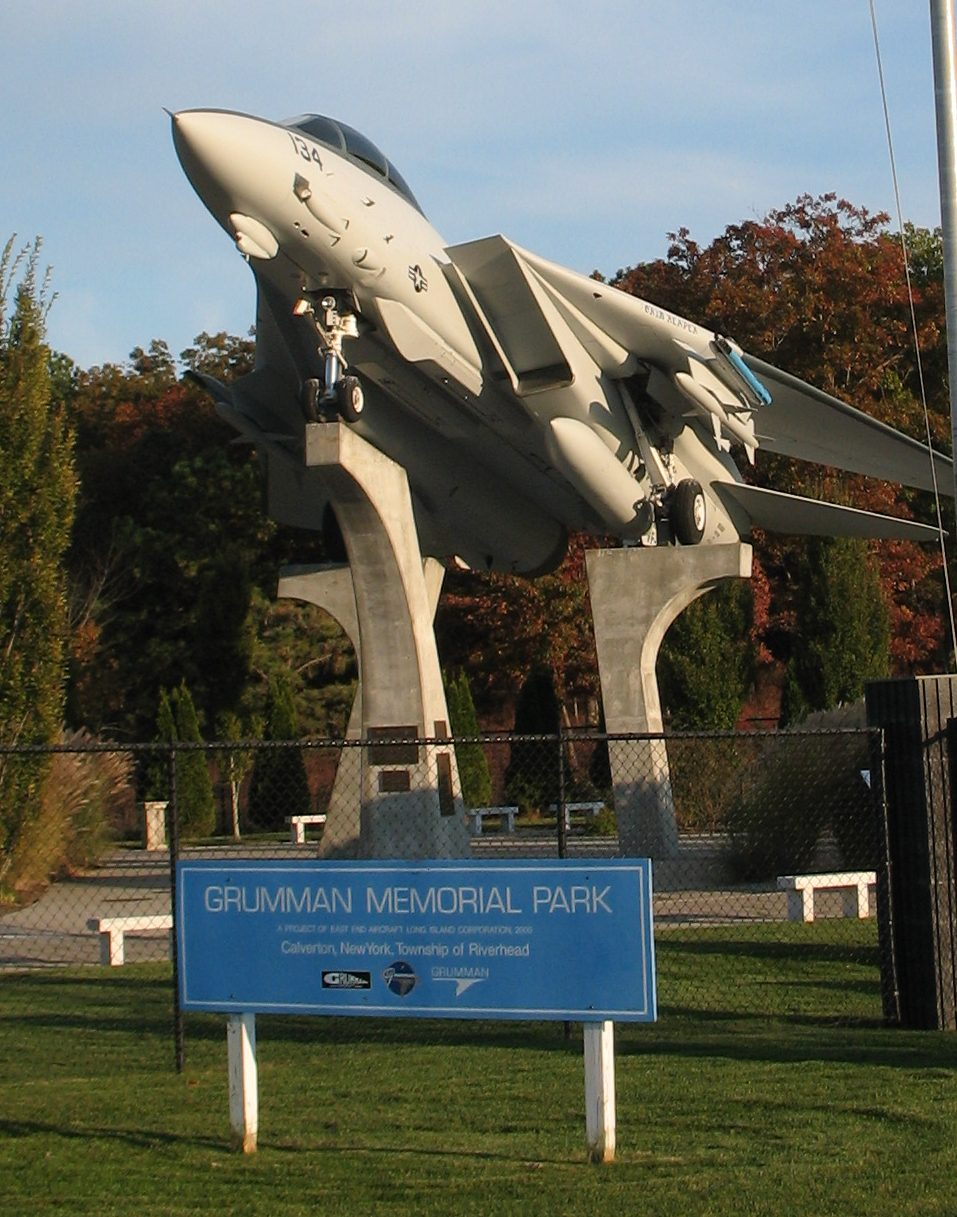
Grumman Memorial Park at Calverton

On February 11, 2010, it was announced that the dormant railway track into EPCAL would be reactivated for freight service. According to Railway Age magazine, Riverhead's town board awarded a $3.49 million contract to Railroad Construction Co., of Paterson, New Jersey, to activate a rail spur off of the Long Island Rail Road's Main Line out to Greenport, for New York & Atlantic Railway freight trains. The project is being paid largely through federal stimulus funding.

In 2017, a tentative deal was struck with the Town of Riverhead and Calverton Aviation and Technology (a joint venture with Luminati Aerospace and shopping mall developer Triple Five Real Estate I, LLC) to build solar power aircraft at EPCAL with Luminati initially saying it would employ 2,000 at the plant. Luminati Aerospace obtained tenancy at EPCAL in 2015, via the vacated Skydive Long Island space. As the plans to build planes fell into financial difficulties, the shopping mall developers were signed on to the deal. The full details of the project were still being discussed in 2018. In February 2018, Sustainable Power Group filed suit, saying it offered a higher bid for the property so it could become a solar farm.

== NHRA membership and events ==
In early 2021, The Town Board of Riverhead voted to approve the airport to host drag racing events for National Hot Rod Association (NHRA) Division 1 events, with the first events taking place in summer 2021 with Town Supervisor Yvette Aguiar driving a race car to "cut" through the ribbon in the inaugural ceremony. The event ended a 17-year hiatus of drag racing on Long Island and will host NHRA events approximately five times per year, in addition to non-NHRA town-sanctioned events dubbed the EPCAL Racing Series, as of 2022.

In 2022, The Town of Riverhead again voted to approve racing events at the airport for upcoming seasons.

== Ecology and endangered species ==
The airport contains the largest remaining grassland on Long Island, providing documented breeding and/or foraging habitat for numerous grassland birds, including at least one New York State endangered species (the short-eared owl) including five New York State Species of Special Concern (common nighthawk, grasshopper sparrow, vesper sparrow, horned lark, and whip-poor-will). New York State Department of Environmental Conservation notes these grasslands are the most productive breeding grounds for grasshopper sparrow in all of New York State.

EPCAL contains 10 kettle hole ponds which are documented breeding sites for the eastern tiger salamander, a New York State endangered species. The site also contains five additional reptile and amphibian species which are identified as Species of Special Concern in New York State (marbled salamander, eastern spadefoot, spotted turtle, eastern box turtle, and eastern hognose snake). A total of 24 amphibian and reptile species have been identified on or near the EPCAL property.

As discussions over whether the airport could be developed the New York State Department of Environmental Conservation announced in February 2008 that endangered short-eared owls and northern harriers had been spotted at the airport which would prompt the DEC to make the ultimate decision of future development.

== See also ==
- List of airports in New York
