= New York Marine Rescue Center =

Mammal rehabilitation center

The New York Marine Rescue Center in Riverhead, New York is New York state's sole mammal and sea turtle rehabilitation center. It was founded in 1996 as the Riverhead Foundation for Marine Research until a 2019 rebrand.
