= WolfBytes Radio =

Radio station at North Carolina State University

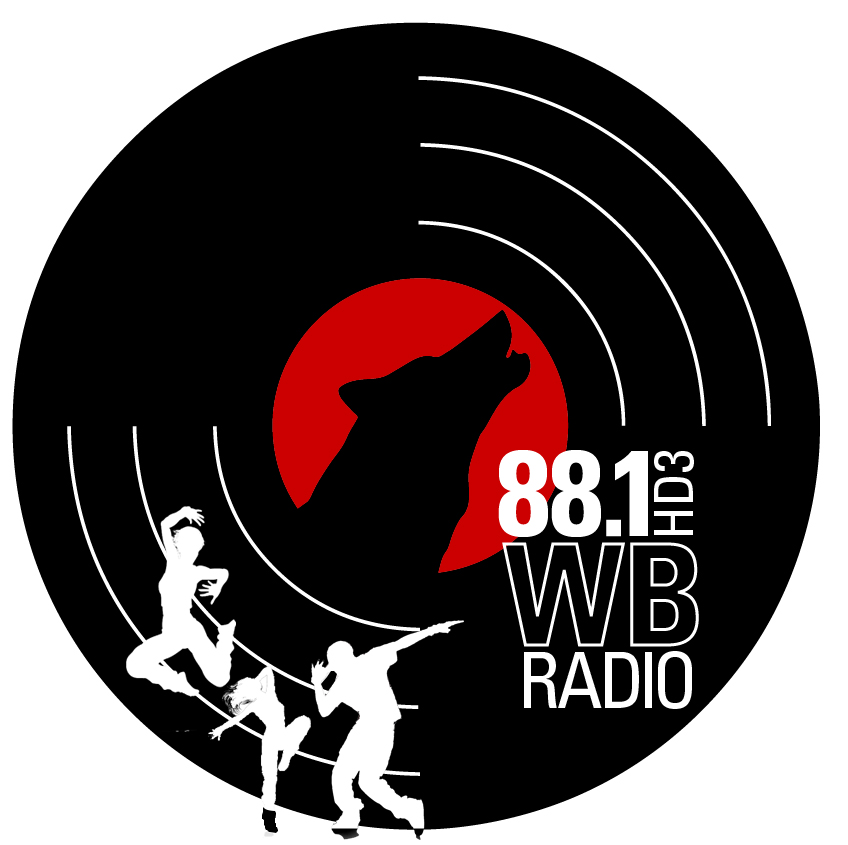
- Raleigh, North Carolina; United States
- Broadcast area: Raleigh-Durham, North Carolina
- Frequency: (88.1 HD-3) MHz (HD Radio)

Programming
- Format: Dance music

Ownership
- Owner: North Carolina State University

History
- First air date: August 2000

Technical information
- Licensing authority: FCC
- Facility ID: 49160
- Class: C3
- ERP: 25,000 watts
- HAAT: 79 meters (259 ft)
- Transmitter coordinates: 35°47′15″N 78°40′14″W

Links
- Public license information: Radio Public file; LMS
- Webcast: Listen live (via TuneIn)
- Website: wolfbytes.ncsu.edu

WolfBytes Radio is a dance radio station broadcasting on WKNC HD-3, Raleigh-Durham, Cary, and Chapel Hill, North Carolina in the Raleigh-Durham radio market. The station is run by the North Carolina State University Office of Information Technology and also streams on TuneIn Radio, Apple Radio, Online Radio Box. Broadcasting with an effective radiated power of 25,000 watts, its signal covers much of the Research Triangle and outlying areas. The station employs student DJs and is managed by full-time staff, broadcasting from its studios in the West Dunn Building on NC State's campus.

== Programming ==
WolfBytes Radio is hit-driven dance radio and CHR, consisting of current and recent dance and electronic music. The station has an interactive playlist that lists the songs in the order played as well as a weekly top tracks playlist that is reported to Spins Tracking System.

== Specialty programming ==
WolfBytes aired a WolfTraxx Top 10 Countdown hosted by Savannah Ford each Friday afternoon at 5 pm between 2018 and 2019.

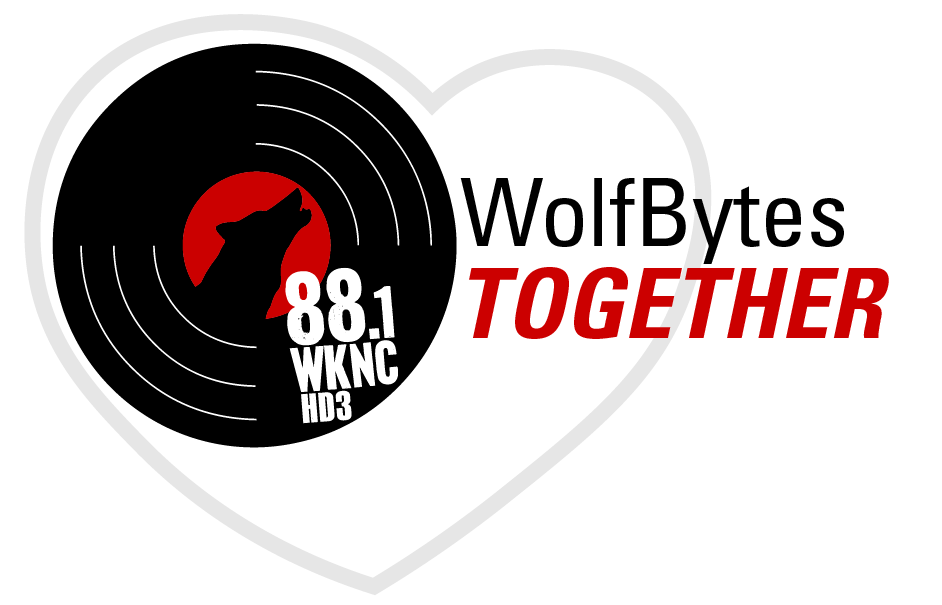
Logo for WolfBytes Together program that aired April 9, 2020.

WolfBytes staff put together a specialty show called WolfBytes Together as a response to the COVID-19 pandemic. The show aired on April 9, 2020, at 7 pm during the first hour of the DjWhtDaHek show and featured the entire WolfBytes staff playing upbeat, positive message songs that listeners could sing along to interspersed with NC State-specific pandemic information and interviews. The show was re-broadcast the following Saturday at 9 pm and then again that Sunday at noon.

WolfBytes began the Happy Hour, an all-request show designed to be uplifting with music from core artists and hosted by Chris Lehman, on Friday, April 24 at noon.

== Open Mic ==
WolfBytes Radio produces an audio podcast called Open Mic where DJs talk with dance artists in the industry. The podcast is distributed on iTunes, Google Play, TuneIn Podcasts and the station website. WolfBytes recently completed an Open Mic Week where it released a podcast a day.

=== Open Mic episodes ===
Date	Guest	Host
May 18, 2017	Lucas and Steve	Logan Sims
May 26, 2017	Trobi	Logan Sims
June 14, 2017	Ashley Wallbridge	Logan Sims
July 14, 2017	Feenixpawl	Logan Sims and DjWhtDaHek
September 13, 2017	Bassjackers	Logan Sims
December 22, 2017	Zak Selwaeh	Logan Sims and Brandon Bouché
January 10, 2018	Armin van Buuren	Logan Sims and DjWhtDaHek
March 7, 2018	Gryffin	Logan Sims and DjWhtDaHek
April 1, 2018	Shaun Frank	Logan Sims and Brandon Bouché
May 31, 2018	Elephante	Logan Sims and Brandon Bouché
July 27, 2018	Sophie Francis	DjWhtDaHek and Brandon Bouché
August 9, 2018	Two Friends	DjWhtDaHek and Brandon Bouché
December 19, 2018	Phantoms	Mr. Voice
February 27, 2019	NOTD	DjWhtDaHek and Austin Shirron
March 25, 2019	VASSY	Kid Kinetic
April 24, 2019	Zack Martino	DjWhtDaHek
May 18, 2019	Prime Music Festival - Bonnie X Clyde, Gryffin, Phantoms, Two Friends	Kid Kinetic
May 24, 2019	Morgan Page	DjWhtDaHek
August 22, 2019	Sam Feldt	Brandon Bouché and Mr. Voice
August 26, 2019	Cheat Codes	DjWhtDaHek
September 25, 2019	Zonderling	Kid Kinetic
October 8, 2019	Jax Jones	DjWhtDaHek
October 9, 2019	NOTD	Kid Kinetic
November 17, 2019	Gryffin	DjWhtDaHek
February 25, 2020	Sofi Tukker	Austin Shirron and Chris Lehman
March 23, 2020	ARTY	DjWhtDaHek
March 25, 2020	Bonka	Chris Lehman
April 14, 2020	Loud Luxury	DjWhtDaHek
May 5, 2020	Showtek	DjWhtDaHek
May 11, 2020	NERVO	Chris Lehman
June 15, 2020	Syn Cole	Chris Lehman
June 16, 2020	Salt Cathedral	Chris Lehman
June 17, 2020	Zookëper	Chris Lehman
June 18, 2020	Anabel Englund	DjWhtDaHek
June 19, 2020	Tritonal	DjWhtDaHek
June 25, 2020	The Him	Chris Lehman
July 1, 2020	Steve Kroeger	Chris Lehman
July 3, 2020	Don Diablo	DjWhtDaHek
July 8, 2020	Asher Postman	Chris Lehman
July 13, 2020	Joe Bermudez	DJ Oz
July 15, 2020	Dagny	DjWhtDaHek
August 5, 2020	Justin Caruso	Chris Lehman
September 4, 2020	Ace of Base	Chris Lehman
September 30, 2020	Audien	DjWhtDaHek
December 10, 2020	Man Cub	DjWhtDaHek
March 15, 2021	HALIENE	Chris Lehman and Nathan Wyatt-Ingram
March 30, 2021	Niiko x SWAE and April Bender	Nathan Wyatt-Ingram and Chris Lehman
April 20, 2021	LODATO	Chris Lehman
June 9, 2021	Linney	Nathan Wyatt-Ingram
August 6, 2021	Cash Cash	DjWhtDaHek
September 9, 2021	Lost Kings	Chris Lehman
September 29, 2021	Mahalo	DjWhtDaHek
January 21, 2022	ARMNHMR	Mr. Voice and Cade Cross
March 11, 2022	Afrojack	DjWhtDaHek
November 18, 2022	Conro	DJ Flame and Maddog
January 2023	Audien and Mahalo	DJ Flame and DjWhtDaHek
March 2023	DJ Licious	DJ Flame
April 2023	Breakaway Music Festival	Midnight Maddog
August 2023	Hariz	DJ Flame
September 2023	Theresa Rex	Emily Saliga
May 2024	Taylor Dayne	Mr. Voice/Flip Spiceman, Large Marge, Rusty Spoon
July 2024	Morgin Madison	Midnight Maddog
August 2024	KIESZA	DJ Flame
September 2024	Linney	Midnight Maddog, DjWhtDaHek
November 2024	MEDUZA	DJ Flame
December 2024	Vicetone	DJ Flame
January 2025	Hayla	Midnight Maddog
March 2025	Jared Lee	Burns
April 2025	Orjan Nilsen	DJ Flame
May 2025	Exposé	Midnight Maddog
October 2025	Z3LLA	Brooklyn Marion, DJ Smoke
February 2026	Ofenbach	DJ Flame
March 2026	Warren	Brooklyn Marion
April 2026	Jus Jack	DJ Flame
July 2026	Laidback Luke	DJ Flame

== DJs ==
WolfBytes Radio did not use DJs prior to 2016 other than for the year-end countdown shows. Year-end Countdown show DJs include DJ Kittens, Hal Meeks, Mr. Voice, Traci Fisher, Caitlin Zanga. 2017 DJs Nick Sinopoli, Drew Blevins, DJ Tif, Adam Obirek, Madison Bell, DjWhtDaHek, Kid Kinetic. Airchecks are available online. DjWhtDaHek began producing new music sweeps in late 2016 as the first semi-regular voice on WolfBytes.

2018 DJs

Kid Kinetic, Lulu Batta, Savannah Ford, DjWhtDaHek, Brandon Bouché

2019 DJs

Kid Kinetic, Kayla Glova, Austin Shirron, DjWhtDaHek, Brandon Bouché

2020 DJs

Kid Kinetic, Chris Lehman, Brandon Bouché/Austin Shirron, DjWhtDaHek, DJ Oz

2020 DJs

Chris Lehman, DJ Oz, Nathan Wyatt-Ingram, DjWhtDaHek

2021 DJs

Chris Lehman, DJ Oz, Nathan Wyatt-Ingram, DjWhtDaHek, Cade Cross

2022 DJs

Chris Lehman, Jordan Hatcher, Cade Cross, Sophie Ketron, DjWhtDaHek, Kid Kinetic, Ansley Disher, Hailey Self, DJ Flame, Midnight Maddog

2023 DJs

Sophie Ketron, DjWhtDaHek, Kid Kinetic, Ansley Disher, Hailey Self, DJ Flame, Midnight Maddog Jordan Hatcher, Emily Saglia, Collin Lawrence

2024 DJs

DjWhtDaHek, Kid Kinetic, AC, DJ Flame, Midnight Maddog, Emily Saglia, Collin Lawrence, REMI, Burns, No Name, DJ Smoke

2025 DJs

DjWhtDaHek, Kid Kinetic, DJ Flame, Midnight Maddog, Emily Saglia, Collin Lawrence, REMI, Burns, No Name, DJ Smoke

2026 DJs

DjWhtDaHek, Brooklyn Marion, DJ Flame, DJ Smoke, Kit, No Name, Myasia Minor

Weekends

Miranda McCullough, Jayleen Cerrillo, Alex Mieszczak, Alanna Bethea, Quincy Grier, Sam Feldt Heartfeldt Radio, Armada Radio, Afrojack's Jacked Radio, Frank Walker's Golden Era Radio, Illenium's Phoenix Radio, Tim Clark's Inspire Radio

== Awards ==
WolfBytes Radio program director BJ Attarian was nominated for a 2021 New Music Award for Program Director of the Year.

== History ==
- September 2000 - WolfBytes Radio signs on to NC State's cable system on channel 85, airing as accompanying music for WolfBytes Television and as office music for NC State's Communication Technologies.
- August 2003 - WolfBytes Radio (and Television) move to NC State cable channel 14.
- August 2007 - WolfBytes Radio begins to move from top 40 to a dance/CHR format.
- 2010 - WolfBytes Radio begins year-end countdowns.
- 2011 - WolfBytes Radio begins streaming over TuneIn Radio.
- 2012 - WolfBytes Radio begins streaming over iTunes Radio.
- 2013 - WolfBytes Radio begins reporting to College Music Journal.
- August 2016 - WolfBytes Radio begins to incorporate DJs outside of the year-end countdowns, beginning with DjWhtDaHek's new music sweeps.
- May 2017 - First WolfBytes Radio Open Mic.
- August 2017 - WolfBytes Radio incorporates DJs into all dayparts.
- 2017 - WolfBytes begins reporting to Spins Tracking Systems.
- May 3, 2019 - WolfBytes Radio begins broadcasting over WKNC HD-3.
