= Garfield M. Langhorn =

Decorated United States soldier (1948-1969)

Garfield McConnell Langhorn
- Army Medal of Honor
- Born: September 10, 1948; Cumberland, Virginia, US
- Died: January 15, 1969 (aged 20) near Plei Djereng Camp, Pleiku Province, South Vietnam
- Burial place: Calverton National Cemetery, Calverton, New York
- Military career
- Allegiance: United States
- Branch: United States Army
- Service years: 1968 - 1969
- Rank: Private First Class
- Units: 17th Cavalry Regiment, 1st Aviation Brigade
- Conflicts: Vietnam War †
- Awards: Medal of Honor; Purple Heart

Garfield McConnell Langhorn (September 10, 1948 – January 15, 1969) was a United States Army soldier and a recipient of America's highest military decoration—the Medal of Honor—for his actions in the Vietnam War.

== Biography ==
Born on September 10, 1948, in Cumberland, Virginia, Langhorn was living in Brooklyn, New York, when he was drafted into the U.S. Army in 1968. He served in Vietnam as a private first class and radio operator with Troop C, 7th Squadron (Airmobile), 17th Cavalry Regiment, 1st Aviation Brigade. On January 15, 1969, Langhorn's unit attempted to rescue the crew of a downed American helicopter near Plei Djereng in Pleiku Province, South Vietnam. After finding the crash site and the bodies of the dead crewmen, the unit turned back, only to be attacked by entrenched North Vietnamese forces. During the battle, Langhorn threw himself on an enemy hand grenade that had been thrown near several wounded soldiers. He was killed in the ensuing explosion, but succeeded in protecting the lives of his fellow soldiers.

Langhorn, aged 20 years at his death, was buried at Riverhead Cemetery in Riverhead, New York.

On September 27, 2010, the Riverhead, New York post office building was named the Private First Class Garfield M. Langhorn Post Office Building by the 111th United States Congress.

On July 3, 2026, Langhorn was disinterred from Riverhead Cemetery and reinterred at Calverton National Cemetery.

== Awards and decorations ==

Medal of Honor		Purple Heart Medal	
National Defense Service Medal	Vietnam Service Medal with campaign star	Republic of Vietnam Cross of Gallantry with palm	Republic of Vietnam Campaign Medal

=== Medal of Honor citation ===

Langhorn's official Medal of Honor citation reads:

For conspicuous gallantry and intrepidity in action at the risk of his life above and beyond the call of duty. Pfc. Langhorn distinguished himself while serving as a radio operator with Troop C, near Plei Djereng in Pleiku province. Pfc. Langhorn's platoon was inserted into a landing zone to rescue 2 pilots of a Cobra helicopter shot down by enemy fire on a heavily timbered slope. He provided radio coordination with the command-and-control aircraft overhead while the troops hacked their way through dense undergrowth to the wreckage, where both aviators were found dead. As the men were taking the bodies to a pickup site, they suddenly came under intense fire from North Vietnamese soldiers in camouflaged bunkers to the front and right flank, and within minutes they were surrounded. Pfc. Langhorn immediately radioed for help from the orbiting gunships, which began to place minigun and rocket fire on the aggressors. He then lay between the platoon leader and another man, operating the radio and providing covering fire for the wounded who had been moved to the center of the small perimeter. Darkness soon fell, making it impossible for the gunships to give accurate support, and the aggressors began to probe the perimeter. An enemy hand grenade landed in front of Pfc. Langhorn and a few feet from personnel who had become casualties. Choosing to protect these wounded, he unhesitatingly threw himself on the grenade, scooped it beneath his body and absorbed the blast. By sacrificing himself, he saved the lives of his comrades. Pfc. Langhorn's extraordinary heroism at the cost of his life was in keeping with the highest traditions of the military service and reflect great credit on himself, his unit, and the U.S. Army.

== See also ==
- List of Medal of Honor recipients for the Vietnam War
- List of African-American Medal of Honor recipients
