= Kate C. Woodhull =

American medical missionary

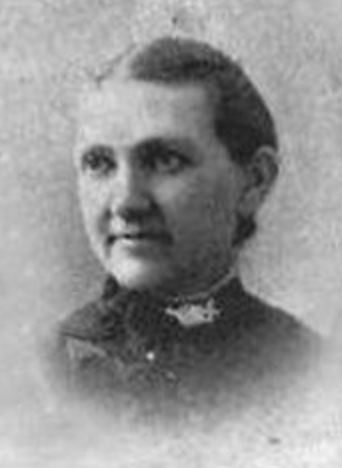
- Kate C. Woodhull, from a 1900 newspaper
- Born: July 24, 1842; Wading River, New York, U.S.
- Died: March 25, 1926 (aged 83); Riverhead, New York, U.S.
- Occupations: Physician, medical missionary in China

Catherine "Kate" C. Woodhull (July 24, 1842 – March 25, 1926) was an American physician and medical missionary who ran a hospital in Fuzhou, China, from 1884 to 1912.

== Early life and education ==
Woodhull was born in Wading River, New York, the daughter of Noah Hallock Woodhull and Hannah Conklin Woodhull. She earned her medical degree from the New York Medical College for Women in 1873, with further studies in Zürich and Dresden.

== Career ==
Woodhull taught school as a young woman. She practiced medicine in Smyrna, Delaware, and was house physician at a foundling hospital in Chicago. She sailed for China as a medical missionary in 1884. She trained Chinese women physicians and treated patients at a Christian mission in Foochow (Fuzhou) for 28 years. Her younger sister Hannah C. Woodhull was also a missionary, as a teacher at Foochow.

Woodhull founded and ran a hospital for women and children at Foochow. "New paint and fresh whitewash will not heal disease," she wrote to colleagues in 1895 of her policies, "but it makes a good impression on the heathen if the hospital has a thrifty appearance." Both sisters retired from mission work and returned to the United States in 1912. She was succeeded as head of the hospital by Lora G. Dyer. She spoke to American church and women's groups about her experiences in China, and at the Woman's Board of Foreign Missions meeting in Boston in 1893.

The Woodhull sisters had a furlough in the United States in 1896 and 1897. They were "ardent advocates of enfranchising women" and both lived to vote in Suffolk County in 1918.

== Publications ==
- "Foochow" (1895)
- "A Plea for Hygiene" (1901)

== Personal life and legacy ==
Woodhull died in 1926, at the age of 83, in Riverhead, New York. The Kate C. Woodhull Hospital for Women was dedicated in 1925, to mark the 40th anniversary of her arrival in China.
