= KXRG-LP =

Honolulu, Hawaii; United States
- Frequency: 95.9 MHz
- Branding: My 95.9

Programming
- Language: English
- Format: Dance radio

Ownership
- Owner: Ohana Broadcasters Corporation

History
- First air date: March 2006
- Former frequencies: 101.1 FM (2006–2007)
- Call sign meaning: XRG=NRG (previous branding)

Technical information
- Licensing authority: FCC
- Facility ID: 132054
- Class: L1
- ERP: 100 watts
- HAAT: −39.0 meters (−128.0 ft)
- Transmitter coordinates: 21.3306°N 157.8566°W

Links
- Public license information: LMS
- Webcast: Listen Live
- Website: www.my959.com

KXRG-LP (95.9 FM) is a non-commercial dance radio outlet serving the Honolulu, Hawaii area. The station is owned by a non-profit group called Ohana Broadcasters Corporation and is licensed to Honolulu.

== Station history ==
From March 2006 to July 2007, KXRG-LP was on 101.1 MHz as "Energy 101.1". On July 1, 2007, the commercial full power station KORL-FM took over the frequency forcing KXRG-LP off the air. Full power stations have priority over low power stations and no frequencies were available for KXRG-LP at that time. The station was silent from July 2007 until April 29, 2010, when KXRG-LP received permission from the FCC to begin broadcasting effective immediately.

== Programming ==
Most of the programming on KXRG is a list of mixshows, which air everyday from 7 pm-5 am. The mix shows include DJs such as Chicane, Nicole Moudaber, Chris Liebing, Eats Everything, Steve Aoki, Armin van Buuren, Jamie Jones, Sister Bliss, Nicky Romero, Paul van Dyk, Don Diablo, Joris Voorn, DJ EZ, Paul Oakenfold, Amelie Lens, Lucas & Steve, Timmy Trumpet, Afrojack, R3hab, Cosmic Gate, Judge Jules, Futuristic Polar Bears, Bingo Players, Mark Doyle, Robin Schulz, Vintage Culture, Zeds Dead, Tritonal, Wax Motif, Mark Knight, Adam Beyer, Above & Beyond, and more.

On Sunday mornings, KXRG airs an EDM-themed gospel show based in Riviera FM, a station owned by Christ Church, Paignton.
