= KRYC-LP =

Coordinates: 39.125°N 121.621°W

- Yuba City, California; United States
- Frequency: 105.9 MHz
- Branding: Rhythm 105.9

Programming
- Format: Rhythmic CHR / Dance Hits
- Affiliations: Compass Media Networks

Ownership
- Owner: Irshad Ali Foundation

History
- First air date: June 18, 2003
- Call sign meaning: "Rhythm Yuba City"

Technical information
- Licensing authority: FCC
- Facility ID: 124521
- Class: L1
- ERP: 100 watts

Links
- Public license information: LMS
- Webcast: Listen Live
- Website: rhythm1059fm.com

KRYC-LP, also known as Rhythm 105.9, is a Rhythmic / Dance Top 40 hybrid outlet serving the Yuba City, CA, area. The station, which is owned by Irshad Ali Foundation and whose city of license is Yuba City, California, United States, broadcasts at 105.9 MHz.
