= Restoration Advisory Board =

American environmental information forum

A Restoration Advisory Board or RAB is a group, which meets on a regular basis to discuss environmental restoration at a US military installation currently or formerly used and owned by the US Department of Defense (DoD). These developed in the 1990s when DOD locally and nationally engaged people from communities impacted by military contamination. As of 2015, there were 229 RABs on 250 installations.

== Legal requirement ==
A Restoration Advisory Board (RAB) is a group, which meets on a regular basis to discuss environmental restoration at a US military installation currently or formerly used and owned by the US Department of Defense (DoD). The DoD organizes and funds RABs to comply with the public notice and public participation requirements of the Comprehensive Environmental Response, Compensation, and Liability Act, the Resource Conservation and Recovery Act and other laws. It is a forum for the public to address environmental restoration which the military conducts under its Defense Environmental Restoration Program and under the Military Munitions Response program. The latter includes clean up of unexploded ordnance, discarded military munitions and the chemical constituents of munitions, such as heavy metals.

== Organization ==
A RAB can be formed when there is "sufficient and sustained community interest" and one of the following criteria is met:

- The installation is closing and transferring property to the community;
- At least 50 local citizens petitioned for a RAB;
- Federal, tribal, state, or local government representatives requested a RAB; or
- The installation determined the need for a RAB.

Some communities at contaminated military installations may never form a RAB, or it may take decades such as Wurtsmith Air Force Base, which in November 2017, more than twenty-two years after being listed as a superfund site held its first Restoration Advisory Board meeting.

A RAB is chaired by the installation commander and a community co-chair. Members include health officials, tribal members, local governments, state officials and Federal representatives. The regulatory agency which is responsible to oversee environmental restoration provides one representative to participate in the RAB, so at superfund sites, Environmental Protection Agency (EPA) and tribal, state, and local governments each will have a representative. The installation commander appoints interested community RAB members. The RAB selects a community co-chair.

RAB meetings are open to public participation and take place on the military installation "in a manner or place reasonably accessible", though as of 2022, many meetings were held offsite in a school, theater or community hall.

Each RAB is responsible for its mission statement, developing its own goals and objectives, and standard operating procedures, including recording, approving, and distributing meeting minutes. Voting or polling members is not a requisite action of RABs and the DOD is not bound by polls.

== History ==
Beginning in 1990s, the DOD locally and nationally engaged people from communities impacted by military contamination in forums and trainings. In 1993, the EPA established a forum, the Federal Facilities Environmental Restoration Dialogue Committee (FFERDC). The committee worked out principles which should apply to all persons and institutions involved in the process for making federal facility cleanup decisions. The principles covered four key areas: 1) information sharing, 2) ensuring environmental justice, 3) establishing restoration advisory boards, and 4) understanding the federal budget process.

In September 1994, DoD and the EPA issued guidelines how to form and operate RABs. As of September 2004, DoD reported that 310 RABs existed "across all of the Military Component's installations".

In 2006, DoD issued a rule on RABs and it published a RAB handbook in 2007.

In FY 2015, DoD spent $2.8 million to support 229 RABs on 250 installations and properties.

During the COVID-19 pandemic, RAB meetings either became online meetings or hybrid events like at the Wurtsmith Air Force Base or they stalled altogether, as in the case of Camp Lejeune, which for 18 months from February 2020 until August 2021 didn't meet.

== Criticism ==
According to some, the role of an installation co-chair unfairly exceeds that of a community co-chair. Also, the power of RABs is very limited, as RABs are not decision-making bodies and the installation is not required to follow RAB recommendations.

When the installation command is not responsive to community concerns, not acting in a transparent manner, RAB community members interest may dwindle, a situation encountered for example at Naval Weapons Industrial Reserve Plant, Calverton. Community members may resign, and if the installation does not actively pursue community outreach, the commander may dissolve a RAB.

In a May 2021 meeting of the Wurtsmith Air Force Base RAB, a conceptual site model presentation which took half of the three-hour event did not receive the most feedback. Instead, that a RAB member's comments were interrupted after less than three minutes prompted the most discussion.

On one occasion, a County Commissioner was opposed to the formation of a RAB ( at Cannon Air Force Base), stating it would eliminate on-going quarterly public updates outreach efforts.

== See also ==
- Environmental racism
