= KGAY-FM =

Radio station in Palm Desert, California

- Palm Desert, California; United States
- Broadcast area: Palm Springs—Coachella Valley
- Frequency: 103.1 MHz (HD Radio)
- Branding: KGAY 103.1

Programming
- Language: English
- Format: LGBTQ+ community Dance radio
- Subchannels: HD2: Sunny 106.5 (Adult contemporary)

Ownership
- Owner: Brad Fuhr; (KGAY PSP)
- Sister stations: KFSQ

History
- First air date: November 28, 1977
- Former call signs: KCMS (1977–1983); KEZN (1983–2018); KQPS (2018–2023); KMEE (2023–2025)
- Call sign meaning: "Gay"

Technical information
- Licensing authority: FCC
- Facility ID: 11747
- Class: A
- ERP: 1,900 watts
- HAAT: 180 meters (590 ft)
- Transmitter coordinates: 33.866°N 116.433°W
- Translator: HD2: 106.5 K293CL (Thousand Palms)

Links
- Public license information: Public file; LMS
- Webcast: Listen live
- Website: kgaypalmsprings.com; 1065sunny.com (HD2)

KGAY-FM (103.1 FM, "KGAY") is a radio station licensed to Palm Desert, California. Owned by KGAY PSP, it broadcasts an LGBTQ+ community-targeted dance radio format serving the Coachella Valley.

The station broadcasts in the HD Radio format; its HD2 subchannel carries an adult contemporary format as Sunny 106.5; the format is simulcast on the translator 106.5 K293CL.

Its studios are located on E. Ramon Road in Palm Springs, while its transmitter is off Varner Road in Cathedral City, amid other Palm Springs-area FM and TV towers.

== History ==
=== Classical KCMS ===
FM 103.1 first signed on the air on November 27, 1977. Its call sign was KCMS, playing classical music. The station was founded by broadcast engineer Paul Posen under his company, Classic Broadcasting. The original studios were located in Indio, California.

In October 1983, the station changed its call letters to KEZN. By 1987, the studios were moved to a new facility in Palm Desert.

=== Switch to soft AC ===
In the early 1990s, the station switched to the nationally syndicated "Format 41" soft adult contemporary service of the Unistar Radio Network. In 1994, KEZN became the only AC station in the Palm Springs market when KPLM flipped to a country music format. Noted Los Angeles broadcaster Russ O'Hara teamed with local personality Kayla Stone for the Russ and Kayla morning drive show, as the station eliminated the Format 41 service to go with local programming.

Another local disc jockey, Debra Kaye Ahlers, occupied the midday shift, while program director Dale Berg, a noted personality from Orange County, handled afternoon drive. Later, former Nashville Network announcer Dan McGrath took over morning drive, while former KCLB personality John O (John Ostrum) assumed the afternoon slot. In 1996, Gary Bell arrived from KCBS-FM in Los Angeles. Ryan Yamanaka also served as an on-air personality from 2000 to 2001 working the overnight shift. He was also the last personality to drive KEZN's "Mr. Frosty". The early personalities helped propel KEZN to be among the top rated stations in Palm Springs.

=== CBS ownership ===
In June 1998, Posen sold his interest in the station to CBS Radio (which would later merge with Infinity Broadcasting, and would rename under the Infinity banner). Through the early 2000s, the station's format was moved from soft AC to mainstream adult contemporary. Each year from mid-November to December 25, KEZN switched to all-Christmas music. Infinity would be renamed CBS Radio in December 2005.

On December 26, 2014, after its annual Christmas format wrapped up, KEZN rebranded as "103.1 Sunny FM", with no other changes. During its Sunny FM years, the station aired the syndicated program America's Greatest Hits, hosted by Scott Shannon, on weekends.

=== Entercom/Audacy ownership ===
On February 2, 2017, CBS Radio announced it would merge with Entercom, the forerunner of Audacy. The merger was approved on November 9, 2017, and was consummated on November 17. Also in 2017, KEZN relocated to the old R&R Broadcast building in Palm Springs, located on Tahquitz Canyon Way.

On November 1, 2018, KEZN flipped to Entercom's LGBTQ-targeted talk/EDM network branded as "Channel Q", marking the first analog FM station adopting the format, which had previously been exclusive to HD Radio subchannels. The next day, KEZN changed its call sign to KQPS. The station was a reporter in Billboard's Dance/Mix Show Airplay panel.

By early 2023, KQPS was one of three terrestrial stations in the "Channel Q" network. In addition to the local Palm Springs signal, Channel Q was heard on a number of Audacy's HD Radio subchannels across the country, as well as on the Audacy internet radio platform and mobile phone application. Network hosts included Jai Rodriguez, John Duran, and Shira Lazar.

=== Brad Fuhr ownership ===
In February 2023, Audacy announced that the company would sell KQPS to Brad Fuhr, who also owns KGAY (1270 AM) and the Gay Desert Guide website, for $600,000. In late 2022, Audacy had transferred the station's license into a subsidiary, Audacy Atlas, for assets designated for sale. Fuhr began operating KQPS via a local marketing agreement (LMA) on March 6, which would last until the sale's completion. That same day, KQPS abandoned Channel Q programming and began simulcasting KGAY.

On March 8, 2023, at 6 am, KQPS flipped to a soft oldies format from the MeTV FM network, branded as 103.1 MeTV Music. The sale to Fuhr's KGAY PSP was completed on June 1, 2023. The call sign change to KMEE took effect on June 15. On January 23, 2025, KMEE began to broadcast in HD Radio.

On December 26, 2025, KGAY PSP began to move 92.1 KGAY-FM's programming to 103.1, giving it a full market signal to replace KGAY-FM's rimshot, its HD Radio simulcast on KMEE-HD2, and its translator 106.5 K293CL. The station dropped its oldies format and swapped call signs with KGAY-FM; on January 1, 2026, KGAY-HD2/K293CL flipped to a gold-based adult contemporary format as Sunny 106.5, which focuses on hits from the 90's and 2000's. Fuhr stated that K293CL had been "one of the most successful low power translators in the country", and that the migration to 103.1 would give it stronger coverage across the Coachella Valley. The MeTV FM format later returned to 92.1 in August 2026.
