= Naval Weapons Industrial Reserve Plant, Calverton =

- Part of United States Navy
- Riverhead, New York

Site information
- Type: Aircraft manufacturing plant
- Controlled by: Navy
- Open to the public: Partially

Location
- Coordinates: 40°54′45″N 72°47′44″W

Site history
- In use: 1956–1996

Calverton Executive Airpark
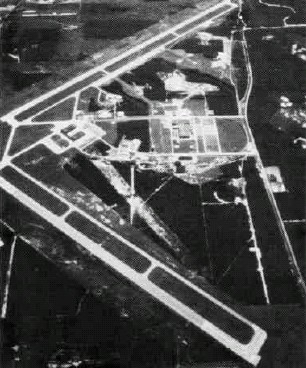
- Calverton in 1979–1980
- IATA: CTO; ICAO: none; FAA LID: CTO

Summary
- Airport type: Public-owned, private-use
- Owner: Town of Riverhead
- Location: Calverton, New York
- Elevation AMSL: 75 ft (23 m)
- Coordinates: 40°54′54″N 072°47′31″W
- Interactive map of Calverton Executive Airpark

Runways
Direction	Length		Surface
Direction	ft	m	Surface
14/32	10,000	3,048	Asphalt/concrete
5/23	7,000	2,133	Asphalt/concrete
- Source: Federal Aviation Administration

Naval Weapons Industrial Reserve Plant, Calverton (NWIRP) was a government-owned, contractor-operated (GOCO) facility which had the mission of designing, fabricating, and testing prototype aircraft from 1956 until 1996, in Riverhead, New York, United States.

After transfer from the United States Navy, it is now home to Calverton National Cemetery and Calverton Executive Airpark.

== Geography ==
The Naval Weapons Industrial Reserve Plant (NWIRP) is located on Grumman Boulevard in Calverton, New York. The facility is in a rural area, bordered by Middle County Road (route 25) to the north, agricultural land to the east, River Road to the south, and Wading River Road to the west. It is also in close proximity to North Fork (Long Island) and South Fork (Long Island) ("Hamptons") communities, within 60 miles of JFK International Airport, La Guardia Airport, and Islip MacArthur Airport.

== History ==
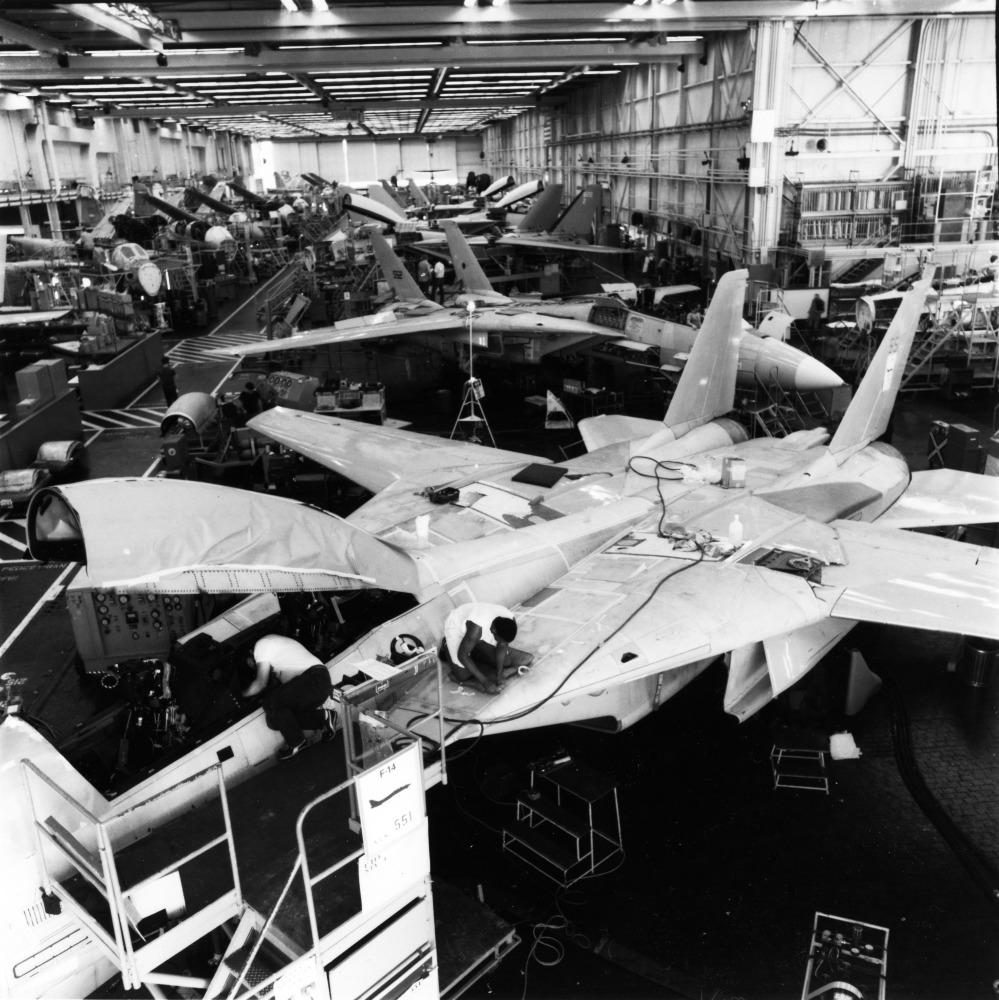
Line of production of the F-14A Tomcat in 1986

In about 1950, the United States Navy purchased about 6,000 acres (2,400 ha) on the Peconic River by New York Route 25 for the facility. Among the properties purchased was a mansion belonging to the grandson of F.W. Woolworth.

The Navy built, among other things, a 10,000-foot (3,000 m) runway. It is labeled on topographic maps as Grumman Peconic River Airport with an FAA code of CTO.

The plant was most associated with assembling, flight testing, refitting, and retrofitting naval aircraft like the Grumman A-6 Intruder, E-2 Hawkeye, EA-6B Prowler and Grumman F-14 Tomcat. Older U.S. Navy and U.S. Marine Corps aircraft such as the F9F Panther, F-9 Cougar, and F-11 Tiger were also tested at the facility. They also conducted fire fighting training exercises. The Grumman site consisted of "Plant Six", where final assembly of F-14s, A-6s, EA-6Bs, and E-2Cs took place, and "Plant Seven" for Flight Test.

During the Space Race, Grumman built a mockup of the lunar surface to test its proposed Lunar Roving Vehicle. Many of the lunar astronauts were said to have visited the plant then.

In 1965, New York Governor Nelson Rockefeller proposed converting the airport into the fourth New York City metropolitan airport, joining Laguardia Airport, John F. Kennedy Airport and Newark Airport. The proposal was abandoned following opposition from both Grumman and local residents.

In 1974, when the two National Cemeteries on Long Island (Cypress Hills National Cemetery and Long Island National Cemetery) were running out of space, the Navy was approached about donating its undeveloped land north of Route 25 for a cemetery. On December 7, 1977, a 902 acres (365 ha) tract was donated to form Calverton National Cemetery. In 2000, more land would be donated by the Navy bringing the total to 1,045 acres (423 ha) making it the largest national cemetery in the United States.

In 1994, Grumman merged with Northrop Corporation, forming Northrop Grumman Corporation, and the new firm eliminated almost all operations on Long Island. On February 14, 1996, Grumman vacated the site.

On July 17, 1996, TWA Flight 800 exploded on departure from John F. Kennedy International Airport at about 13,000 feet, falling into the Atlantic off of Long Island. The NTSB brought the wreckage to a hangar it had leased in Calverton for examination and reconstruction of the Boeing 747. It was stored here until 2003, when it was moved to an NTSB facility in Ashburn, Virginia.

In September 1998, about 2,640 acres of developed property were transferred to the Town of Riverhead for redevelopment on the condition it be used for economic development to replace thousands of well-paid jobs and tax base lost by the Grumman closure (Enterprise Park, EPCAL). The airport has since been developed into Calverton Executive Airpark.

== Environmental contamination ==
In the mid-1980s, the Navy and Grumman knew, that their operations on the site had contaminated groundwater, according to court documents of an insurance case between Northrop Grumman and its liability insurance companies. As of 2022, heavy metals, PCBs and other Semi-Volatile Organic Compound, pesticides, and volatile organic compounds (VOCs) contaminate soil and groundwater, and impacting indoor air from groundwater vapor intrusion to some extent. Importantly, the site is located above the Long Island groundwater aquifer, the sole source of drinking water for Long Island. The contaminated groundwater is leaching into adjacent surface waters and their bottom sediments. There is evidence that groundwater contamination has migrated off-site to the South: from sites 6A, a site called Old Fuel Calibration where in 1987, a groundwater recovery unit was installed and from 10B (Engine Test House, drainage swale and culvert) where from the late 1980s to the early 1990s, groundwater from Site 6A was discharged.

Water supply wells are not used for drinking water, but irrigation. Recent hydrogeologic investigations have demonstrated that the contaminated groundwater migrates towards the Peconic River.

In 1999, about 2,935 acres of undeveloped land from the site were transferred to the New York State Department of Environmental Conservation (NYSDEC) for wildlife management, and 140 acres were transferred to the U.S. Department of Veterans Affairs for expansion of the Calverton National Cemetery. As of 2022, the remaining 358 acres (five separate parcels) are still owned by the U.S. Navy, and are being cleaned up.

Since April 28, 1998, the Calverton Restoration Advisory Board has been overseeing the Navy cleanup, including at Enterprise Park (EPCAL). As of June 2021, the Department of the Navy admitted on-site groundwater and soil contamination with PFAS and was "undertaking a comprehensive strategy to address releases of PFAS from Navy facilities like NWIRP", but denied responsibility for off-site groundwater pollution. When PFAs detected in 15% of the private residential wells south of the site were above New York's maximum contaminant levels, Navy maintained it was not bound by the state's limits, since there were no federal limits yet.
