= KMEE (FM) =

- Thermal, California; United States
- Broadcast area: Coachella Valley
- Frequency: 92.1 MHz
- Branding: 92.1 MeTV FM

Programming
- Language: English
- Format: Oldies

Ownership
- Owner: WKW Broadcasting
- Operator: KGAY PSP
- Sister stations: KFSQ, KXCM

History
- First air date: November 2, 1995
- Former call signs: KHWX (1993–1994, CP); KKJT (1994–1999); KDHI (1999–2004); KQCM (2004–2011); KKCM (2011–2024); KGAY-FM (2024–2025)
- Call sign meaning: Derived from MeTV

Technical information
- Licensing authority: FCC
- Facility ID: 16771
- Class: A
- ERP: 1,300 watts
- HAAT: 215 meters (705 watts)
- Transmitter coordinates: 33°39′18″N 115°59′13″W

Links
- Public license information: Public file; LMS
- Webcast: Listen live
- Website: 921metvfm.com

KMEE (92.1 FM, "MeTV FM") is a radio station licensed to Thermal, California. Owned by WKW Broadcasting and operated by KGAY PSP, it broadcasts an oldies format serving the Coachella Valley.

KMEE is a Class A station with an effective radiated power (ERP) of 1,300 watts, using a directional antenna. The station's transmitter is south of Interstate 10 in Cactus City.

== History ==
The station signed on the air on November 2, 1995. While it was still unbuilt, the station's call sign was KHWX, and went on the air as KKJT. In 1999, it became KDHI, then KQCM, then KKCM.

On March 4, 2024, after being sold to WKW Broadcasting, the station was taken over by KGAY PSP, and flipped from country music to an FM simulcast of AM station 1270 KGAY in Thousand Palms as KGAY-FM, giving it improved coverage in the eastern Coachella Valley. In April 2025, the station became the KGAY format's main signal, after 1270 flipped back to sports radio as KFSQ; the station would also be fed to an HD Radio subchannel of new sister station KMEE, as well the analog translator 106.5 K293CL in Thousand Palms, to achieve full market coverage.

On December 25, 2025, KGAY began to transition to KMEE's full market signal, with the KMEE calls moving to 92.1 and both stations performing an interim simulcast. On January 1, 2026, K293CL switched to an adult contemporary format as "Sunny 106.5."

On August 3, 2026, KMEE flipped to soft oldies as 92.1 MeTV FM; the format previously aired on KGAY from March 2023 to December 2025.
