= Riverhead, New York =

- Town
- Town of Riverhead
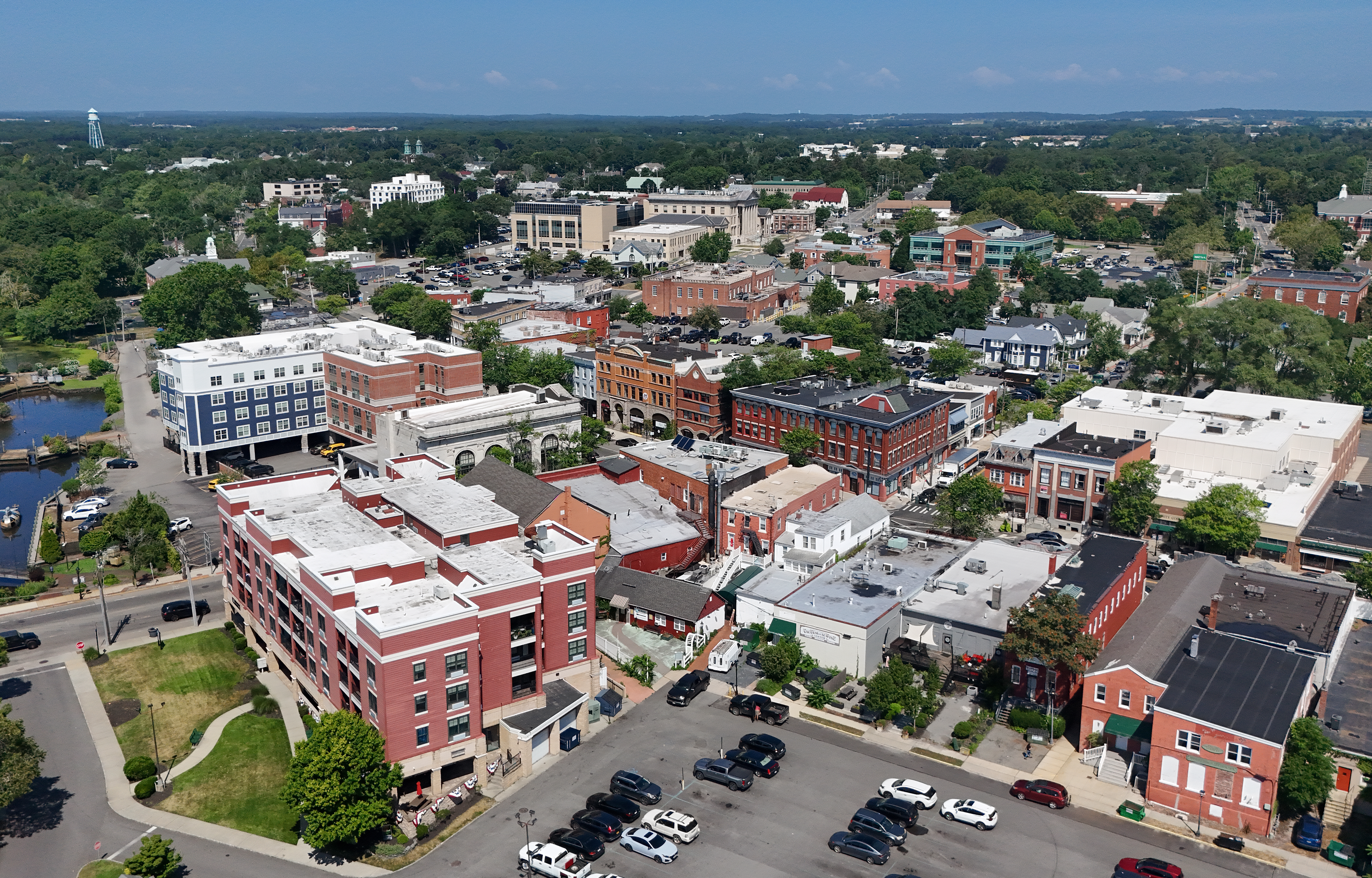
- The downtown area of the hamlet of Riverhead – the town seat – in 2025

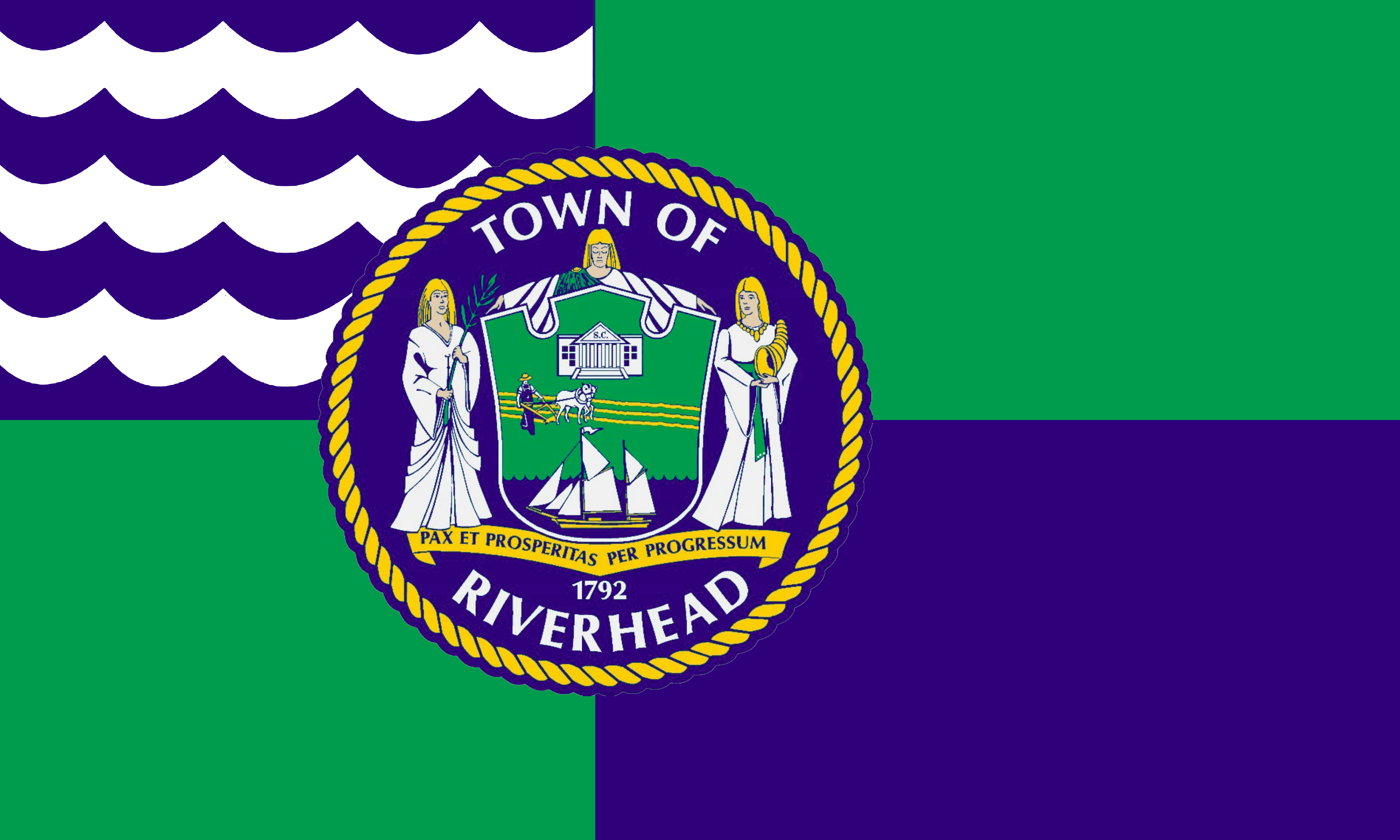
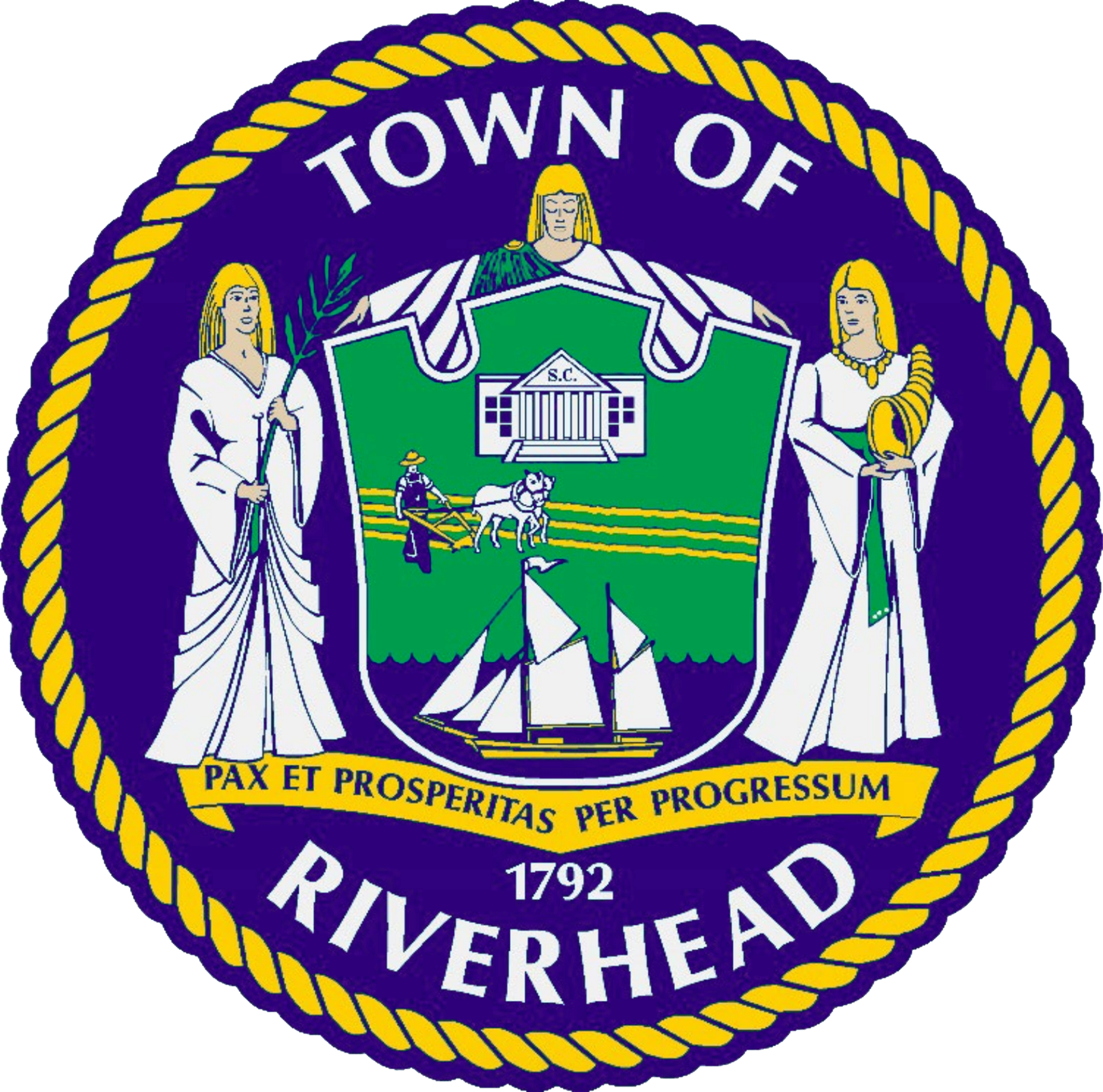
- Flag Seal
- Motto: Pax et prosperitas per progressum (Latin: "Peace and prosperity through progress")
- Location in Suffolk County and the state of New York
- Coordinates: 40°58′3″N 72°42′9″W
- Country: United States
- State: New York
- County: Suffolk
- Incorporated as a town: 1792
- Named for: Its location along the mouth of the Peconic River

Government
  - Type: Town council
  - Town Supervisor: Jerome Halpin (D)

Area
  - Town: 201.27 sq mi (521.28 km^{2})
  - Land: 67.43 sq mi (174.63 km^{2})
  - Water: 133.84 sq mi (346.65 km^{2})
- Elevation: 13 ft (4 m)

Population (2020)
  - Town: 35,902
  - Estimate (2016): 33,637
  - Density: 532.5/sq mi (205.59/km^{2})
  - Urban: 51,120
- Time zone: UTC−5 (Eastern (EST))
  - Summer (DST): UTC−4 (EDT)
- ZIP Code: 11901
- Area codes: 631, 934
- FIPS code: 36-103-61984
- Website: www.townofriverheadny.gov

Riverhead (historically spelled River Head) is a town in Suffolk County, on the North Shore and North Fork of Long Island, in New York, United States. The population was 35,902 at the time of the 2020 census.

The town rests on the mouth of the Peconic River, from which it derives its name. The smaller hamlet of Riverhead lies within it, and is the town's principal economic center. The town is 166 miles (267 km) southwest of Boston via the Orient Point–New London Ferry, and is 76 miles (122 km) northeast of New York City.

The Town of Riverhead is the agricultural apex of Long Island, with 20,000 of the 35,000 acres (14,000 ha) of the island's farmland located within the town. The town is also home to four separate beaches which are open year-round. Iron Pier, Wading River, and Reeves Beach each offer boating access for residents and visitors alike.

== History ==
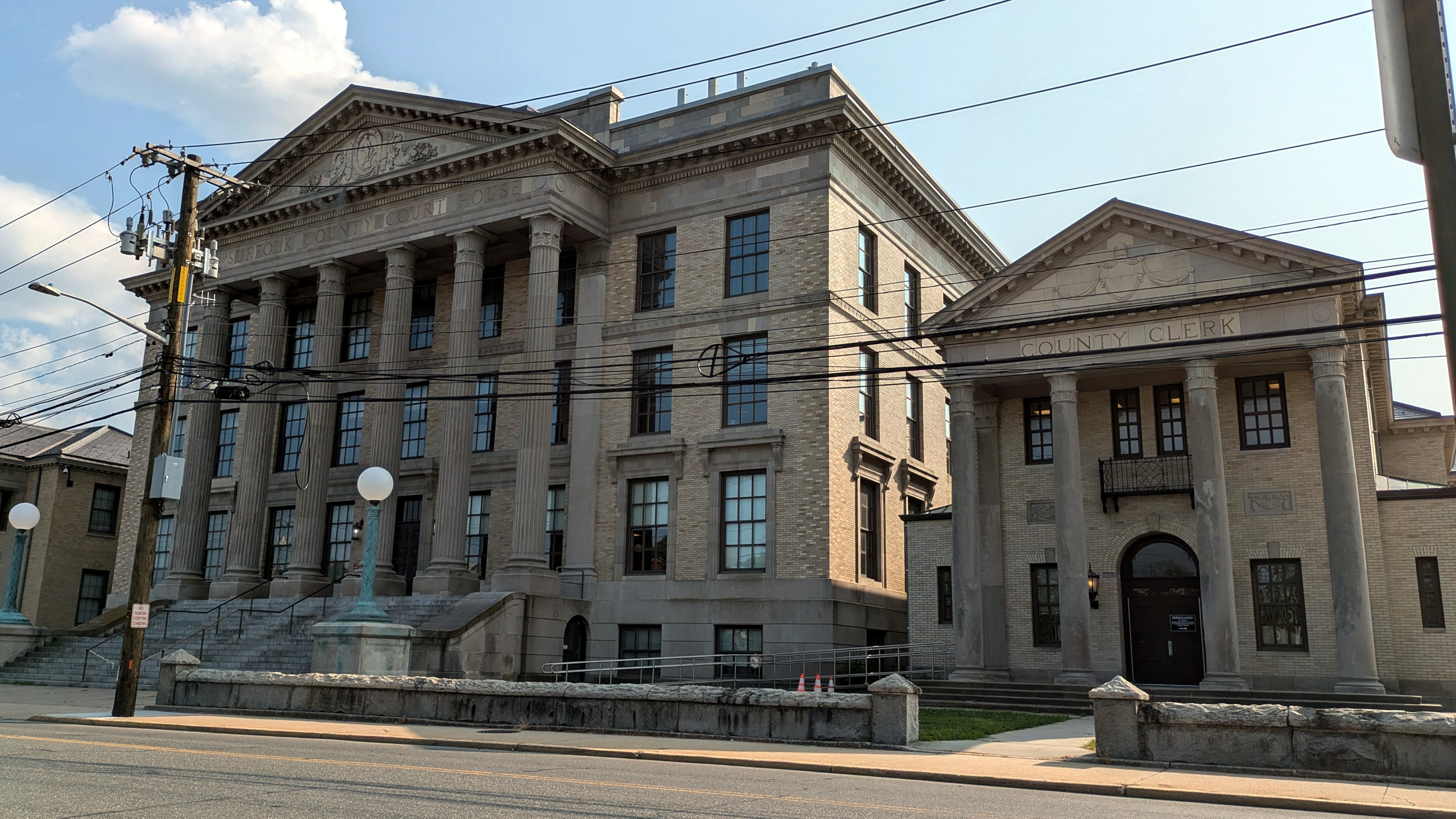
The Suffolk County Supreme Court and County Clerk's office

European colonists purchased the "Southold land" from the local Algonquian-speaking Native Americans and Shinnecock Indian Nation in 1649. An additional portion was purchased from Col. William Smith and divided among settlers in 1742.

Since 1727, the eponymous hamlet within the Town of Riverhead has been the county seat of Suffolk County – although most county offices have been in Hauppauge further west since the 1960s; this has spurred efforts by the five easternmost towns in Suffolk County – East Hampton, Riverhead, Southamton, Southold, and Shelter Island – to secede from the county to form Peconic County.

The town of Riverhead was created in 1792 as part of new jurisdictions after the American Revolution. The New York State Legislature divided it from the town of Southold, New York, which lies to the north and east. Riverhead was separated at the behest of its inhabitants, who "represented to the Legislature that their town is so long that it is very inconvenient for them [people of western regions of Southold] to attend at [sic] town meetings, and also to transact the other necessary business of the said town, and have prayed that the same may be divided into two towns". The poor western sections of Southold, with no harbor and little commerce, were thus divided. On March 13, 1792, the Legislature passed a bill splitting off this section under the name River Head. The new enclave's first town meeting was scheduled to be held April 3, 1792.

River Head was named the county seat of Suffolk County (called a "county town" at the time), and its name was later combined as Riverhead.

By 1902, the town's approximate population was 2,500.

In the beginning of the 20th century, the town saw an influx of Polish immigrants. This led to the creation of Polish Town, a section of the town and county seat where the popular Polish Town Fair is held annually.

== Geography ==
Riverhead is bounded by Long Island Sound to the north, Southold to the east, Southampton to the southeast, and Brookhaven to the southwest and west.

According to the United States Census Bureau, the town has a total area of 201.3 square miles (521 km^{2}), of which 67.4 square miles (175 km^{2}) is land and 133.9 square miles (347 km^{2}) (66.53%) is water.

The town is partly on the North Fork of the county. The eastern terminus of the Long Island Expressway is in Calverton, within the Town of Riverhead.

=== Climate ===
Long Island has one of the northernmost humid subtropical climates (Köppen Cfa) in the United States. The National Weather Service numbers are from the Research Farm near Long Island Sound.

Climate data for Riverhead Research Farm, New York (1991–2020 normals, extremes 1938–present)
| Month | Jan | Feb | Mar | Apr | May | Jun | Jul | Aug | Sep | Oct | Nov | Dec | Year |
|---|---|---|---|---|---|---|---|---|---|---|---|---|---|
| Record high °F (°C) | 68 (20) | 68 (20) | 83 (28) | 92 (33) | 96 (36) | 98 (37) | 100 (38) | 99 (37) | 98 (37) | 91 (33) | 80 (27) | 76 (24) | 100 (38) |
| Mean daily maximum °F (°C) | 39.7 (4.3) | 41.3 (5.2) | 48.3 (9.1) | 59.8 (15.4) | 70.2 (21.2) | 78.6 (25.9) | 83.9 (28.8) | 82.3 (27.9) | 75.7 (24.3) | 64.9 (18.3) | 54.0 (12.2) | 44.9 (7.2) | 62.0 (16.7) |
| Daily mean °F (°C) | 32.9 (0.5) | 34.1 (1.2) | 40.5 (4.7) | 50.7 (10.4) | 60.6 (15.9) | 69.6 (20.9) | 75.4 (24.1) | 74.2 (23.4) | 68.0 (20.0) | 57.2 (14.0) | 47.0 (8.3) | 38.4 (3.6) | 54.0 (12.2) |
| Mean daily minimum °F (°C) | 26.0 (−3.3) | 26.9 (−2.8) | 32.7 (0.4) | 41.5 (5.3) | 51.0 (10.6) | 60.6 (15.9) | 66.9 (19.4) | 66.1 (18.9) | 60.2 (15.7) | 49.5 (9.7) | 40.0 (4.4) | 31.9 (−0.1) | 46.1 (7.8) |
| Record low °F (°C) | −8 (−22) | −6 (−21) | 8 (−13) | 18 (−8) | 31 (−1) | 39 (4) | 47 (8) | 45 (7) | 34 (1) | 24 (−4) | 17 (−8) | −2 (−19) | −8 (−22) |
| Average precipitation inches (mm) | 3.79 (96) | 3.31 (84) | 4.72 (120) | 4.08 (104) | 3.60 (91) | 3.82 (97) | 3.05 (77) | 3.93 (100) | 4.07 (103) | 4.46 (113) | 3.81 (97) | 4.58 (116) | 47.22 (1,199) |
| Average precipitation days (≥ 0.01 in) | 10.2 | 8.4 | 9.7 | 10.6 | 11.0 | 9.0 | 8.2 | 8.1 | 8.0 | 8.8 | 8.6 | 10.7 | 111.3 |
Source: NOAA

== Demographics ==
Historical population
| Census | Pop. | Note | %± |
|---|---|---|---|
| 1800 | 1,498 | | — |
| 1810 | 1,711 | | 14.2% |
| 1820 | 1,857 | | 8.5% |
| 1830 | 2,016 | | 8.6% |
| 1840 | 2,449 | | 21.5% |
| 1850 | 2,540 | | 3.7% |
| 1860 | 3,044 | | 19.8% |
| 1870 | 3,461 | | 13.7% |
| 1880 | 3,939 | | 13.8% |
| 1890 | 4,010 | | 1.8% |
| 1900 | 4,503 | | 12.3% |
| 1910 | 5,345 | | 18.7% |
| 1920 | 5,753 | | 7.6% |
| 1930 | 7,956 | | 38.3% |
| 1940 | 8,922 | | 12.1% |
| 1950 | 9,973 | | 11.8% |
| 1960 | 14,519 | | 45.6% |
| 1970 | 18,909 | | 30.2% |
| 1980 | 20,243 | | 7.1% |
| 1990 | 23,011 | | 13.7% |
| 2000 | 27,680 | | 20.3% |
| 2010 | 33,506 | | 21.0% |
| 2020 | 35,902 | | 7.2% |
U.S. Decennial Census

=== 2010 census ===
As of the census of 2010, there were 13,506 people and 15,424 households residing in the town. The population density was 497.1 inhabitants per square mile (191.9/km^{2}).

In the town, the population was spread out, with 20.4% under the age of 18, 2.2% from 18 to 20, 6.1% from 20 to 24, 10.5% from 25 to 34, 20.6% from 35 to 49, 21.8% from 49 to 64, and 19.4% who were 65 years of age or older. For every 100 females, there were 99.0 males.

=== Census 2000 ===
As of the census of 2000, There were 10,749 households, out of which 28.1% had children under the age of 18 living with them, 54.0% were married couples living together, 10.3% had a female householder with no husband present, and 32.2% were non-families. 26.4% of all households were made up of individuals, and 14.1% had someone living alone who was 65 years of age or older. The average household size was 2.50 and the average family size was 3.01.

The median income for a household in the town was $52,195, and the median income for a family was $60,939. Males had a median income of $40,855 versus $32,288 for females. The per capita income for the town was $24,647. About 15.8% of families and 17.9% of the population were below the poverty line, including 20.7% of those under age 18 and 7.4% of those age 65 or over.

== Government ==
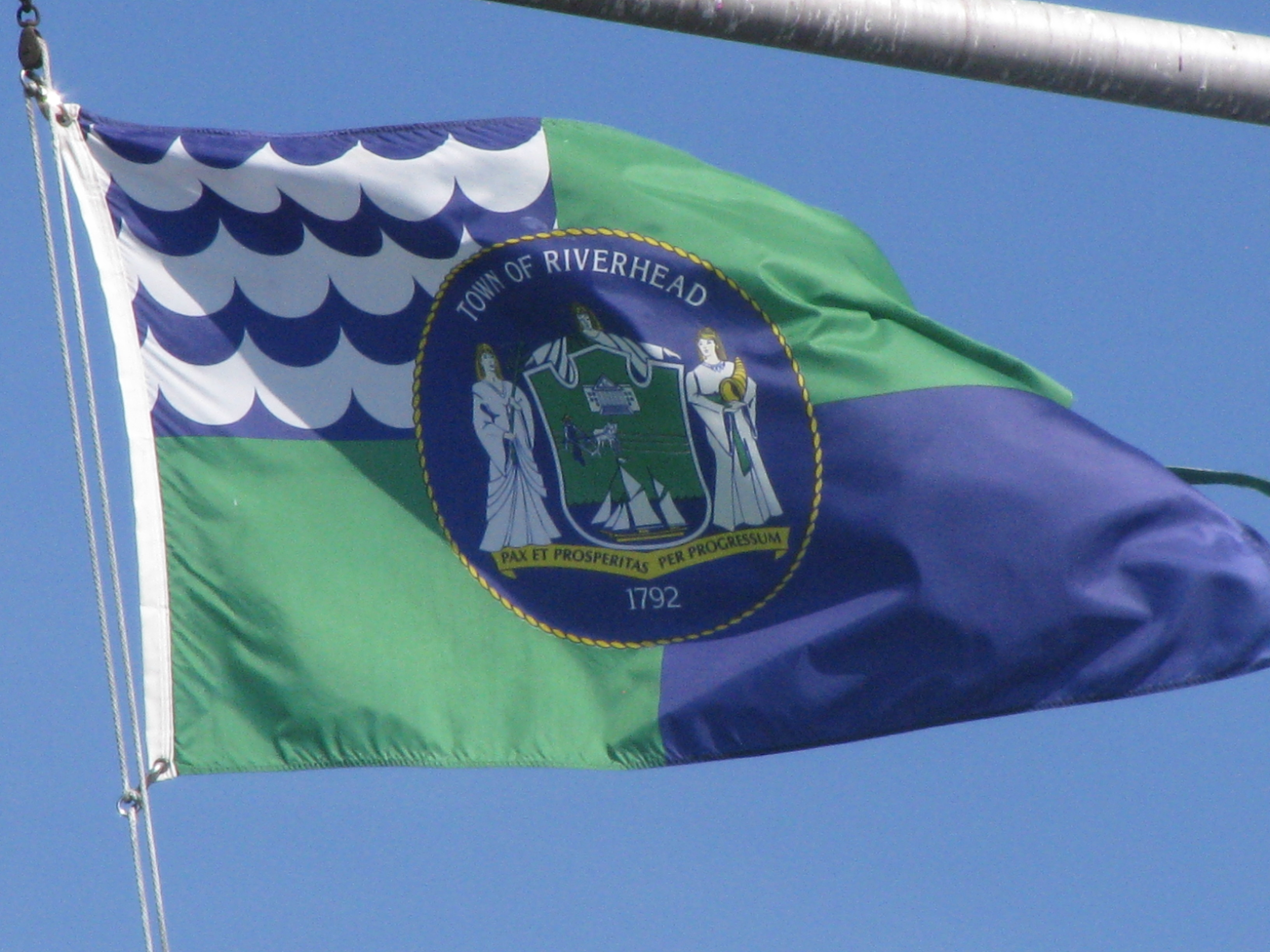
Flag of the Town of Riverhead flying at Grumman Memorial Park

Riverhead has a town council form of government, with the governing body being the Riverhead Town Council. There is an elected Town Supervisor who is elected by the entire town, and four "at large" Town Council seats. The Town Supervisor term is for two years and four years for council seats.

From 1956 to 1975, the Town Council consisted of the Town Supervisor, two Town Council members and two Justices of the Peace. Prior to 1956, the Town Council consisted of the Town Supervisor and four Justices of the Peace. As of 2016, there is a 12-year term limit for Town Council members and the Town Supervisor. The Town Supervisor term of office is for two years. Members of the board cannot serve 12 consecutive years. That means that they could take a break after serving their 12 years and then run for office once again.

== Media ==
The Riverhead newspaper Riverhead News-Review, dates back to 1950, when the Harry Lee Publishing Co. Inc, publishers of The County Review (1903–1950), purchased The Riverhead News (1868–1950) and consolidated the two newspapers as The News-Review. Times/Review Newspapers Corp. purchased The News-Review and The Suffolk Times, based in Greenport, in 1977.

The news website RiverheadLOCAL began publication in 2010. It is owned by East End Local Media Corp., an independent company based in Riverhead.

== Communities and locations ==
=== Hamlets (unincorporated) ===
- Aquebogue
- Baiting Hollow
- Calverton (small part in the Town of Brookhaven)
- Jamesport
- Laurel (mostly in the Town of Southold)
- Manorville (mostly in Brookhaven)
- Northville
- Riverhead (hamlet)
- Wading River (small part in Brookhaven)

=== Other communities ===
- Centerville
- Polishtown
- Reeves Park
- Roanoke
- South Jamesport
- Sweyze

=== State parks ===
- Hallock State Park Preserve
- Wildwood State Park
- Indian Island County Park

== Transportation ==
=== Roads ===
- Interstate 495 – New York City
- New York State Route 25A – Stony Brook University
- New York State Route 25 – New York City, Orient Point
- County Route 58 (Suffolk County, New York)
- County Route 105 (Suffolk County, New York)
- Sound Avenue

=== Rail ===
The Main Line of the Long Island Rail Road is the sole rail line within the Town of Riverhead. The only active station within the town is Riverhead, which is also used as the western terminus of the Railroad Museum of Long Island.

=== Bus ===
The Town of Riverhead is served primarily by Suffolk County Transit and Hampton Jitney bus routes.

=== Airports ===
The town of Riverhead contains a minor private-use airport, known as the Calverton Executive Airpark; it was originally the Naval Weapons Industrial Reserve Plant, Calverton.

== Notable people ==
- Francis Brill (1836–1913), farmer and member of the New York State Assembly
- Danny Burawa (born 1988), major league baseball pitcher.
- Joseph McCrum Belford (August 5, 1852 - May 3, 1917) - Born in Mifflintown, Pennsylvania. Republican member of the United States House of Representatives from New York- 1st. District, 1897 - 1899
- Ed Danowski (September 30, 1911 - February 1, 1997) - Quarterback and Halfback in the NFL, Played for the New York Giants, 1934-1938, 1941. Quarterbacked Giants when they won the 1934 & 1938 NFL Championship Games.
- Gen. Edmund Fanning (April 24, 1739 - February 28, 1818) - Loyalist and Lieutenant-Governor of Nova Scotia, 1783-1786
- Garfield M. Langhorn (September 10, 1948 - January 15, 1969) - Medal of Honor recipient for his actions in the Vietnam War.
- John S. Marcy (March 23, 1830 - May 3, 1885) - member of the New York State Assembly, 1872-1873
- Scott Merserau (April 8, 1965) - Defensive end with the New York Jets, 1987-1993.
- Otis Grey Pike (August 31, 1921 - January 20, 2014) - Democratic member of the United States House of Representatives from New York - 1st. District, 1961 - 1979
- Anne C. Richard (born 1960) - Assistant Secretary of State for Population, Refugees, and Migration, 2012-2017.
- Kate C. Woodhull (1842–1926) and Hannah C. Woodhull - American missionaries in Fuzhou, China, 1884–1912
- Alexander M. Zaleski (June 24, 1906 - May 16, 1975) - Roman Catholic Bishop of Lansing, 1965-1975.
- Michael P. Forbes (born 1952), former member of the United States House of Representatives from New York's 1st congressional district.
- Rashad Robinson (born 1978), civil rights leader and former president of Color of Change.
- Marshall G. Jones (born 1941), mechanical engineer and inventor, inducted into the National Inventors Hall of Fame for his work on industrial lasers.
- John Cleves Symmes (1742–1814), judge, Revolutionary War veteran, and delegate to the Congress of the Confederation.

== See also ==
- List of towns in New York
- National Register of Historic Places listings in Riverhead (town), New York
