= KFSQ =

Radio station in Thousand Palms, California

- Thousand Palms, California; United States
- Broadcast area: Coachella Valley
- Frequency: 1270 kHz
- Branding: Fox Sports 1270AM Palm Springs

Programming
- Language: English
- Format: Sports radio

Ownership
- Owner: Bradley Fuhr; (KGAY PSP)
- Operator: Arrington Broadcasting
- Sister stations: KMEE

History
- First air date: 1965
- Former call signs: KGOL (1965–1970); KGUY (1970–1985); KNWZ (1985–1998); KXPS (1998–2001); KCMJ (2001–2004); KNWU (2004); KNWT (2004–2007); KFUT (2007–2013); KFSQ (2013–2016); KVGH (2016–2018); KGAY (2018–2025)
- Call sign meaning: "Fox Sports"

Technical information
- Licensing authority: FCC
- Facility ID: 14056
- Class: B
- Power: 5,000 watts (day); 750 watts (night)
- Transmitter coordinates: 33°51′4.1″N 116°23′39″W

Links
- Public license information: Public file; LMS
- Website: foxsportspalmsprings.com

KFSQ (1270 AM, "Fox Sports 1270 AM Palm Springs") is a radio station licensed to Thousand Palms, California. Operated by KGAY PSP and operated by Arrington Broadcasting, it broadcasts a sports radio format as part of the Fox Sports Radio network.

== History ==
On December 18, 2013, the then-KFUT changed their format from Spanish oldies to sports, branded as "Fox Sports 1270" in reflection of its Fox Sports Radio affiliation. The station changed to the call sign KFSQ on December 19, 2013, and then to KVGH on February 23, 2016. From April 2016 to January 31, 2017, KVGH was simulcasting a classic hits format with its sister station KVGH-FM (105.1). In November 2016, KVGH rebranded as "Valley 106.5", using the frequency of FM translator K293CL 106.5 FM Thousand Palms.

On December 26, 2018, KVGH changed its format from classic hits to LGBT oriented programming, under the new call sign KGAY. It was owned by Sunnylands Broadcasting LLC, and operated under an LMA agreement with QChella Media, a non-profit formed to serve the LGBTQ community.

The non-profit was dissolved in 2020, and Sunnylands took over operation until the sale to KGAY PSP on December 31, 2021.

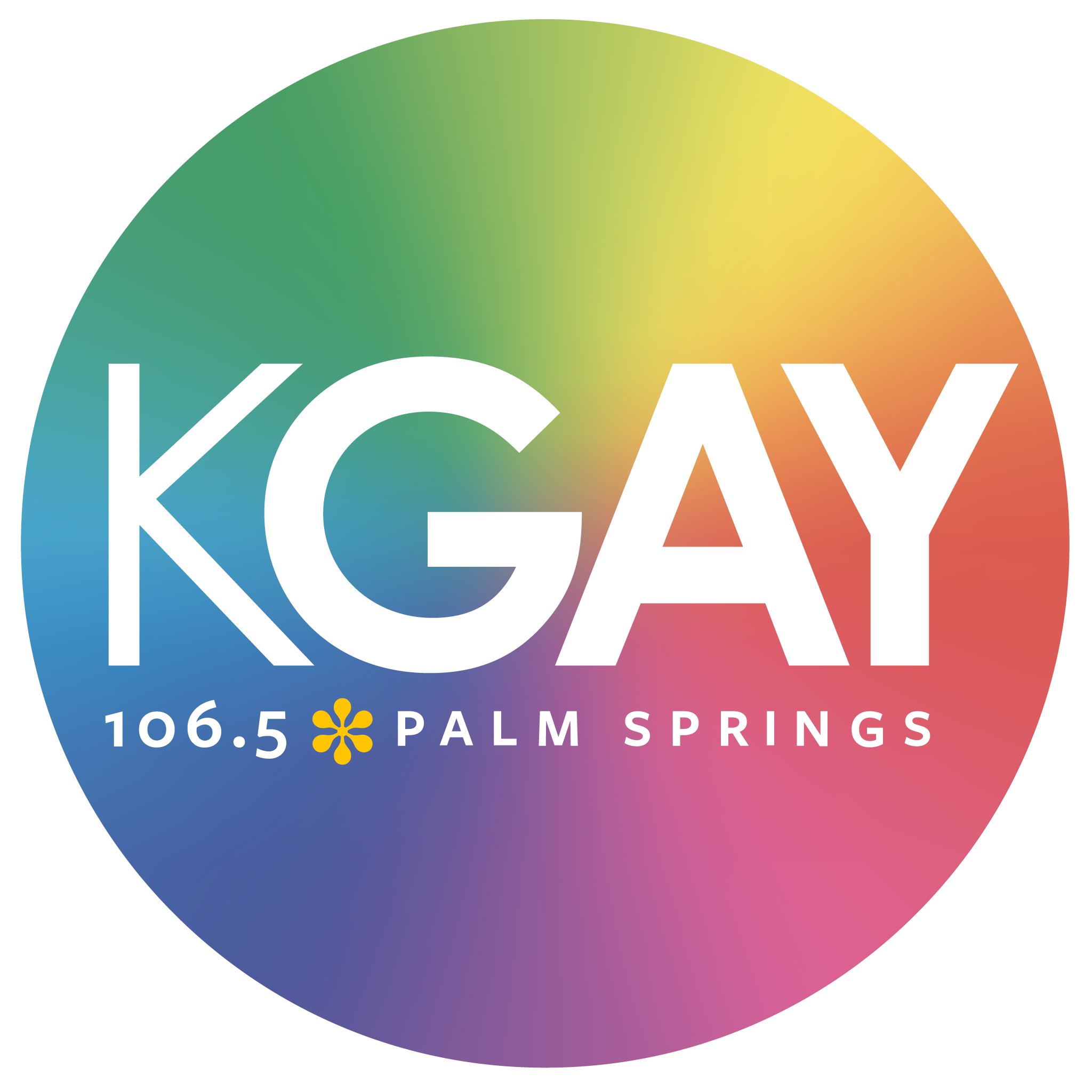
Former logo

On March 4, 2024, KGAY began simulcasting on 92.1 KKCM in Thermal.

In April 2025, the station was taken over by Arrington Broadcasting under a local marketing agreement, after which it returned to Fox Sports Radio as KFSQ. The agreement includes an option for the company to acquire the station outright within 60 months. Concurrently, KGAY moved its originating signal to KMEE-HD2, while maintaining the 92.1 simulcast.
