= Calverton, New York =

- Hamlet and census-designated place
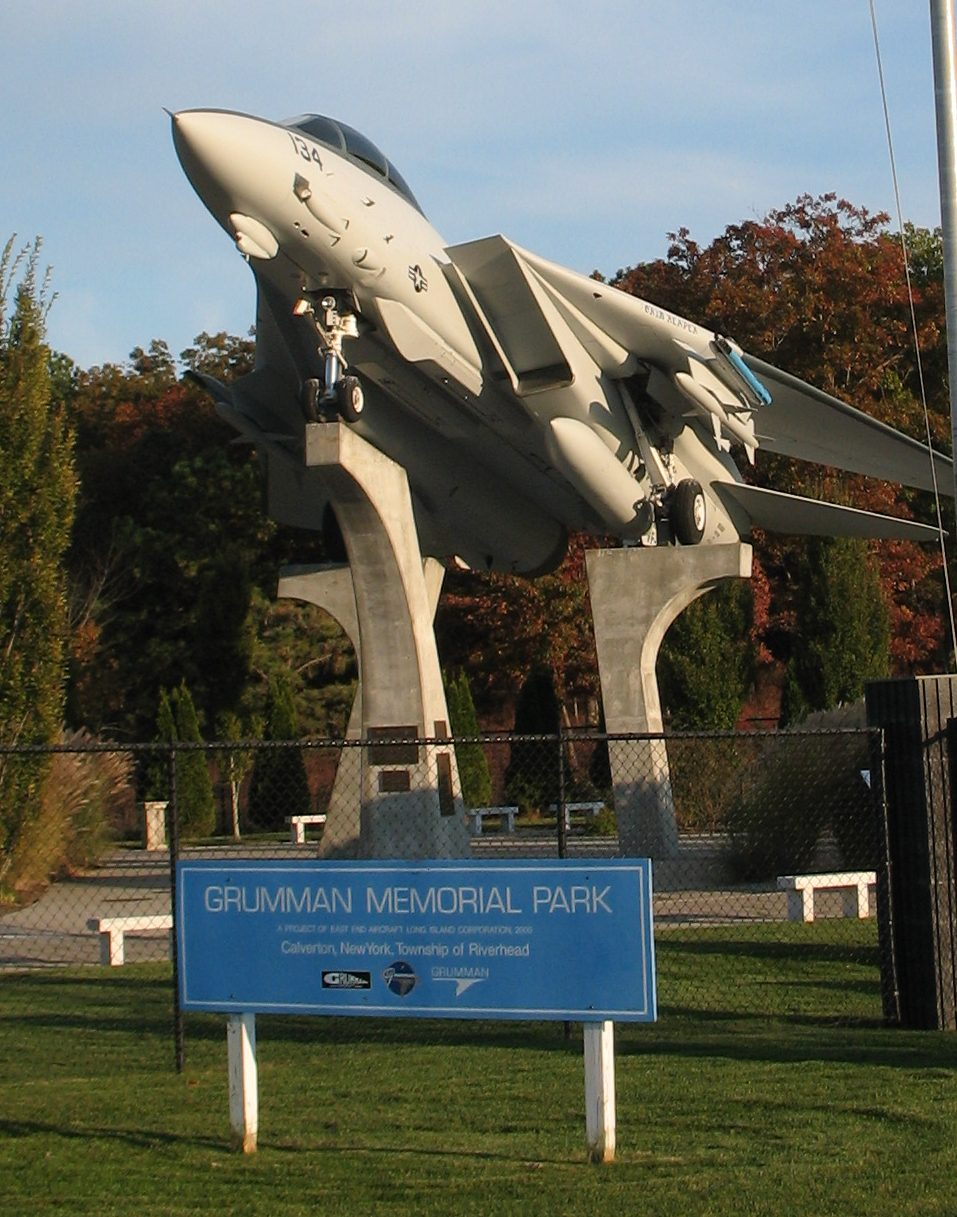
- Grumman Memorial Park

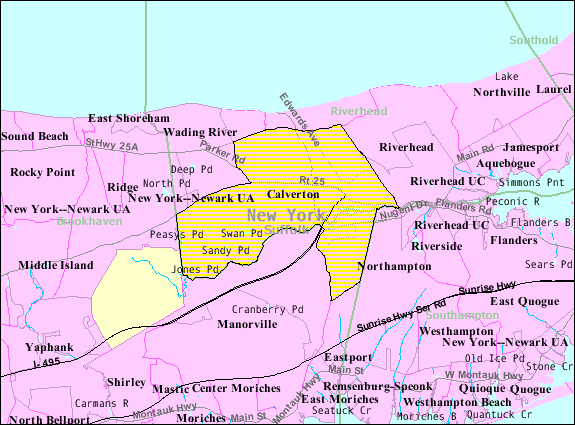
- U.S. Census map of Calverton.

- Location within the state of New York. Calverton, New York (New York) Calverton, New York (the United States)
- Coordinates: 40°55′14″N 72°44′11″W
- Country: United States
- State: New York
- County: Suffolk
- Town: Brookhaven; Riverhead

Area
  - Total: 26.71 sq mi (69.19 km^{2})
  - Land: 26.22 sq mi (67.90 km^{2})
  - Water: 0.50 sq mi (1.29 km^{2})
- Elevation: 30 ft (9 m)

Population (2020)
  - Total: 5,934
  - Density: 226/sq mi (87.4/km^{2})
- Time zone: UTC−05:00 (Eastern Time Zone)
  - Summer (DST): UTC−04:00
- ZIP Code: 11933
- Area codes: 631, 934
- FIPS code: 36-11781
- GNIS feature ID: 0945505

Calverton is a hamlet and census-designated place (CDP) on eastern Long Island in Suffolk County, New York, United States. As of the 2020 census, Calverton had a population of 5,934.

Most of Calverton is in the Town of Riverhead, while the area south of the Peconic River is a mostly undeveloped smaller portion in the Town of Brookhaven.

== History ==
Calverton was first referred to as "Baiting Hollow Station" when the Long Island Rail Road arrived in 1844. The station closed in 1958, but the sheltered shed for the station remained standing as of 2007.

The area's Native American name was Conungum or Kanungum, meaning "fixed line" or "boundary". In 1868, the Calverton post office opened, named for Bernard J. Calvert. It remained a small farming community specializing in cranberries, which grew in swampy areas along the Peconic River until the Navy purchase.

Calverton's history is tied closely to Naval Weapons Industrial Reserve Plant, Calverton. In 1953, the United States Navy purchased 6,000 acres (24 km^{2}) around Calverton from a local farmer named Harry Edwards, including the mansion of a grandson of Frank Winfield Woolworth's, so that Grumman could test and finish jets. A 10,000-foot (3,000 m) runway was built, and most of Grumman's F-14 Tomcat and E-2C Hawkeye aircraft were to pass through the plant.

In 1965, Nelson Rockefeller proposed using the base as the fourth major airport for the New York metropolitan area. Grumman and local opposition ended the quest.

In 1978, more than 1,000 acres (4.0 km^{2}) of the base were used to create Calverton National Cemetery, which is the largest and busiest (in terms of burials per day) United States national cemetery. In 1995, after Northrop acquired Grumman, the new Northrop Grumman pulled out of the base, and the Navy began liquidating the land. In 1996, before the base could be turned over the Town of Riverhead, the base was used to reassemble the wreckage of TWA Flight 800 which had crashed about 20 miles (32 km) south in the ocean. In 2000, Skydive Long Island (formerly located at East Moriches) moved to the airport. As of 2024, Sky Dive Long Island moved operations to Shirley, NY and continues to generate the majority of the current air traffic as a key destination for New York–based skydivers.

Through 2007, debates raged about whether or not to turn the base into a mega complex around a NASCAR track, called EPCAL Centre, or a giant ski resort based construction of an artificial 350-foot (110 m) high indoor ski mountain. In January 2008, the Riverhead Town Board, with newly elected officers, signed a deal to sell the airport for $155 million to Riverhead Resorts, to build the ski mountain, tear up the airport runway, and replace it with a lake, overruling a December vote to give the NASCAR track the go-ahead. It would have taken up to three years to get the necessary environmental permits, and the proposed opening date of the project was 2012. On November 12, 2010, however, the town of Riverhead voted 4–1 to cancel all plans for the indoor ski resort/water park.

A portion of the base is being developed as an industrial/office park.

Several new medium size industrial companies have sprung up in the area, including Crown Recycling and a Federal Express Distribution Center.

== Geography ==
According to the United States Census Bureau, the CDP has a total area of 28.5 square miles (74 km^{2}), of which 28.0 square miles (73 km^{2}) is land and 0.5 square miles (1.3 km^{2}), or 1.82%, is water.

The former Naval Weapons Industrial Reserve Plant became the Naval Weapons Industrial Reserve Plant, Calverton (IATA code "CTO") in the late 20th century.

== Demographics ==
Historical population
Census	Pop.	Note	%±
2020	5,934		—
U.S. Decennial Census

=== 2020 census ===
As of the 2020 census, Calverton had a population of 5,934. The median age was 54.5 years. 16.0% of residents were under the age of 18 and 34.0% of residents were 65 years of age or older. For every 100 females there were 90.7 males, and for every 100 females age 18 and over there were 85.6 males age 18 and over.

71.8% of residents lived in urban areas, while 28.2% lived in rural areas.

There were 2,779 households in Calverton, of which 18.4% had children under the age of 18 living in them. Of all households, 39.1% were married-couple households, 19.0% were households with a male householder and no spouse or partner present, and 36.2% were households with a female householder and no spouse or partner present. About 40.4% of all households were made up of individuals and 27.6% had someone living alone who was 65 years of age or older.

There were 3,016 housing units, of which 7.9% were vacant. The homeowner vacancy rate was 2.1% and the rental vacancy rate was 5.8%.

Racial composition as of the 2020 census
Race	Number	Percent
White	4,351	73.3%
Black or African American	431	7.3%
American Indian and Alaska Native	39	0.7%
Asian	49	0.8%
Native Hawaiian and Other Pacific Islander	0	0.0%
Some other race	541	9.1%
Two or more races	523	8.8%
Hispanic or Latino (of any race)	1,095	18.5%

=== 2000 census ===
As of the 2000 census, there were 5,704 people, 2,539 households, and 1,518 families residing in the CDP. The population density was 203.7 inhabitants per square mile (78.6/km^{2}). There were 2,735 housing units at an average density of 97.7 per square mile (37.7/km^{2}). The racial makeup of the CDP was 86.61% White, 7.66% African American, 0.46% Native American, 0.95% Asian, 0.04% Pacific Islander, 2.03% from other races, and 2.26% from two or more races. Hispanic or Latino of any race were 6.07% of the population.

There were 2,539 households, out of which 22.3% had children under the age of 18 living with them, 46.1% were married couples living together, 10.1% had a female householder with no husband present, and 40.2% were non-families. 34.7% of all households were made up of individuals, and 19.9% had someone living alone who was 65 years of age or older. The average household size was 2.24 and the average family size was 2.88.

In the CDP, the population was spread out, with 20.3% under the age of 18, 5.6% from 18 to 24, 27.5% from 25 to 44, 20.9% from 45 to 64, and 25.6% who were 65 years of age or older. The median age was 43 years. For every 100 females, there were 93.0 males. For every 100 females age 18 and over, there were 88.0 males.

The median income for a household in the CDP was $36,544, and the median income for a family was $44,342. Males had a median income of $40,184 versus $33,047 for females. The per capita income for the CDP was $26,609. About 6.5% of families and 10.2% of the population were below the poverty threshold, including 13.1% of those under age 18 and 6.6% of those age 65 or over.

== Economy ==
Splish Splash Water Park is located within the hamlet.

== Media ==
- WPTY is licensed to serve Calverton

== See also ==
- Calverton National Cemetery
