= St Albans Abbey railway station =

Railway station in Hertfordshire, England

St Albans Abbey
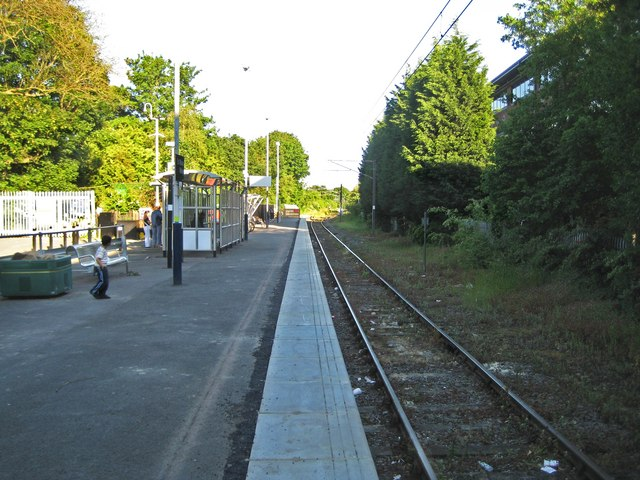

General information
- Location: St Albans, St Albans; England
- Coordinates: 51.7447°N 0.3426°W
- Grid reference: TL145063
- Managed by: London Northwestern Railway
- Platforms: 1

Other information
- Station code: SAA
- Classification: DfT category F1

History
- Original company: London and North Western Railway
- Post-grouping: LMS

Key dates
- 5 May 1858: Opened as St Albans
- 2 June 1924: Renamed as St Albans Abbey

Passengers
- 2020/21: ▼21,866
- 2021/22: ▲58,328
- 2022/23: ▲0.111 million
- 2023/24: ▲0.118 million
- 2024/25: ▲0.149 million
Location
Notes
- Passenger statistics from the Office of Rail and Road

St Albans Abbey is one of two railway stations in St Albans, Hertfordshire, England; the other being the busier, much larger and a decade younger St Albans City. It is located about 0.6 miles (1 km) south of the city centre, in the St Stephen's area. It is the terminus of the Abbey Line from Watford Junction, with services operated by London Northwestern Railway.

The unstaffed station consists of a single open-air platform and a car park. Improvement works were carried out in 2008. It was the second UK railway station to receive a Harrington Hump to improve accessibility.

== History ==
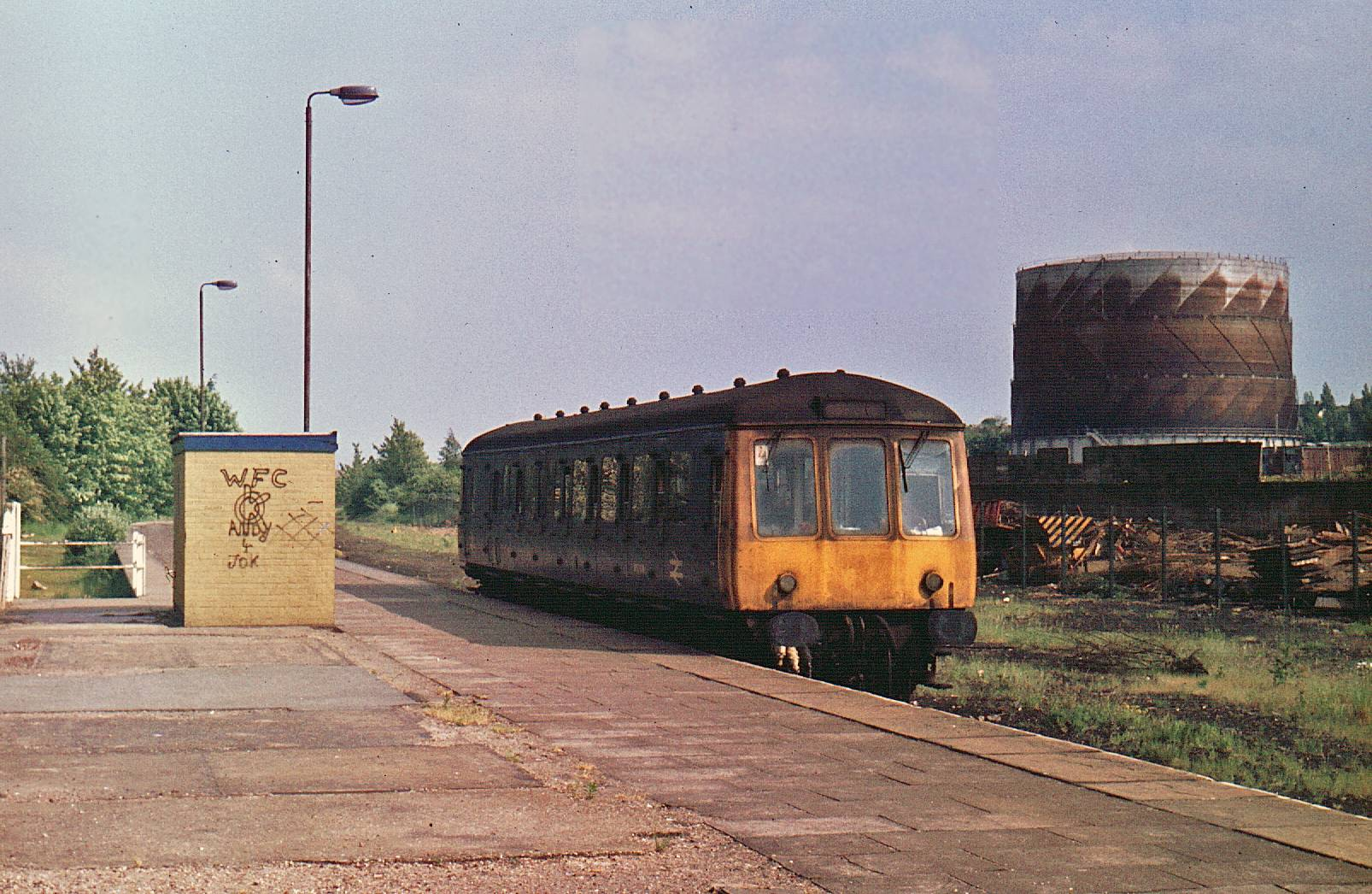
St Albans Abbey station in June 1977

St Albans Abbey was the first railway station in St Albans, built by the London and North Western Railway in 1858. It was, as it is now, a terminus; the company's plans to extend northwards to Luton and Dunstable never materialised. Although the Midland Railway opened their station (St Albans City) in 1868, it was not until 1924 that "Abbey" was added to the station's title to avoid confusion – by this stage, both stations were owned by the London, Midland and Scottish Railway.

Until November 2007 responsibility for the branch line was with Silverlink.

Restoration of the passing loop at Bricket Wood was being considered by the local authorities and Network Rail but was turned down in early 2008; this would have facilitated trains running every 30 minutes. The passing loop proposal was being reconsidered in 2020 as part of the UK government’s £500-million 'Restoring Your Railway Fund' to re-open some of the lines and stations that were closed in the 1960s.

=== Branch to Hatfield ===
In 1865, the Great Northern Railway supported a group of local landowners to open a branch line from Hatfield to St Albans Abbey with an intermediate stop at St Albans London Road, and later at Smallford (1866), Salvation Army Halt (1897), Hill End (1899), Nast Hyde Halt (1910) and Lemsford Road Halt (1942). This line closed to passengers in 1951. Goods services were withdrawn from the end of 1968 and the track was lifted. In the mid-1980s, the route was opened as a cycle path, now the Alban Way. The remains of the branch can be seen to the left of the single platform when looking down the line in the direction of Watford Junction, including overgrown remnants of the second platform which served the branch.

== Station masters ==
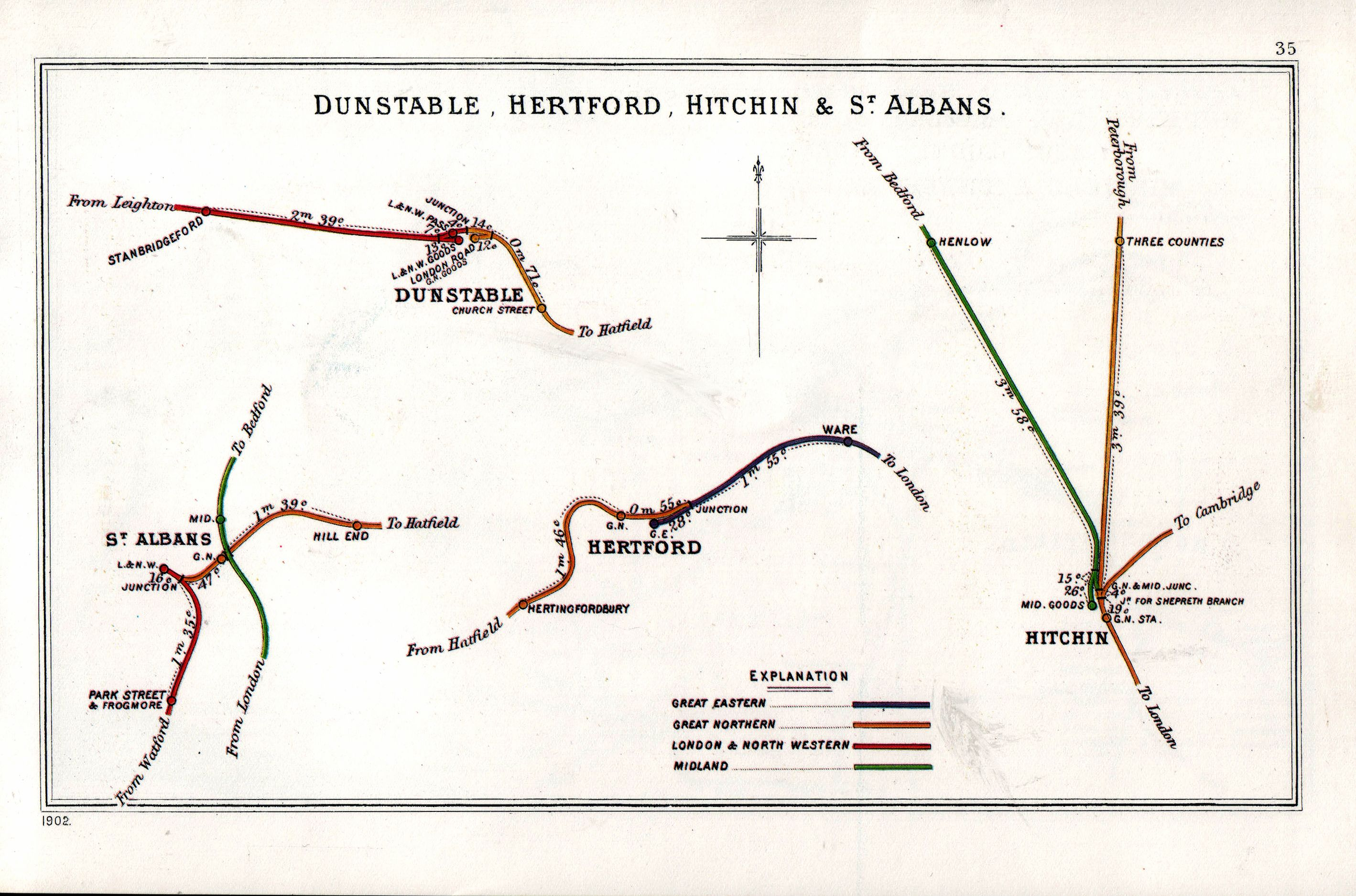
A 1902 Railway Clearing House map of railways in the vicinity of St Albans Abbey (lower left, shown here in red as L.&N.W.)

- Frederick Facer 1858 – 1866
- R. Butler 1866 - 1867
- Edward Orchard 1867 – 1875 (afterwards station master at Kings Langley)
- Andrew Dunleary 1875 – ???? (formerly station master at King’s Langley)
- Mr. Welton ???? – 1890 (afterwards station master at Aylesbury)
- F. Butcher 1890 – 1893 (afterwards station master at Atherstone)
- W.B. Holder 1893 – 1895 (afterwards station master at Newport Pagnall)
- Mr. Smerdon 1895 – 1896 (formerly station master at Stanmore)
- William Telfer 1896 – 1905 (afterwards station master at Buxton)
- Henry Orchard 1905 – 1912 (afterwards station master at Harrow Junction)

== Accidents and incidents ==
- On 10 February 1988, a diesel multiple unit overran the buffer stop. There were no injuries amongst the seventeen passengers on board.

== Services ==
All services at St Albans Abbey are operated by London Northwestern Railway using Class 350 EMUs.

The typical off-peak service on all days of the week is one train per hour to and from Watford Junction, increasing to a train approximately every 45 minutes in each direction during the peak hours.

Preceding station	National Rail	Following station
Park Street towards Watford Junction	London Northwestern Railway Abbey Line	Terminus
Disused railways
Terminus	Great Northern Railway Hatfield and St Albans Railway	St Albans (London Road) Line and station closed

== Sources ==
- Butt, R. V. J. (October 1995). The Directory of Railway Stations: details every public and private passenger station, halt, platform and stopping place, past and present (1st ed.). Sparkford: Patrick Stephens Ltd. ISBN 978-1-85260-508-7. OCLC 60251199. OL 11956311M.
- Jowett, Alan (March 1989). Jowett's Railway Atlas of Great Britain and Ireland: From Pre-Grouping to the Present Day (1st ed.). Sparkford: Patrick Stephens Ltd. ISBN 978-1-85260-086-0. OCLC 22311137.
- Abbeyline.org.uk
- The Alban Way
