= Hill End Hospital =

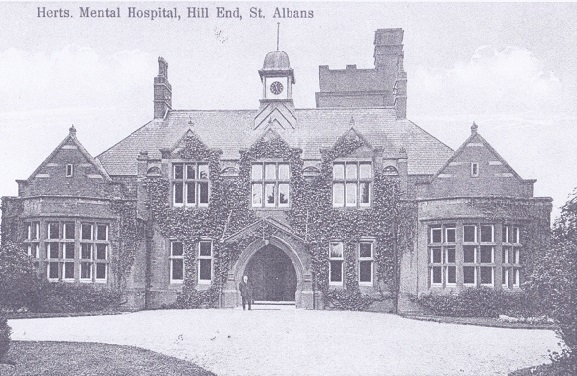
- Hill End Hospital

- Shown in Hertfordshire

Geography
- Location: St Albans, Hertfordshire, England
- Coordinates: 51.7490°N 0.3025°W

Organisation
- Care system: NHS
- Type: Specialist

Services
- Emergency department: N/A
- Speciality: Psychiatric Hospital

History
- Founded: 1899
- Closed: 1995

Links
- Lists: Hospitals in England

Hill End Hospital was a mental health facility in St Albans in Hertfordshire, England.

== History ==
The hospital, which was designed by George Thomas Hine using a Compact Arrow layout, opened as the Hertfordshire County Asylum in April 1899. Hill End railway station, a station on the Great Northern Railway branch from Hatfield to St Albans, was opened to service the hospital in August 1899. The asylum became the Hertfordshire County Mental Hospital in 1920 and the Hill End Hospital for Mental and Nervous Diseases in 1936. During the Second World War patients were evacuated from St Bartholomew's Hospital to Hill End Hospital. It became part of the National Health Service as the Hill End Hospital and Clinic for the Prevention and Treatment of Mental and Nervous Disorders in 1948.

After the introduction of Care in the Community in the early 1980s, the hospital went into a period of decline and closed in November 1995. The buildings have since been demolished and the site redeveloped for residential use.
