= Smallford =

Village in Hertfordshire, England

Coordinates: 51.753°N 0.267°W

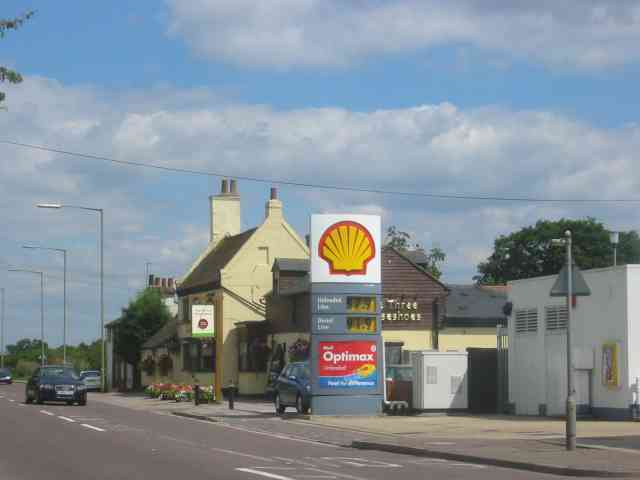
- Smallford - Hatfield Road with petrol station and The Three Horseshoes

- Location within Hertfordshire
- Population: 373
- Civil parish: Colney Heath
- District: City of St Albans
- Shire county: Hertfordshire
- Region: East
- Country: England
- Sovereign state: United Kingdom
- Post town: ST ALBANS
- Postcode district: AL4
- Dialling code: 01727
- Police: Hertfordshire
- Fire: Hertfordshire
- Ambulance: East of England
- UK Parliament: St Albans

Smallford is a village in the City and District of St Albans, Hertfordshire, United Kingdom. It is sandwiched between Hatfield and St Albans. It was served by Smallford railway station on the Hatfield and St Albans Railway, now the Alban Way cycle path. It is in the civil parish of Colney Heath.

The station was closed to passengers in October 1951, and closed completely in January 1969. In November 2012 it was announced that the Smallford Residents’ Association had received £9,900 from the Heritage Lottery Fund for a project named "Bringing the History of Smallford Station to Life", led by volunteers from the local area, and focusing on the history of Smallford Station, the branch line it served, and the impact this had on nearby communities.

An Oaklands College campus is located at Smallford.

Smallford also plays host to St Albans RFC, St Albans' highest placed community club and St Albans' first open Rugby Club.

Motorcycle speedway racing was staged in Smallford during each year 1936 to 1939.

To the south is the village of Sleapshyde.
