= St Albans (London Road) railway station =

Former railway station in England

St Albans London Road
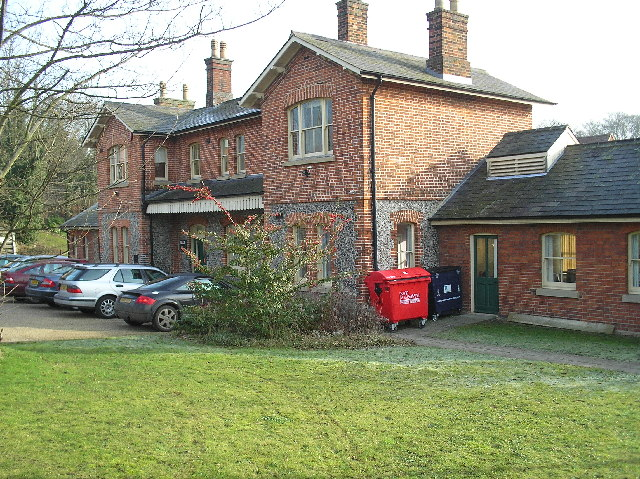

General information
- Location: St Albans, City and District of St Albans, Hertfordshire; England
- Coordinates: 51.745078°N 0.327806°W
- Platforms: 1

Other information
- Status: Disused

History
- Original company: Hatfield and St Albans Railway
- Pre-grouping: Great Northern Railway
- Post-grouping: LNER

Key dates
- 16 October 1865: Station opened
- 1 October 1951: Station closed
Location

St Albans London Road was one of three railway stations in St Albans, Hertfordshire.

== History ==
The station was opened by the Hatfield and St Albans Railway on 16 October 1865, and passenger services ceased on 1 October 1951.

The station building has been restored, and the trackbed now forms part of the Alban Way, a six and a half-mile-long cycle track from St Albans to Hatfield.

The old station building has been listed Grade II on the National Heritage List for England since June 1994.

== Station masters ==
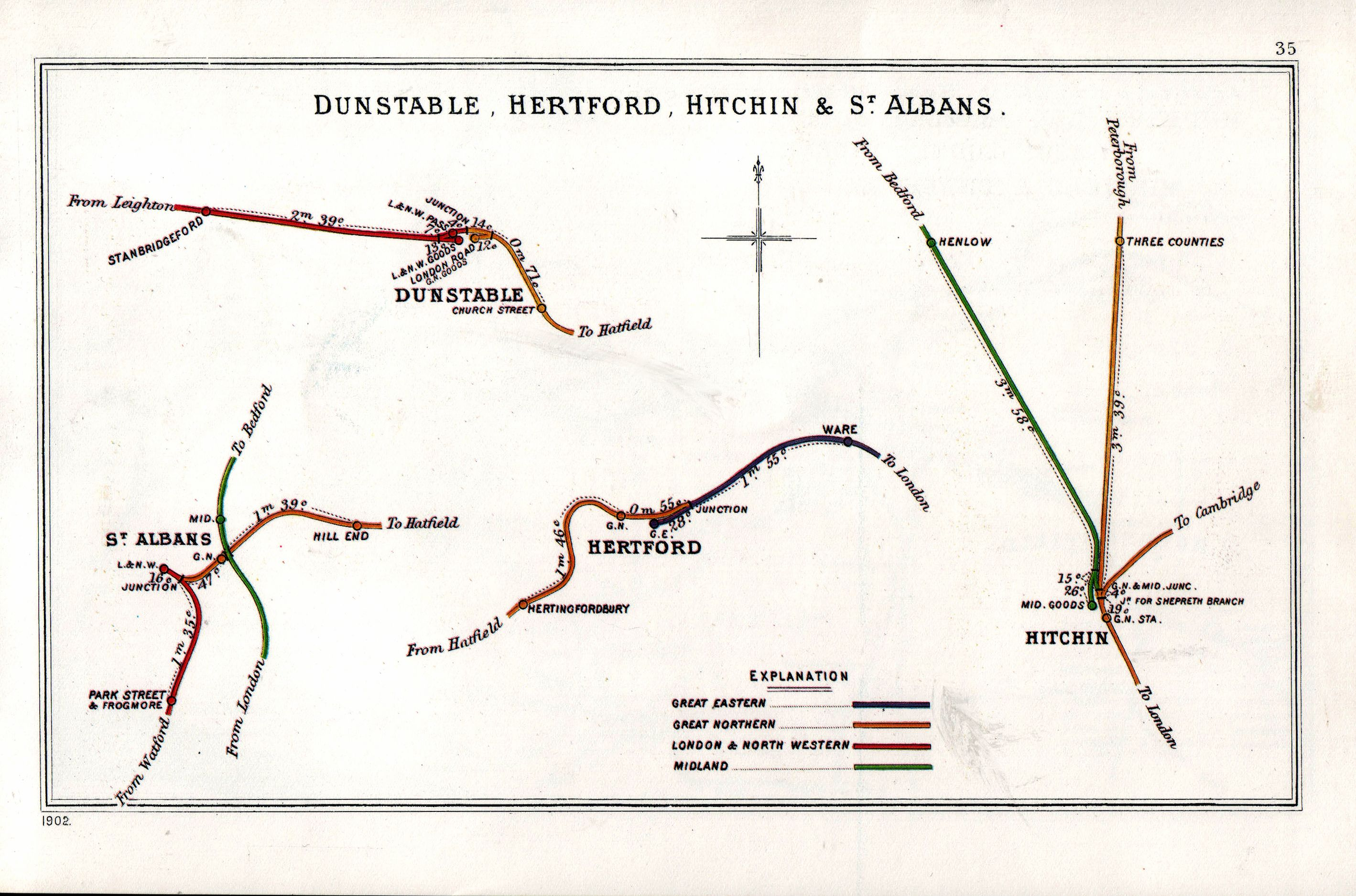
A 1902 Railway Clearing House map of railways in the vicinity of St Albans (London Road) (lower left, shown here in orange as G.N.)

- James Barnes 1865 – 1883
- J. D. Rhodes 1884 – 1888 (formerly station master at Essendine)
- Mr Perkins 1888 – 1890 (formerly station master at Meldreth and Melbourn)
- Jonas Ellingham 1899 – 1918 (murdered by his wife)
- Ernest Wallis 1919 – 1920 (afterwards station master at Palmers Green)
- C. John Whitehead 1920 – 1926
- Campbell George Correll 1926- 1934
- George Howlett 1935 – 1941 (also station master of St Albans City railway station)
- T. Bond 1946 - 1949
- Albert Shaw 1949 - 1951

Preceding station	Disused railways	Following station
St Albans Abbey; Line closed; station open	Great Northern Railway; Hatfield and St Albans Railway	Salvation Army Halt; Line and station closed
