= St Albans City =

St Albans City may refer to:

- St Albans, Hertfordshire, UK
  - City of St Albans, the local government district covering the city and surrounding area
  - St Albans City F.C., a football club in St Albans
  - St Albans City railway station, the city's main station
- St. Albans (city), Vermont, U.S.
