= Hill End railway station =

Former railway station in Hertfordshire, England

Coordinates: 51.7492°N 0.2968°W

Hill End
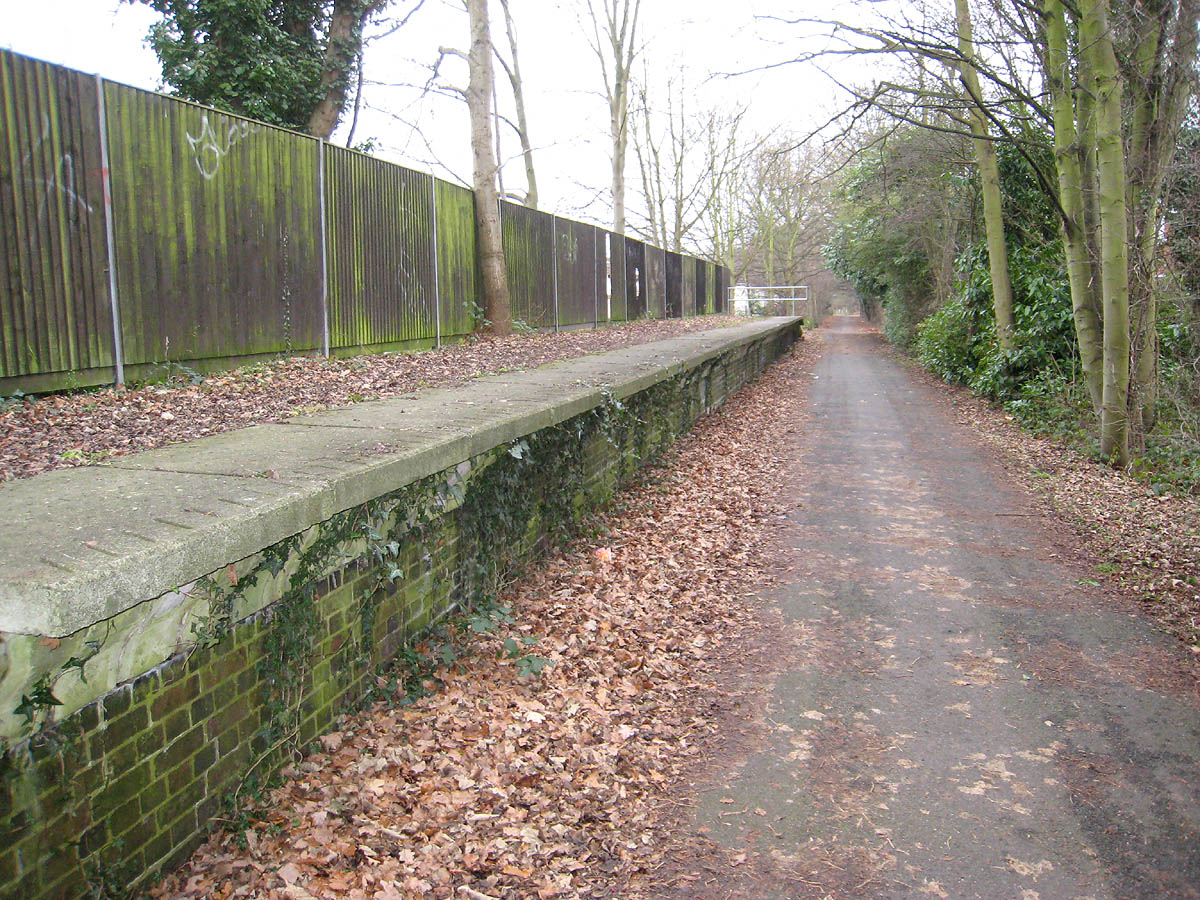
- Platform remains on the Alban Way

General information
- Location: St Albans, City and District of St Albans, Hertfordshire; England
- Platforms: 1

Other information
- Status: Disused

History
- Opened: 1 August 1899
- Closed: 1 October 1951
- Original company: Great Northern Railway
- Pre-grouping: GNR
- Post-grouping: London and North Eastern Railway
Location

Hill End railway station was on the Great Northern Railway branch from Hatfield to St Albans in Hertfordshire, England.

== History ==
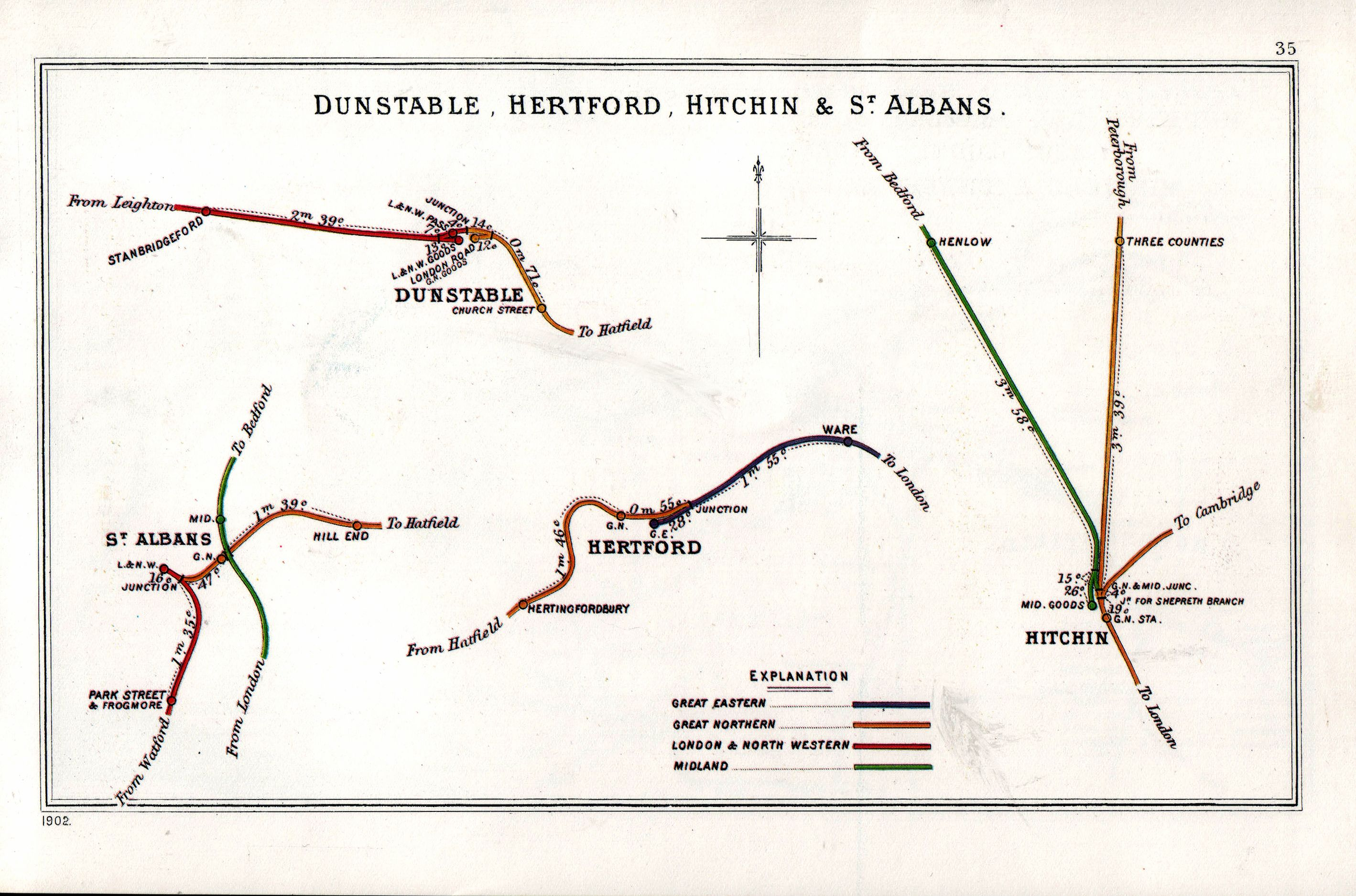
A 1902 Railway Clearing House map of railways in the vicinity of Hill End (lower left)

The station, which was intended to service Hill End Hospital, opened on 1 August 1899, and closed on 1 October 1951.

Preceding station	Disused railways	Following station
Salvation Army Halt	Great Northern Railway; Hatfield and St Albans Railway	Smallford
