= Salvation Army Halt railway station =

Former railway station in England

Coordinates: 51°45′01″N 0°18′59″W

Salvation Army Halt
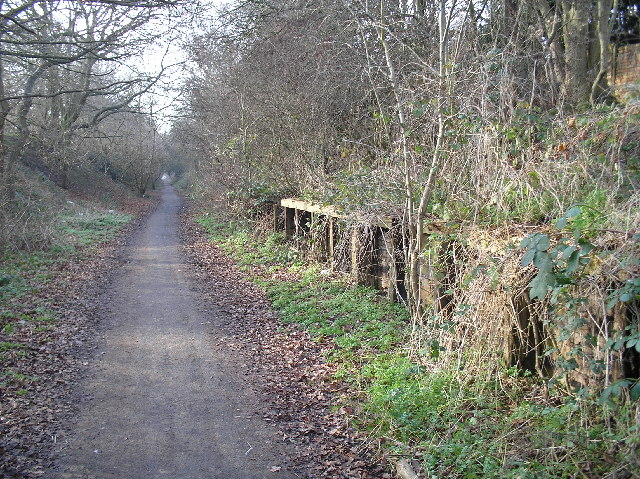
- Platform remains on the Alban Way

General information
- Location: St Albans, City and District of St Albans; England
- Grid reference: TL163071
- Platforms: 1

Other information
- Status: Disused

History
- Opened: 1 November 1897
- Closed: 1 October 1951
- Pre-grouping: GNR
- Post-grouping: LNER; London Midland Region of British Railways
Location

Salvation Army Halt railway station was initially a private non-timetabled halt for the staff of Messrs Sander & Sons which had established an orchid-growing business in the Camp district of St Albans. A private siding (known as "Sander's Sidings") also led directly to the firm's greenhouses, enabling the swift dispatch of orchids to the market. The halt was also used by Salvation Army personnel working at the Army's printing works on Campfield Road, and it was from this that the halt obtained its name. Just after the station, a short branch line departed to the east and served Hertfordshire County Mental Hospital.

| Preceding station | Disused railways | Following station |
|---|---|---|
| St Albans (London Road) | Great Northern Railway; Hatfield and St Albans Railway | Hill End |
