= Sleapshyde =

Village in Hertfordshire, England

Coordinates: 51.748345°N 0.260116°W

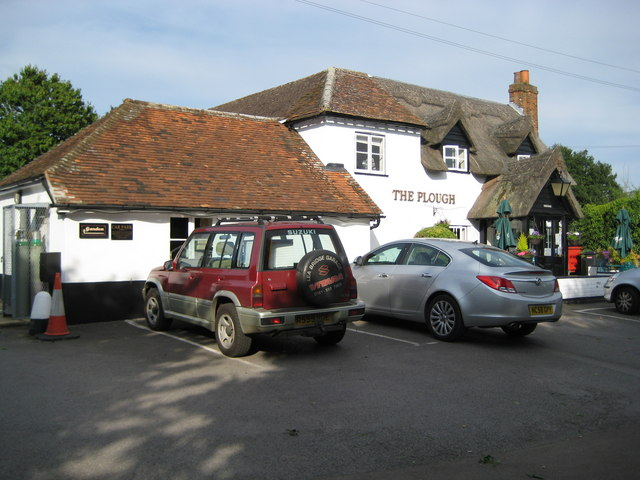
- Sleapshyde - The Plough

- Location within Hertfordshire
- Population: 386
- Civil parish: Colney Heath
- District: St Albans City and District
- Shire county: Hertfordshire
- Region: East
- Country: England
- Sovereign state: United Kingdom
- Post town: ST ALBANS
- Postcode district: AL4
- Dialling code: 01727
- Police: Hertfordshire
- Fire: Hertfordshire
- Ambulance: East of England
- UK Parliament: St Albans

Sleapshyde is a small village in Hertfordshire, United Kingdom. It is located between Hatfield and St Albans, to the south of Smallford and to the north of Colney Heath, of which it is located in the civil parish of. The village has one pub, The Plough, and used to have a Methodist church, now sold and converted to a private house. Sleapshyde has a conservation area that was designated by St Albans District Council on 31 March 1993.

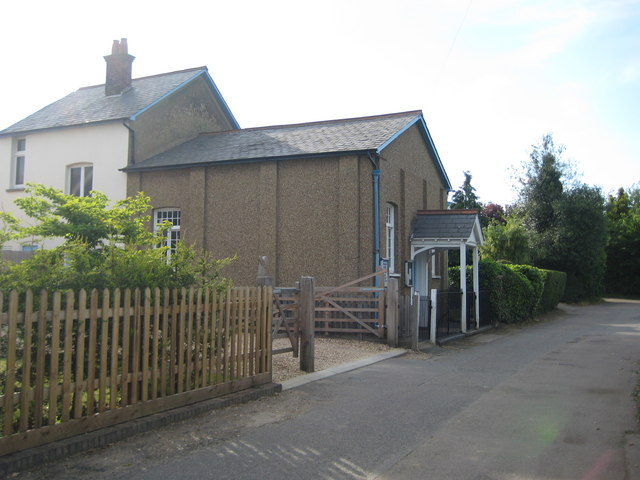
Sleapshyde Methodist Church
