= Smallford railway station =

Former railway station in England

Coordinates: 51.7507°N 0.2660°W

Smallford
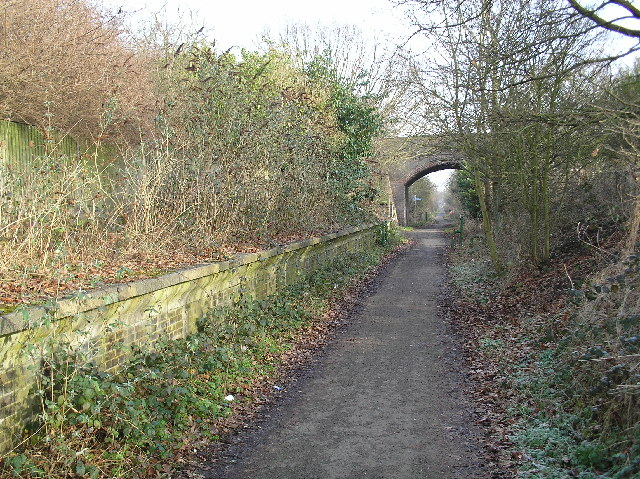
- Platform remains on the Alban Way

General information
- Location: Smallford, City and District of St Albans, Hertfordshire; England
- Grid reference: TL198072
- Platforms: 1

Other information
- Status: Disused

History
- Pre-grouping: Hatfield and St Albans Railway
- Post-grouping: LNER; London Midland Region of British Railways

Key dates
- May 1866: Opened
- 1951: closed for passengers
- 1 January 1969: Closed for freight
Location

Smallford railway station was a station on the former St Albans Branch Line in the UK. The station opened as Springfield in 1866, and was renamed in 1879. The station closed permanently on New Year's Day 1969 when a haulage contract ended with a local scrap merchant, but it had already closed to passengers in 1951. The single platform still exists alongside the Alban Way rail trail, as does the ticket office, located in an adjacent builders' yard. The current Station Yard and Station Road mark the location of the station on what is now the Alban Way.

In November 2012 it was announced that the Smallford Residents’ Association (SRA) had received £9,900 from the Heritage Lottery Fund for a project named "Bringing the History of Smallford Station to Life", led by volunteers from the local area, and focusing on the history of Smallford Station, the branch line it served, and the impact this had on nearby communities. Jeff Lewis, SRA chair, said the association was excited at the thought of finding people who recall the station and branch line when they were operating and capturing their memories for posterity.

A website was set up in February 2013, to provide a location where the complete history of the station can be found www.smallford.org

Preceding station	Disused railways	Following station
Hill End	Great Northern Railway; Hatfield and St Albans Railway	Nast Hyde Halt
