= 1870 Hatfield rail crash =

Railway incident in Hertfordshire, England

Details
- Date: 26 December 1870
- Location: Hatfield, Hertfordshire
- Coordinates: 51.7387°N 0.2130°W
- Country: United Kingdom
- Line: East Coast Main Line
- Cause: Wheel failure

Statistics
- Trains: 1
- Deaths: 8 (including George Blake, aged 69, and Robert Reynolds, aged 12)
- Injured: 3

The 1870 Hatfield rail crash was a railway accident on Boxing day in 1870 at Marshmoor level crossing, 2 miles (3 km) south of Hatfield station, Hertfordshire, England.

== Accident ==
On a frosty Boxing day in 1870, the driver of the 16:25 from London King's Cross to Peterborough noticed an 'uneasy oscillation' as he passed over Marshmoor level crossing, 2 miles (3 km) south of Hatfield station. He peered back and discovered he had lost his train and pulled up. He reversed back, preceded by his fireman on foot showing a red light. They were met by the white-faced guard, who told them there had been a disaster. The driver reversed direction again and sped to Hatfield to warn oncoming traffic and summon help.

It transpired that as the train approached the crossing, the left-hand leading wheel of the van at the front of the train had disintegrated, and the coupling between the van and the locomotive had parted. The van and two following coaches then ran off the rails onto the roadway, demolishing a wall, the crossing gates and posts and killing the mother and sister of a signalman who were waiting at the crossing. In addition, six passengers in the two coaches were killed.

The accident inspector criticised the method of tyre-fixing and recommended, not for the first time, the use of Mansell composite wheels on passenger rolling stock.

== Sources ==
- Rolt, L.T.C.; Kichenside, Geoffrey (1982) [1955]. Red for Danger (4th ed.). Newton Abbot: David & Charles. pp. 76–77. ISBN 0-7153-8362-0.
