= Lemsford Road Halt railway station =

Former railway station in England

Coordinates: 51.7649°N 0.2315°W

Lemsford Road Halt

General information
- Location: Hatfield, Hertfordshire; England
- Platforms: 1

Other information
- Status: Disused

History
- Opened: 1 August 1942
- Closed: 1 October 1951
- Post-grouping: LNER
Location

Lemsford Road Halt was a railway station on the St Albans Branch of the Great Northern Railway. The platform is still visible next to the line of the old track, which has been converted to a cycle route and footpath, the Alban Way. The site of the station is located at grid reference TL 220 087 The station was built for the workers of the nearby de Havilland Aircraft factory. This station did not appear on railway time tables or maps during hostilities.

Preceding station	Disused railways	Following station
Nast Hyde Halt	London and North Eastern Railway; Hatfield and St Albans Railway	Hatfield
