= St Albans City railway station =

Railway station in Hertfordshire, England

St Albans City
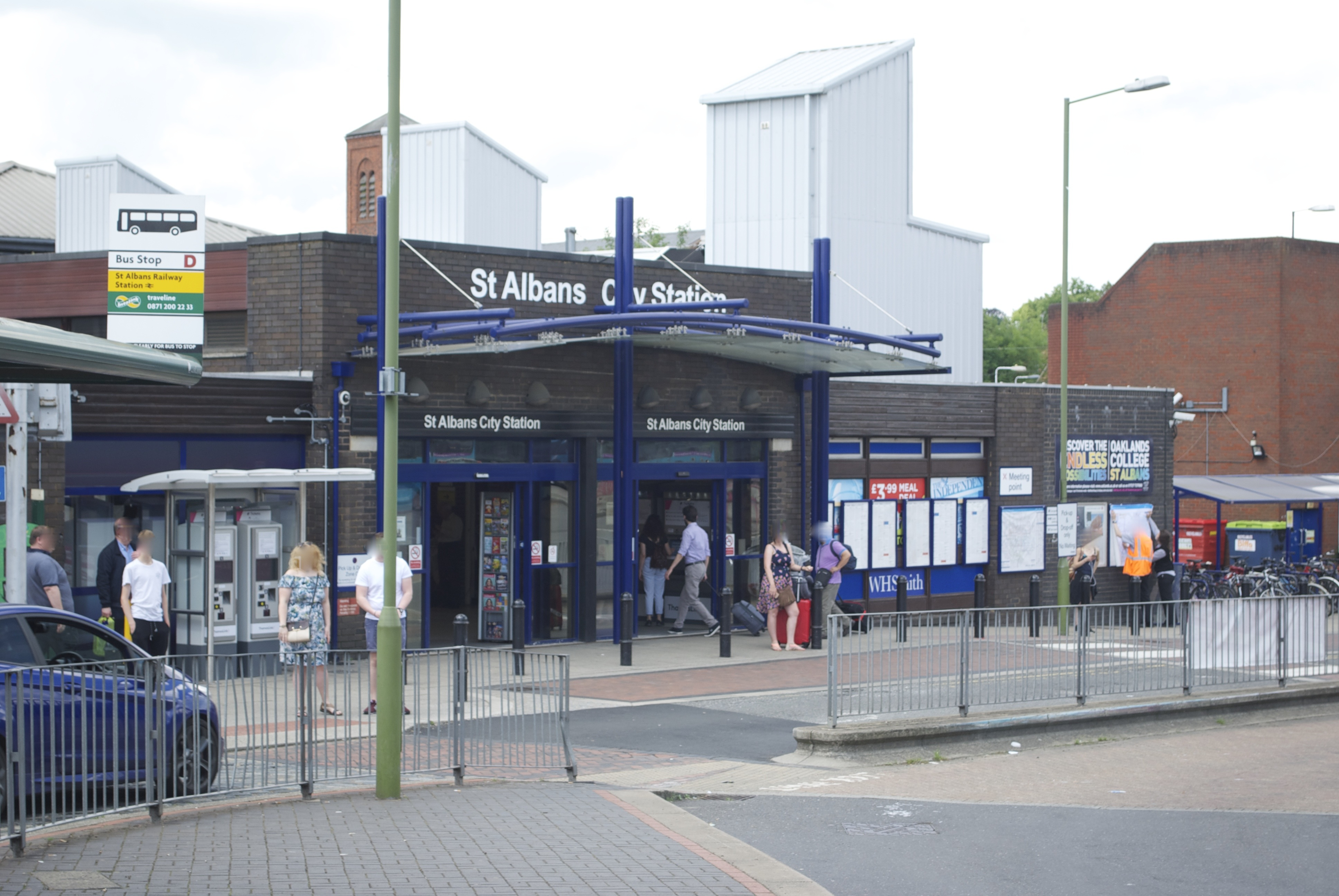
- Exterior of the main building on Station Way

General information
- Location: City of St Albans
- Coordinates: 51.7504°N 0.3274°W
- Grid position: TL155070
- Manager: Thameslink
- Platforms: 4

Construction
- Accessible: yes

Other information
- Station code: SAC
- Classification: DfT category B

Key dates
- 1 October 1868: Opened
- 1973: Rebuilt

Passengers
- 2020/21: ▼1.346 million
- Interchange: ▼60,394
- 2021/22: ▲3.877 million
- Interchange: ▲0.109 million
- 2022/23: ▲5.572 million
- Interchange: ▲0.122 million
- 2023/24: ▲6.319 million
- Interchange: ▲0.129 million
- 2024/25: ▲6.669 million
- Interchange: ▼0.110 million
Location
- Location within Hertfordshire

St Albans City railway station serves St Albans, in Hertfordshire, England. It is the larger of two stations in the city; the other is St Albans Abbey. It is on the Midland Main Line, 19 miles 71 chains (32.0 km) from London St Pancras. The station is managed by Govia Thameslink Railway, which also operates all services on the Thameslink route.

== History ==
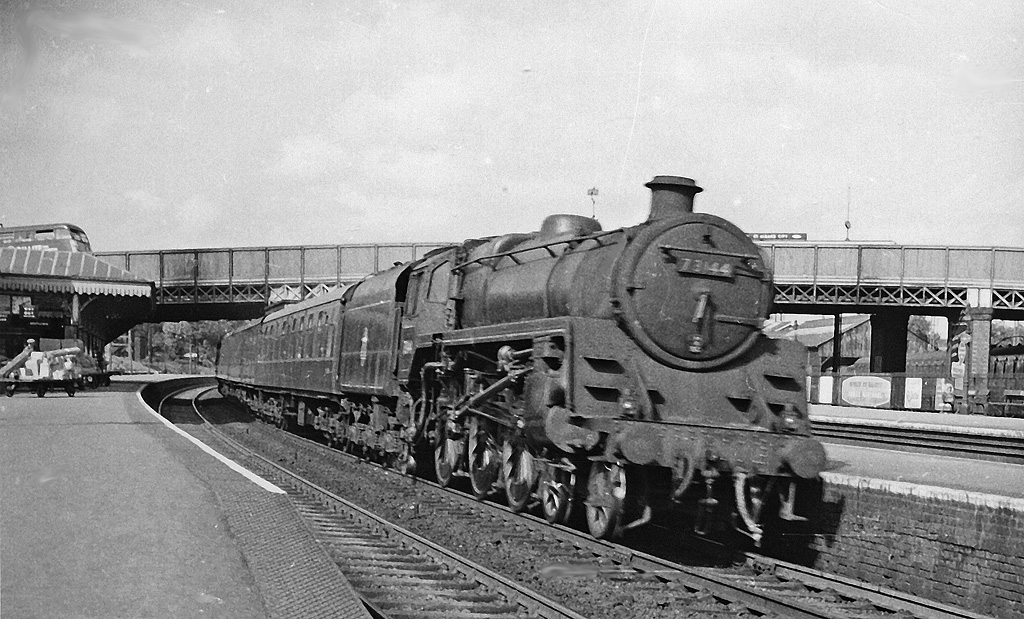
View northward with a southbound express in 1958

The station was built by the Midland Railway in 1868, on its extension to St Pancras. St Albans was famous for producing watercress, which was sent in 56-pound (25 kg) lots to London and Manchester.

St Albans Abbey, the other station serving the city, is a decade older and was built by the London and North Western Railway in 1858. There was originally a third station, London Road, built by the Hatfield and St Albans Railway in 1863 to connect with the Great Northern Railway.

== Description ==
The station has four platforms, two for each direction: one "fast" and one "slow". The main entrance, ticket office, multi-storey car park, taxi rank and bus connections are on Station Way, east of the station. There is a second exit to the west, to a small surface car park off Ridgmont Road and Victoria Street, located at the original entrance to the station. A larger surface car park to the east of the railway lines gained planning permission in 2003, in connection with a large residential development.

There are ticket barriers at both entrances.

The station participates in the Plusbus scheme where combined train and bus tickets can be bought at a reduced price.

The station underwent a refurbishment which saw the main entrance being completely rebuilt. This included a complete rebuild of the retail unit located at the main entrance, moving the toilets from platforms 2 and 3 to platforms 1 and 4. A new entrance on platform 4 was also built, which included brand new bicycle storage facilities. Refurbishment of the station was completed in December 2021.

The station currently houses a Sainsbury's Local which opened in February 2022 There are also three more retail units on platform 1 and one on platform 4. The units on platform 1 contain a Costa Coffee and a newsagent; the remaining retail unit on platform 4 has remained empty since the station's refurbishment in 2021.

St Albans South signal box has been restored immediately south of the station and has been opened as a visitor attraction by the St Albans Signal Box Preservation Trust.

Construction of a second footbridge was completed in 2022.

== Services ==
All services at St Albans City are operated by Govia Thameslink Railway, using Class 700 electric multiple units.

The typical off-peak service in trains per hour is:

- 6 tph to Luton, of which 4 continue to Bedford
- 2 tph to Brighton via Gatwick Airport
- 2 tph to Three Bridges via Redhill
- 2 tph to Rainham via Dartford
- 4 tph to Sutton (2 of these run via Mitcham Junction and 2 run via Wimbledon)

During peak hours, the station is served by additional services to and from East Grinstead.

The station is also served by a half-hourly night service between Bedford and Three Bridges on Sunday to Friday nights.

Preceding station	National Rail	Following station
Harpenden or Terminus	Thameslink Thameslink	West Hampstead Thameslink or Radlett
