= Hatfield and St Albans Railway =

Railway line in Hertfordshire, England

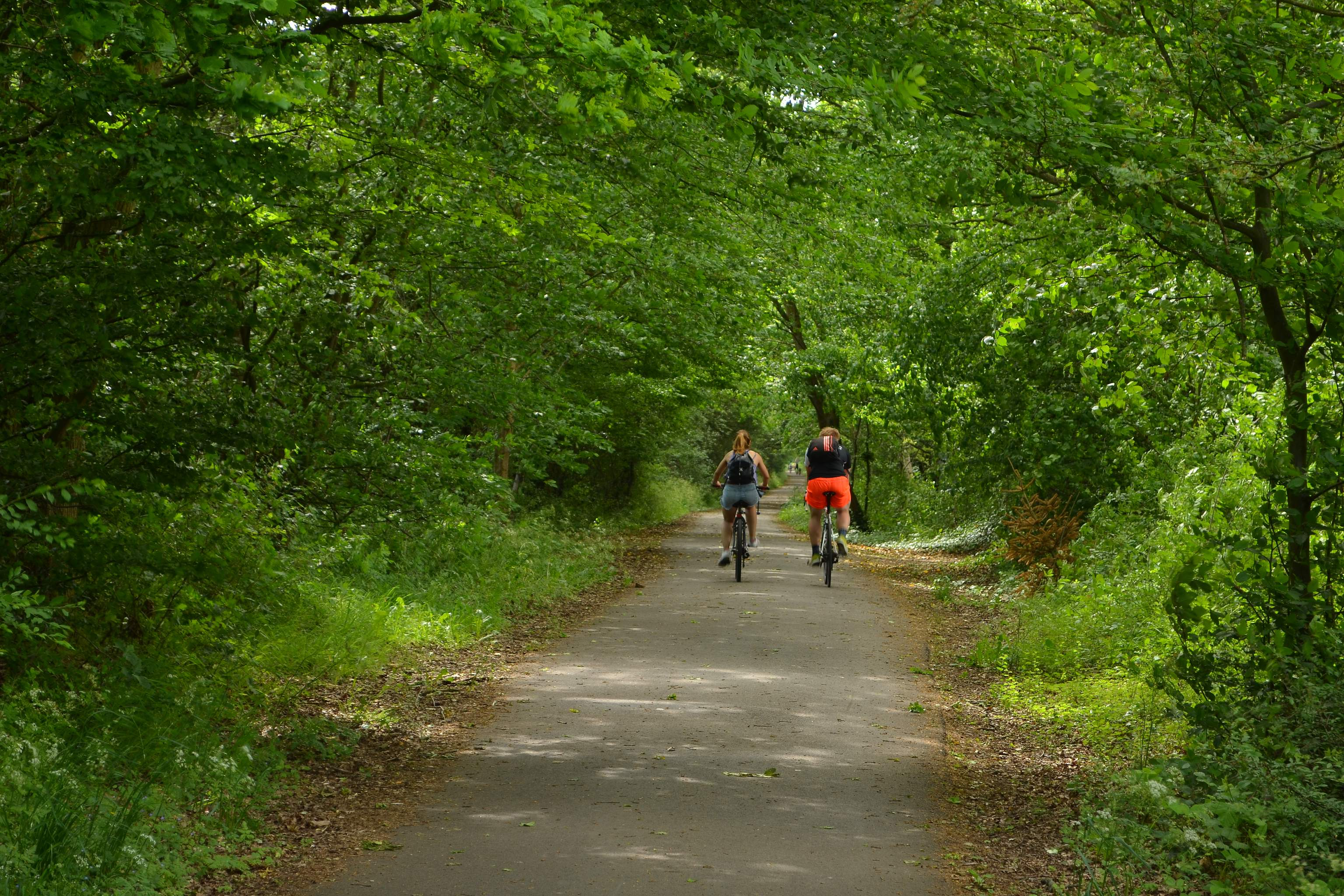
- Cyclists on the Alban Way in May 2017

Overview
- Locale: Hertfordshire, England
- Dates of operation: 1865–1968
- Successor: Abandoned

Technical
- Track gauge: 4 ft 8 1/2 in (1,435 mm)
- Length: 6 miles 34.25 chains (10.35 km)

The Hatfield and St Albans Railway was a branch of the Great Northern Railway which connected St Albans to Hatfield in Hertfordshire, England. It opened in 1865 with the principal aim of allowing St Albans traffic to access the Great Northern's main line to London at Hatfield, but soon came into difficulties when the Midland Railway inaugurated a direct route to London through St Albans. Passenger receipts declined in the 1930s, Passenger services were permanently withdrawn in 1951, leaving goods traffic to linger on until December 1968. Much of the route of the line is now incorporated into the Alban Way, a footpath and cycleway.

== History ==
=== Authorisation and opening ===
Hatfield and Saint Albans Railway Act 1862
- Act of Parliament
- Parliament of the United Kingdom
- Long title: An Act for making a Railway from the Great Northern Railway at Hatfield to the London and North-western Railway at Saint Albans; and for other Purposes.
- Citation: 25 & 26 Vict. c. lxxxvi

Dates
- Royal assent: 30 June 1862

Text of statute as originally enacted

The Hatfield and Saint Albans Railway Company was incorporated by the Hatfield and Saint Albans Railway Act 1862 (25 & 26 Vict. c. lxxxvi) on 30 June 1862. It had been promoted by various landowners in Hatfield and St Albans in Hertfordshire and supported by the Great Northern Railway, which saw the line as a means of regaining traffic lost to the London and North Western Railway since 1858 as a result of the opening of its Watford to St Albans line. The Great Northern agreed to contribute £20,000 (equivalent to £2,100,000 in 2025) to the total estimated cost of £88,000 (equivalent to £9,250,000 in 2025). Two lines were authorised: the first through the parishes of Hatfield, St Peter, St Stephen and St Albans to a junction with the London and North Western's St Albans line; the second from the parish of Hatfield to a junction on the northern side of Hatfield station on the Great Northern Main Line. The Great Northern opened its own St Albans station and was granted running powers into the LNWR station; the LNWR received reciprocal rights over the link line between the stations.

The new line opened on 1 September 1865 with one planned intermediate station at Springfield (renamed Smallford in 1879), although this was not ready in time. The Great Northern worked the line from the beginning and eventually absorbed the railway company on 1 November 1883.

=== Operations ===
The initial weekday service consisted of eight trains in each direction from St Albans and London King's Cross, with a journey time of 15 minutes between Hatfield and St Albans. On weekdays, services went through to the LNWR's St Albans station, but on Sundays they terminated at the GNR station. Services were drawn by Sharp 2-2-2Ts until the 1870s, when Sharp 0-4-2T rebuilds and Sturrock 0-4-2Ts were used. The opening of the Midland Main Line through St Albans in 1868 saw receipts fall on the line and the Hatfield and St Albans Railway was unable to pay its debts. A receiver was appointed and the independent company had no choice but to be absorbed by the Great Northern, this being formalised by an Act of Parliament in 1883.

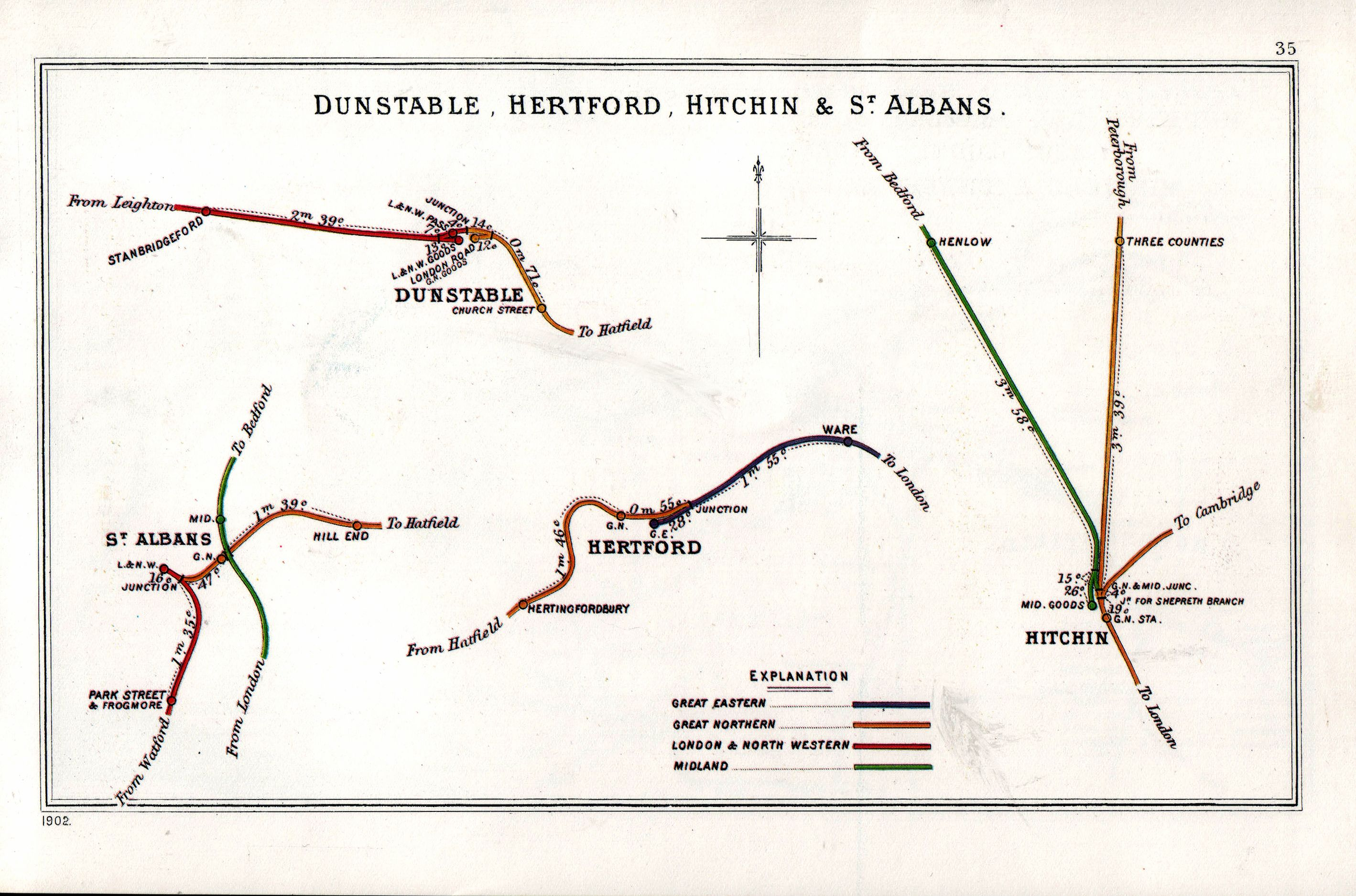
A 1902 Railway Clearing House Junction Diagram showing (lower left) the western end of the Hatfield and St Albans Railway (orange) in GNR days

The Great Northern tried to counter the effect of the Midland, by running a few through coaches from St Albans to King's Cross but this did not last. It tried instead to foster local commuter traffic by timing the connections at Hatfield, so that services from St Albans, Luton and Hertford arrived within a few minutes of each other, whilst leaving a few minutes for the King's Cross connection. This was not competitive with the Midland's Main Line, but St Albans and Hatfield as well as surrounding villages prospered as local traffic developed. In 1897 a new station and siding opened at Salvation Army Halt followed by Hill End in 1899. A third station was opened in 1910 at Nast Hyde Halt. By the 1920s, Class C12 4-4-2T locomotives were the mainstay of the branch, carrying out all passenger and freight workings, except for the final passenger working which was made by any available Hatfield locomotive.

=== Decline and closure ===
By the late 1930s, passenger numbers were declining in the face of increased competition from bus transport. Passenger trains became uneconomic and in September 1939, following the start of hostilities, the LNER withdrew them. The needs of the de Havilland aircraft works at Hatfield however obliged the railway company to reopen the line three months later. To facilitate access to the factory and to reduce the number of cars which would attract enemy attention, the LNER opened an unstaffed halt at Lemsford Road in 1942. Passenger numbers fell back to their pre-war level once the war ended, and passenger services were again withdrawn in 1951. The last passenger service on 28 September 1951 was the 5.08 from Hatfield, hauled by Class N7/1 No. 69644, which took 23 minutes to reach St Albans Abbey.

Goods services continued for a further 18 years; two goods trains per day in each direction ran in the summer of 1963, carrying mainly coal for the St Albans gasworks. The line continued to be unprofitable and general goods services were withdrawn on 5 October 1964. A weekly service continued until the end of the year to the Salvation Army siding in order to fulfil the contract, and banana trains ran to Butterwick siding when needed. As there was no traffic beyond this point, the rails were lifted from a point near Colney Lane Bridge to the junction with the Watford line. The remaining section of the line closed on 31 December 1968. A contract with a scrap metal dealer at Smallford had meant that trains ran there until the end of 1968.

== The line today ==
After tracklifting in 1969, the councils of Welwyn Hatfield and St Albans purchased the trackbed for conversion into a footpath and cycletrack. Most overbridges had been removed and the construction of the A1(M) tunnel destroyed a section of the route near Hatfield. The first section of the route between Old Man's Lane and Hill End opened as the Smallford Trail on 8 December 1985, with the remaining part to Hatfield opening in mid-1986. The final section from Hill End to St Albans was officially opened on 17 April 1988, and the footpath is now known as the Alban Way.

The platforms at Hill End, Nast Hyde Halt and Lemsford Road Halt have survived, as have the station buildings at Smallford. London Road station is now a listed building.

== Gallery ==
These May 2017 photographs are ordered from the Hatfield end towards the St Albans end.

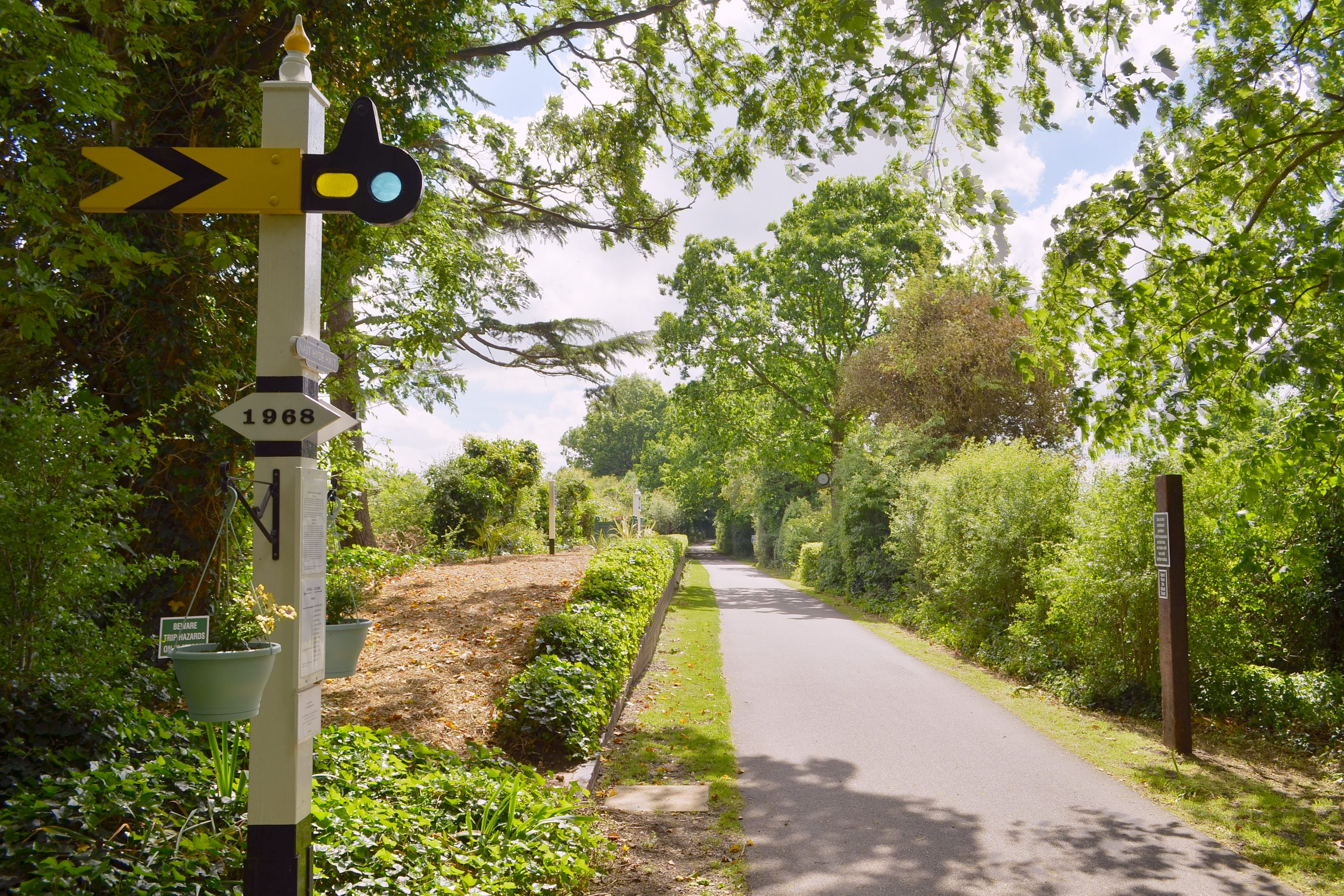
Remains of Nast Hyde Halt railway station

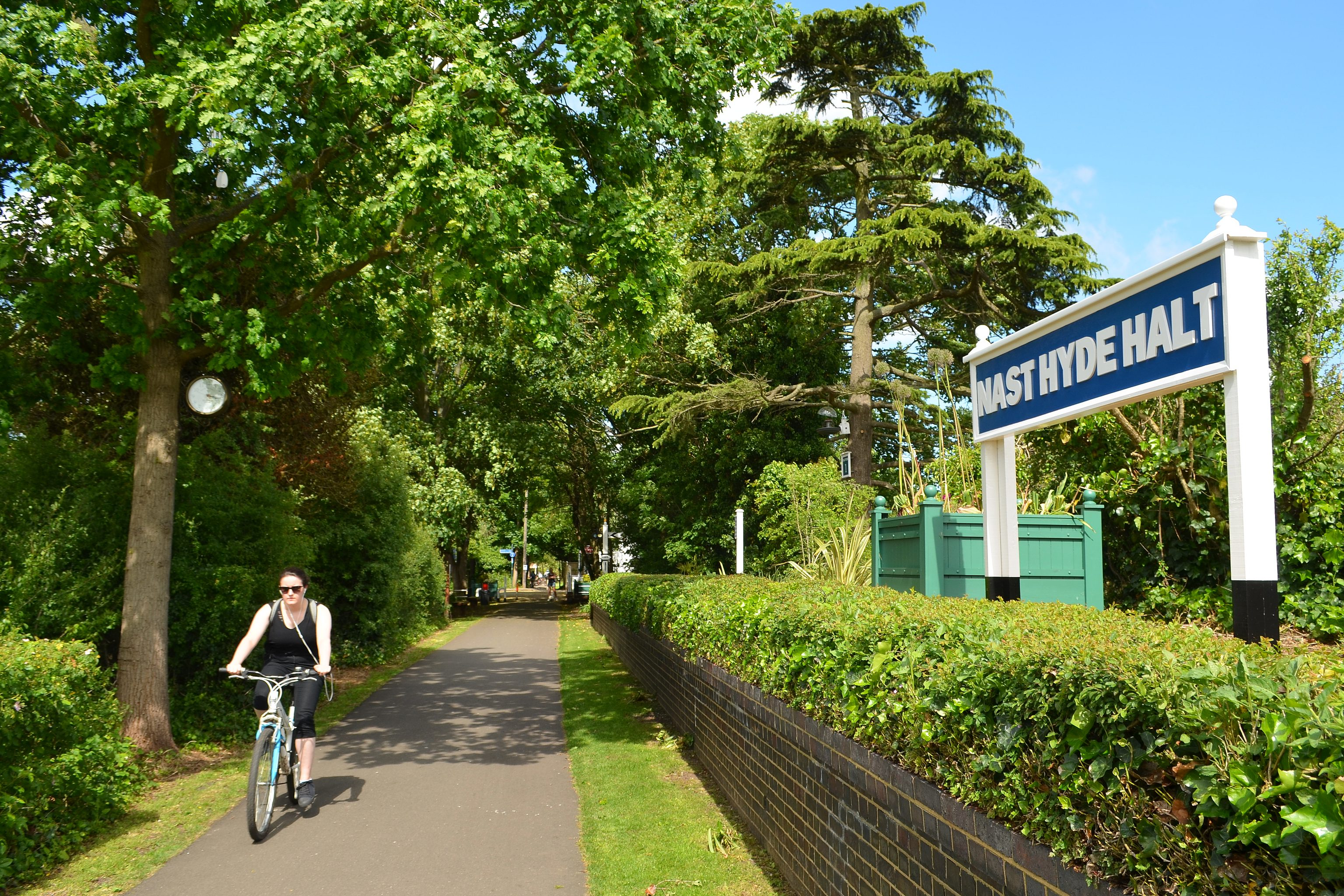
Nast Hyde Halt railway station platform

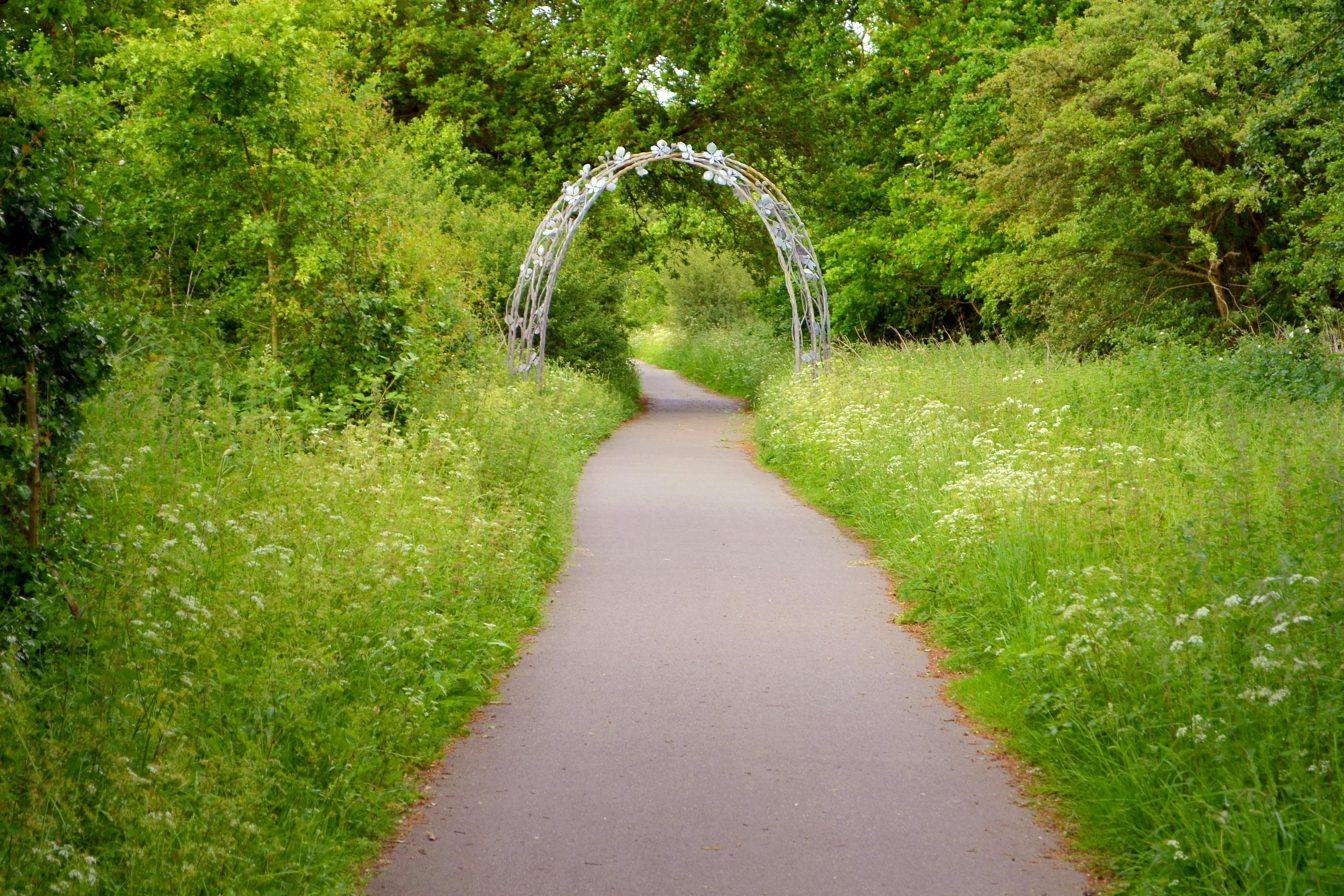
Sculptural arch on the Alban Way

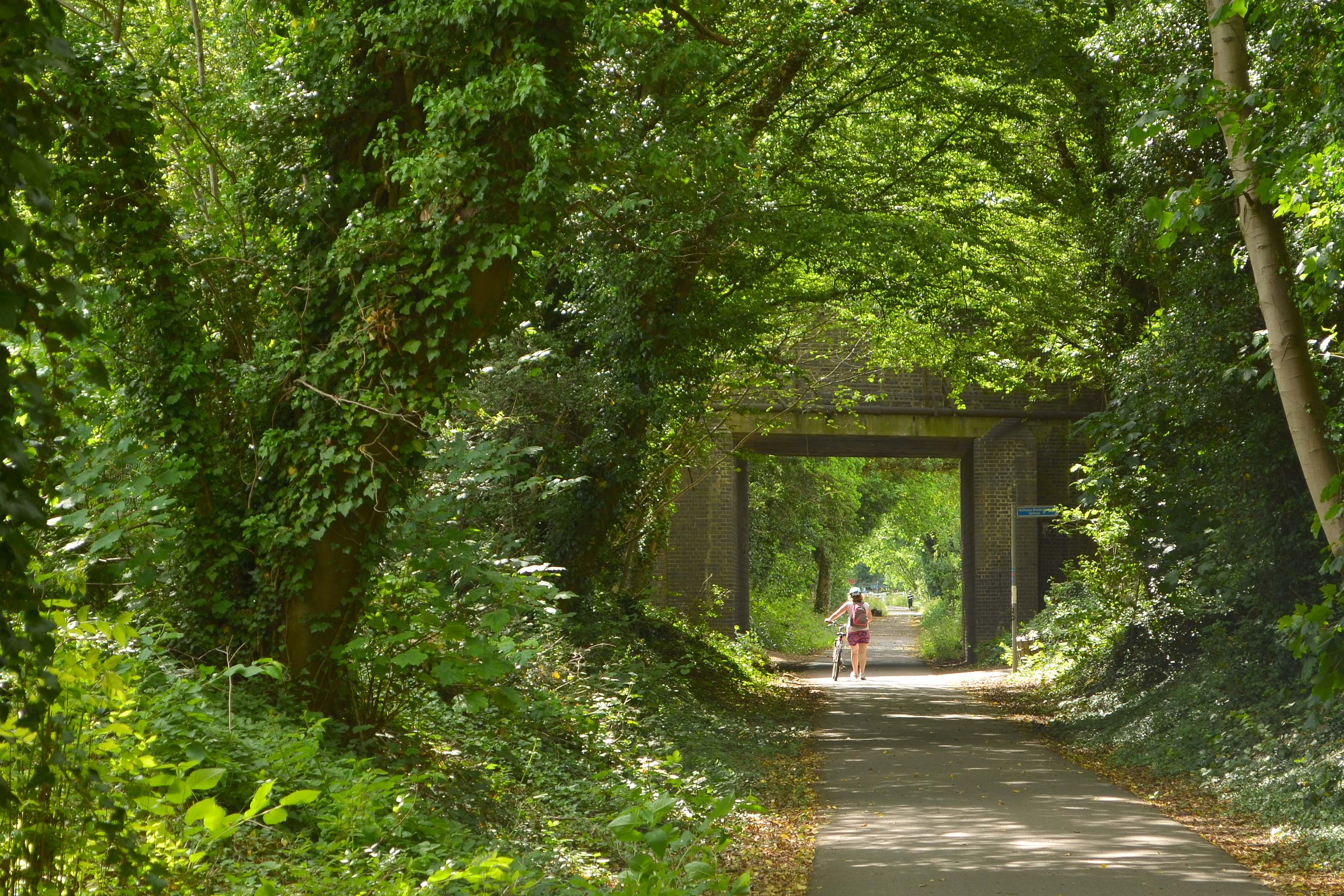
Hill End Lane bridge

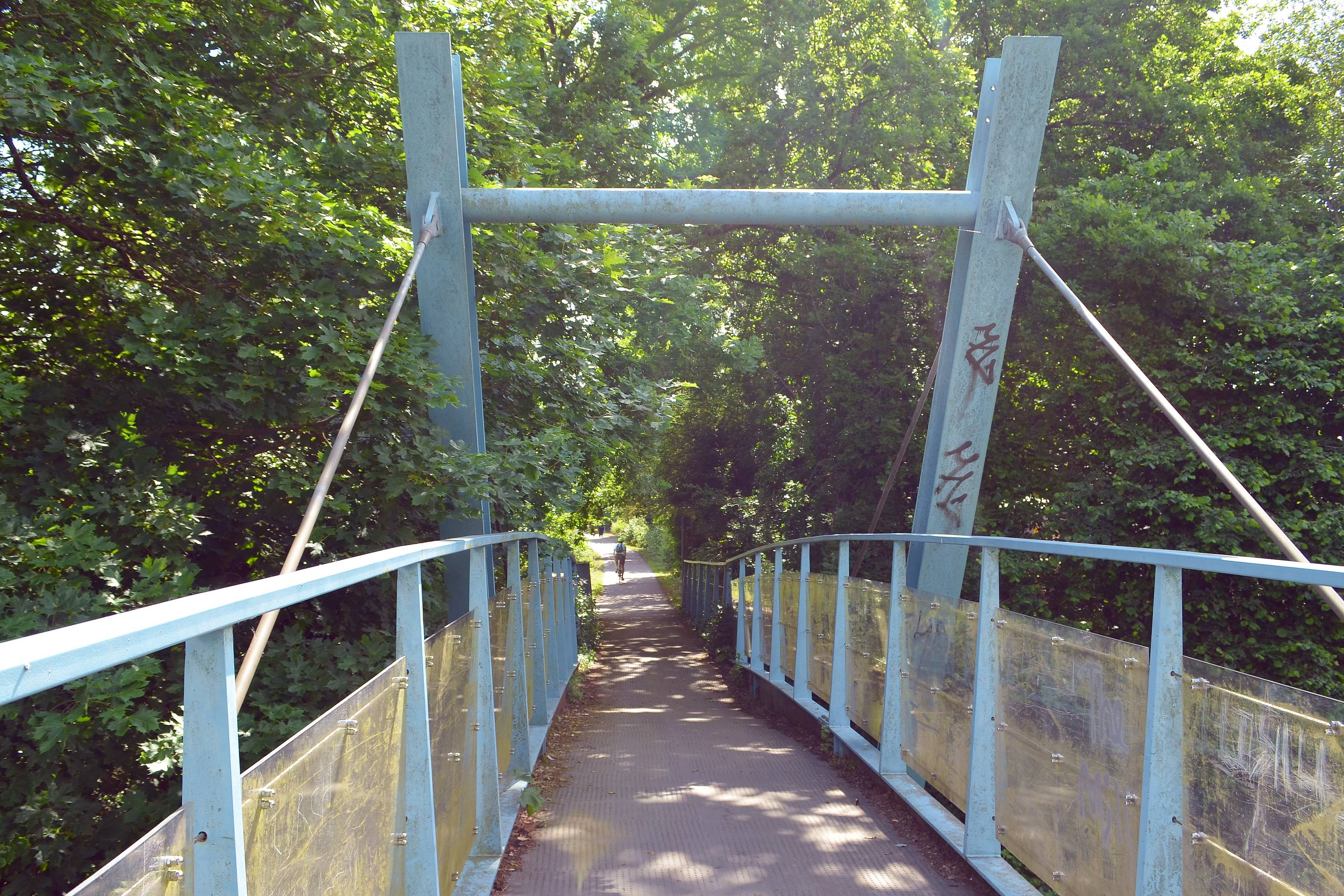
Bridge over Camp Road

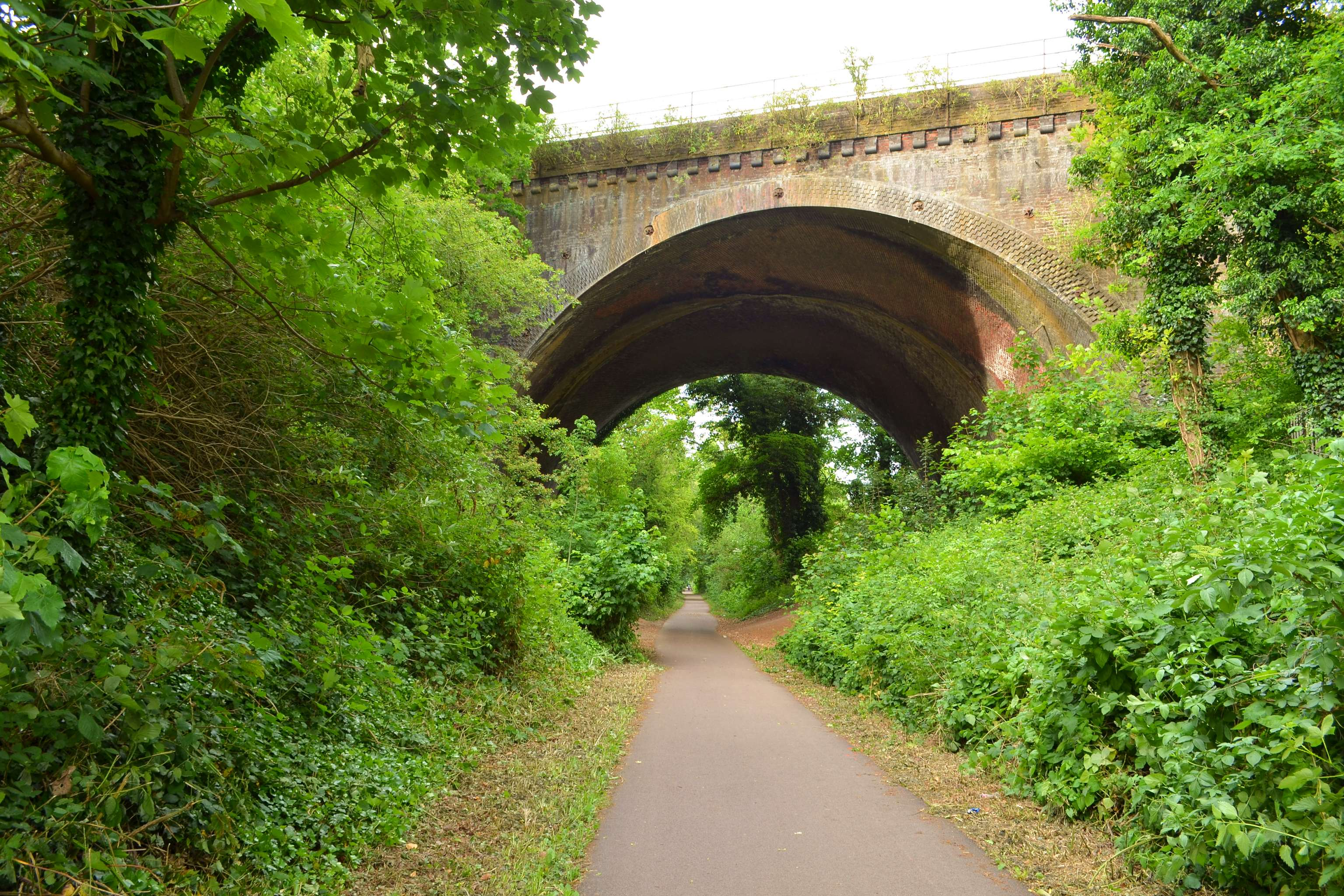
Midland Railway bridge

== Sources ==
- Cockman, F.G. (1983). The Railways of Hertfordshire. Stevenage, Herts: Hertfordshire Publications. ISBN 0-901354-24-4.
- Davies, R.T.; Grant, M.D. (1984) [1975]. Forgotten Railways: Chilterns and Cotswolds (Vol. 3). Newton Abbot, Devon: David St John Thomas. ISBN 0-946537-07-0.
- Gordon, D.I. (1990). A Regional History of the Railways of Great Britain: The Eastern Counties (Volume 5). Newton Abbot, Devon: David St John Thomas. ISBN 978-0-946537-55-6.
- Oppitz, Leslie (2000). Lost Railways of the Chilterns (Lost Railways Series). Newbury, Berkshire: Countryside Books. ISBN 978-1-85306-643-6.
- Shannon, Paul (May 1996) [1995]. British Railways Past and Present: Buckinghamshire, Bedfordshire and West Hertfordshire (No. 24). Wadenhoe, Peterborough: Past & Present Publishing Ltd. ISBN 978-1-85895-073-0.
- Taylor, Roger D.; Anderson, Brian (1988). The Hatfield and St Albans Branch of the Great Northern Railway (Locomotion Papers No. 168). Tarrant Hinton, Dorset: The Oakwood Press. ISBN 0-85361-373-7.
