= Hatfield railway station =

Railway station in Hertfordshire, England

Hatfield
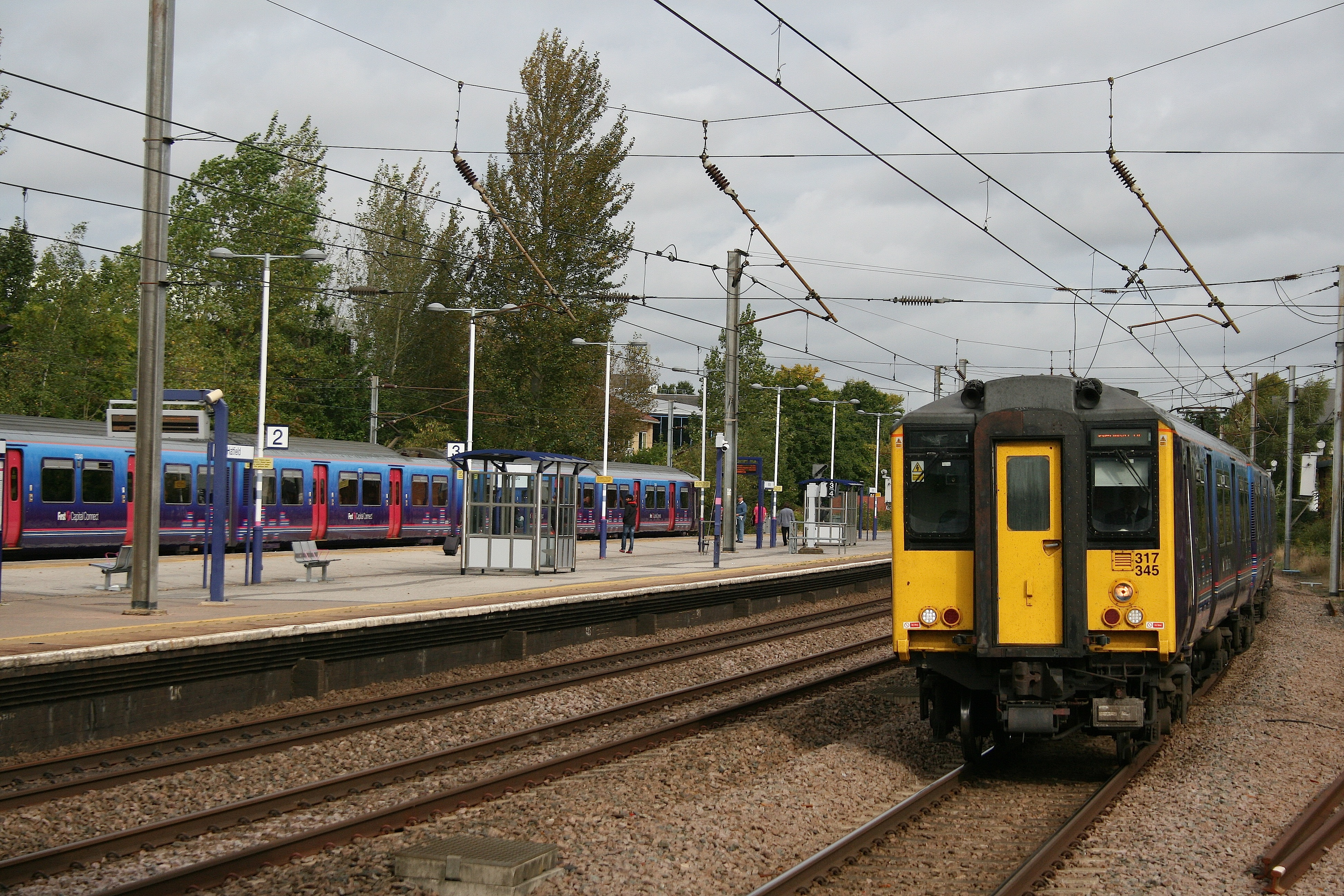
- Interactive map of Hatfield

General information
- Location: Hatfield
- Local authority: Borough of Welwyn Hatfield
- Grid reference: TL232087
- Managed by: Great Northern
- Station code: HAT
- DfT category: C2
- Number of platforms: 3
- Tracks: 4
- Accessible: Yes

National Rail annual entry and exit
- 2020–21: ▼0.591 million
- 2021–22: ▲1.552 million
- 2022–23: ▲2.188 million
- 2023–24: ▲2.318 million
- 2024–25: ▲2.458 million

Railway companies
- Original company: Great Northern Railway
- Pre-grouping: Great Northern Railway
- Post-grouping: London and North Eastern Railway

Key dates
- 7 August 1850: Station opened
- September 2013: Station redevelopment began
- 17 November 2014: Multi-storey Car Park opened

Other information
- External links: Departures; Facilities
- Coordinates: 51.764°N 0.216°W

Hatfield railway station serves the town of Hatfield in Hertfordshire, England. The station is managed by Great Northern. It is 17 miles 54 chains (28.4 km) measured from London King's Cross on the East Coast Main Line.

== History ==
Hatfield was formerly the junction of a branch to St Albans. The Hatfield and St Albans Railway closed to passenger traffic in 1951 as part of postwar economies brought in by the British Transport Commission. The route of the line is now a public footpath, the Alban Way.

=== Station masters ===
- Mr. Unwin ca. 1850 (acting)
- Edmund Cooter 1856 - 1866 (formerly station master at Hornsey)
- Mr. Bellamy ???? - 1878
- Robert Vodden 1878 - 1906
- Thomas Christopher 1910 - 1915 (afterwards station master at Doncaster)
- John Thomas Cross 1917 - 1923
- Frederick B. Martin 1932 - 1939
- Arthur W. Bellamy 1940 - 1949
- T.J. Piggott 1951 - ???? (formerly station master at Sandy)
- A.G. Dixon ca. 1960

== Facilities ==
Hatfield has waiting rooms on all platforms, with extra shelters provided at various points along the platforms, as well as a canopy on Platform 1. There is a small café-shop style business, "Café Rosso" on Platform 1, and three new retail units which opened in the new station building currently home to an AAA Taxis booking office, Morrisons Daily and Kerbside Coffee. There are three platform faces in total - platform 1 is a side platform facing the Up Slow line & used by London-bound trains (there is no platform on the Up Fast line), whilst platforms 2 & 3 face the Down Fast and Down Slow lines respectively; the latter is used by the majority of northbound trains.

The station has a "Fast-Ticket" machine, as well as a standard touchscreen machine on either side of the building. Hatfield also has many vending machines throughout the station and a photo booth inside the booking hall, which also contains male/female toilets and a separate disabled toilet. Ticket barriers are in operation.

== Services ==
Off-peak, all services at Hatfield are operated by Great Northern using Class 387 and 717 EMUs.

The typical off-peak service in trains per hour is:

- 2 tph to London King's Cross (semi-fast)
- 2 tph to Moorgate (all stations)
- 2 tph to Welwyn Garden City only
- 2 tph to Letchworth Garden City of which 1 continues to Cambridge

Additional services, including several Thameslink operated services to and from Sevenoaks via Catford call at the station during the peak hours.

Preceding station	National Rail	Following station
Welham Green	Great Northern Great Northern Route Stopping Services	Welwyn Garden City
Potters Bar	Great Northern Great Northern Route Semi-Fast Services	Welwyn Garden City
Potters Bar	Thameslink Thameslink Peak Hours Only	Welwyn Garden City
	Disused railways	
Lemsford Road Halt Line and station closed	London and North Eastern Railway Hatfield and St Albans Railway	Terminus

== Redevelopment ==
Hatfield Station was redeveloped in 2013—15 to include a new bus interchange and taxi rank, multi-storey car park, refurbished ticket office, three new retail units and step-free access to all platforms.

Work on the project, which was to cost £9 million, began in 2013 and was completed by the end of 2015.

The new multi-storey car park opened on 17 November 2014.

== Accidents ==
Three fatal rail crashes have occurred near Hatfield:

- December 1870 accident, when a disintegrated wheel resulted in the deaths of six passengers and two bystanders.
- Two accidents occurred on 26 January 1939. In the first, an empty fish train was involved in a rear-end collision with a passenger train. The second involved a passenger train which ran into the rear of another. Two people were killed and seven were injured.
- October 2000 accident, when a GNER InterCity 225 train de-railed, killing four people and injuring 70.

== Gallery ==
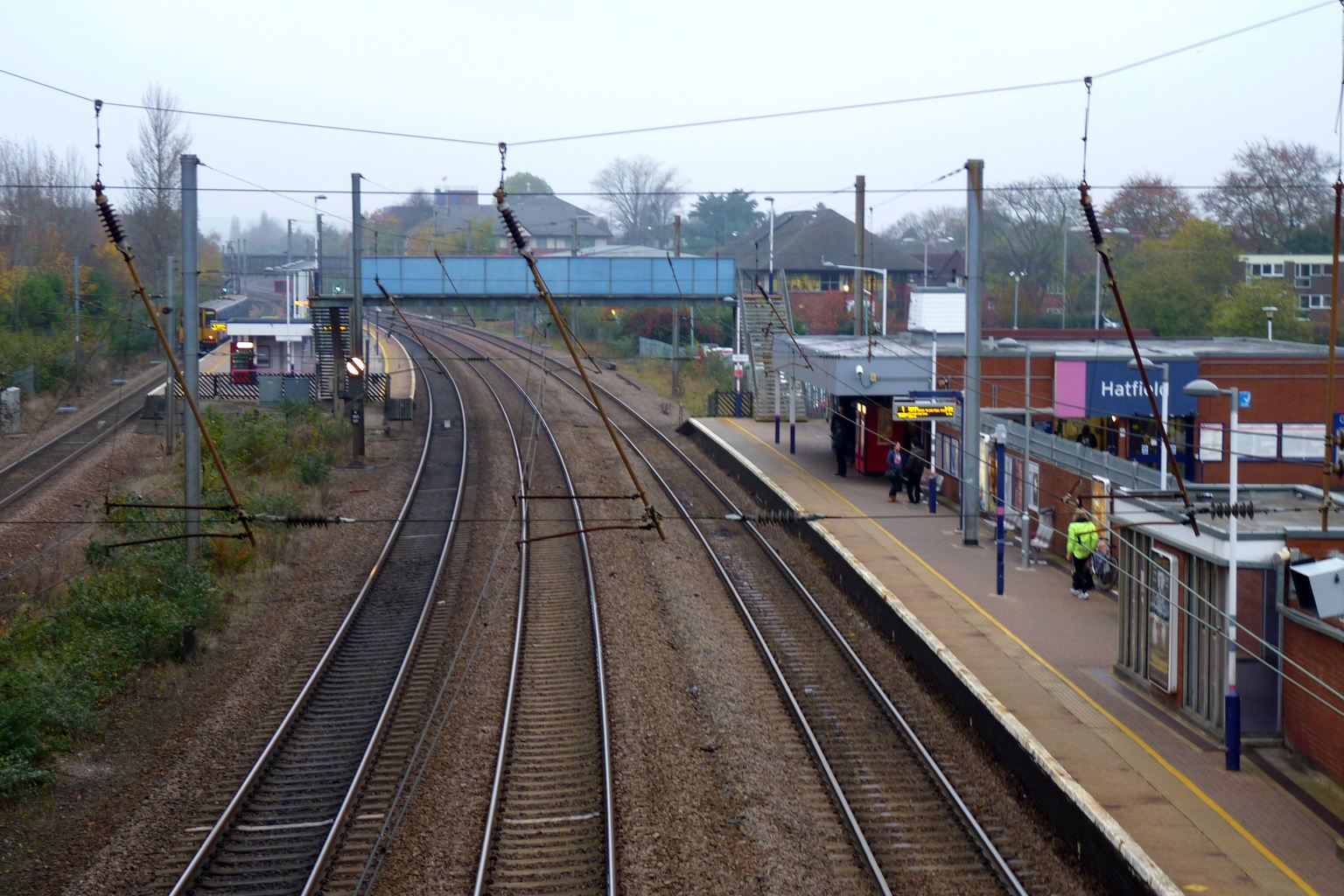
Hatfield railway station viewed from the public footbridge.

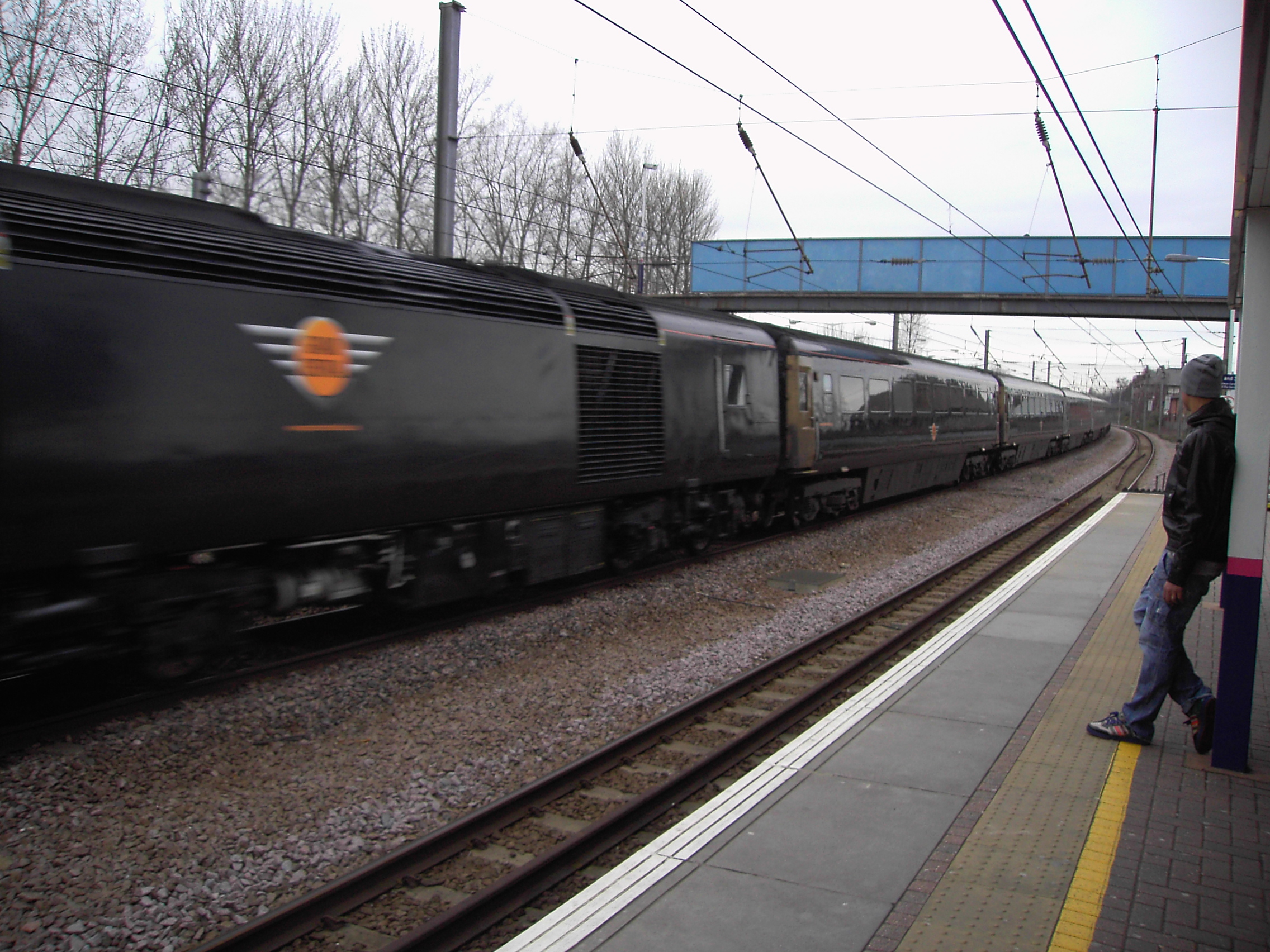
A Grand Central train speeds through Hatfield en route from Sunderland.

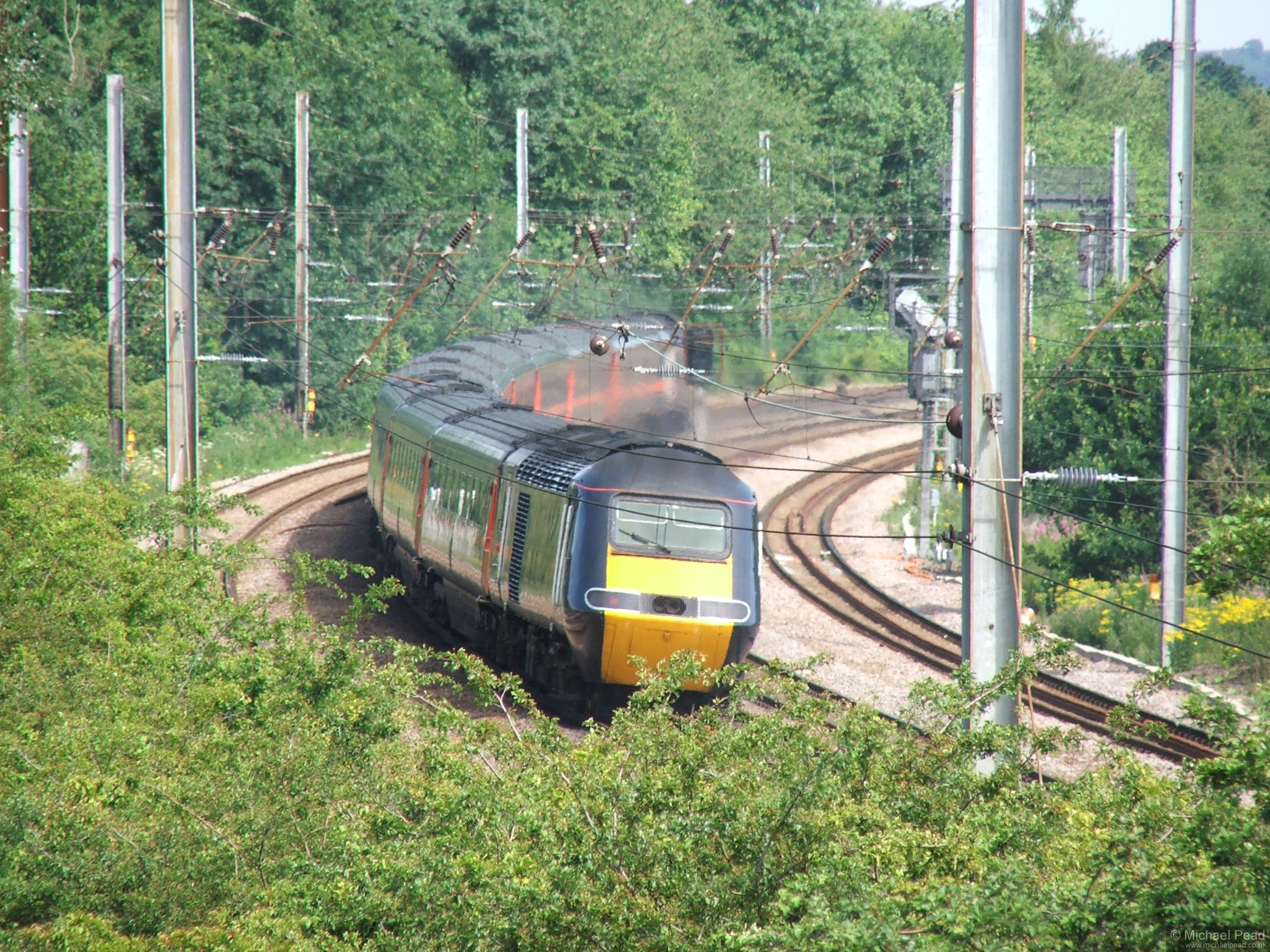
