= Nast Hyde Halt railway station =

Disused railway station in Hertfordshire, England

Coordinates: 51.7557°N 0.2490°W

Nast Hyde Halt
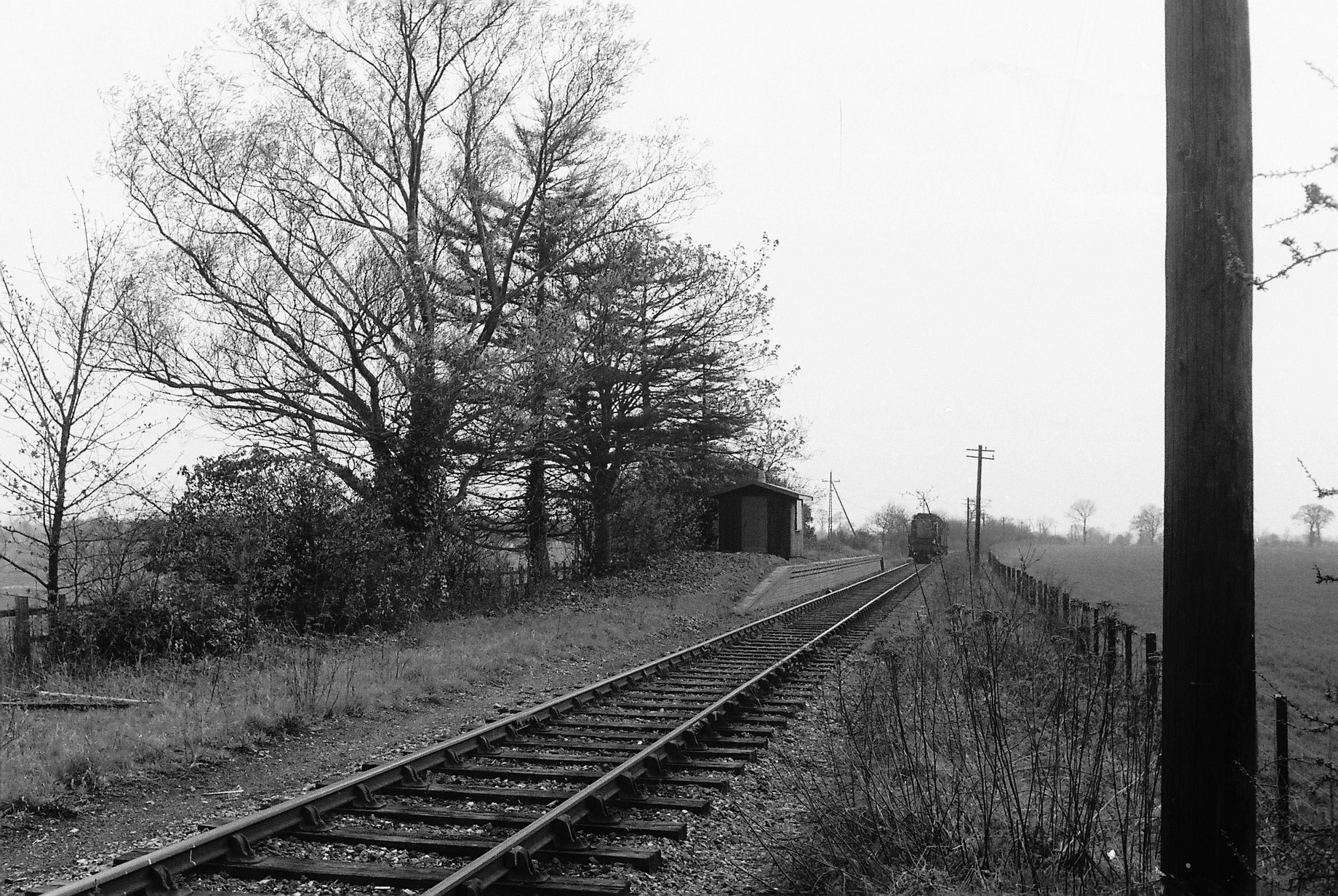

General information
- Location: Hatfield, Hertfordshire, St. Albans; England
- Grid reference: TL210078
- Platforms: 1

Other information
- Status: Disused

History
- Pre-grouping: GNR

Key dates
- 1 February 1910: Halt opened
- 1 October 1951: Halt closed
Location

Nast Hyde Halt is a disused railway station in Hertfordshire. It was opened in 1910 to serve the new houses being built in the area. It is also said that a local householder, Oliver Bury, asked for the halt to be opened in order that he could use the line to commute to Kings Cross.

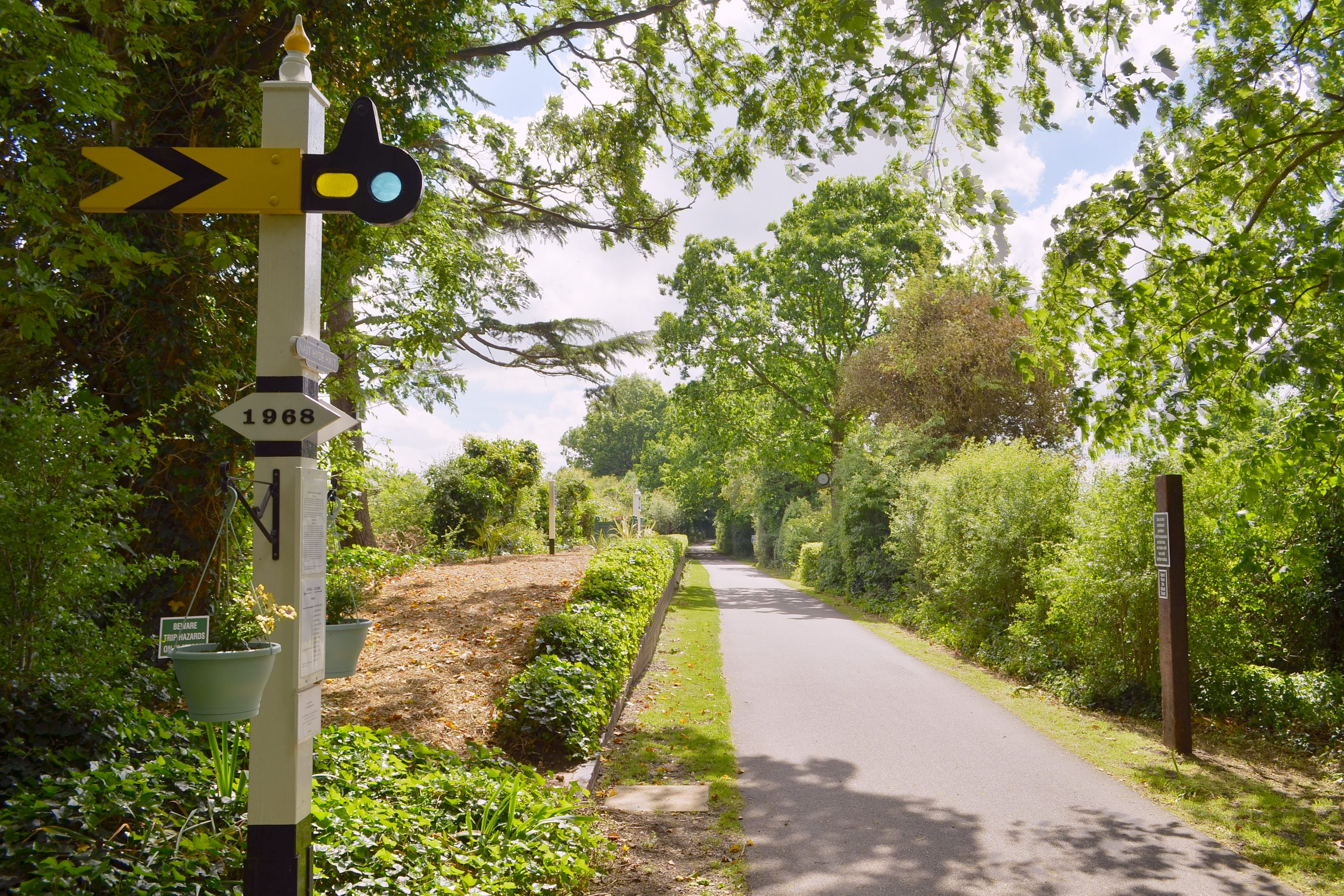
Remains of Nast Hyde Halt railway station in May 2017

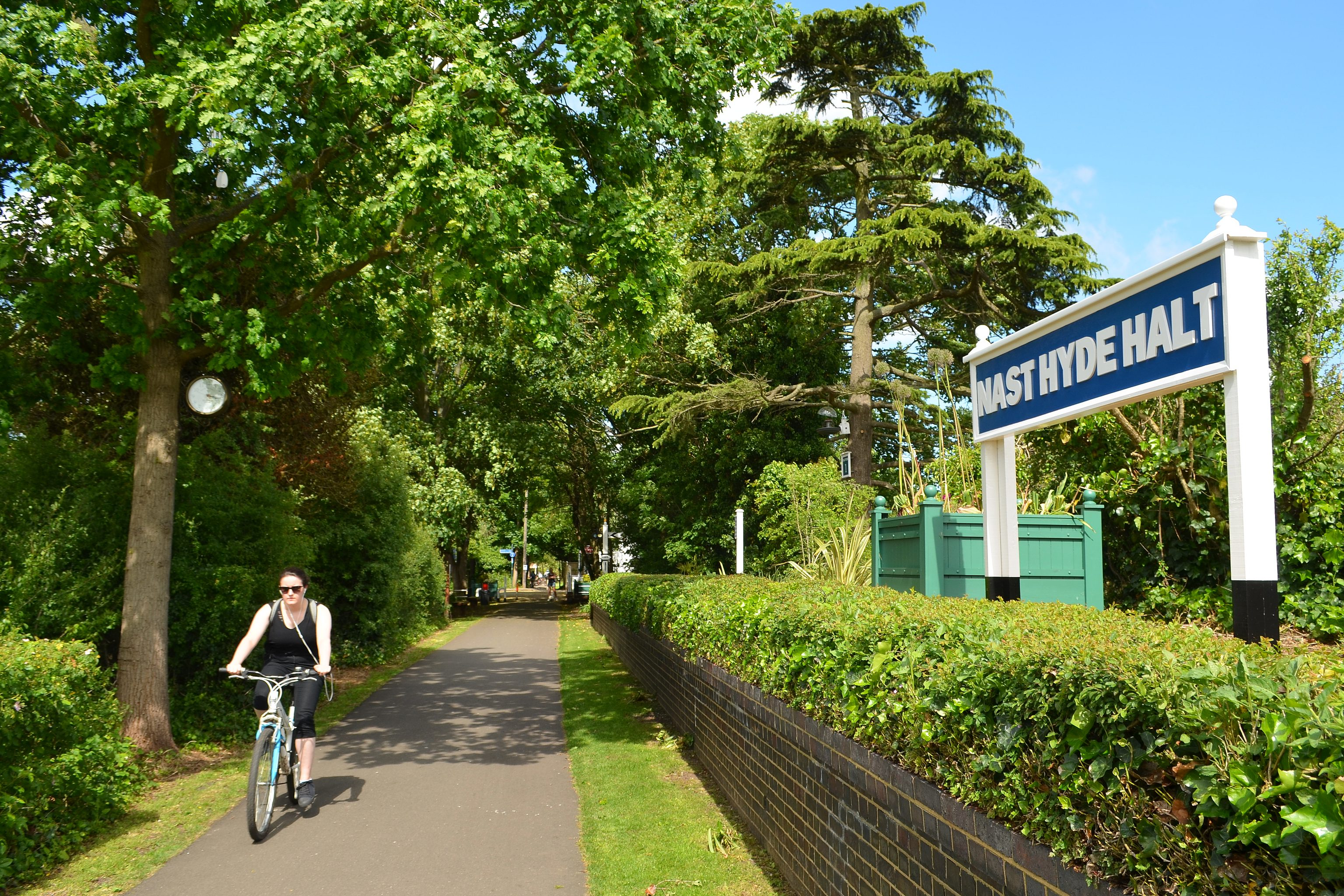
Nast Hyde Halt railway station platform in May 2017

Preceding station	Disused railways	Following station
Smallford	London and North Eastern Railway; Hatfield and St Albans Railway	Lemsford Road Halt
