= Alban Way =

Rail trail in Hertfordshire, England

Coordinates: 51.752°N 0.259°W

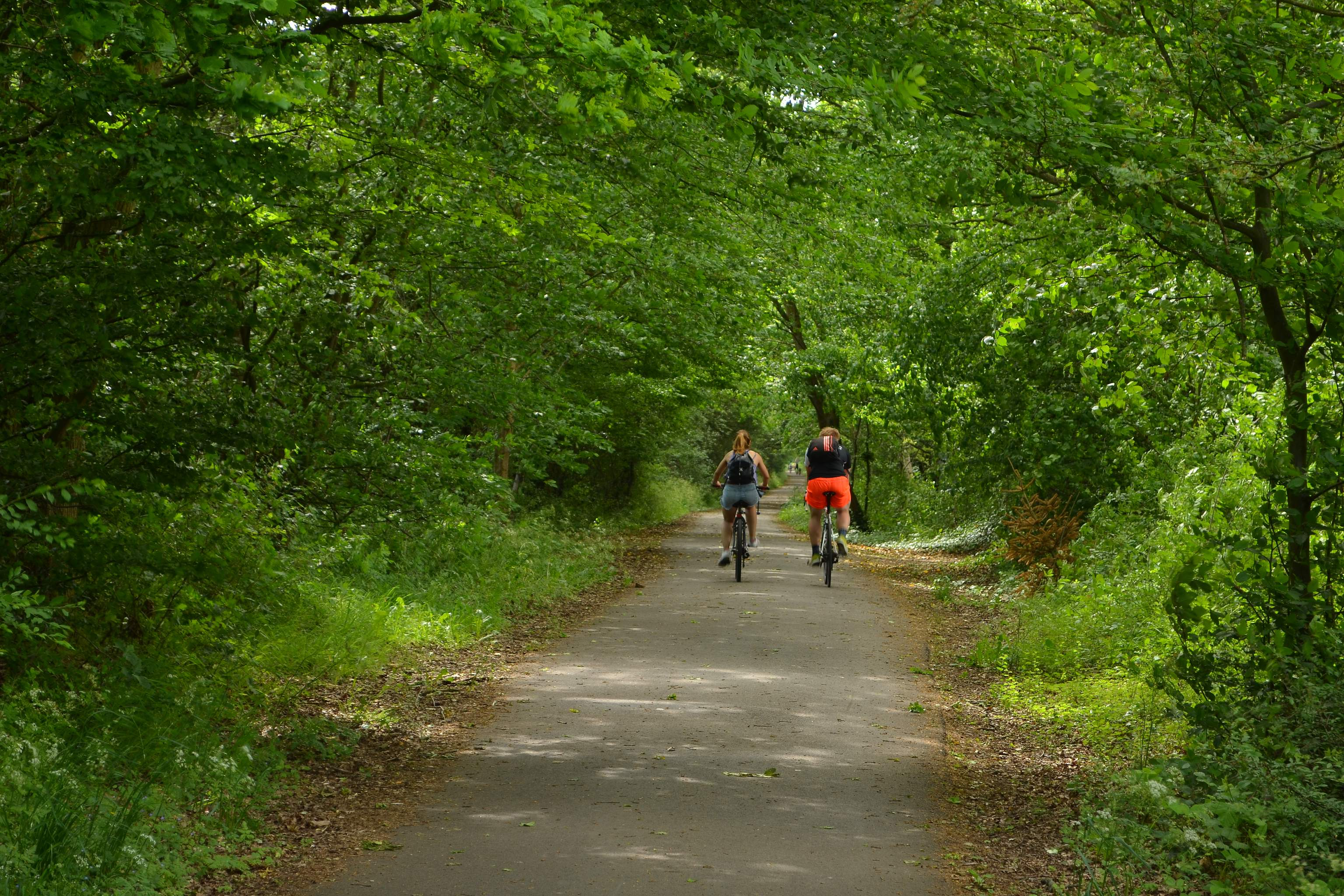
- Cyclists on the Alban Way in May 2017
- Length: 6.3 mi (10.1 km)
- Location: Hertfordshire, England
- Trailheads: Hatfield - St Albans
- Use: Hiking, Cycling, Horseriding

The Alban Way is a shared-use path along the former Hatfield and St Albans Railway in Hertfordshire, England. The route is 6.3 miles (10.1 km) long and is owned by St Albans City & District Council and Welwyn Hatfield Borough Council, within their respective boundaries.

== History ==
The Hatfield and St Albans Railway opened in 1865 and was in use for passengers until 1951 and freight trains until 1969.

== Route ==
The path runs from St Albans, close to St Albans Abbey railway station and the site of Roman Verulamium, through Fleetville and Smallford to Hatfield; it ends close to Hatfield railway station.

Part of National Cycle Network Route 61, which runs from the River Thames at Maidenhead to the River Lea in Ware, the Alban Way is fully tarmacked throughout making it usable all year round. It can be linked to a separate section of Route 61, also along a disused railway route, runs from Welwyn Garden City to Hertford and is called the Cole Green Way.

The remains of most of the station platforms still exist along the route, with many as of 2017 having recently been refurbished along with signage and street names painted into the tarmac. A station building still stands at the London Road exit in St Albans, which has been converted into a nursery, while at Nast Hyde Halt a replica semaphore signal has been erected along with a garden and other signage.

At what used to be Hill End Station, a small remembrance park has been created to remember a former mental health hospital that existed at the site. It is located in what was the hospital's graveyard, once close to the track opposite Longacres park. Most of the graves are covered and few remain intact but include a plaque describing the story behind the gravestones, including some details about specific patients.

Within the section that runs through Welwyn Hatfield, three smaller stations were on route before Hatfield: Nast Hyde Halt, Lemsford Road Halt and Fiddlebridge. Part of the route in the 1980s was cut through by the A1(M) and Hatfield Tunnel and passes close to The Galleria.

In Hatfield, the route joins the Great North Way (National Cycle Network route 12) and, in St Albans, links to National Cycle Network route 6.

== Future proposals ==
There was once some speculation that the railway may be reinstated in the future as an extension to the proposed Abbey Line tram system although this never materialised.

== Bus connections ==
[Red Eagle] route S4 provides a link to the start of the route by Cottonmill Lane. Passengers should alight at Weyman's to join the route. Bus service 601 by Uno also runs close to part of the route from Fleetville to Hatfield.

== Gallery ==
These May 2017 photographs are ordered from the Hatfield end towards the St Albans end.

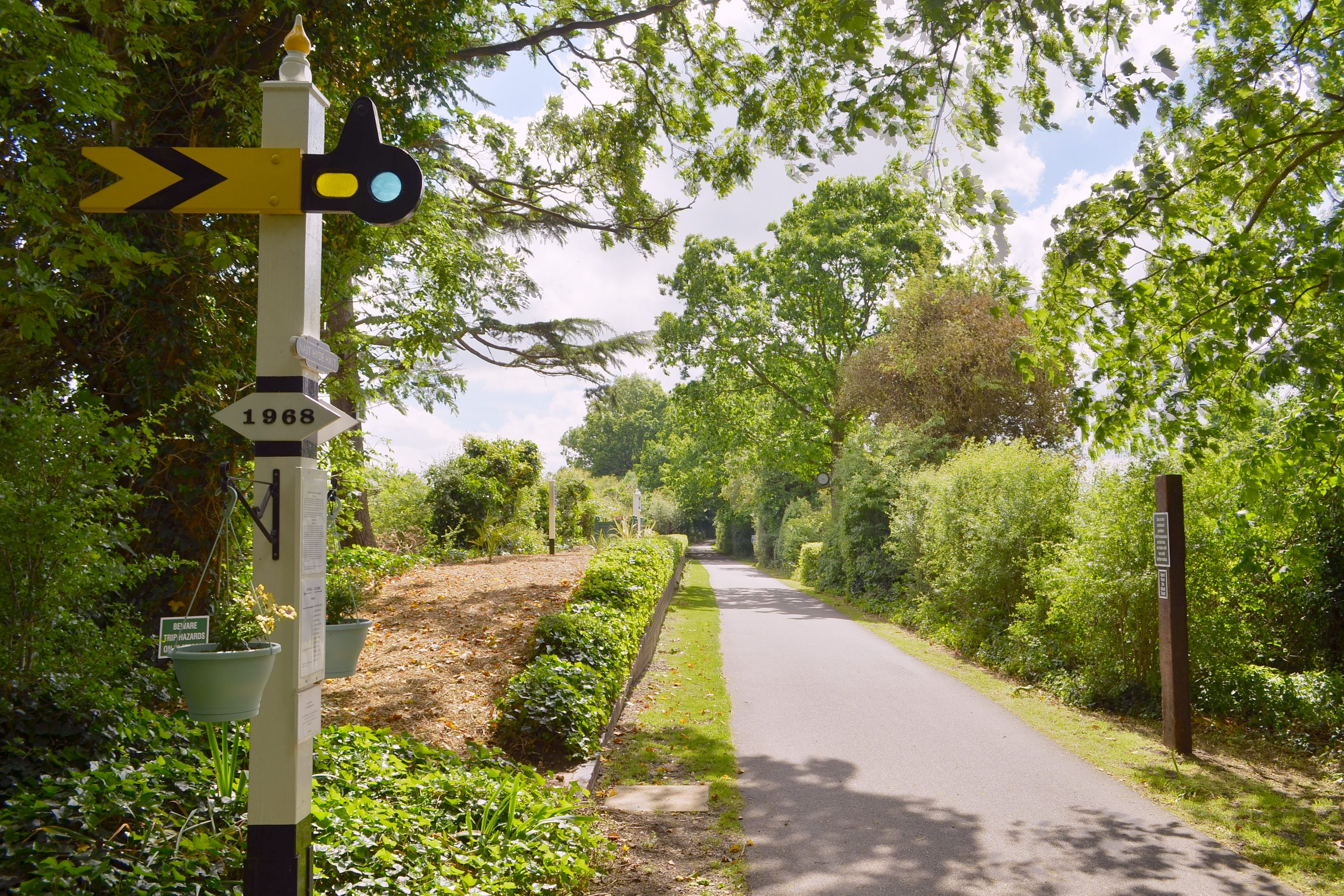
Remains of Nast Hyde Halt railway station

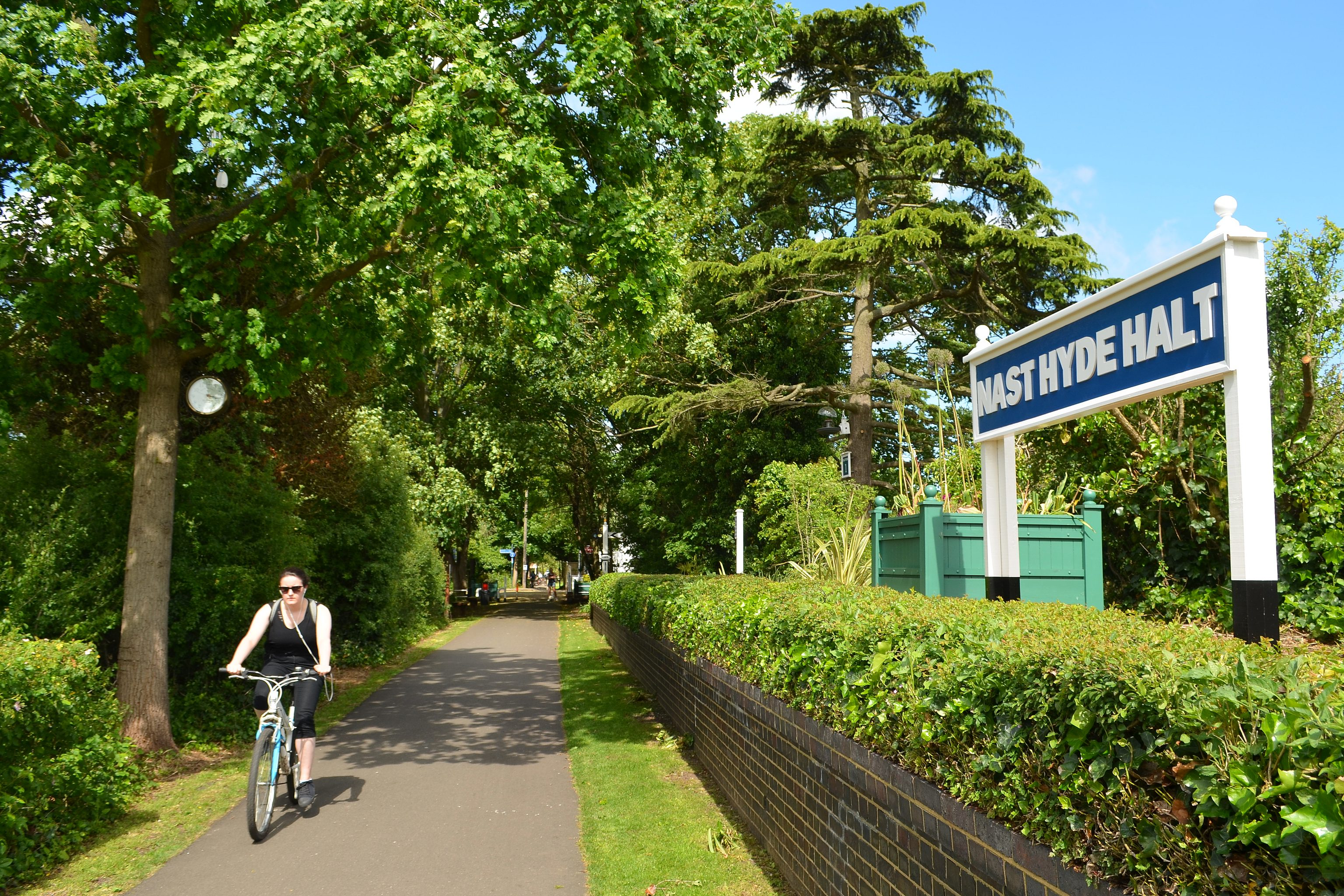
Nast Hyde Halt railway station platform

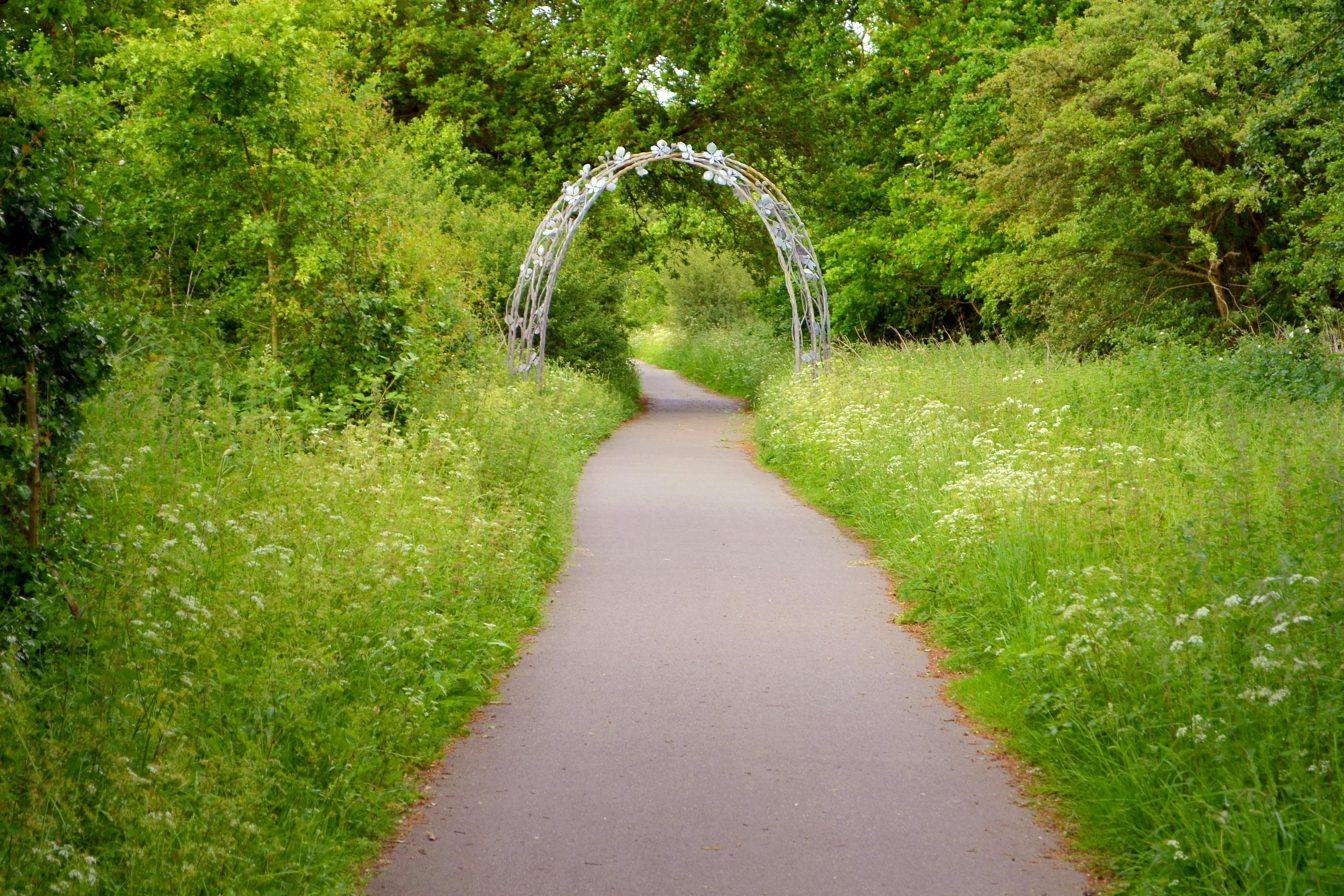
Sculptural arch on the Alban Way

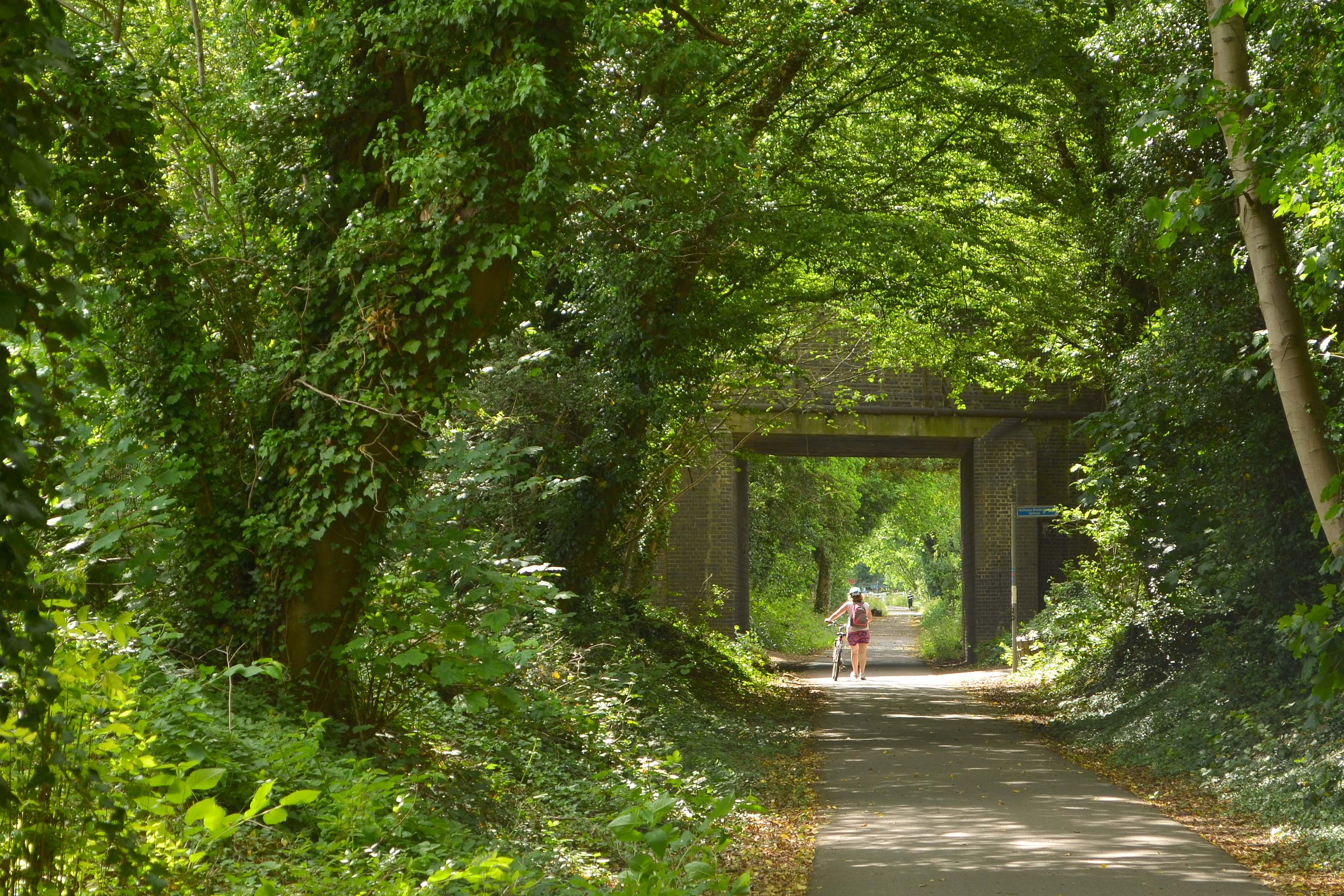
Hill End Lane bridge

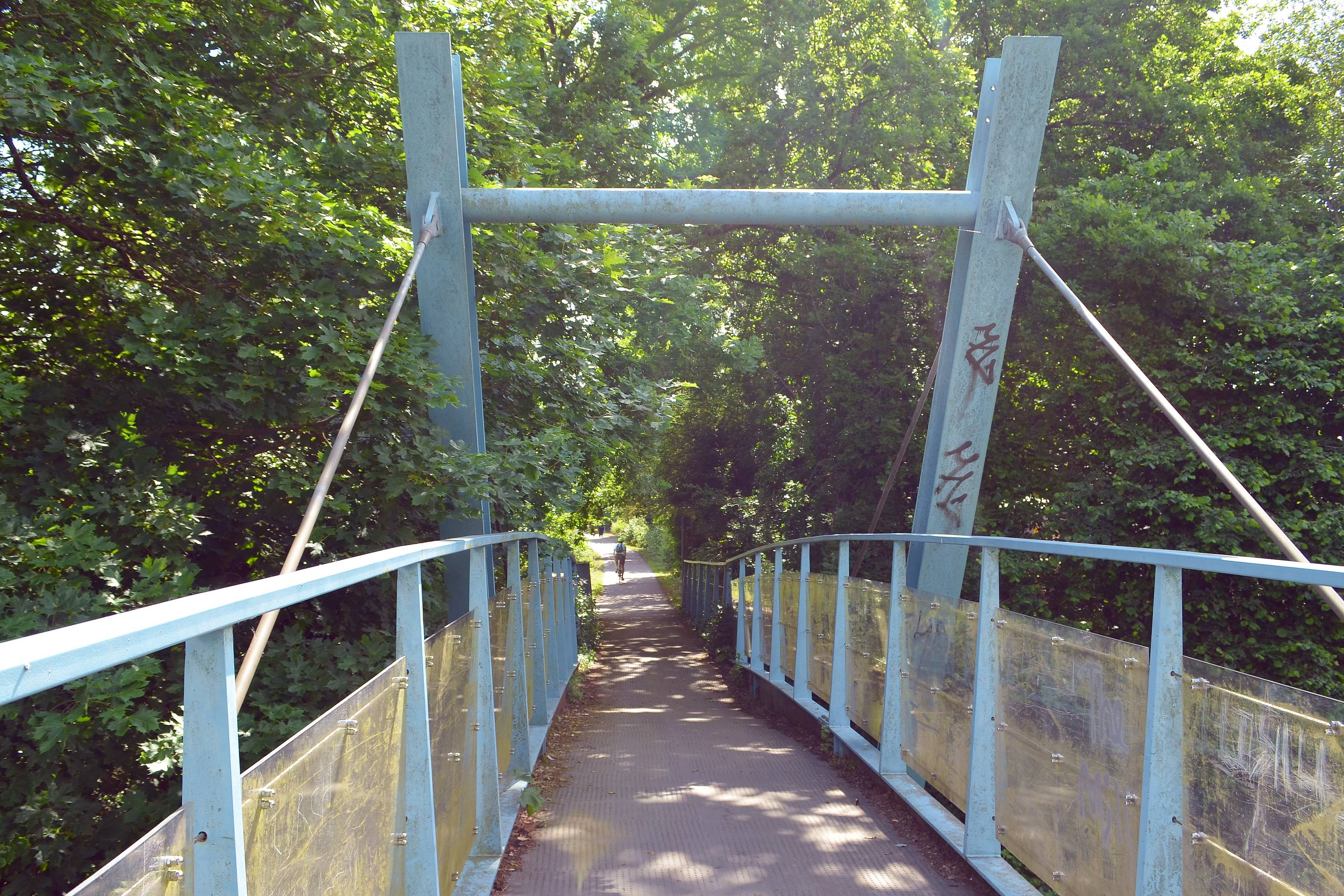
Bridge over Camp Road

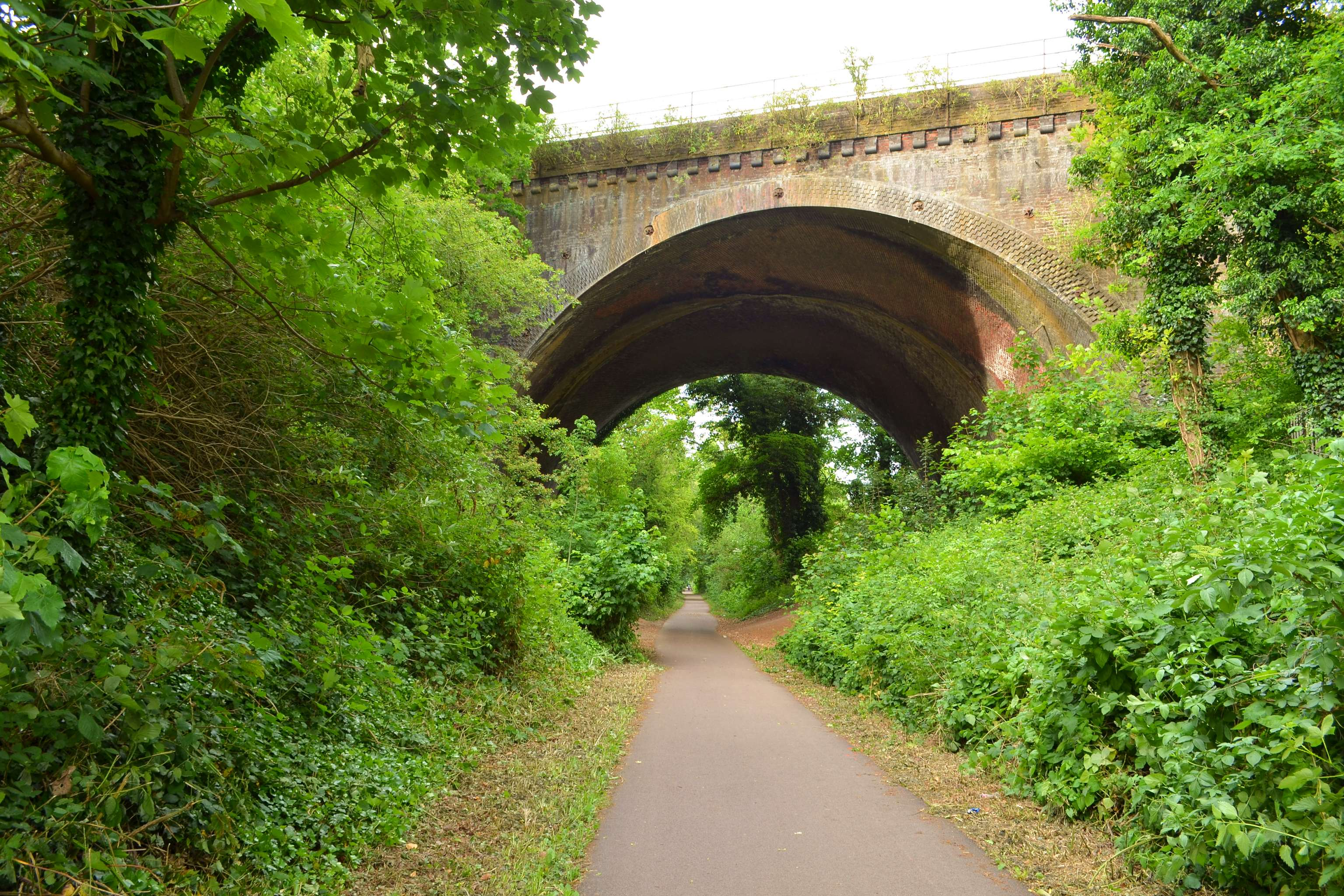
Midland Railway bridge

== See also ==
- Ayot Greenway
- Cole Green Way
