= Woodhall, Hertfordshire =

Area of Welwyn Garden City, Hertfordshire, England

Coordinates: 51.788984°N 0.205506°W

Woodhall
- Woodhall Community Centre, Woodhall, Welwyn Garden City

- Location within Hertfordshire
- District: Welwyn Hatfield
- Shire county: Hertfordshire
- Region: East
- Country: England
- Sovereign state: United Kingdom
- Post town: WELWYN GARDEN CITY
- Postcode district: AL7
- Police: Hertfordshire
- Fire: Hertfordshire
- Ambulance: East of England
- UK Parliament: Welwyn Hatfield

Woodhall is an area of Welwyn Garden City within the Welwyn Hatfield district of Hertfordshire, England. It is located to the southeast of the town centre, separated by the East Coast Main Line.

== History ==
Woodhall was little more than a rural area, within a Saxons land division. It was close to the nearby hamlet of Hatfield Hyde which is directly to the east. It would remain this way until the 1920s, when it would become part of the new town of Welwyn Garden City as a residential expansion.

== Transport ==
The area is close to Welwyn Garden City railway station. Two other additional halts near to Woodhall were both Attimore Hall Halt railway station and Hatfield Hyde Halt railway station on the former Hertford and Welwyn Junction Railway. The halts only lasted a month, closing in June 1905. Having only opened a month earlier in May 1905.

== Present day ==
The Church of Our Lady Queen of Apostles in Woodhall, Welwyn Garden City

Today, Woodhall is a residential area of the town of Welwyn Garden City with it being often mentioned alongside other neighbouring villages in the historical records for Welwyn Garden City.

It is also home to numerous parks and open spaces. Another notable building in Woodhall is the impressive Church of Our Lady Queen of Apostles church building, which was constructed between 1959 and 1960. It continues to be an active place of worship.

== See also ==
- Woodhall Park
- Hatfield Hyde
