= Woodhall =

Woodhall or Wood Hall may refer to:

== Places in the United Kingdom ==
- Woodhall, Hertfordshire, an area of Welwyn Garden City, Hertfordshire, England
- Woodhall, North Yorkshire, England, a hamlet in Askrigg parish
- Woodhall, Hemingbrough, a hamlet in Hemingbrough parish, North Yorkshire
- Woodhall, Port Glasgow, an area of Port Glasgow, Inverclyde
  - Woodhall railway station
- Old Woodhall, Lincolnshire, England, a small village
  - site of the former Woodhall Junction railway station
- Woodhall Farm, an area of Hemel Hempstead, Hertfordshire
- Wood Hall Hotel and Spa, a country house hotel near Linton, West Yorkshire
- Woodhall House, Edinburgh, Scotland, a mansion
- Woodhall Park, a country house near Watton-at-Stone, Hertfordshire
- Woodhall Spa, Lincolnshire, England, a former spa town and civil parish
  - Woodhall Spa Urban District, former local government district

== Places elsewhere ==
- Wood Hall, a community in Clarendon, Jamaica
- Wood Hall (Callaghan, Virginia), an historic home in Virginia, U.S.

== People ==
- Dale Woodhall (born 1961), Australian rules footballer
- George Woodhall (1863–1924), English footballer
- Hunter Woodhall, American Paralympic athlete
- Norrie Woodhall (1907–2011), English stage actress
- Richie Woodhall (born 1968), English boxer
- Tara Davis-Woodhall (born 1999), American athlete, Olympic Champion 2024

== See also ==
- Woodall (disambiguation)
- Woodell (disambiguation)
- Woodhull (disambiguation)
