= Hatfield Hyde =

Area of Welwyn Garden City, Hertfordshire, England

Coordinates: 51.783392°N 0.192897°W

- The Church of St Mary Magdalene, Hatfield Hyde

- Location within Hertfordshire
- District: Welwyn Hatfield
- Shire county: Hertfordshire
- Region: East
- Country: England
- Sovereign state: United Kingdom
- Post town: WELWYN GARDEN CITY
- Postcode district: AL9, AL10
- Police: Hertfordshire
- Fire: Hertfordshire
- Ambulance: East of England
- UK Parliament: Welwyn Hatfield

Hatfield Hyde is an area of Welwyn Garden City within the Welwyn Hatfield district of Hertfordshire, England. It is located to the southeast of the town centre.

== History ==
Hatfield Hyde was little more than a rural hamlet, within a Saxons land division. It would remain this way until the 1920s, when it would become part of the new town of Welwyn Garden City as a residential expansion.

James Gascoyne-Cecil, 2nd Marquess of Salisbury built a chapel in the hamlet, this was locally known as the "Mud Chapel". This building was also used as a village school.

== Transport ==
The area was briefly served by Hatfield Hyde Halt railway station on the now-defunct Hertford and Welwyn Junction Railway. The halt only lasted a month, closing in June 1905. Having only opened a month earlier in May 1905. The line remained active until it was fully closed in 1962 and the lines lifted in 1967. The route is now occupied by the Cole Green Way.

The area is served by regular buses connecting it to Welwyn Garden City, St Albans, Heathrow Airport, Stevenage, and Harlow in Essex.

== Present day ==
Today, Hatfield Hyde is now a residential area of the town of Welwyn Garden City with it being often mentioned alongside other neighbouring villages in the historical records for Welwyn Garden City.

== See also ==
- Hatfield Hyde Halt railway station
- Attimore Hall Halt railway station
- Cole Green Way
- Hertford and Welwyn Junction Railway
