= Woodhull =

Woodhull may refer to:

- Woodhull, Illinois
- Woodhull, New York
- Woodhull Lake (New York)
- Woodhull Township, Michigan
- Woodhull, Wisconsin
- Woodhull Sexual Freedom Alliance, previously known as the Woodhull Freedom Foundation
- Woodhull Medical and Mental Health Center, Brooklyn, New York

== People with the surname ==
- Abraham Woodhull (1750–1826), American spy during Revolutionary War
- Alfred Alexander Woodhull (1837–1921), US Army surgeon
- Caleb Smith Woodhull (1792–1866), Mayor of New York
- Jesse Woodhull (1735–1795), New York politician
- Kate C. Woodhull (1842–1926), American missionary physician in China
- Maxwell Van Zandt Woodhull (1843–1921), American Union brevet brigadier general
- Nathaniel Woodhull (1722–1776), New York militia general
- Victoria Woodhull (1838–1927), American suffragette

== See also ==
- Woodall (disambiguation)
- Woodell (disambiguation)
- Woodhall (disambiguation)
