= Cole Green railway station =

Former railway station in Hertfordshire, England

Coordinates: 51.7839°N 0.1377°W

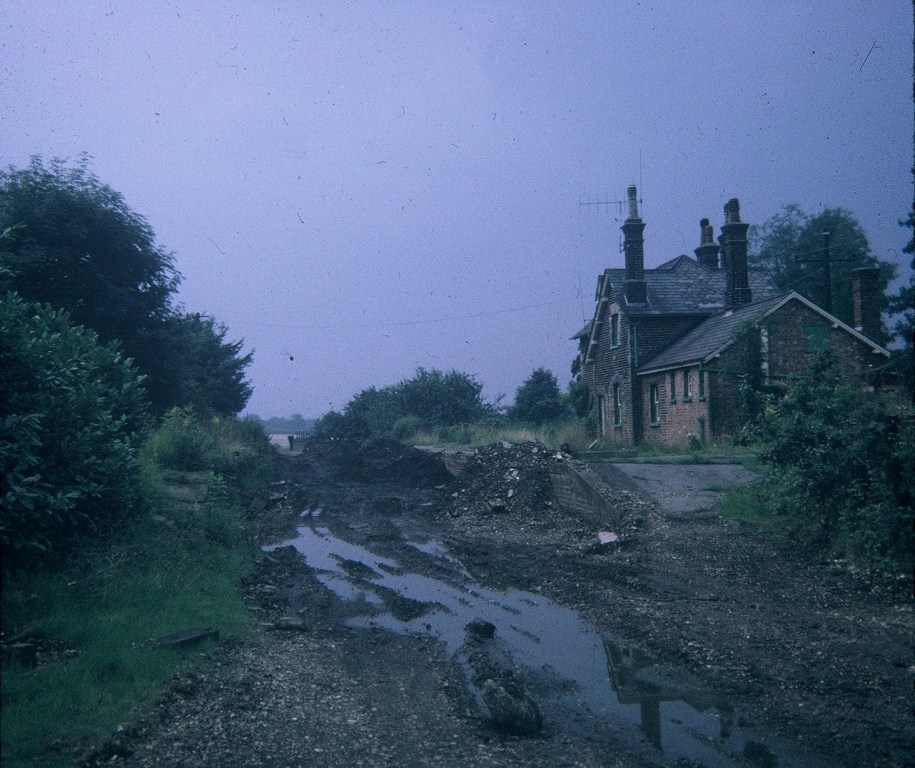
Cole Green station in 1968, prior to demolition

Cole Green railway station was a station at Cole Green, Hertfordshire, England, on the Hertford and Welwyn Junction Railway. It was a passenger station from 1858 until 18 June 1951, also serving the hamlet of Letty Green.

It is now a picnic spot on the Cole Green Way footpath and cycle trail.

The station was used in the film The Lady with a Lamp (1951). Florence Nightingale arrives at the station near her home. The train is hauled by the early steam locomotive Lion, with three four-wheeler passenger coaches, two of them named Experience and Huskisson.

Preceding station	Disused railways	Following station
Hatfield Hyde Halt	Great Northern Railway; Hertford and Welwyn Junction Railway	Hertingfordbury
