= Welwyn Garden City rail crashes =

Railway accidents in Hertfordshire, England

Three major rail crashes have occurred at, or closest to, Welwyn Garden City railway station in Hertfordshire, since its opening in 1926. In 1930, an express goods train collided with the wreckage of a coal train that had run into a stationary ballast train, with only one causalty. In 1935, a signalman's error led to a significant collision which killed 14 and injured 81, leading to a signalling change known as 'Welwyn Control'. In 1957, an express train passed multiple signals at danger and ran into the back of a slower suburban train, leading to the death of one passenger.

== 1930 crash ==
1930 Welwyn Garden City rail crash

Details
- Date: 9 December 1930; Midday
- Location: Twentieth Mile Bridge, Welwyn Garden City, Hertfordshire
- Coordinates: 51.7938°N 0.2073°W
- Line: East Coast Main Line
- Operator: London and North Eastern Railway
- Cause: Collision in low visiblity

Statistics
- Trains: 3
- Passengers: 0 (only goods trains)
- Deaths: 0
- Injured: 1

On 9 December 1930, a coal train, hauled by a Class O1 2-8-0 heading southbound ran into the back of a ballast train sitting stationary on the up goods line; the driver of the coal train could not see the stationary train due to dense fog. The wreckage covered the other up (southbound) lines. An express goods train, hauled by a Class K3 2-6-0, ran into the wreckage, after which all the lines were blocked by debris except the reversible for Hertford, Luton and Dunstable Railway services to Luton. There were no fatalities, and the only injury was to a guard.

== 1935 crash ==
1935 Welwyn Garden City rail crash
- The track diagram of Welwyn Garden City at the time, showing the two derailed trains

Details
- Date: 15 June 1935; 23:27
- Location: Welwyn Garden City, Hertfordshire
- Coordinates: 51.8032°N 0.2025°W
- Line: East Coast Main Line
- Operator: London and North Eastern Railway
- Cause: Signalling error

Statistics
- Trains: 2
- Passengers: 337
- Deaths: 14
- Injured: 81

The telegraph layout at Welwyn Garden City signal box in 1935, showing the complexity of operation

On 15 June 1935, a train from London King's Cross to Leeds collided with the rear of a train from Kings Cross to Newcastle at night. Fourteen people were killed and 81 injured, 29 seriously.

The accident was a caused by a signalman's error: the signalman at Welwyn Garden City, who had been fairly recently appointed to the box, became confused and accepted a second train into a block section that was already occupied. The Newcastle train, arriving first, received a signal check and was slowed to 15–20 mph (24–32 km/h); the Leeds train, consisting of 11 coaches hauled by Class K3 2-6-0 No 4009, ran into it at approximately 65 mph (105 km/h). The force of the collision was exacarbated by the fact that the Newcastle train had been slowed unecessarily, and Rolt commented that "no rolling stock on earth could have withstood the fury of that onslaught". No passenger in the rear coach of the Newcastle train survived, as it was completely destroyed.

The accident report concluded that the modern rolling stock with buckeye couplings withstood the violent collision well for its force; older coaches would have been crushed, with much heavier loss of life. Secondly, the Inspecting Officer felt that the signalman had been promoted beyond his level of competence for such a busy box, and that the assessment and training procedures for signalmen should be improved. Different commentators have disagreed on this; Rolt and Hamilton supported the Inspector; Vaughan felt the signalman had had insufficient time to become fully experienced in working the box. Thirdly, the Inspector recommended that the block instruments should be linked to the track circuits to prevent future occurrences in such a way that a "Line clear" indication could only be given on the block instrument if the track circuits had registered passage of a train; this was widely adopted and became known as 'Welwyn Control'.

1957 Welwyn Garden City rail crash
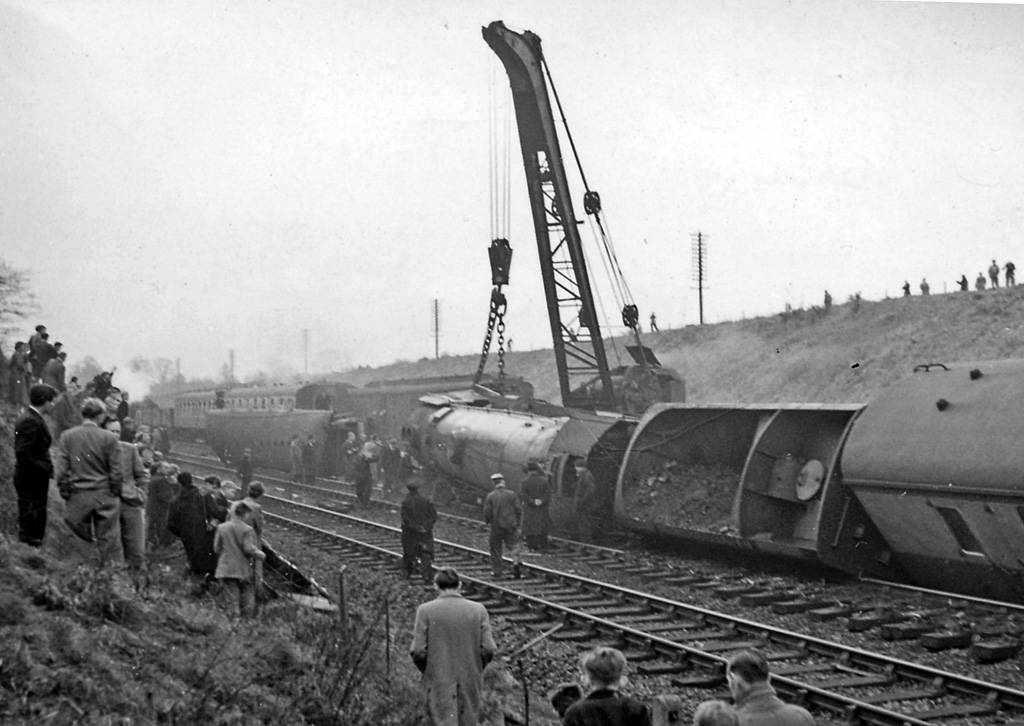
- The wreckage of the crash

Details
- Date: 7 January 1957
- Location: Welwyn Garden City, Hertfordshire
- Coordinates: 51.7981°N 0.2049°W
- Line: East Coast Main Line
- Operator: Eastern Region of British Railways
- Cause: The express train passed multiple sets of signals at danger

Statistics
- Trains: 2
- Deaths: 1
- Injured: 44

== 1957 crash ==
Diagram of the crash

There was another rear-end collision, about half a mile south of Welwyn Garden City station, at dawn on 7 January 1957, with a different cause. The accident was due to the driver of an Aberdeen to London express, hauled by a Class A2 4-6-2 passing three sets of signals at danger due to mist reducing visibility, and not hearing the explosion of emergency detonators as his locomotive ran over them.

The express was travelling at around 60–65 mph (97–105 km/h) when it collided with the rear of a local train, which had just pulled away from the station and was travelling at around 30–35 mph (48–56 km/h). The rear coach of the local train was wrecked in the collision and two more were overturned. One passenger in the local train was killed and 44 people were injured, 26 of them (including the driver of the express train) seriously. The locomotive of the express overturned, and the driver suffered severe shock.

== See also ==
- Lists of rail accidents
