= Hatfield Hyde Halt railway station =

Former railway station in Welwyn Garden City, Hertfordshire, England

Hatfield Hyde Halt
- The former Cross Keepers Cottage near the site of Hatfield Hyde Halt station

General information
- Location: Hatfield Hyde, Welwyn Garden City, Hertfordshire; England
- Platforms: 1

Other information
- Status: Disused

History
- Original company: Great Northern Railway
- Pre-grouping: Great Northern Railway

Key dates
- May 1905: Station opens as Hatfield Hyde Halt
- 1 July 1905: Hatfield Hyde Halt closes
Location

Hatfield Hyde Halt was a short-lived railway station on the Hertford and Welwyn Junction Railway. It served the Hatfield Hyde area of Welwyn Garden City in Hertfordshire, England.

== History ==
The station was built as part of the Great Northern Railway; it was built at the same time as the nearby Attimore Hall Halt. They both were opened in May 1905, and they both closed, for lack of use, on 1 July 1905. Both were only open for just over a month.

== Present day ==
Today, the site of the halt and trackbed form part of what is now the Cole Green Way.

== Route ==
Preceding station	Disused railways	Following station
Attimore Hall Halt	Great Northern Railway; Hertford and Welwyn Junction Railway	Cole Green

== See also ==
- Hatfield Hyde
- List of closed railway stations in Britain
- Great Northern Railway (Great Britain)
