= Hertingfordbury =

Village in Hertfordshire, England

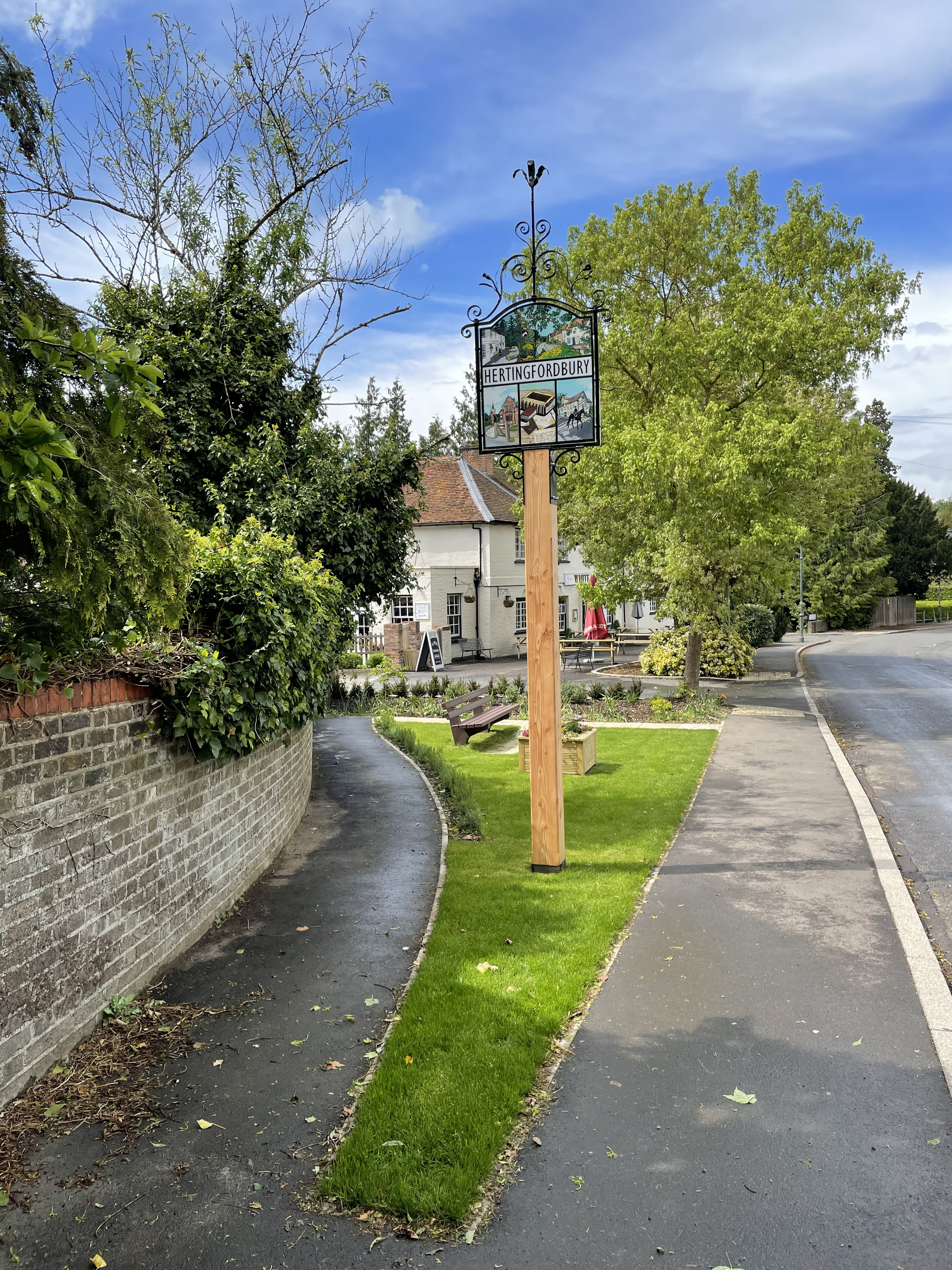

- Location within Hertfordshire
- Population: 688 (Parish, 2021)
  - Density: 61.92/km²
- OS grid reference: TL307120
- Civil parish: Hertford; Hertingfordbury
- District: East Hertfordshire
- Shire county: Hertfordshire
- Region: East
- Country: England
- Sovereign state: United Kingdom
- Post town: Hertford
- Postcode district: SG14
- Dialling code: 01992
- Police: Hertfordshire
- Fire: Hertfordshire
- Ambulance: East of England
- UK Parliament: Hertford and Stortford

Hertingfordbury is a village in on the western outskirts of the town of Hertford, in the East Hertfordshire district of Hertfordshire, England. It was mentioned in the Domesday Book of 1086. The village also gives its name to a civil parish, which covers the rural area to the west of the village. The village itself is no longer part of the civil parish, having been removed from the parish in 1935 and transferred to the parish of Hertford. Hertingfordbury village is now also classed as part of the Hertford built up area by the Office for National Statistics. The main settlements in the civil parish of Hertingfordbury are Birch Green, Cole Green, East End Green, Letty Green, and Staines Green. At the 2021 census the civil parish had a population of 688.

== Location ==
Hertingfordbury lies one mile west of Hertford on the A414 road. Ribbon development along that road has yet to reach the village, which retains a rural character. The village straddles the River Mimram, on which was built a water mill in the 18th century, and lies just north of the River Lea. The northern boundary of the village is Panshanger Park, with its Great Oak, considered by some to be the oldest oak in England. It is situated within the Castle ward of Hertford Town Council, the London metropolitan green belt and is a named conservation area of East Herts District Council.

Although Hertingfordbury civil parish does not include the village, it does contain five smaller villages known as the "five greens". They are Birch Green, Cole Green, East End Green, Letty Green and Staines Green. Letty Green, to the west, has a grade II listed deconsecrated St John's Church. Between the villages are the hamlets of Cumberland Green, Labby Green and Pipers End.

== Domesday Book ==
The village was mentioned in the Domesday Book of 1086 as Hertfordingberie, meaning "Stronghold of the people of Hertford":

Ralph himself holds Hertfordingberie. It is assessed at 5 hides. There is land for 10 ploughs. In demesne are 3 hides and 1 virgate, and there are 2 ploughs, and there can be a third. There 5 villans with 1 Frenchman and 6 bordars have 5 ploughs, and there can be 2 more. There are 11 cottars and 4 slaves, and 2 mills rendering 6s, meadow for 3 ploughs, pasture for the livestock of the vill and woodland for 200 pigs. From woodland pasture, 7s. In all it is worth £8; when received, £6; TRE £10. Alwine, a thegn of Earl Harold, held this manor and could sell.

== St Mary's Church ==
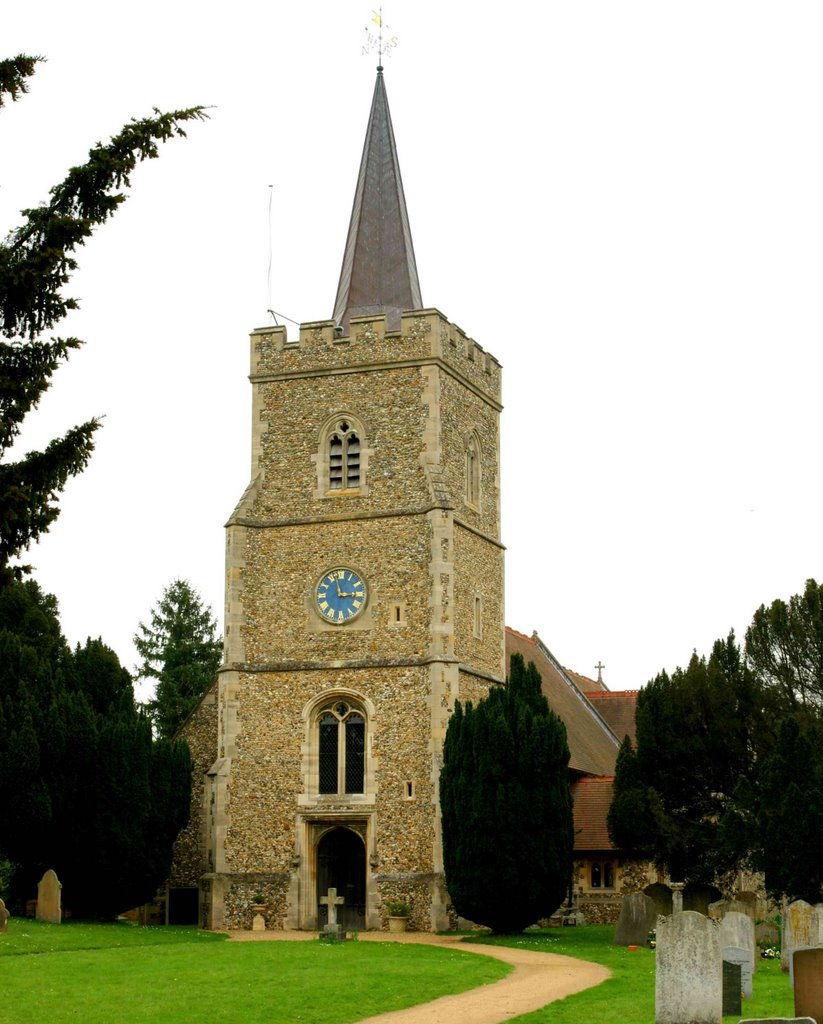
St. Mary's Church, Hertingfordbury

St. Mary's Church is situated on rising ground to the east of the village, overlooking the water meadows that lead down to the River Mimram. A church seems to have stood on this spot as early as the 13th century. Construction is mainly of local flints with stone dressing, and the roof is tiled. Extensive alterations and restorations were carried out in 1845 and 1890. Inside the church is some interesting alabaster work, including the pulpit, and oak carvings by a native of Oberammergau. The churchyard contains the unmarked grave of Jane Wenham, erroneously believed to be the last person to be sentenced to death for witchcraft in England. She was condemned by a Hertford court in 1712 but was given a reprieve from the death sentence and later granted a Royal pardon by Queen Anne. Originally from Walkern her cause was adopted by William Cowper, 1st Earl Cowper, and she lived out her days in a cottage on his land at Panshanger Park. Also buried in the churchyard are members of the Cowper family, and, under the yew tree by the west door, Benjamin Truman, owner of the Truman Brewery in the 18th century, which was at one time the biggest brewery in the world. The Camden Town Group artist, Spencer Gore, whose mother lived in Hertingfordbury, was buried in the churchyard, after dying in Richmond. An American heiress, Pauline Payne Whitney, who had married Lord Queenborough, is buried there as is their daughter, Dorothy Paget, a racehorse owner, whose horses won the Cheltenham Gold Cup seven times and the Champion Hurdle four. Her funeral procession included a string of race horses, whose jockeys included Gordon Richards.

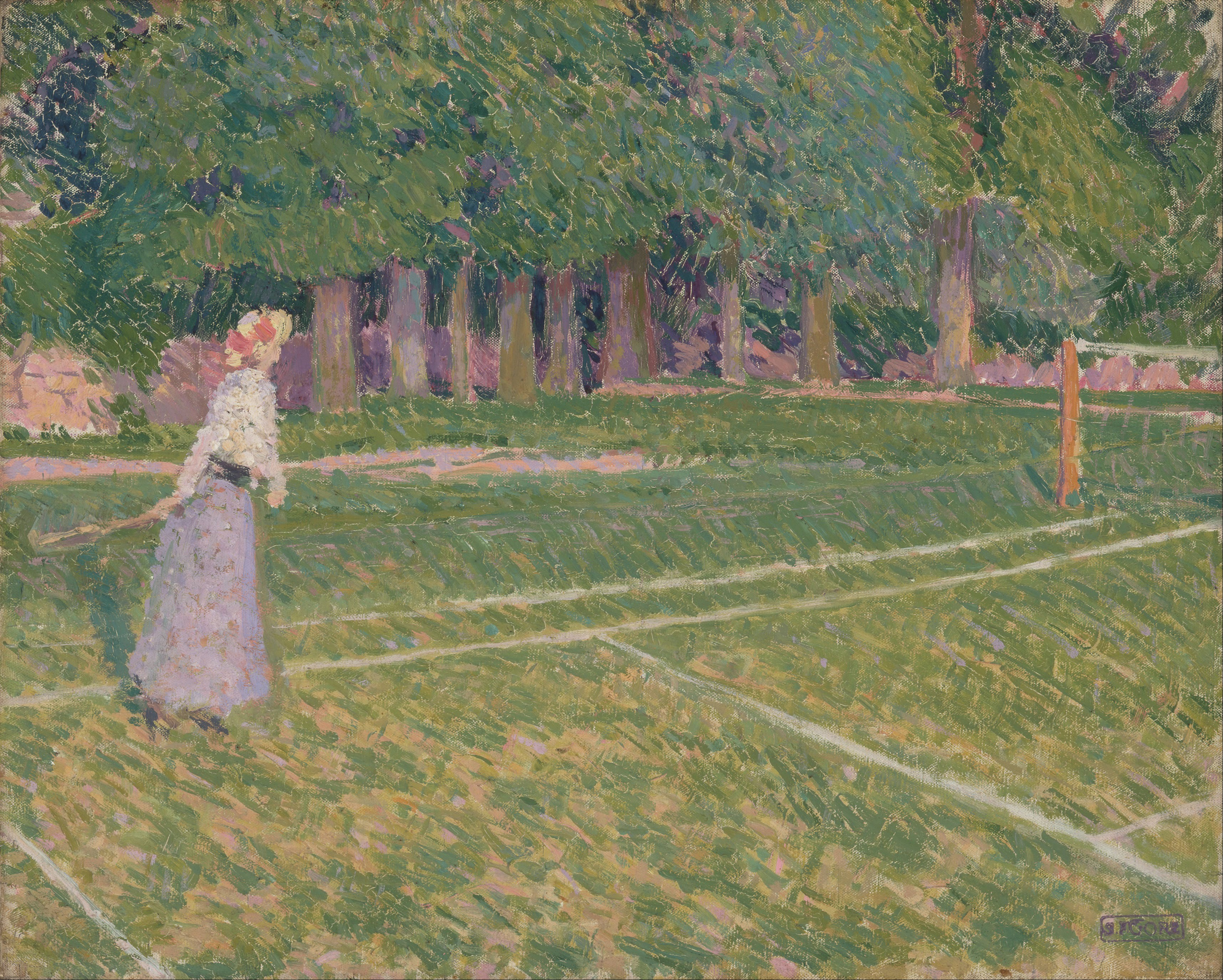
Tennis at Hertingfordbury, by Spencer Gore who is buried in the churchyard

== The village ==
Both Hertingfordbury Park, former residence of the Cowper family, and Hertford Prep, a private primary school, stand to the east of St. Mary's. Houses in the village include "Epcombs", a Georgian brick house and "Amores", which stands in a triangle in the centre of the village and is over 500 years old. A little to the south of the main village is "Roxford House" on St. Mary's Lane, a Grade II Listed Building, where Austrian composer Joseph Haydn stayed for the summer of 1791. The White Horse is a 15th-century Georgian-fronted building that in the past was a staging post for the Reading to Cambridge coach. To the north-east of the church is the Old Rectory, formerly home of the Addis family, descendants of William Addis, inventor of the first mass-produced toothbrush. There was an Addis brush factory in Hertford from 1920 to the 1990s.

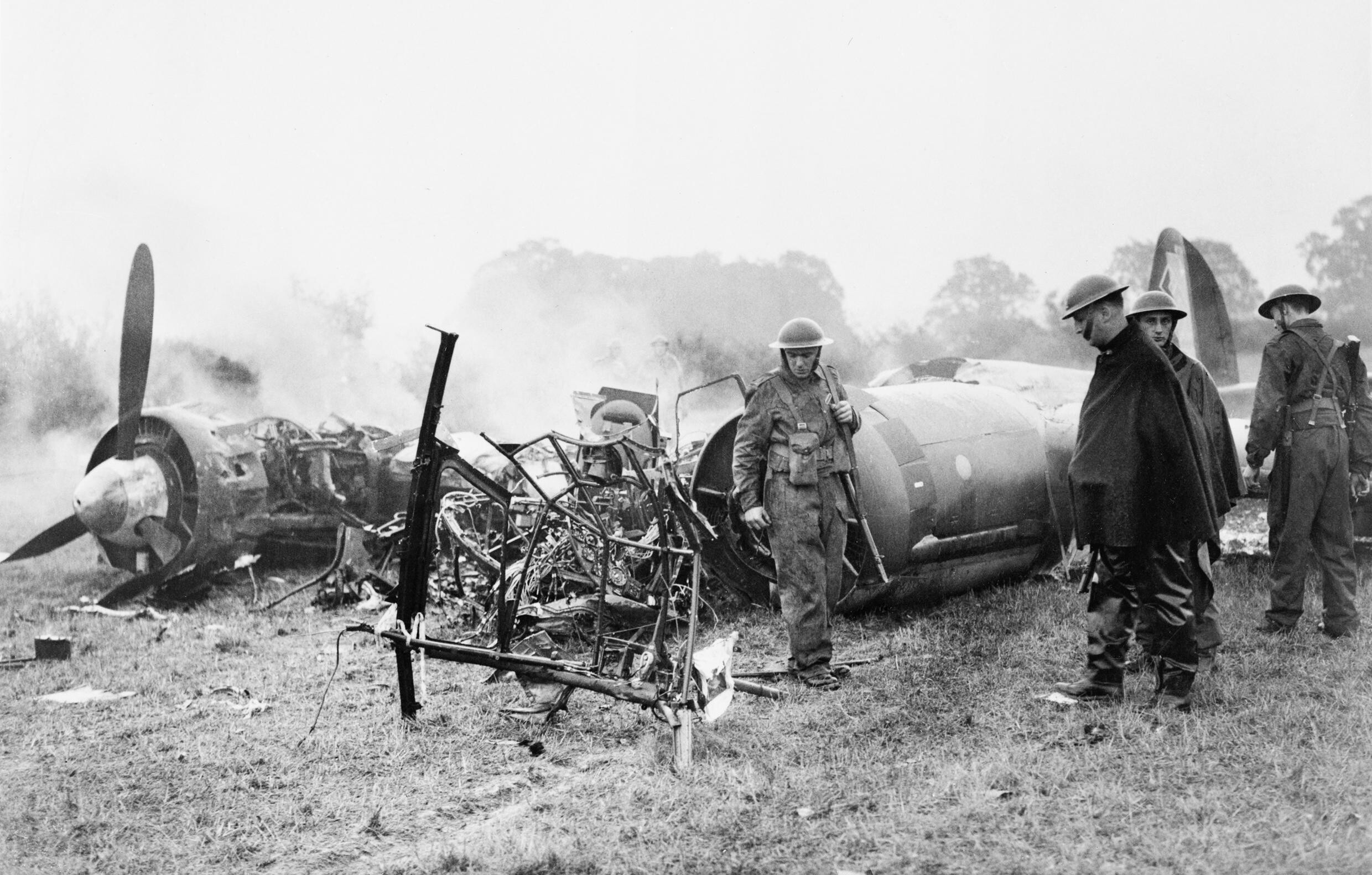
Junkers Ju 88 (W.Nr. 4136: 3Z+BB) of I/KG 77, which crashed at Hertingfordbury, on 3 October 1940

Mayflower Place was commissioned by Countess Cowper and built in 1910. It was originally for the workers and their families from the Panshanger Estate. It is now owned by the East Herts Lodge of Freemasons.

A by-pass was constructed in 1974. Since then the village has changed in character and now provides homes for those who commute daily to London rather than for farm workers.

Hertingfordbury was formerly served by Hertingfordbury railway station on the Hertford to Hatfield line. This was built for the Hertford & Welwyn Junction Railway and appeared in passenger timetables by 1858. Passenger services ceased in 1951 and the line eventually fell victim to the Beeching Axe when goods traffic ceased in 1966. The station was the setting for scenes in the 1936 film When Knights Were Bold, and an ITV children's TV programme, Catweazle in 1970. It has now been converted into a residence. The disused railway line is now the Cole Green Way, popular with walkers, riders and cyclists.

Hertingfordbury Cricket Club plays at the recreation ground as does Hertingfordbury Tennis Club, which was formed at a public meeting in 1961. There is an annual fete on the third Saturday in June to raise funds for the upkeep of the recreation ground.

== Governance ==
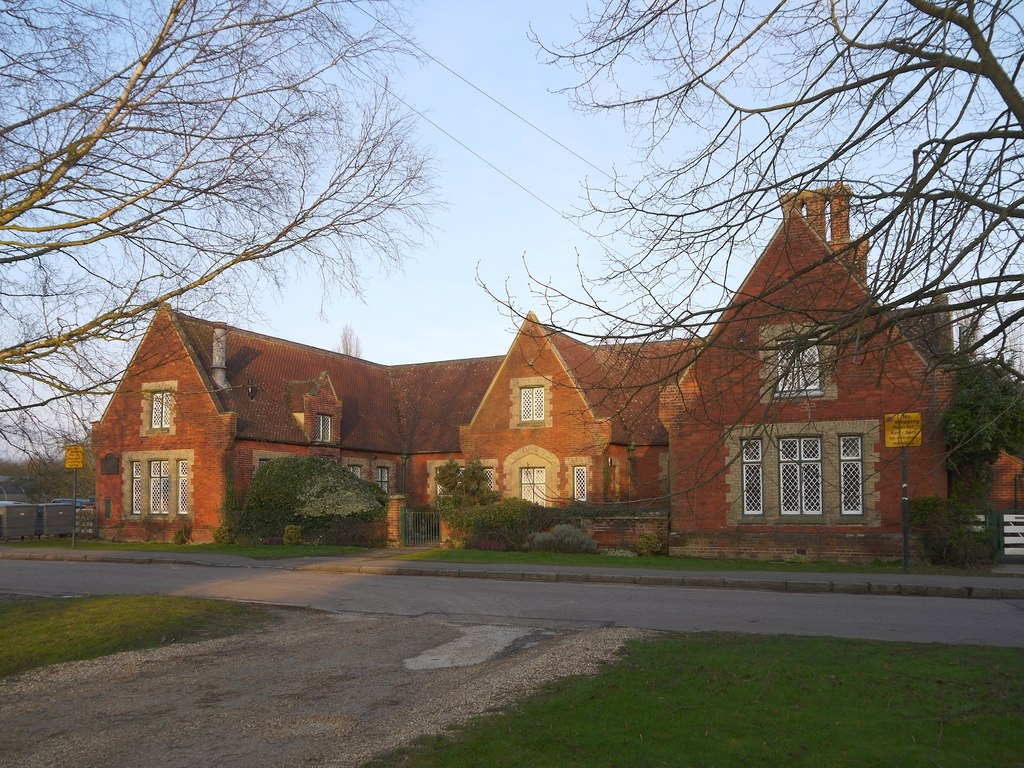
Hertingfordbury Cowper Primary School, Birch Green: Also serves as place of Hertingfordbury Parish Council

There are three tiers of local government covering the civil parish of Hertingfordbury, at parish, district, and county level: Hertingfordbury Parish Council, East Hertfordshire District Council, and Hertfordshire County Council. The parish council generally meets at the Hertingfordbury Cowper Primary School in Birch Green.

Hertingfordbury village does not form part of the civil parish of Hertingfordbury, but is included in the Hertford Castle ward of the parish of Hertford, administered by Hertford Town Council. Hertingfordbury village is also classed as part of the Hertford built up area by the Office for National Statistics.

=== Administrative history ===
Hertingfordbury was an ancient parish in the Hertford Hundred of Hertfordshire. When elected parish and district councils were established in 1894, the parish was included in the Hertford Rural District. The parish was enlarged in 1924 to take in the area of the abolished St Andrew Rural parish, which had been created in 1894 from the parts of the old parish of Hertford St Andrew which lay outside Hertford's borough boundaries. The added area included most of the Panshanger estate and adjoining areas along Welwyn Road. In 1935, the boundaries were adjusted again. Eastern parts of the parish, including the village itself and the area to the north where the Sele Farm estate has since been built, were transferred to the parish of Hertford, since when the civil parish of Hertingfordbury has not included the village after which it is named.

Although the village no longer forms part of the civil parish of Hertingfordbury, it remains part of the Church of England ecclesiastical parish.
