= Howard Centre =

Coordinates: 51°48′03″N 0°12′16″W

The Howard Centre

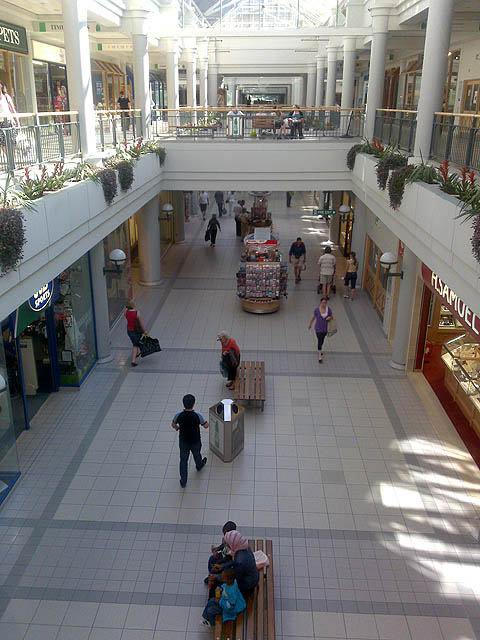
- The Howard Centre
- Location: Welwyn Garden City, Hertfordshire
- Opened: October 1990; 36 years ago
- Developer: Segro
- Manager: Segro (1990-2004); Landsec (2004-2009); LaSalle (2009-present)
- Num. of stores: 50 (approx.)
- Num. of anchor tenants: 4
- Floor area: 230,000 sq ft (21,000 m^{2})
- Floors: 2
- Parking: 725 cars
- Website: howardcentre.co.uk

The Howard Centre is a shopping centre in Welwyn Garden City. It is named after Sir Ebenezer Howard, founder of the garden city movement.

== History ==
The centre was built by Tarmac Construction and opened in October 1990. It was owned and managed by Segro from 1990 until 2004 when ownership transferred to Landsec. Landsec managed the centre until its disposal in October 2009 to LaSalle who have owned and managed it since.

== Description ==
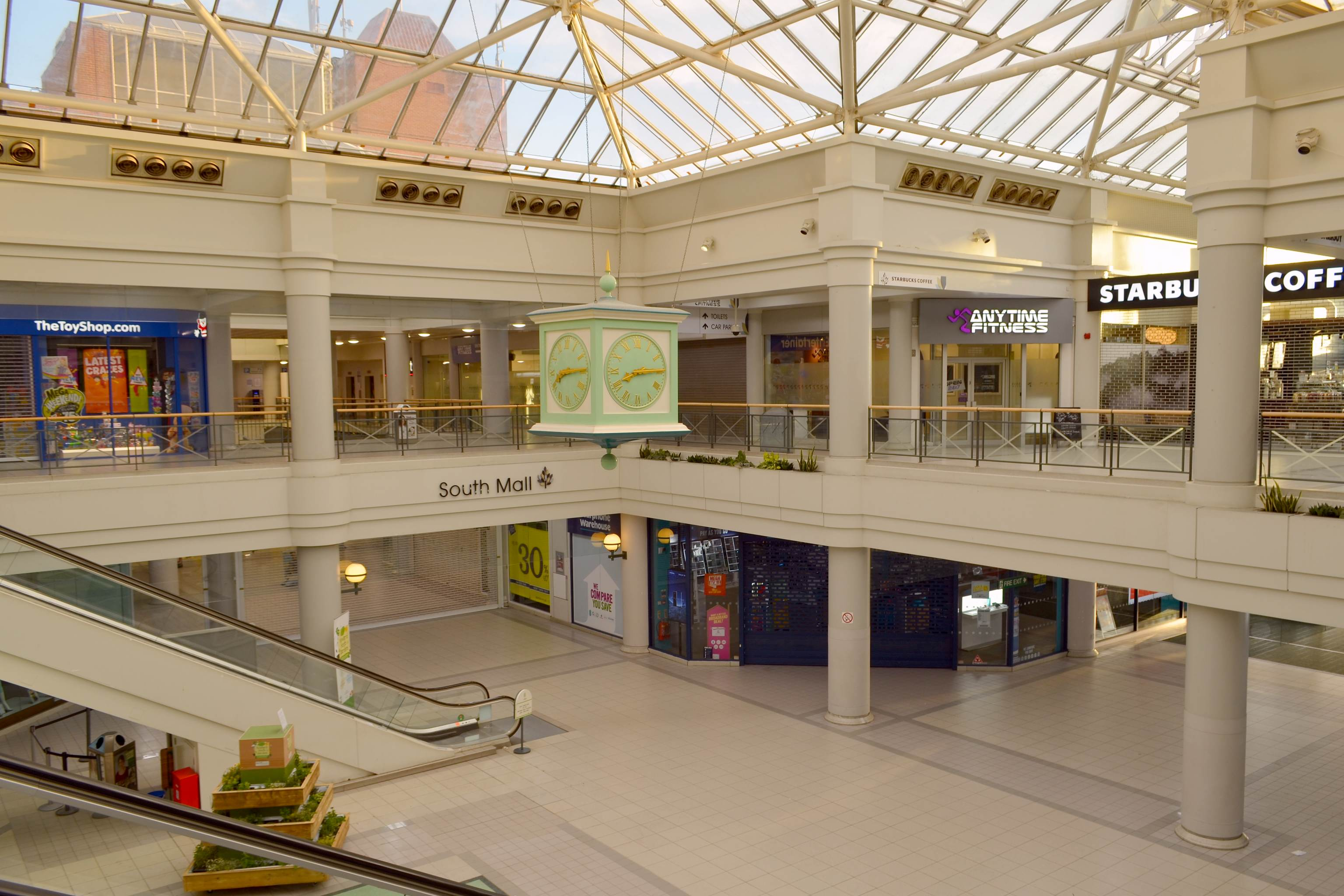
The Howard Centre atrium in May 2017

The centre provides 230,000 sq ft (21,000 m^{2}) of space set across two levels; anchor tenants include Boots, WHSmith, Monsoon and H&M. In April 2022, the then largest anchor store Marks & Spencer (occupying 84,000 sq ft (7,800 m^{2}) split across both floors at the centre's northern end) closed their Howard Centre branch and relocated to Stevenage.

== See also ==
- Ebenezer Howard
- Welwyn Garden City
- Garden city movement
- Welwyn Garden City railway station
- LaSalle
