= Attimore Hall Halt railway station =

Disused railway station in Welwyn Garden City, Hertfordshire, England

Coordinates: 51.7974°N 0.1809°W

Attimore Hall Halt
- Site of Attimore Hall Halt

General information
- Location: Welwyn Garden City, Hertfordshire; England
- Platforms: 1

Other information
- Status: Disused

History
- Original company: Great Northern Railway

Key dates
- May 1905: Station opens as Attimore Hall Halt
- 1 July 1905: Closed for passengers
- 4 May 1964: closed for goods
Location

Attimore Hall Halt was a halt station on the Great Northern Railway in Hertfordshire, England. The station was built near what is now the town of Welwyn Garden City, which would be established in 1920, after the station closed. It was on the Hertford and Welwyn Junction Railway.

== History ==
The station opened to the public in May 1905, although it was a quiet station, which resulted in the closure one month later. The station was demolished.

== Present day ==
Today, the site of the halt forms part of the Cole Green Way.

== Route ==
| Preceding station | Disused railways | Following station |
|---|---|---|
| Welwyn Junction | Great Northern Railway; Hertford and Welwyn Junction Railway | Hatfield Hyde Halt |

== See also ==
- List of closed railway stations in Britain
