= Hertingfordbury railway station =

Former railway station in Hertfordshire, England

Coordinates: 51.7886°N 0.1017°W

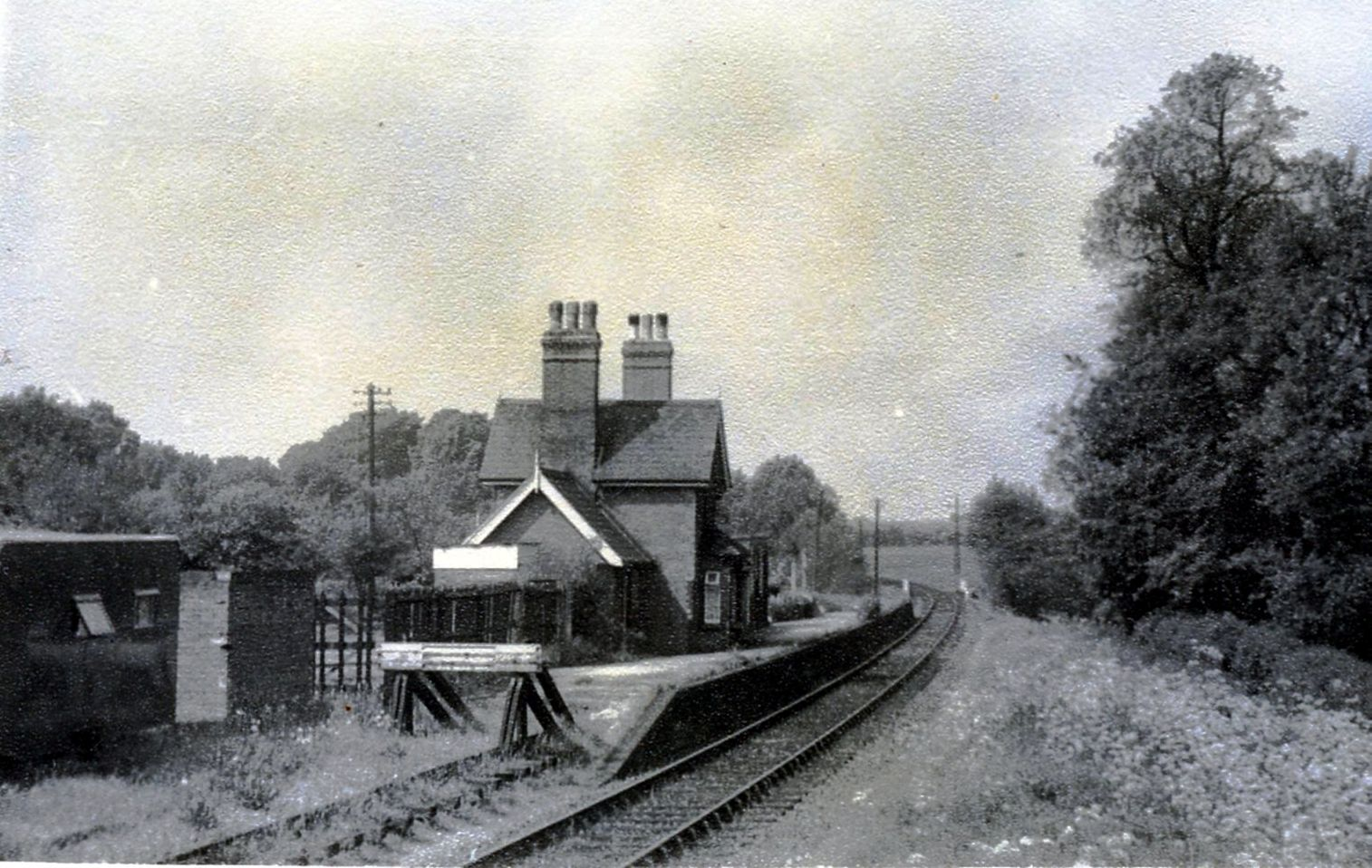
Station building and platform, looking west, taken 1953

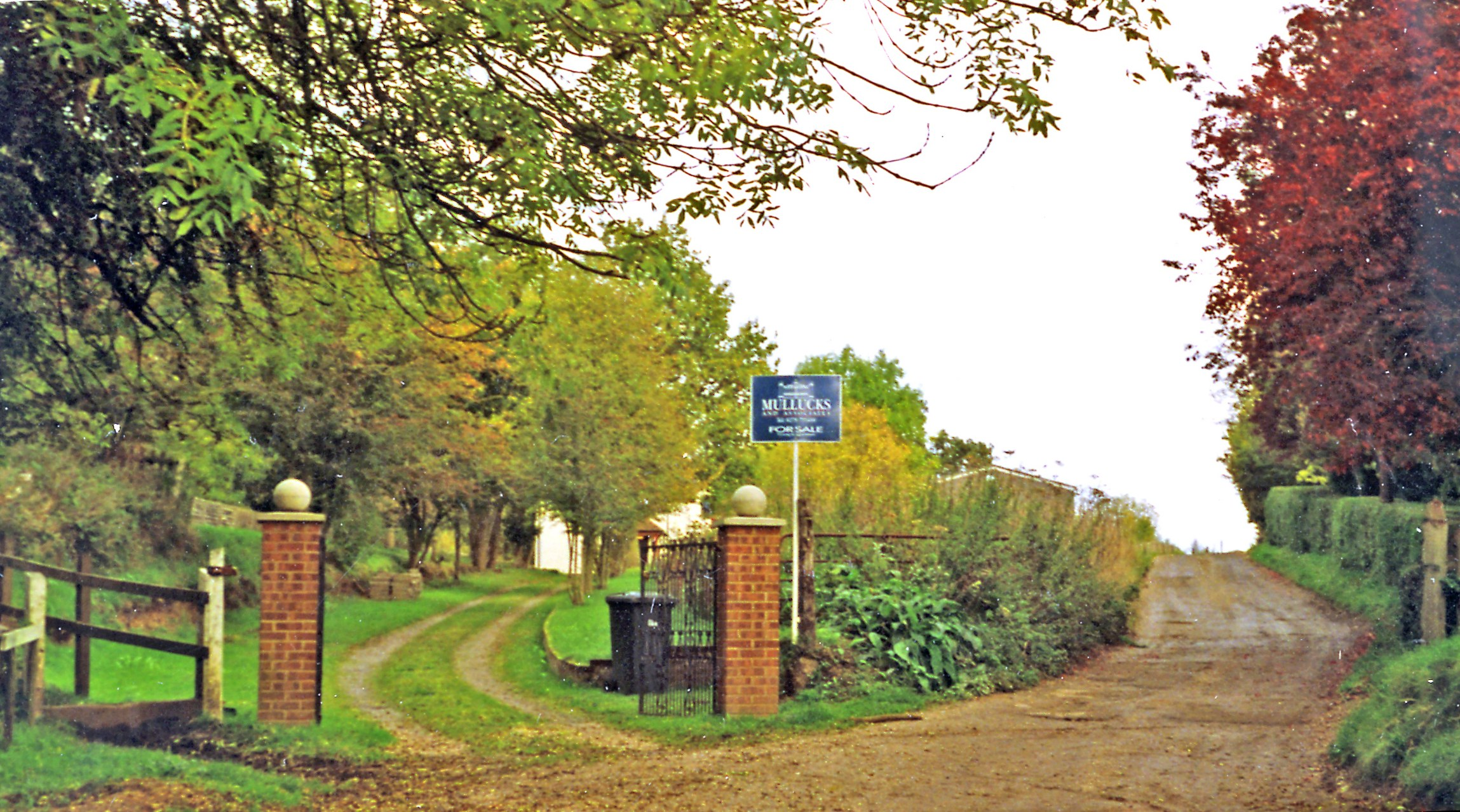
Site of the former station, seen in 1993

Hertingfordbury railway station was a station at Hertingfordbury, Hertfordshire, England, on the Hertford and Welwyn Junction Railway. It was a passenger station from December 1858 until 18 June 1951. It had a single platform and a small goods yard to the east. The line was finally closed to all traffic in 1962.

The station building has been converted to a private residence, with the old line open as a public right of way, named the Cole Green Way.

Preceding station	Disused railways	Following station
Cole Green	Great Northern Railway; Hertford and Welwyn Junction Railway	Hertford Cowbridge
