= Hertford Cowbridge railway station =

Former railway station in England

Coordinates: 51.7993°N 0.0809°W

Hertford Cowbridge
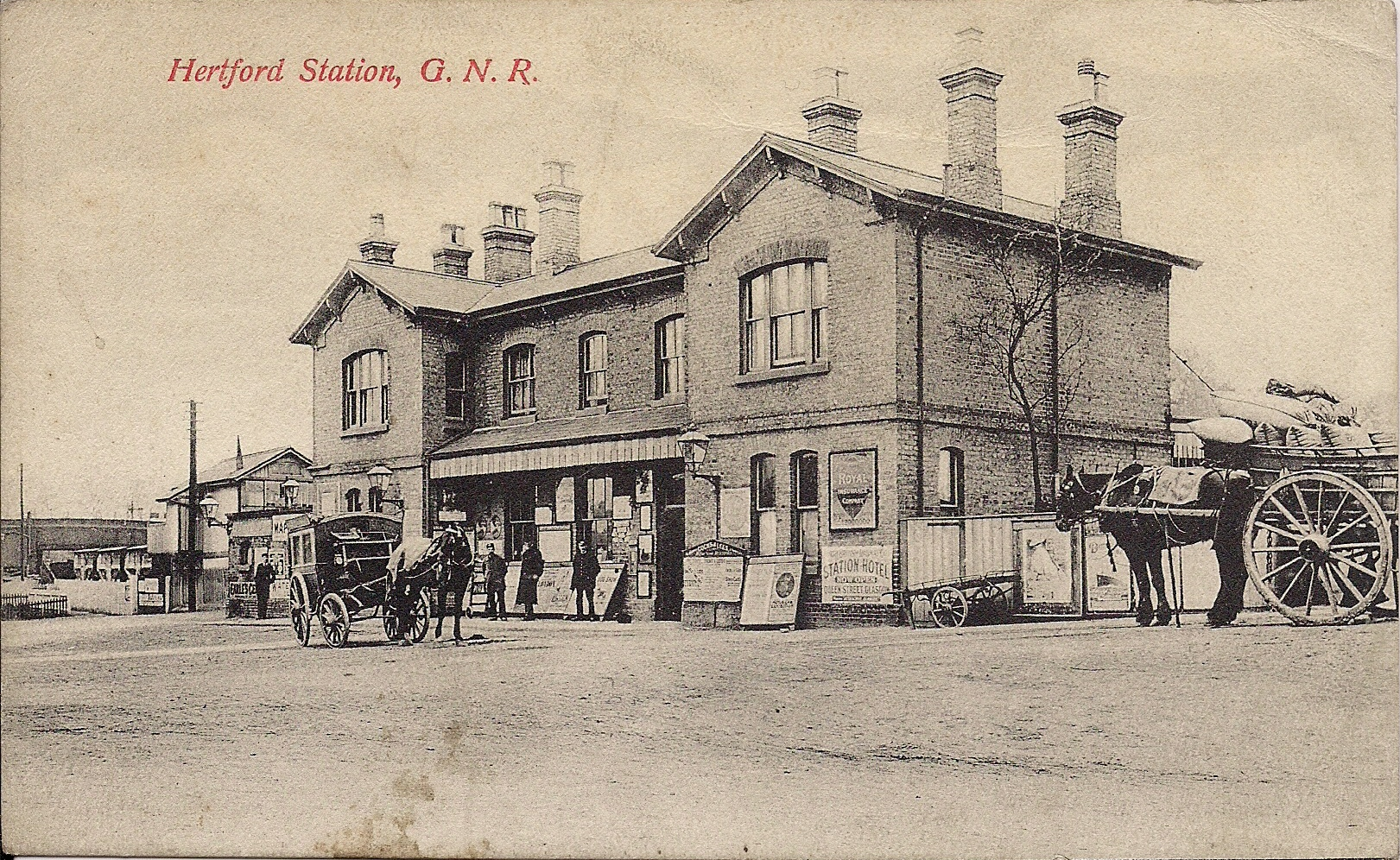

General information
- Location: Hertford, East Hertfordshire; England
- Grid reference: TL324129

Other information
- Status: Disused

History
- Original company: Hertford and Welwyn Junction Railway
- Pre-grouping: Great Northern Railway
- Post-grouping: London and North Eastern Railway

Key dates
- 1 March 1858: Station opened as Hertford Cowbridge
- 1 July 1923: Renamed Hertford North
- 2 June 1924: Station closed
Location

Hertford Cowbridge railway station was a station on the Hertford and Welwyn Junction Railway, and was situated in Hertford, England.

== History ==
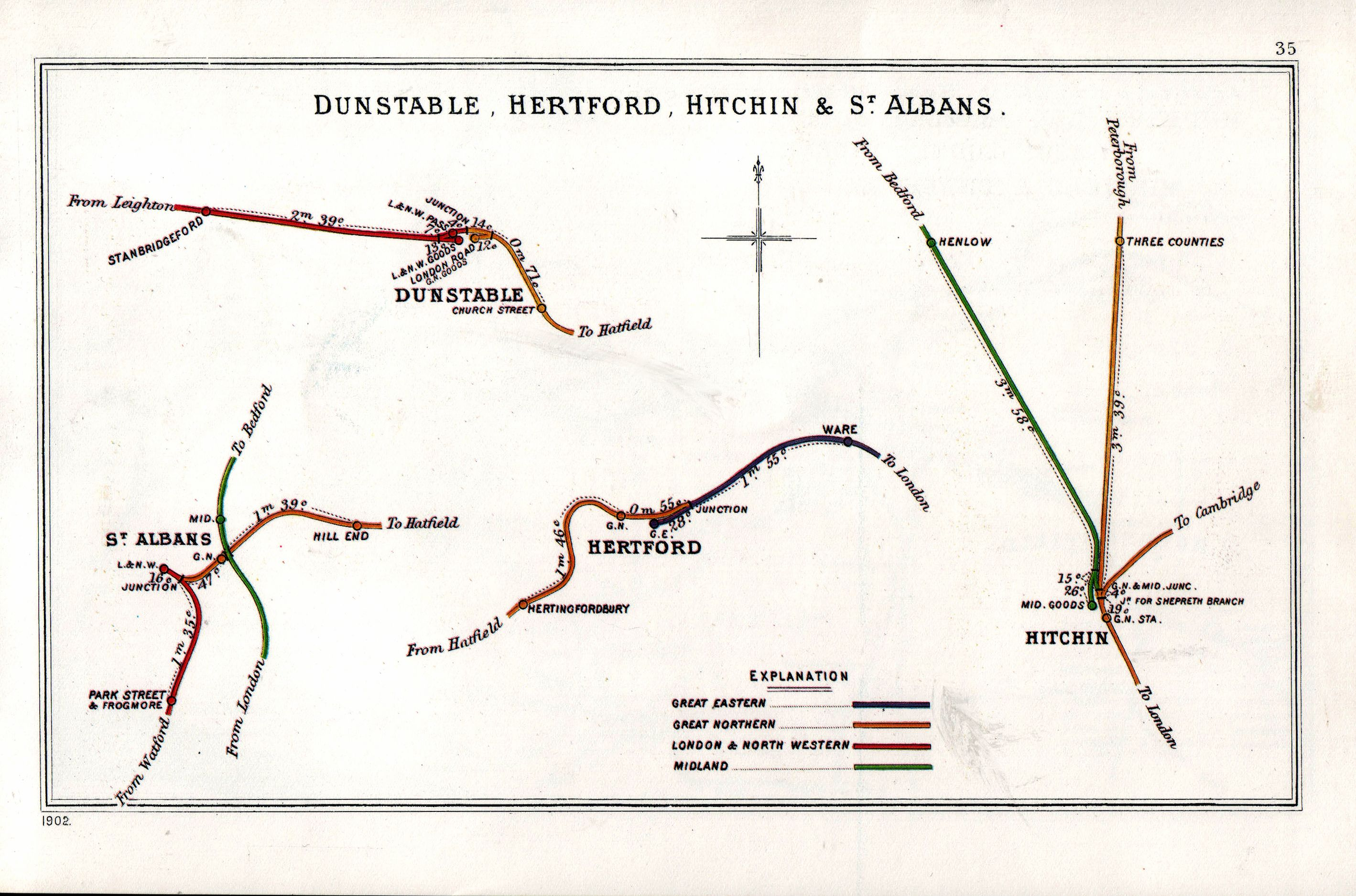
A 1902 Railway Clearing House map of railways in the vicinity of Hertford Cowbridge (centre, shown here in orange as G.N.)

The station was opened on 1 March 1858, originally being named Hertford Cowbridge. It was situated on the branch from Hatfield, between Hertingfordbury and a junction with the Great Eastern Railway just to the east of their Hertford station.

On 1 July 1923, the station was renamed Hertford North, but did not last long under that name. When the Hertford Loop Line opened on 2 June 1924, a new Hertford North station was opened on that line, the old one being closed the same day.

== Route ==
Preceding station	Disused railways	Following station
Hertingfordbury; Line and station closed	Great Northern Railway; Hertford and Welwyn Junction Railway	Ware; Line closed, station open
