= Welwyn Garden City railway station =

Railway station in Hertfordshire, England

Welwyn Garden City
- A view of the station looking south from the footbridge, showing left to right: platforms 1/2, the Nabisco Shredded Wheat Factory (background), the unplatformed fast lines, the flyover (background), platforms 3/4, the Howard Centre
- Interactive map of Welwyn Garden City

General information
- Location: Welwyn Garden City
- Local authority: Borough of Welwyn Hatfield
- Grid reference: TL240129
- Managed by: Great Northern
- Station code: WGC
- DfT category: C1
- Number of platforms: 4
- Tracks: 6
- Accessible: Yes

National Rail annual entry and exit
- 2020–21: ▼0.587 million
- Interchange: ▼18,178
- 2021–22: ▲1.501 million
- Interchange: ▲38,232
- 2022–23: ▲2.081 million
- Interchange: ▲41,800
- 2023–24: ▲2.313 million
- Interchange: ▼33,025
- 2024–25: ▲2.516 million
- Interchange: ▼8,564

Railway companies
- Original company: London and North Eastern Railway
- Post-grouping: London and North Eastern Railway

Key dates
- 1 September 1920: First station Welwyn Garden City Halt opened
- 20 September 1926: First station closed; present station Welwyn Garden City opened

Other information
- External links: Departures; Facilities
- Coordinates: 51.801°N 0.204°W

Welwyn Garden City railway station serves the town of Welwyn Garden City in Hertfordshire, England. It is situated 20 miles 25 chains (20.31 miles, 32.69 km) down the line from London King's Cross on the East Coast Main Line. Train services are currently provided by Thameslink and Great Northern, which are sub-brands of Greater Thameslink Railway.

The first station in what is now Welwyn Garden City was Welwyn Junction, which was open between 1858 and 1860 to provide interchange with the Hertford, Luton and Dunstable Railway, but it was closed when Hatfield was chosen as a preferential terminus. In 1917, during the construction of the town, a temporary station opened for employees to the north of the current station, and by 1920 passengers were allowed to use the station, but it was not an official arrangement nor included in timetables. The first official station to serve the garden city opened to the south on 20 September 1926.

Passenger services on the branches to Hertford and Dunstable ended in 1951 and 1965 respectively. Between 1973 and 1975, a flyover was built to the south of the station to allow commuter trains to reverse without blocking the fast lines. As part of the same modernisation programme, electrified carriage sidings were added to the north of the station. In 1990, the Howard Centre opened adjacent to the station, which incorporated a new station to replace the original 1926 building. Today the line is the northern terminus of commuter services to Moorgate, and to Sevenoaks via London St Pancras in peak hours.

== History ==
The line through what is now Welwyn Garden City was opened by the Great Northern Railway (GNR) between Maiden Lane and Peterborough on 7 August 1850, with Welwyn (now Welwyn North) as one of the intermediate stations. On 1 March 1858, a station named Welwyn Junction was opened by the Hertford and Welwyn Junction Railway as an interchange with the GNR, north of the current station. The same year, the company merged with the Luton, Dunstable, and Welwyn Junction Railway into the Hertford, Luton and Dunstable Railway (HL&DR). The station was closed on 1 September 1860, when the HL&DR line from Dunstable opened, and Hatfield was chosen as the interchange station.

From 1868, one track was added each side of the GNR line to carry the HL&DR to Hatfield. In 1917, halt-style platforms were built for employees on the HL&DR tracks north of the current station. The station was opened to passengers on 16 August 1920, but was not included in timetables. By August 1926 the GNR were operating a daily 'Garden City Express' that ran fast from Finsbury Park to the station. On 20 September 1926, Neville Chamberlain officially opened the new Welwyn Garden City station to the south. The new station had four platforms, one in each direction for the GNR, and two bidirectional lines for the two HL&DR branches.

The Hertford branch line was closed to rail passenger traffic in 1951 and to goods in 23 May 1966, whilst the Dunstable line fell victim to the Beeching Axe in April 1965 (although goods traffic survived until 1971). The section of the HL&DR between Welwyn Garden City and Dunstable now forms the Ayot Greenway, a 2 1/2-mile (4.0 km) rail trail open to non-motorised traffic.

Between London Kings Cross and Huntingdon, the East Coast Main Line primarily has four tracks which are quadrupled by direction. This means that to terminate and reverse, a commuter train must cross the two fast lines. As part of the rationalisation and electrification of the East Coast Main Line in the 1970s, a flyover was constructed to the south of the station between 1973 and 1975; this connects the Up Slow line and Up Yard to platforms three and four. Both the Down Slow line in platform three and the line through platform four can be used bi-directionally, allowing trains to turn back to London.

In February 1985, permission was sought from Welwyn Hatfield District Council to demolish the ticket hall and replace it with a shopping centre, in hopes of revitalising the town centre. Permission was granted and the Howard Centre was opened in October 1990, with the original ticket hall demolished. The new ticket hall is within the shopping centre with lifts and steps linking to the platforms.

Welwyn Garden City was semi-refurbished by First Capital Connect during 2007, which saw improved lighting installed, new bus-shelter-style waiting rooms and improved toilets on each platform island. The refurbishments also saw the installation of ticket gates. Towards the end of 2007, Welwyn Garden City was awarded Secure Station status, along with many other stations along the Great Northern route as part of a stations improvement programme. As part of this award, many additional cameras were installed. The line near the station has seen three serious train crashes, in 1930, 1935 and 1957.

== Design ==
Looking northbound in 1992, from left to right: the Howard Centre, northbound platforms 3 and 4, the through tracks, southbound platforms 1 and 2, and the Up Yard

The original station building was located on Howardsgate and was designed in the Neo-Georgian style by Louis de Soissons, who was the chief architect of the town. The station has four platforms, with two island platforms serving each direction: platforms one and two serve trains to London, and platforms three and four serve northbound and terminating trains. The two fast lines are not platformed. Each island platform is 180 metres (600 ft) in length with red-brick buildings and roof spans for some of their length.

The station footbridge connects to a footpath via a walkway and stairs in one direction, and to the first floor of the Howard Centre in the other direction, where ticket machines are available. The station has direct access to the Howard Centre. The shopping centre also incorporates the station's ticket office on the first floor. There are four ticket machines: three standard touch screen machines and one card-only machine. There are also help-points located within the station. The station is also served by several bus routes operated by Arriva Shires & Essex, Centrebus and Uno.

=== Sidings ===
The Up Yard, comprising six sidings, can be accessed from the Up lines to the north and south of the station, and trains can use the flyover to access the northbound platforms by reversing in the Welwyn Reversing Line. The EMU sidings are situated north of the station and consist of nine electrified tracks. Eight-car Class 700 trains can only use five of the sidings to prevent them blocking the neighbouring siding, and this was also the case for the Class 365 when they were used on the Great Northern route. These sidings, like the flyover, were added by British Rail to coincide with the electrification and modernisation of the route.

The layout of the station in 1957 as reported after the crash of the same year

== Services ==
All off-peak services at Welwyn Garden City are operated by Great Northern, a sub-brand of Greater Thameslink Railway. The typical off-peak service in trains per hour is:

- 2 tph to London King's Cross (semi-fast)
- 2 tph to Moorgate (all stations)
- 2 tph to Letchworth Garden City, of which 1 continues to Cambridge

Additional services to Moorgate run in peak hours, and the Letchworth service is extended to Cambridge. Additionally, there are peak-hours Thameslink services to Sevenoaks via St Pancras International and Catford.

Preceding station	National Rail	Following station
Hatfield	Great Northern Great Northern route Semi-Fast Services	Welwyn North
Hatfield	Great Northern Great Northern route Stopping Services	Terminus
Hatfield	Thameslink Thameslink Peak Hours Only	Terminus
	Disused railways	
Hatfield Line and station open	Great Northern Railway Dunstable Branch	Ayot Line and station closed
Hatfield Line and station open	Great Northern Railway Hertford and Welwyn Junction Railway	Cole Green Line and station closed
