= Woodall =

Woodall may refer to:

== People ==
=== Given name ===
- Woodall Rodgers (1890–1961), attorney, businessman and mayor of Dallas

=== Surname ===
- Al Woodall (born 1945), American football player
- Arthur Woodall (1930 – 2005), English footballer
- Corbet Woodall (1929–1982), British newsreader for the BBC
- Derek Woodall, rugby league footballer of the 1970s and 1980s for Castleford
- H. J. Woodall, British Mathematician
- Ian Woodall (born 1956), British mountaineer
- John Woodall (1570–1643), English military surgeon
- John Woodall (footballer) (born 1949), English professional footballer
- John P. Woodall (1935–2016), British/American entomologist and virologist
- Lee Woodall (born 1969), American football player
- Leo Woodall (born 1996), English actor
- Rob Woodall (born 1970), American politician
- Trinny Woodall (born 1964), English fashion advisor and designer, television presenter and author

== Places ==
- Woodall, Oklahoma, United States
- Woodall, South Yorkshire, England
- Woodall Mountain, highest point in Mississippi, United States

== Other uses ==
- Woodall number, a subset of natural numbers in mathematics
- Woodall, Tindall, Hebden & Co (The Old Bank) of Scarborough, North Yorkshire, the smallest of the banks, which in 1896 merged to form Barclays

== See also ==
- Woodhall (disambiguation)
- Woodhull (disambiguation)
