= LaSalle Investment Management =

Real estate investment management firm

- Industry: Investment Management
- Founded: 1968; 58 years ago
- Headquarters: Chicago, Illinois, United States
- Area served: Worldwide
- Key people: Mark Gabbay (Executive Chairman); Brad Gries (CEO); Tim Kessler (President and COO)
- AUM: $86.4 billion (as of December 31, 2025)
- Number of employees: 875+ (as of Q2 2024)
- Parent: JLL
- Website: www.lasalle.com

LaSalle Investment Management (LaSalle) is a real estate investment management firm that operates as an independent subsidiary of JLL. The firm invests in real estate for institutional investors such as pension funds, endowments, and sovereign wealth funds. It is headquartered in Chicago, Illinois and has 24 locations across North America, Europe, and Asia.

== History ==
LaSalle Investment Management was formed in 1999, when the U.S. real estate investment firm LaSalle Partners merged with U.K.-based Jones Lang Wootton to create Jones Lang LaSalle (JLL). It was set up to function as a subsidiary of JLL that advises large institutions.

Since its inception, LaSalle has expanded from traditional commercial property development into specialized sectors including life sciences, data centers, self-storage, and student housing. The firm has also expanded its debt investment operations.

In 2018, LaSalle acquired Aviva Investors' real estate multi-manager business and subsequently launched LaSalle Global Partner Solutions. At this time, LaSalle was managing approximately $58 billion of assets globally. As of 2024, the firm manages about $88 billion in assets.
