= National Cycle Route 61 =

Route of the National Cycle Network in the UK

National Cycle Route 61 is part of the National Cycle Network managed by the charity Sustrans. It runs for 34 miles from Maidenhead (Berkshire) to Rye House (Hertfordshire) via Uxbridge, Watford, St Albans, Hatfield, Welwyn Garden City and Hertford in the United Kingdom.

== Route ==
=== Maidenhead to Uxbridge ===
Maidenhead | Windsor | Uxbridge

National Cycle Route 61 starts from a junction with National Cycle Route 4 on the southern outskirts of Maidenhead. It follows the Jubilee River (a River Thames flood relief channel, passing north of Windsor not far from Eton College. Just north of Eton, the route leaves the river to cross Ditton Park and then turns north through Langley. The route then follows country lanes and a section of unsurfaced bridleway before joining National Cycle Route 6 on the towpath of the Grand Union Canal at Cowley in Uxbridge, not far from Brunel University.

=== Uxbridge to St Albans ===
Uxbridge | Rickmansworth | Watford | St Albans

From Uxbridge to St Albans, route 61 shares a common section described in the National Cycle Route 6 entry. With a few diversions, the route from Uxbridge to Rickmansworth follows the towpath of the Grand Union Canal in the Colne Valley. At Rickmansworth it joins the Ebury Way, a rail trail which runs along a former line of the Watford and Rickmansworth Railway. After central Watford, the route continues to follow the River Colne north westwards leading to an attractive wooded section at Bricket Wood. Route 61 then climbs up into the village of Chiswell Green, an unsurfaced section leads to the bridge over the A414, the former M10 motorway.

Passing through the southern suburbs of St Albans the route then reaches a level crossing over the railway, known locally as the Abbey Flyer after the nearby St Albans Abbey station. Cyclists wishing to visit Verulamium (Roman St Albans) should use the level crossing and follow the St Albans Green Ring signs to the park and museum. Just after this level crossing, route 61 leaves National Cycle Route 6. The centre of St Albans can be reached by following route 6 north from here.

=== St Albans to Rye House ===
St Albans | Hatfield | Welwyn Garden City | Hertford | Ware | Rye House, Hoddesdon

The section of route 61 from St Albans to Hatfield is known as the Alban Way. It is a former railway line. Just after the route pass the former London Road station, it goes under the Midland Main Line and then reaches a zig-zag cycle route up the hill to St Albans City station. At Nast Hyde, Hatfield, a local resident has restored the former station platform sign and provided information about the former railway.

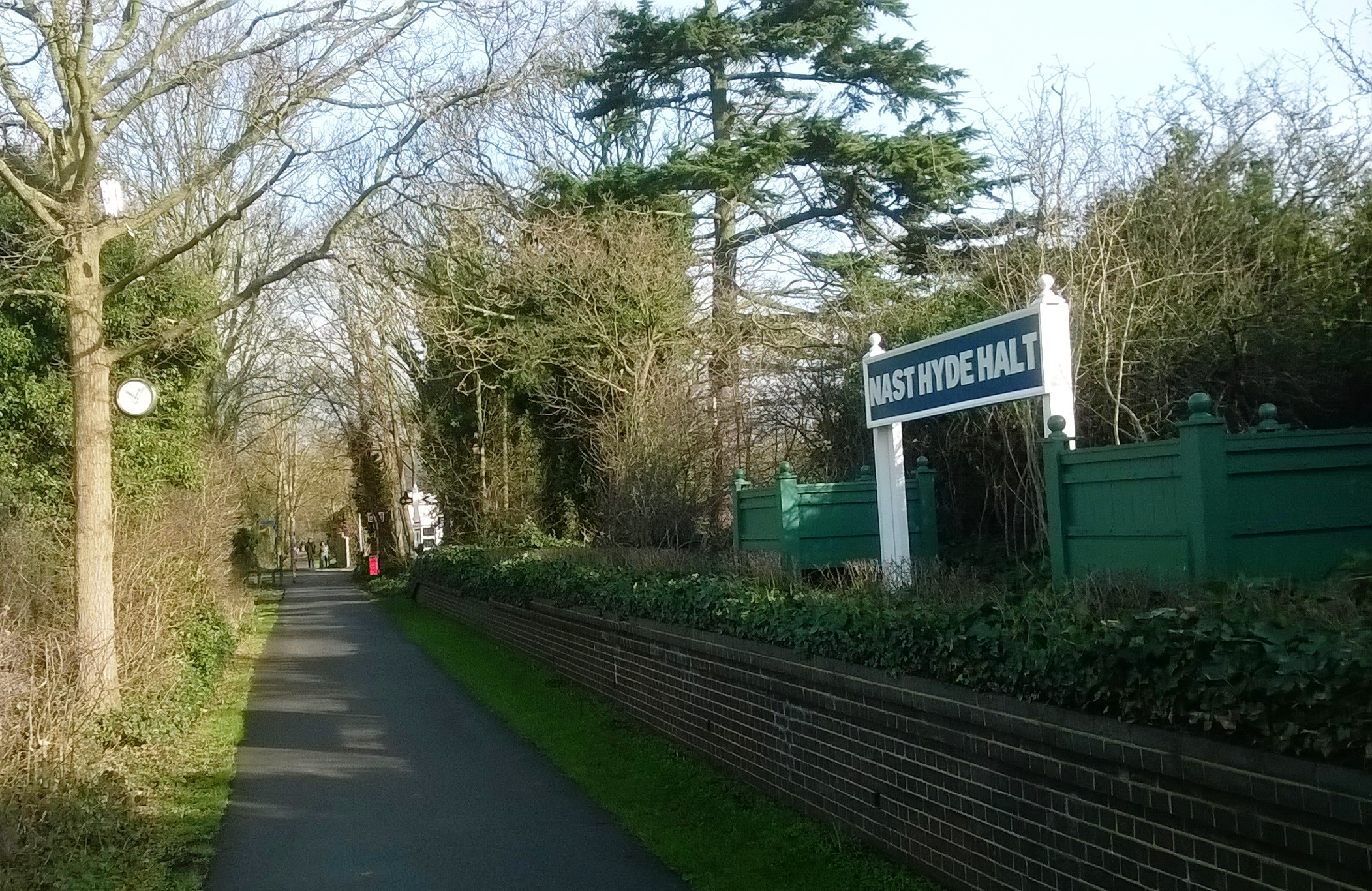
Shows the partially restored station and National Cycle Route 61, known as the Alban Way on this section.

The cycle route then enters Hatfield, passing east of the Galleria shopping centre and curving round to join National Cycle Route 12 just north of Hatfield station.

The combined routes 12 and 61 then pass over the A414 and pass the hamlet of Mill Green where there is a restored water mill, Mill Green Museum. Just before Twentieth Mile Bridge in Welwyn Garden City, route 61 leaves route 12 to head east. At Great Ganett, route 61 becomes the Cole Green Way, mostly following the line of another old railway.

At Hertford, the town is entered at the stadium for Hertford Football Club. Care must be taken when riding through the car park on match days. Central Hertford is particularly attractive and is a good location to stop for refreshments. Hertford Museum is passed and then route 61 crosses the River Lea (or Lee as it becomes at this point) at the start of the Hertford Arm of the Lee and Stort Navigation, a canalised river. The section of the route from Hertford to Ware via Hartham Common and alongside the river is very popular with cyclists and walkers. Along this section you will pass the start of the New River. As the information board by route 61 explains, the New River is not new or a river, it being a man made channel opened in 1613 to carry clean water to central London.

At Ware there is a choice of route either via Ware station or a narrower section of towpath through the town centre. From Ware route 61 is on the towpath of the Lea and Stort Navigation until it reaches its end at Rye House. Part of Rye House, one of the earliest brick buildings in the UK, can be visited just north of the river. Here the cycle route makes a junction with National Cycle Route 1. Turn south to follow the River Lee into London or north for the route via Harlow to Chelmsford.
