= Woodell =

Woodell is a surname. Notable people with the surname include:

- Barbara Woodell (1910–1997), American actress
- Colin Woodell (born 1991), American actor
- Pat Woodell (1944–2015), American actress and singer
- Stan Woodell (1928–2004), British botanist

== See also ==
- Woodall (disambiguation)
