= St John's Church, Letty Green =

Church in Hertfordshire, England

Coordinates: 51.7817°N 0.1365°W

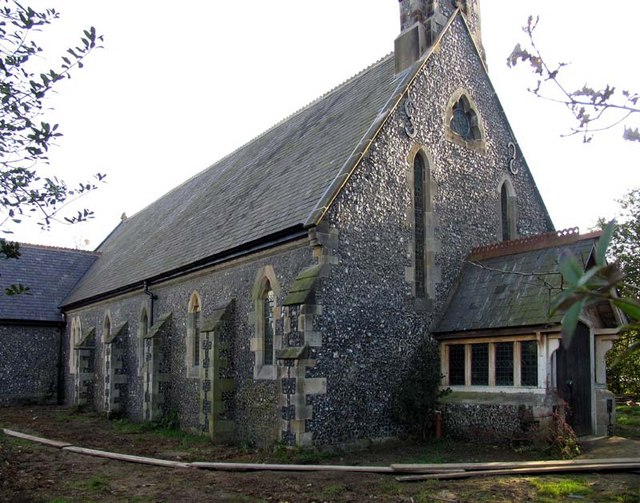
The church, photographed in 2005

St John's Church, Letty Green, is a deconsecrated Gothic Revival church in Letty Green, Hertfordshire, England.

The building was designed by George Fowler Jones. It was given a heritage listing (Grade II) in the 1960s. It went on the market in 2001 with planning permission for conversion to residential use. It has since been converted.
