= Cole Green Way =

Public right of way

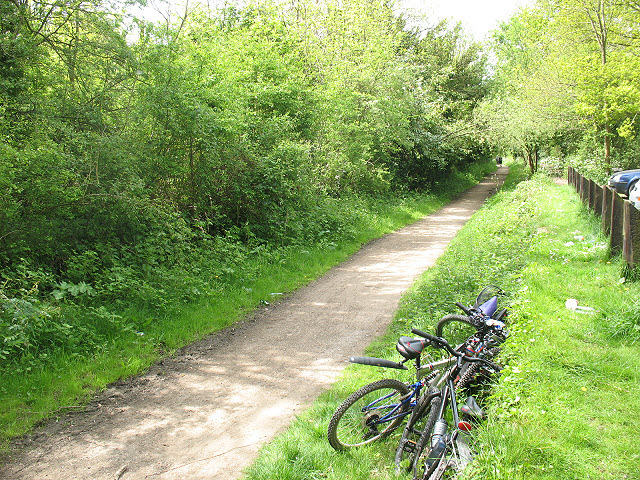
- Path at the old Cole Green station
- Length: 6 mi (9.7 km)
- Location: Hertfordshire, England
- Trailheads: Welwyn Garden City; 51.7908°N 0.1681°W; Hertford; 51.7921°N 0.0861°W
- Use: Hiking, Running, Cycling, Horseriding

The Cole Green Way is a rail trail which runs east–west from the eastern edge of Welwyn Garden City to Hertford in Hertfordshire. Part of National Cycle Network Route 61, and the Lea Valley Walk, it runs for more than six miles along the former Hertford, Luton & Dunstable branch line from Welwyn Garden City railway station to Hertford North railway station.

== History ==
The original line opened on 1 March 1858 and operated passenger traffic until 18 June 1951. It was never a busy branch line, and numbers decreased quickly after the Hertford Loop Line was added to the Great Northern Line from London King's Cross, which gave faster access to Hertford North railway station. Prior to the Loop opening, trains on this branch terminated at Hertford Cowbridge. It closed completely to goods traffic on 1 August 1962 and the track was lifted shortly afterwards.

The former trackbed has been used as a public footpath since and was refurbished by the local council to provide better facilities, including a public car park at what was Cole Green railway station. The route is largely flat, which makes it popular with walkers, horse riders and cyclists.

At the far end of the car park and associated picnic area, almost hidden in the undergrowth are the remains of buffers, presumably from station sidings.

The woodland associated with the car park and picnic area has a number of items carved from standing wood.

The route forms part of Route 61 of the National Cycle Network.

== Route ==
Starting on the eastern edge of Welwyn Garden City at Cole Green Lane, the route heads east towards the household recycling centre by the A414 with an underpass to allow access to the former Cole Green railway station. There are bridges at Station Road by Cole Green and Chapel Lane near Letty Green. A further bridge was filled in further along, which means users must cross a country lane before rejoining the trail. At St. Mary's Lane there is another bridge just short of what was Hertingfordbury railway station (now a private residence), and then the trail finishes by Hertford Town Football Club and the viaduct south of Hertford North railway station.

== Other rail trails ==
The Cole Green Way is one of three rail trails in the Welwyn Hatfield area. The other two are the Alban Way, from Hatfield to St. Albans, and the Ayot Greenway, which connects Welwyn Garden City to Wheathampstead.
