= Letty Green =

Village in Hertfordshire, England

Coordinates: 51.782°N 0.137°W

- Location within Hertfordshire
- Civil parish: Hertingfordbury
- District: East Hertfordshire
- Shire county: Hertfordshire
- Region: East
- Country: England
- Sovereign state: United Kingdom
- Post town: Hertford
- Postcode district: SG14
- Police: Hertfordshire
- Fire: Hertfordshire
- Ambulance: East of England
- UK Parliament: North East Hertfordshire

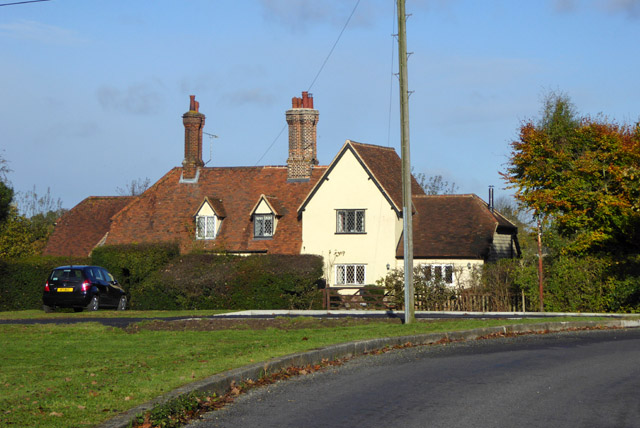
Letty Green, Hertingfordbury

Letty Green is a village in the parish of Hertingfordbury, Hertfordshire, England.

St John’s Church, Letty Green, the deconsecrated former parish church, is a grade II listed building, and Woolmer's Park country house is grade II* listed and was the source for the name of Woolmers Estate in Tasmania.
