= Hertford, Luton and Dunstable Railway =

Railway line in England

The Hertford, Luton and Dunstable Railway was a railway affiliated to the Great Northern Railway. It was formed when the Hertford and Welwyn Junction Railway (opened 1858) merged with the Luton, Dunstable and Welwyn Junction Railway, partly opened in the same year. The merger and change of title took place in 1860. The new railway comprised two lines: Hatfield–Dunstable ("the Dunstable line") and Hatfield–Hertford ("the Hertford line"). The Dunstable line joined the Dunstable branch of the London and North Western Railway at Dunstable North, and the Hertford line met with the Hertford Loop line at Hertford North, before diverging to meet the branch line to Hertford East between its terminus and Ware.

For some time the HL&DR was the only railway at Luton, and the early industry took considerable benefit from it, and later industry was encouraged by it. Even when the competing direct line from Luton to London was opened, the route via Hatfield held its own for some time. The Hertford extremity did not fare so well, and remained rural and relatively undeveloped throughout its life. Passenger services on the Hatfield to Hertford line ended in 1951, and on the Dunstable line in 1965. Goods traffic did not last much longer. A guided busway was installed on the trackbed between Luton and Dunstable in 2013.

== Background ==
=== London and Birmingham Railway ===
The London and Birmingham Railway opened its line in 1838, passing Leighton, later named Leighton Buzzard. Luton and Dunstable were important manufacturing towns, and in 1841 a scheme was put forward for a branch line from Leighton to Dunstable and Luton. George Stephenson planned a scheme for the line, but there was opposition from Luton interests to some of the public land that was to be taken, and the scheme failed.

A shorter line simply reaching Dunstable from Leighton seemed to be less difficult, and as the scheme had the support of the London and Birmingham Railway, proposals were submitted to Parliament. The result that the Dunstable and London and Birmingham Railway Act 1845 (8 & 9 Vict. c. xxxvii) was given royal assent on 30 June 1845, with capital of £50,000.

In 1846 the London and Birmingham Railway amalgamated with others and formed the London and North Western Railway.

The Dunstable line was opened for traffic on 1 June 1848. There was one intermediate station, at Stanbridgeford, although it was not ready for opening until the year after the line started operation. It was worked from the outset by the London and North Western Railway, and the new line was effectively the Dunstable branch of the LNWR and was purchased by that company on the opening of the line for the sum of £2,952

=== Great Northern Railway ===
If the London and Birmingham Railway and its successor the LNWR were the great trunk railway to the north on the west side of the country, another was in the process of building on the east side: the Great Northern Railway was to connect London and York, at first by a rather roundabout route. It opened part of its main line, between a London station and Peterborough on 7 August 1850. During the construction process the GNR directors saw that it was important to secure areas of territory for their own railway by building branches within the area. If a company had a useful branch line in an area, Parliament would be reluctant to authorise a rival line in the same area.

Accordingly the Great Northern Railway promoted a line that became known as the Hertford, Hatfield and St Albans Railway; it was not independent, but was promoted directly by the GNR. It was authorised by the Great Northern Railway (Hertford, Hatfield and St. Albans Branch) Act 1847 (10 & 11 Vict. c. cclxxii) of 22 July 1847. It was to build a line from Hatfield (on the GNR main line) to St Albans and also from Hatfield to Hertford. Authorised capital was £300,000. The year 1847 marked the end of the Railway Mania, and suddenly money for railway schemes was to become unobtainable, and nothing more was heard of this authorised railway. The St Albans line was built later under a fresh authorisation.

== Hertford and Welwyn Junction Railway ==
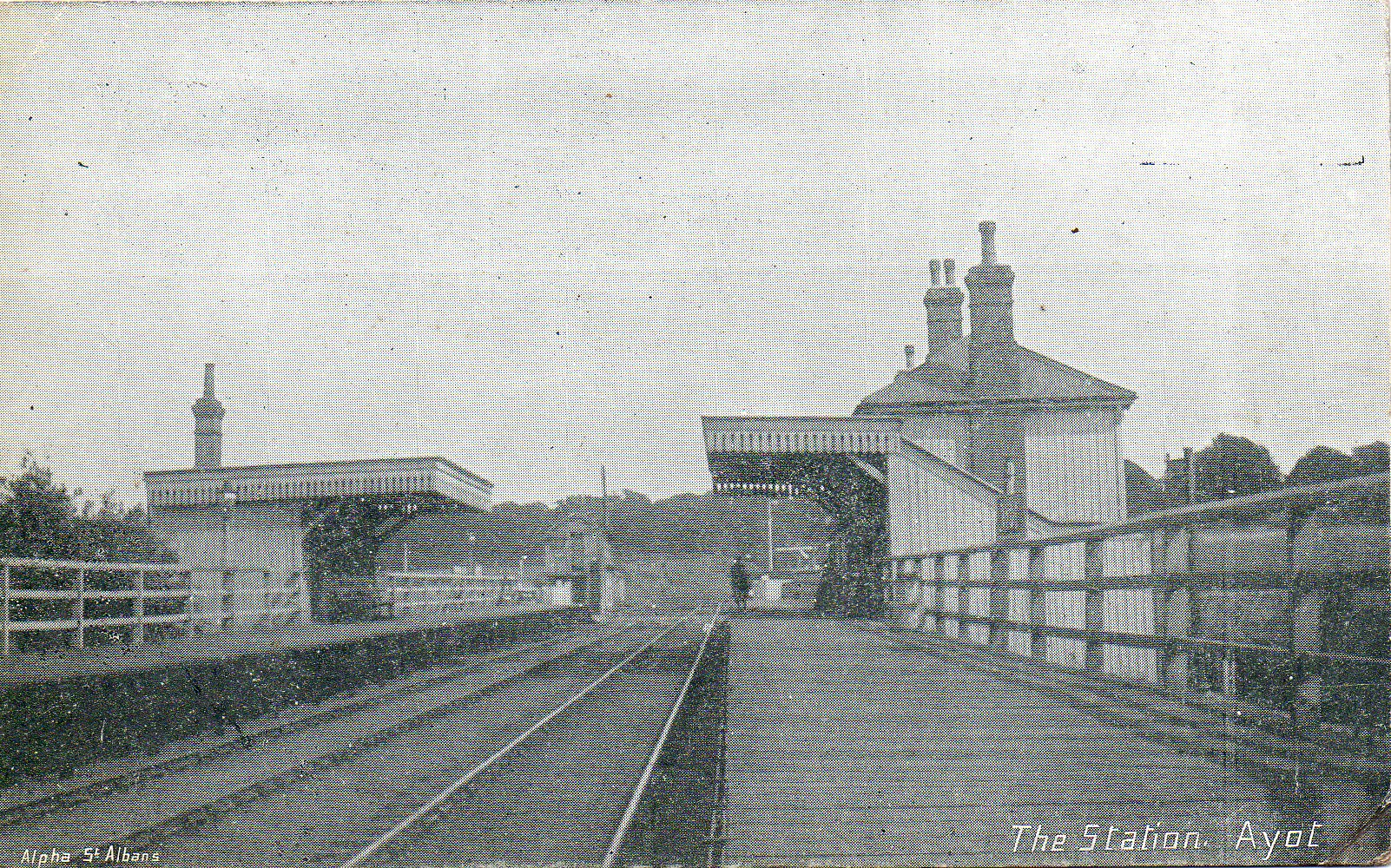
Ayot station

Hertford already had a railway, completed in 1843. It was the terminus of a branch line of the Northern and Eastern Railway, which was being worked by the Eastern Counties Railway. The Hertford station was somewhat to the east of the present-day Hertford East station. As the money market stabilised, it became possible to propose new lines. The Hertford and Welwyn Junction Railway (H&WJR) was formed and the Hertford and Welwyn Junction Railway Act 1854 (17 & 18 Vict. c. cxxvii) was given royal assent on 3 July 1854; it was to build from the Eastern Counties Railway terminus at Hertford (converting it to a through station). via a Cowbridge station near the centre of Hertford to a new Welwyn Junction station, at the south end of Digswell Viaduct on the GNR. There was to be a triangular junction there, and the new company would have running powers into Welwyn station (now Welwyn North, and located at the north end of the viaduct). Authorised capital was £65,000.

The line was opened to goods traffic on 28 February 1858 (a Sunday) and to passengers on Monday 1 March 1858.

It was operated jointly by the GNR and the Eastern Counties Railway, and there were some through bookings between their respective stations. The line also provided a useful route to the London docks for goods traffic to and from the GNR; there were sidings at Welwyn Junction where the traffic was exchanged.

== Luton, Dunstable and Welwyn Junction Railway ==
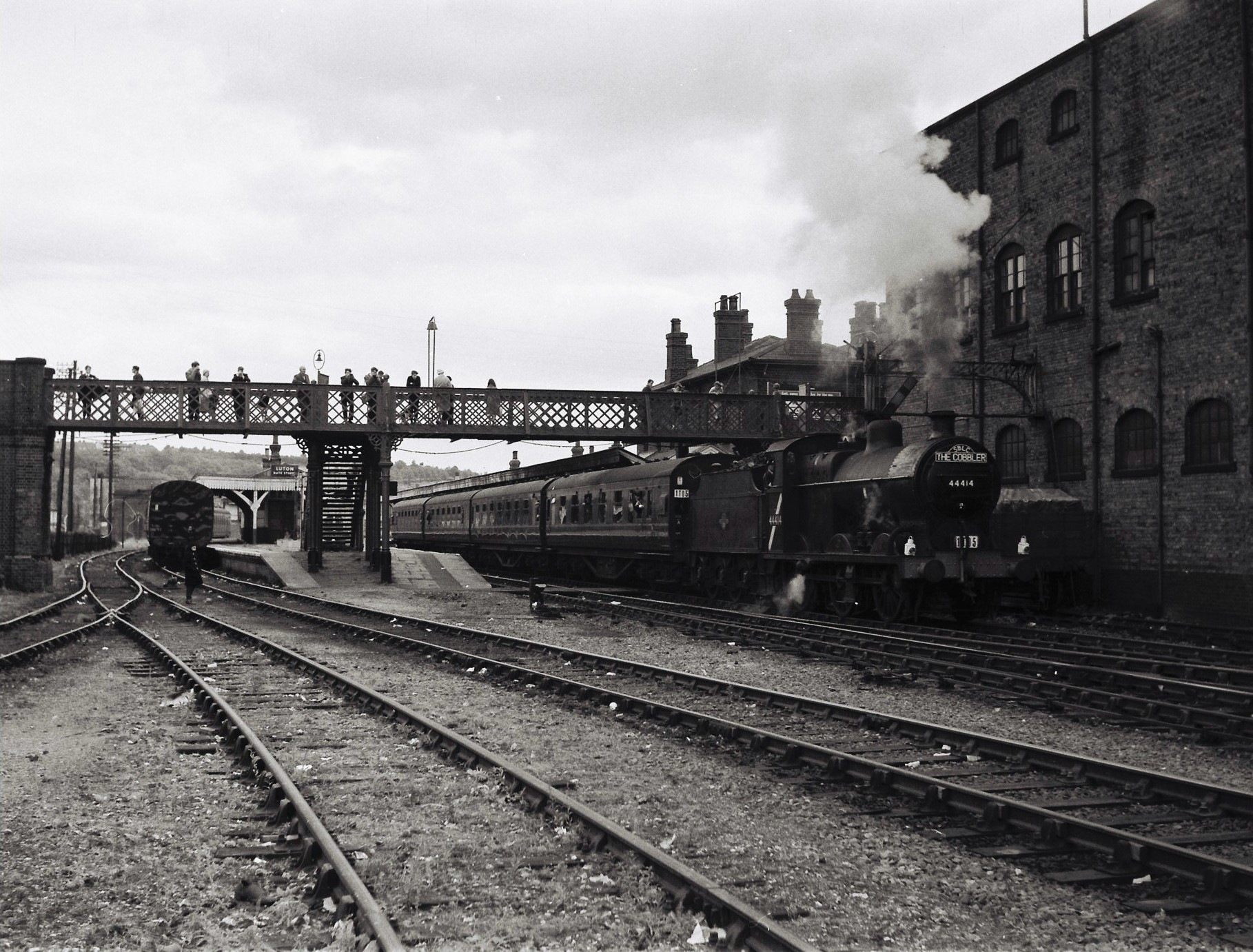
Luton GNR station with a special train in 1964

Luton was said at the time to be the largest town in England not connected to a railway or a canal. (Note: The Midland Main Line through Luton was not ready for passenger traffic until 1868.) Local interests complained that they did not have a good transport system for their products, A meeting in Luton in 1845 resolved that the solution for their town was not a branch line giving a roundabout connection, but a London to Manchester main line railway via Luton. This was an ambitious scheme that would be in competition with the LNWR and to some extent the Great Northern Railway for long distance traffic and for mineral business, and would certainly not be assisted by them. The resolution does not seem to have led to anything.

In the following parliamentary session, a branch line to serve Luton was authorised: the Luton, Dunstable and Welwyn Junction Railway (LD&WJR) was authorised on 16 July 1855. The authorised capital of the LD&WJR was £108,000. It would be a single line railway, with earthworks and bridges constructed for later conversion to double track; it would run from a junction with the LNWR at Dunstable to the GNR at Welwyn, where there would also be a triangular junction. There would be a connecting line at Digswell with the Hertford line. W. F. Cowper MP was Chairman of this company and of the Hertford and Welwyn Junction company, and the clear intention was that the two companies would work collaboratively

Luton, Dunstable and Welwyn Junction Railway Act 1855
- Act of Parliament
- Parliament of the United Kingdom
- Long title: An Act for making a Railway from the London and Northwestern Railway at Dunstable in the County of Bedford to the Great Northern Railway at or near Welwyn in the County of Hertford, to be called the "Luton, Dunstable, and Welwyn Junction Railway;" and for other Purposes.
- Citation: 18 & 19 Vict. c. cxlvi

Dates
- Royal assent: 16 July 1855

Text of statute as originally enacted

The Luton, Dunstable and Welwyn Junction Railway Act 1855 (18 & 19 Vict. c. cxlvi) authorised it to raise the capital, it was a more difficult matter to actually get subscriptions. This delayed land acquisition seriously, and the directors approached the LNWR, hoping to lease the line to the larger company; the LNWR were not interested. The next proposal was to merge the two local companies. The two lines could be joined at Welwyn by crossing the Great Northern Railway by a bridge linking them, saving money, instead of connecting into the GNR line. This was opposed by the GNR, who saw that they might lose control of the local lines, and even that the LNWR would get access from Leighton over the line into GNR and ECR territory. The GNR made it clear they would demand onerous conditions for the construction of the bridge, and some shareholders opposed the merger for that reason; however the opposition was voted down and the motion to merge the companies was carried, on 26 January 1858. In fact the bridge was never built.

== Amalgamation ==
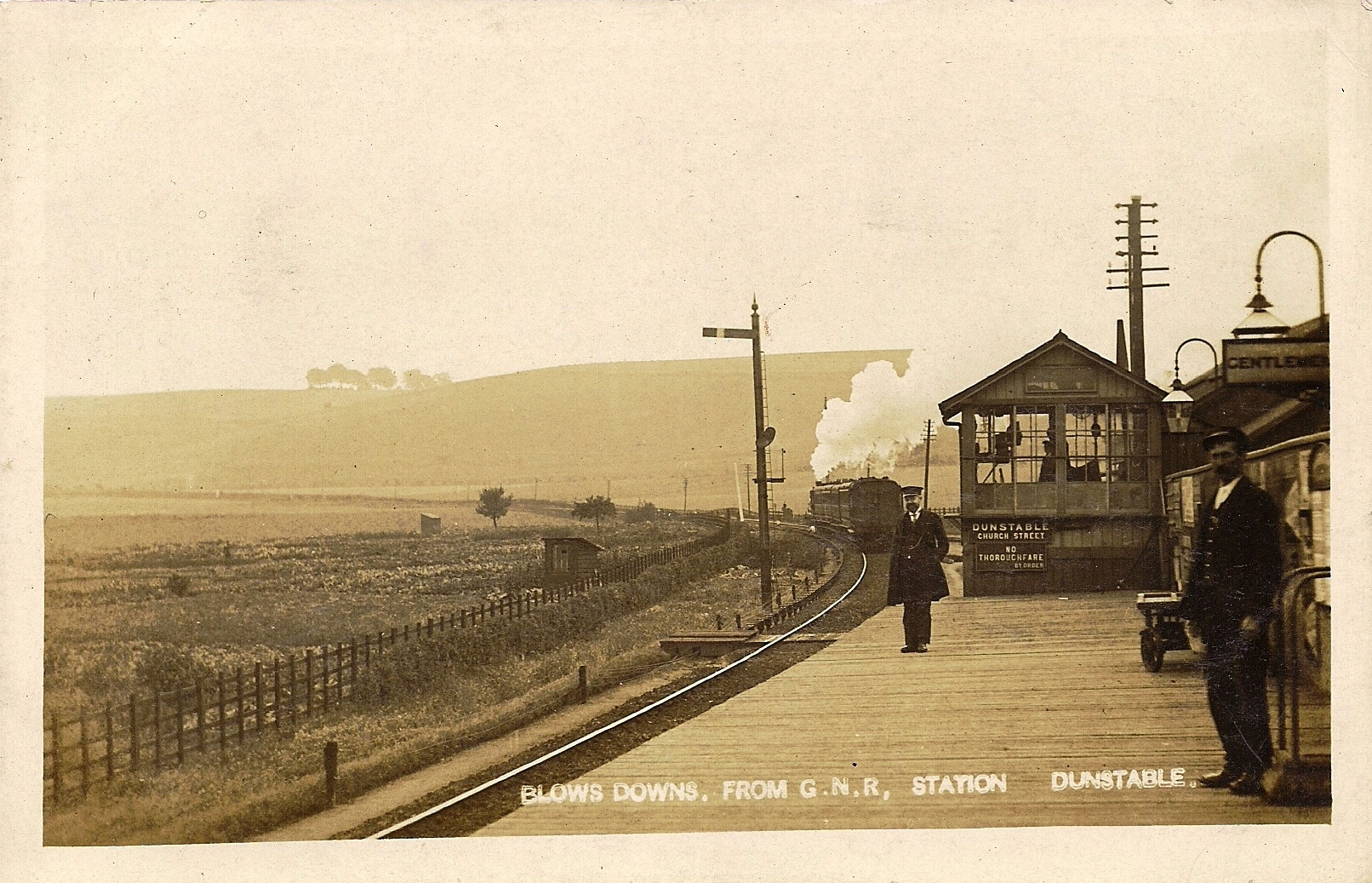
Dunstable Church Street station

Hertford, Luton and Dunstable Railway Act 1858
- Act of Parliament
- Parliament of the United Kingdom
- Long title: An Act for the Amalgamation of the Hertford and Welwyn Junction Railway Company and the Luton, Dunstable, and Welwyn Junction Railway Company into One Company to be called "The Hertford, Luton, and Dunstable Railway Company," and for regulating the Capital of the Company formed by the Amalgamation; and for other Purposes.
- Citation: 21 & 22 Vict. c. lxxiv

Dates
- Royal assent: 28 June 1858

The Hertford, Luton and Dunstable Railway Act 1858 (21 & 22 Vict. c. lxxiv), which authorised the amalgamation of the H&WJR and the Luton, Dunstable, and Welwyn Junction Railway, obtained royal assent on 28 June 1858, with combined capital of £185,000; the resulting company was to be called the Hertford, Luton and Dunstable Railway (HL&DR). Six months notice was given to the ECR to terminate the working agreement on the Hertford line. The Hertford line was already in operation, having opened to goods traffic on 28 February 1858 (a Sunday) and a passenger service on Monday 1 March 1858.

The Luton to Dunstable section was making better progress than before, and on 18 March 1858, Col. Yolland of the Board of Trade visited for the inspection prior to passenger operation. He refused the approval, as there was no turntable at Leighton; there was a policy of forbidding tender engines from running tender first in main traffic. Yolland visited again a month later and this time, the Company undertook not to use tender engines and Yolland passed the line as fit for passenger operation.

=== Entry to Welwyn ===
The valley of the River Mimram runs west to east at Digswell, and the Digswell Viaduct carries the East Coast Main Line of the Great Northern Railway over it. Welwyn was a small community at that time, and there was a Welwyn station at the north end of the viaduct; this station is now named Welwyn North. Welwyn Garden City was not inaugurated as a community until 1920. The triangular junction was to be located at the south end of the viaduct; the intention of the promoters of the H&WJR was to provide for direct southward running to London from Hertford at the junction, but also direct northward running to the Welwyn [North] station, which would become the junction station for passengers to the branch. There were to be running powers for goods trains as far as Ware.

In fact when the line was constructed, these intentions were altered. A new Welwyn Junction station was opened, a little north of the present-day Welwyn Garden City station, immediately on the north side of Hunter's Bridge, which nowadays carries Bridge Road over the railway. This was considered a preferable interchange for the branch, and the proposed north curve of the triangle was never built.

== Opening and operation ==
Goods train operation did not need the approval, and it had been planned to open the line to goods trains on 8 March 1858; however last-minute difficulties over a dispute with the L&NWR over the use of Dunstable station, and the discovery of a bridge that was inadequate in strength, led to the goods opening being delayed until 5 April 1858. The passenger service started on 3 May 1858. There were five trains each way daily except Sundays, and they were worked by the LNWR as the line was only connected to their line. (The LNWR retained running powers Dunstable to Luton after the line was connected at the Welwyn end.)

The LNWR Dunstable station had been built as a terminus, on the west side of Watling Street, and when the line from Luton opened, trains used it by reversing between the station and the junction west of that point. A separate station at Dunstable, named Church Street, was opened in June 1858.

Hertford, Luton and Dunstable Railway Act 1859
- Act of Parliament
- Parliament of the United Kingdom
- Long title: An Act for authorizing the Hertford, Luton, and Dunstable Railway Company to raise further Capital for the Purposes of the Hertford Section of their Railway; and for extending the Period for the Completion of the Luton Section of their Railway; and for other Purposes.
- Citation: 22 & 23 Vict. c. xxxiii

Dates
- Royal assent: 21 July 1859

At the Welwyn end of the line, progress was not so good. In fact the company ran out of time, and the time limit imposed on the earlier act had to be extended, by the Hertford, Luton and Dunstable Railway Act 1859 (22 & 23 Vict. c. xxxiii) of 21 July 1859. A demonstration run for the directors ran on 12 June 1860, and a shareholders' special train ran on 17 July 1860. The section between Luton and Welwyn Junction opened for passenger and goods traffic on 1 September 1860, and was worked by the Great Northern Railway. The Welwyn Junction station was closed on the same day, and trains continued to Hatfield station instead. A Sunday passenger train service was operated, but from 1 June 1866 it did not run throughout to Dunstable LNWR, but terminated at Dunstable Church Street. As there was no run-round facility there, the arriving engine was run round its train by gravitating the coaches while the engine was in a siding. The LNWR ceased running a service between Dunstable and Luton between 1866 and 1881.

The Great Northern Railway ran a commercially competitive service to London from Luton via Hatfield, notwithstanding the longer route and branch line alignment for part of the way.

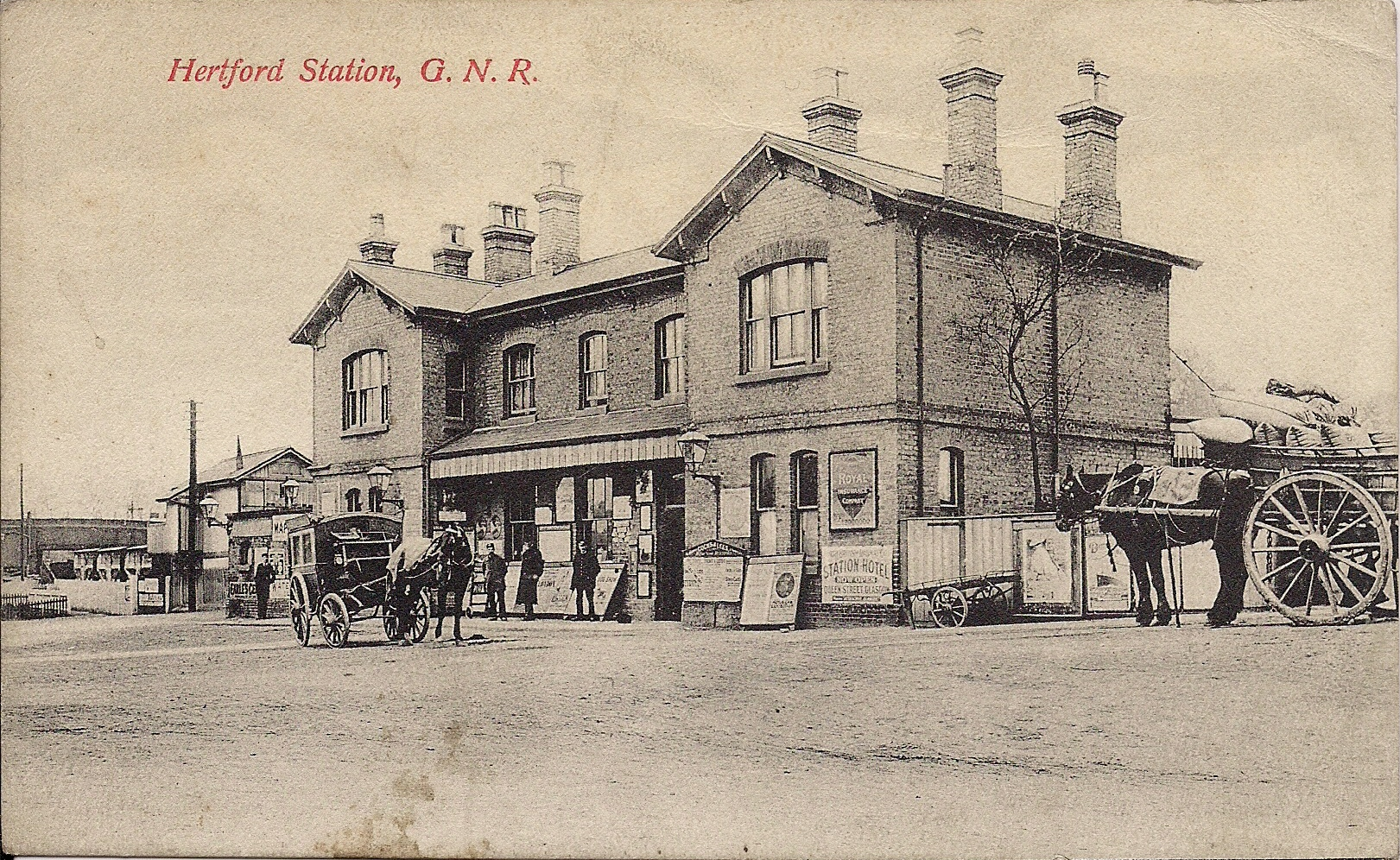
Hertford Cowbridge railway station

Great Northern Railway Act 1861
- Act of Parliament
- Parliament of the United Kingdom
- Long title: An Act to vest in the Great Northern Railway Company the Hertford, Luton, and Dunstable Railway, and for other Purposes relating to the same Company.
- Citation: 24 & 25 Vict. c. lxx

Dates
- Royal assent: 12 June 1861

The HL&DR was acquired by the Great Northern Railway by the Great Northern Railway Act 1861 (24 & 25 Vict. c. lxx) of 12 June 1861. The LNWR running powers from Dunstable to Luton were sustained in the act.

Wrottesley says at this point, "The GN later abandoned the short curves proposed at Welwyn." This refers to the northward spurs for both the Hertford and Luton lines, which had never been built; the "abandonment" is of the intention to make them.

The situation at Dunstable was obviously unsatisfactory with GNR trains reversing into the LNWR station, and a new Dunstable North station was opened in January 1866. The GNR's Church Street station was inconvenient and inadequate, and it was rebuilt after a fire in 1871.

In 1868 the Midland Railway opened its main line from St Pancras to Bedford, with a main station at Luton, adjacent to the GNR station there.

In 1895 the passenger service was recorded in Bradshaw. There were seven trains each weekday on the LNWR Dunstable branch; there were ten throughout between Dunstable and Hatfield, as well as seven (eight on Saturdays) between Luton and Dunstable. Three journeys were made each way on the Hertford branch.

In the first years of the twentieth century, a number of railway companies tried out railmotors, single-coach passenger units with a small integrated steam engine. These were useful on sparsely-trafficked lines, and generally had retractable steps to enable the use of cheap track-level "platforms" with minimal facilities. The GNR tried this system on the Hatfield to Hertford line in 1904. Attimore Hall Halt and Hatfield Hall Halt were opened on this basis in 1904, but the experiment was unsuccessful, and the halts and the system were discontinued in 1905.

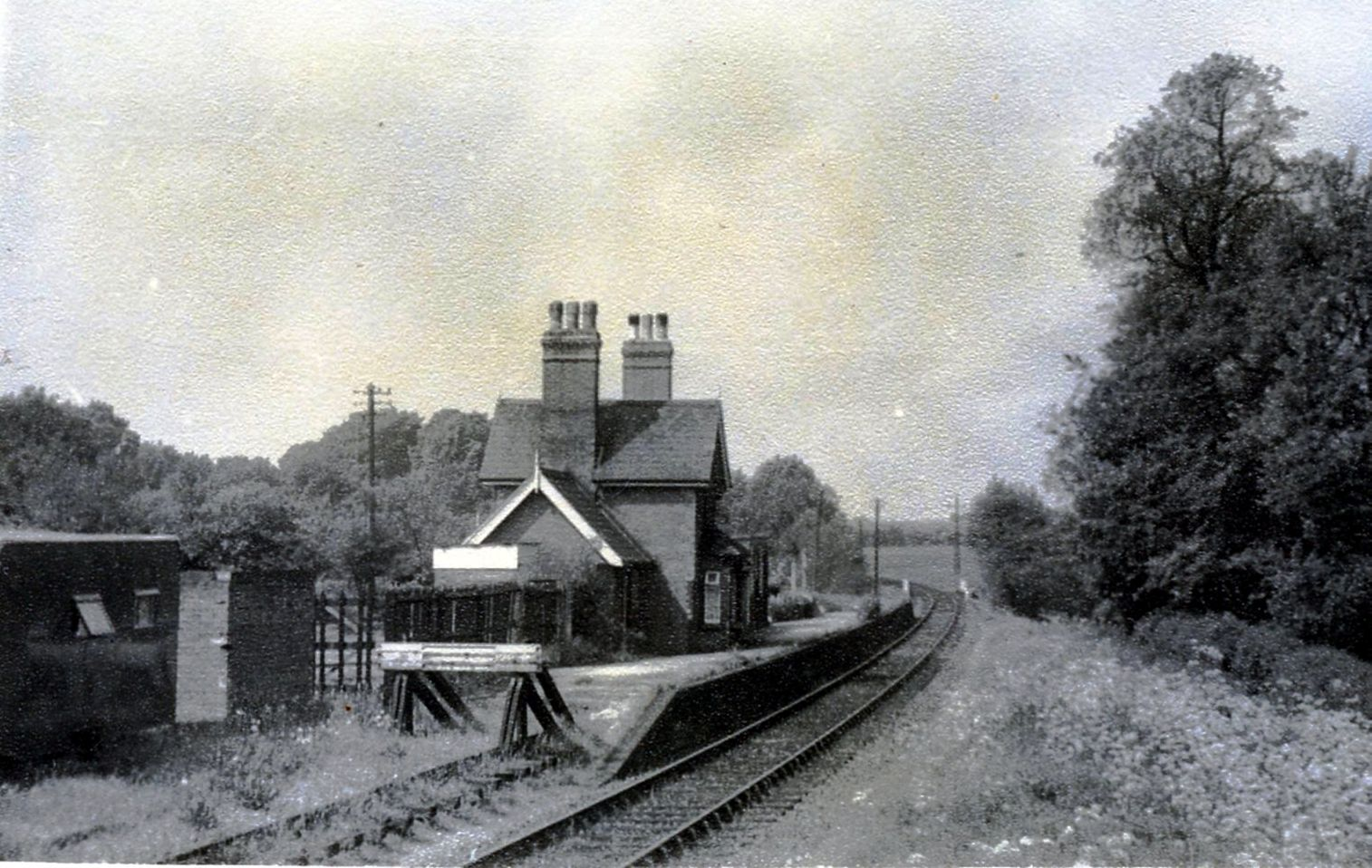
Hertingfordbury railway station in 1953

Writing in 1908, Goodman described the track layout from Hatfield to Welwyn Junction; the heavy and slow mineral traffic on the main line had caused the GNR to widen the line; there were six tracks: from east to west they were:

- Hertford branch line;
- Up Goods Line
- Up Main Line;
- Down Main Line;
- Down Goods Line;
- Luton Branch Line.

Bradshaw for 1910 shows the passenger service had increased considerably; there were seven trains each weekday on the Leighton to Dunstable section; the station at Stanbridgeford was open, but marked "sig" (for calls by request) for most trains; there were ten trains throughout between Dunstable and Hatfield with seven (8 on Saturdays) in addition between Luton and Dunstable. On Sundays there were two trains throughout and two more between Luton and Dunstable (Church Street). Hatfield to Hertford had secured 13 trains daily, 14 on Saturdays and two on Sundays.

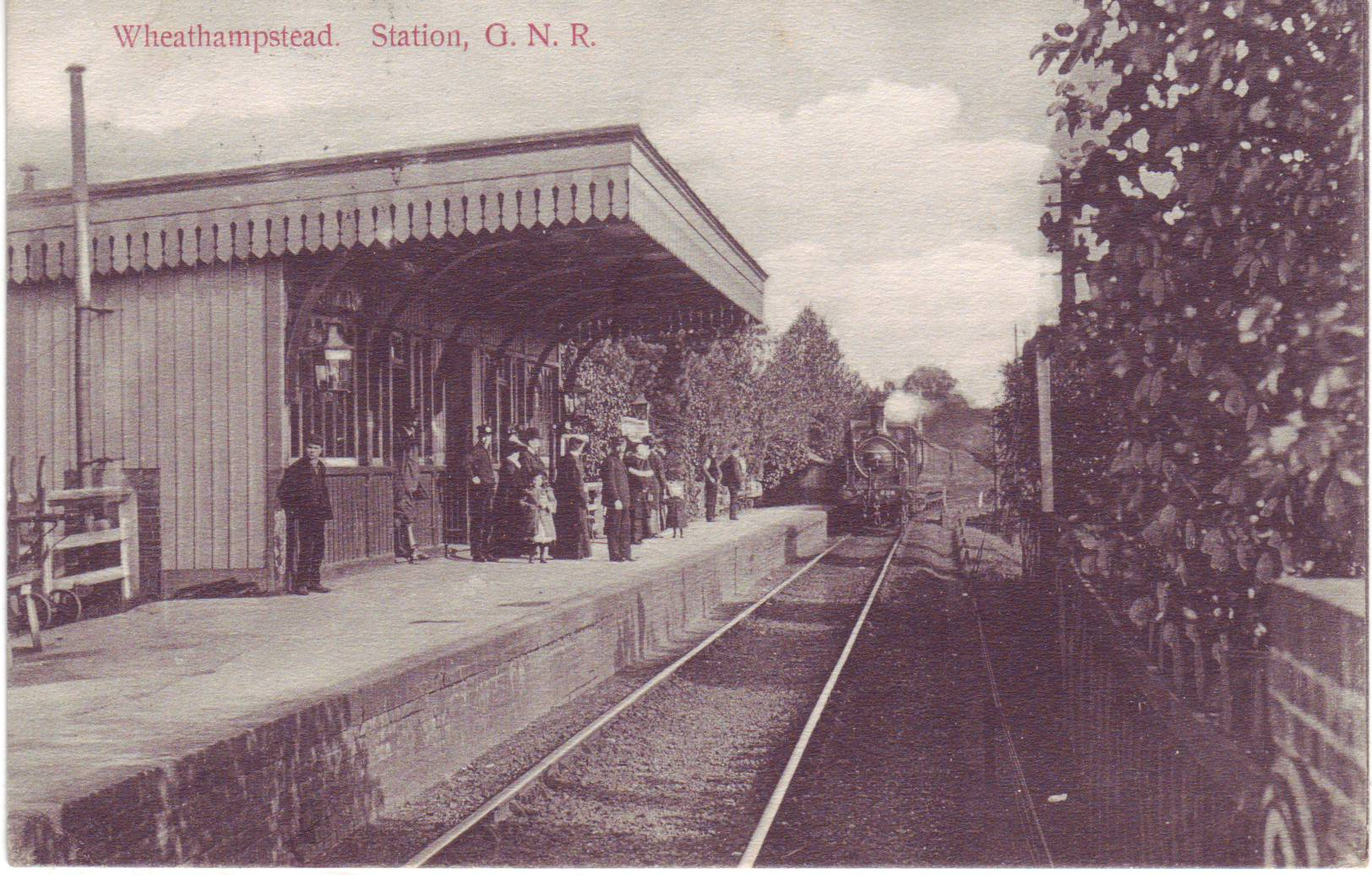
Wheathampstead railway station

After World War I the government decided to compel the main line railways of Great Britain to join one or other of four new large companies, in a process known as the "grouping" of 1923, following the Railways Act 1921. The Great Northern Railway was a constituent of the new London and North Eastern Railway.

This process was repeated in 1948 when the railways were nationalised, following the Transport Act 1947.

== Decline and closure ==
The Hertford line remained undeveloped throughout its lifetime. The opening of the direct line from Hertford to Enfield, creating the Hertford Loop Line, in 1924 abstracted all the London business from the line. The Hertford Cowbridge station was closed and trains used the new Hertford North station on the Hertford Loop.

The LNER (as successor to the GNR) persevered in providing a good train service of eight or nine trains daily on the Hertford line right up until 1939, in the hope that residential development seen elsewhere would be repeated here. Passenger trains were however withdrawn on 18 June 1951; ordinary goods traffic continued until 1962 and a household refuse train worked to Holwell Pit until total closure of the Hertford line on 23 May 1966. The line was used for the shooting of several films until 1967. Goods services continued until 1962 and most of the track was lifted in June 1967, leaving a short stretch -to serve two factories near the former Attimore Hall halt; this section was last used on 12 November 1981 and the track lifted soon afterwards.

The ex-LNWR Leighton to Dunstable branch closed on 2 July 1962.

The passenger service on the Hatfield to Dunstable section closed on 26 April 1965.

A connection was made at Luton between the Dunstable line and the Midland Main Line; it was commissioned on 1 January 1966, and the line between Luton and Blackbridge sidings, near Welwyn, was closed completely. On the same date the section between Dunstable North and Grovebury Sidings was closed, leaving only the stub at Welwyn to Blackbridge Dump, Luton to Dunstable Cement Sidings and Grovebury Sidings to Leighton Buzzard operational.

For some years, there was talk of reopening the part of the line between Luton and Dunstable, but funding never became available. A more attractive opportunity proved to be a guided busway. The Luton to Dunstable busway opened on 25 September 2013.

The Cole Green Way footpath and cycle trail follows the track of the Hertford line and forms part of Route 61 of the National Cycle Network.

== Station list ==
Stations still open are indicated in bold.

=== Hatfield to Welwyn Junction ===
- **Hatfield**; main line station; opened 7 August 1850;
- Welwyn Garden City Halt; main line halt; opened 16 August 1920; (14 August 1920 Quick) closed 20 September 1926; (15 chains)
- **Welwyn Garden City**; new main line station; opened 20 September 1926;
- Welwyn Junction; opened 1 March 1858; closed 1 September 1860.

=== Welwyn Junction to Hertford ===
- Attimore Hall Halt; opened May 1905; closed after June 1905;
- Cole Green; opened December 1858; closed 18 June 1951;
- Hatfield Hyde Halt; opened May 1905; closed June 1905;
- Hertingfordbury; opened December 1858; closed 18 June 1951;
- **Hertford North**; station on Hertford Loop; opened 2 June 1924; still open;
- Hertford; opened 1 March 1858; sometimes known as Cowbridge to distinguish from the ECR station; renamed Hertford North 1923; closed 2 June 1924;
- Hertford East Junction; divergence from Eastern Counties Hertford branch; the next station would be Ware

=== Welwyn Junction to Leighton Buzzard ===
- Ayott St Peters; opened 2 July 1877; renamed Ayot April 1878; closed 26 September 1949; goods service continued until 1 May 1963;
- Wheathampstead; opened 1 September 1860; closed 26 April 1965; goods service continued until 26 July 1965;
- Harpenden; opened 1 September 1860; renamed Harpenden East 25 September 1950; closed 26 April 1965; goods service continued until 25 November 1963;
- New Mill End; opened 1 September 1860; renamed Luton Hoo 1 December 1891; closed 26 April 1965; goods service continued until 25 November 1963;
- Luton; opened 3 May 1858; renamed Luton Bute Street 25 September 1950; closed 26 April 1965; goods service continued until 26 June 1967;
- Dunstable Church Street; opened 3 May 1858; renamed Dunstable Town 1 January 1927; closed 26 April 1965; goods service continued until 7 December 1964;
- Chaul End Halt; in use by munitions workers 1914 – 1919;
- Dunstable; LNWR station; opened 1 June 1848; relocated to form through station January 1866; renamed Dunstable North 25 September 1950; closed 26 April 1965; goods service continued until 9 October 1967;
- Stanbridgeford; opened late 1849; opened 1860; closed 2 July 1962;
- Leighton; main line station; opened 9 April 1838; renamed **Leighton Buzzard** 1911; still open.
