= Ayot =

Ayot may refer to several things in Hertfordshire, England:

- Ayot St Lawrence, a village and parish, residence of George Bernard Shaw
- Ayot St Peter, a village and parish
- Ayot Green, a hamlet
- Ayot railway station, a former station near Ayot St Peter
