= Wheathampstead railway station =

Former railway station in England

Coordinates: 51.8153°N 0.2927°W

Wheathampstead
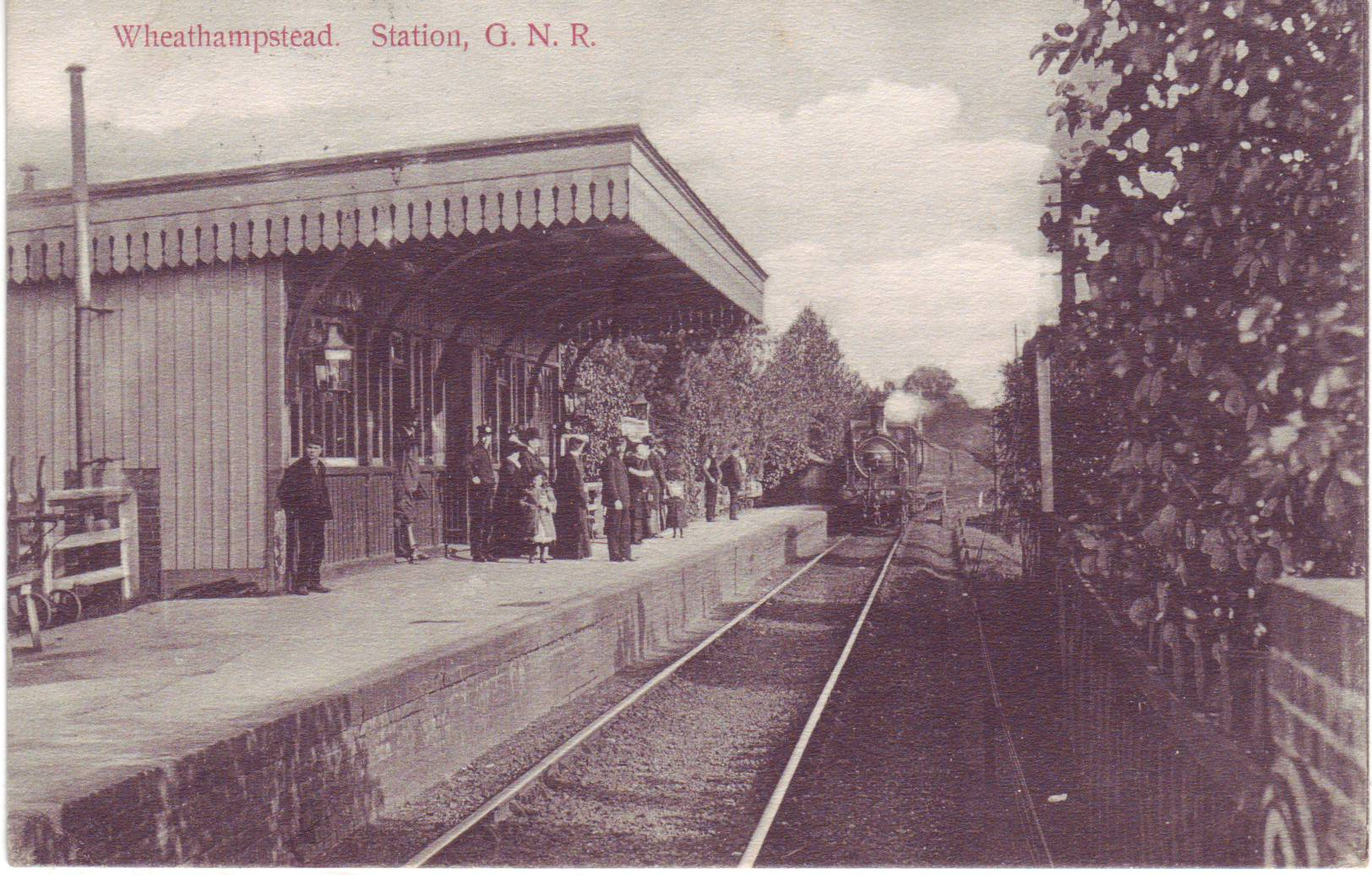
- The station in the early twentieth century

General information
- Location: Welwyn Garden City, Welwyn Hatfield; England
- Platforms: 1

Other information
- Status: Disused

History
- Original company: Hertford, Luton & Dunstable Railway
- Pre-grouping: Great Northern Railway
- Post-grouping: London and North Eastern Railway

Key dates
- 1 September 1860: Station opens
- 26 April 1965: Station closed for passengers
- 26 July 1965: Closed for freight
Location

Wheathampstead railway station was a railway station serving Wheathampstead on the Great Northern Railway branch line to Dunstable. While little of it remains now, east of Wheathampstead is the Ayot Greenway which follows what was the line towards Welwyn Garden City.

The station opened with the rest of the Hatfield section of the line on 1 September 1860. Although a small goods yard and cattle dock were built, the close proximity of the road and housing meant that it remained a single platform only, with no passing loop unlike the stations at Harpenden East and Ayot. The station closed to passengers in 1965, with the track lifted a short time afterwards.

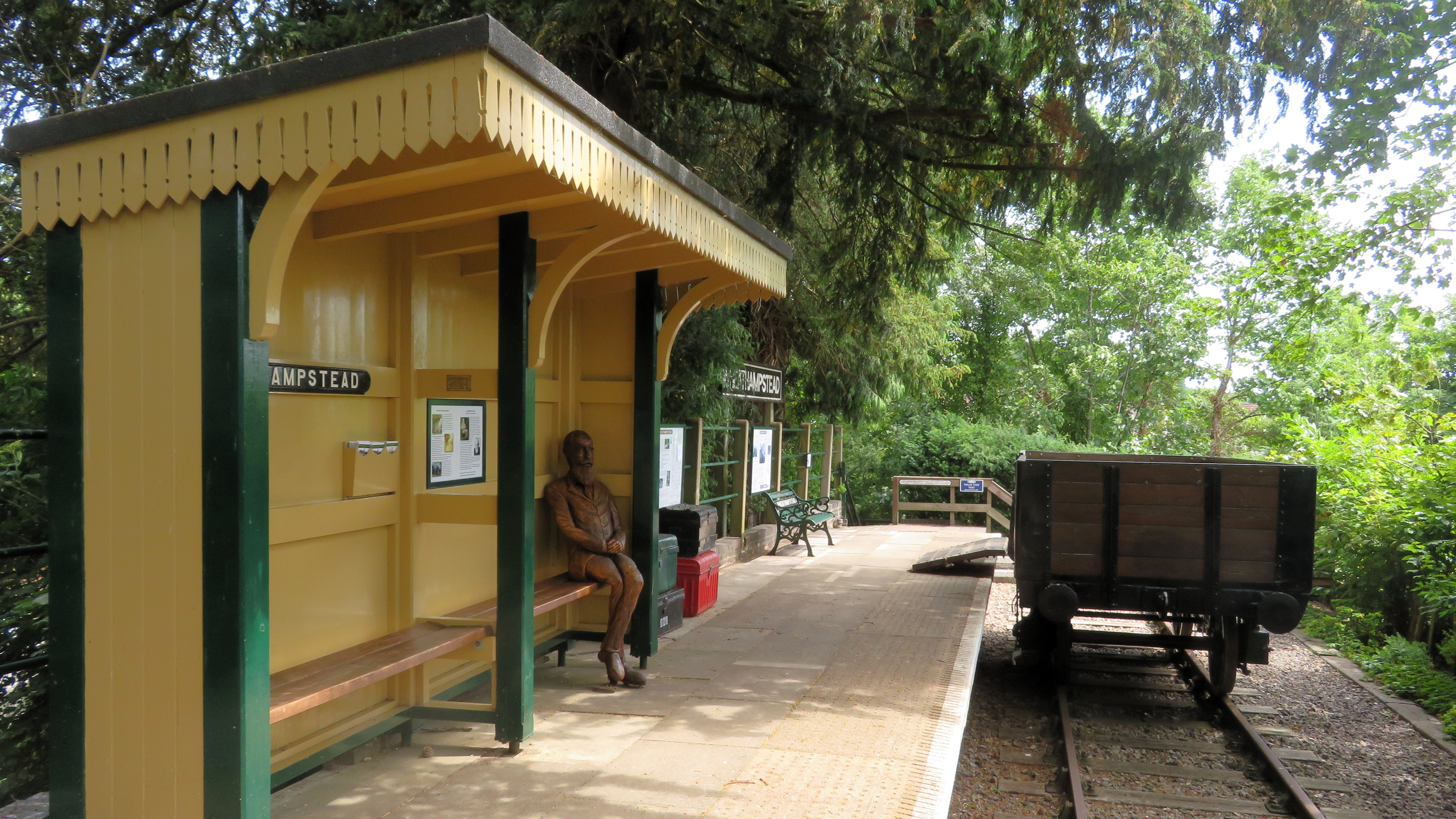
Partially restored platform

Local volunteers, with financial support from the Parish Council, local businesses and local residents, have restored the platform. A short length of railway line has been laid, together with a restored wagon, a platform shelter, information boards and a picnic table, along with a statue of George Bernard Shaw, who lived at nearby Shaw's Corner at Ayot St Lawrence between 1906 and 1950 and was known to have been a regular user of the station. The site is included in the Wheathampstead Village Centre Heritage Trail.

== Routes ==
Preceding station	Disused railways	Following station
Harpenden East; Line and station closed	Great Northern Railway; Dunstable Branch	Ayot; Line and station closed
