= Ayot Green =

Hamlet in Hertfordshire, England

Coordinates: 51°48′50″N 0°14′07″W

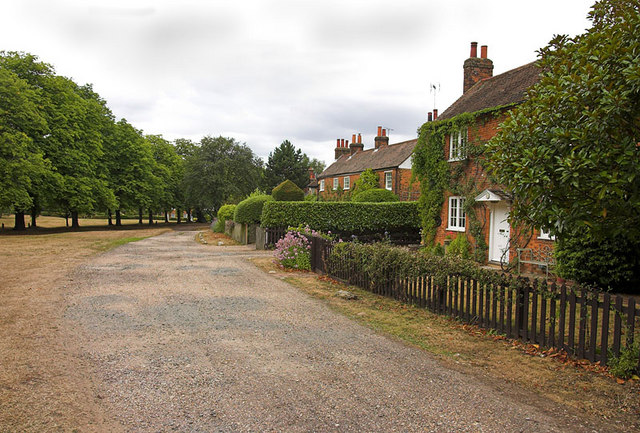

- Location within Hertfordshire
- Civil parish: Ayot St Peter
- District: Welwyn Hatfield
- Shire county: Hertfordshire
- Region: East
- Country: England
- Sovereign state: United Kingdom
- Post town: Welwyn
- Postcode district: AL6
- Police: Hertfordshire
- Fire: Hertfordshire
- Ambulance: East of England
- UK Parliament: Welwyn Hatfield

Ayot Green is a hamlet in Hertfordshire, England and is near the A1(M) Motorway, close to Welwyn Garden City. It is a typical traditional English village, centred on a village green. There are several other Ayots in the area, including Ayot St Lawrence and Ayot St Peter (where in 2011 The Census was included), and it also gives name to the rail trail called Ayot Greenway which stretches from Ayot Green to Wheathampstead.

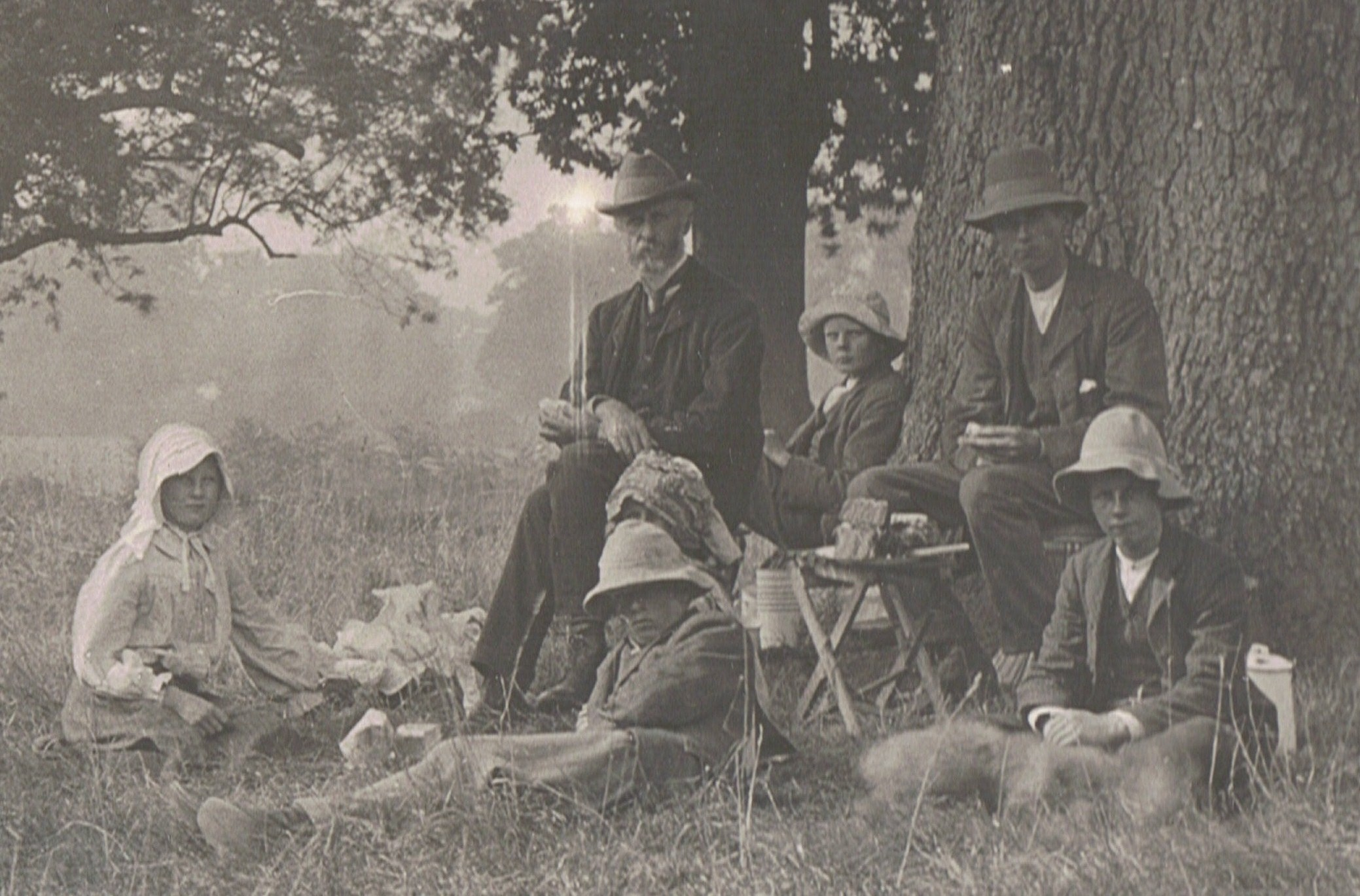
Cecil Fane de Salis and some of his children, camping holiday at Ayot Green, 4 September 1911.
