= Harpenden East railway station =

Former railway station in England

Coordinates: 51°49′22″N 0°20′29″W

Harpenden East

General information
- Location: Harpenden; England
- Platforms: 2

Other information
- Status: Disused

History
- Original company: Hertford, Luton & Dunstable Railway
- Pre-grouping: Great Northern Railway
- Post-grouping: London and North Eastern Railway

Key dates
- 1 September 1860: Opened as Harpenden
- 25 September 1950: Renamed Harpenden East
- 26 April 1965: Station closed
Location

Harpenden East was one of two stations serving the town of Harpenden, the other station which remains open being Harpenden Central. Originally named Harpenden, the East suffix was added in 1950 to distinguish it from the Midland Railway station.

== Layout ==
The line was single track with a crossing loop at Harpenden East.

An intermediate station on the Great Northern Railway branch line between Hatfield and Dunstable Town, it opened in 1860 and closed in 1965.

== Closure ==
Since closure the station has been demolished and both the site and the line in the immediate area have had housing built.

== Routes ==
| Preceding station | Disused railways | Following station |
|---|---|---|
| Luton Hoo; Line and station closed | Great Northern Railway; Dunstable Branch | Wheathampstead; Line and station closed |

== See also ==
- List of closed railway stations in Britain
