= St Helen's Church, Wheathampstead =

Church in Hertfordshire, England

Coordinates: 51°48′45″N 0°17′41″W

St Helen's Church
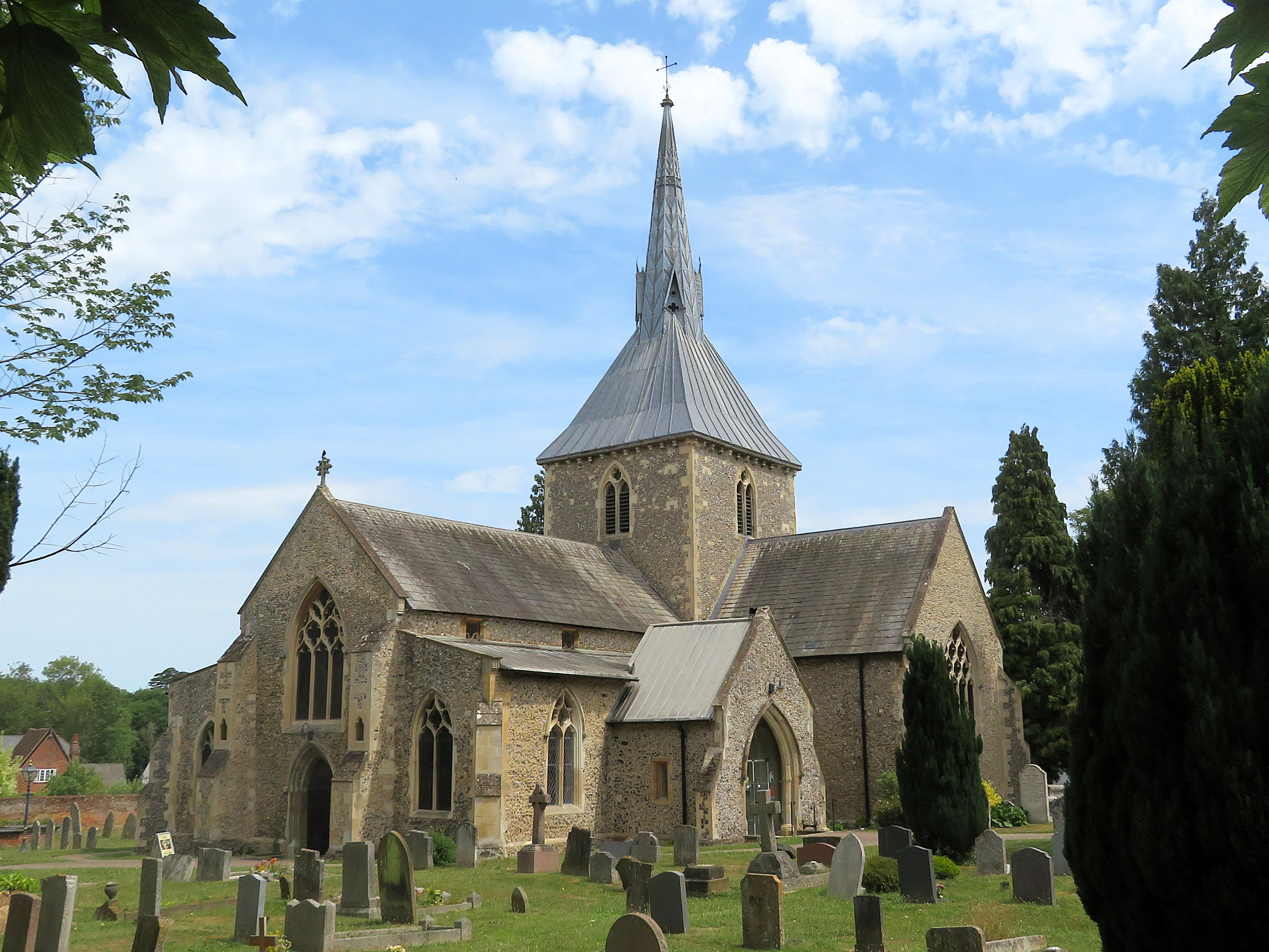
- St Helen's Church
- Denomination: Church of England
- Churchmanship: Broad Church

History
- Dedication: St Helena of Constantinople

Administration
- Province: Canterbury
- Diocese: St Albans
- Parish: Wheathampstead

Clergy
- Rector: Reverend Richard Banham

St Helen's Church is the oldest church in Wheathampstead, Hertfordshire, England, although the date of its origins is unknown. The wooden Anglo-Saxon structure pre-dated the Norman conquest of England, but no records survive which establish the date upon which it was founded. It is a Grade I listed building.

Restoration was begun during the early part of the 13th century, the original Saxon church having become dilapidated. The chancel was rebuilt and lengthened in around 1238. The east window triple lancets which still survive in the structure today date from this time as do the window and doorway with its dog-tooth decoration on the north side of the sanctuary. However, from the Lincoln Cathedral Registry—Wheathampstead fell with the See of Lincoln until 1845—the building of the central tower dates to about 1290 AD, which is the first definitive date that can be ascribed to the church.

St. Helen's is built of flint rubble, or Totternhoe clunch, with flint facings and limestone dressings. There being no stone of this type in the area, it is thought that the medieval builders used stone from the Midland quarries shipped down the Great Ouse to Bedford and from there conveyed by horse and cart along the Roman roads to Wheathampstead.

Within the church is a statue dedicated to the memory of Apsley Cherry-Garrard, the polar explorer, who is buried in the north-west corner of the churchyard. Also buried in the churchyard is British journalist, author and WWI correspondent William Beach Thomas.
