= John Black Atkins =

British journalist

John Black Atkins (5 November 1871 – 1954) was a British journalist. He served as the war correspondent for the Manchester Guardian in the Spanish–American War, the Greco-Turkish War and in the Second Boer War. He also wrote the biography of William Howard Russell.

== Life ==
He was the third son of James Bucknell Atkins of Anerley, born on 5 November 1871. He was educated at Marlborough College, matriculating in 1889 at Pembroke College, Cambridge, where he graduated B.A. in 1892 and M.A. in 1896. At Cambridge, he ran against William Beach Thomas of Oxford University when competing in the Cambridge University athletics team.

After Cambridge, Atkins joined The Manchester Guardian. He left England on 23 April 1898 as the first special correspondent of the newspaper to cover the Spanish–American War of 1898 in both Cuba and Puerto Rico. Atkins covered the Battle of El Caney and accompanied General William Rufus Shafter's army in the Capture of Santiago in Cuba. In Puerto Rico he covered the attack on Asomante Heights and interviewed General Nelson A. Miles.

Atkins was specially chosen by Charles Prestwich Scott, the then editor of the Manchester Guardian to cover the Second Boer War for his journalistic skills. Scott who sought to reflect his newspaper as a neutral force in the opposition of the war chose Atkins for his non-imperialistic views. Yet as the war progressed, Atkins tended to support the war effort sticking only to the facts.

Atkins became a friend of fellow correspondent Winston Churchill (later Prime Minister of the United Kingdom) whom he described as "slim, slightly reddish-haired, pale, lively, frequently plunging along the deck". He later published the book The Relief of Ladysmith based on his experience in the Boer War. On his return to England, he was promoted to London editor in 1901. He left The Manchester Guardian in 1907 and joined The Spectator as an assistant editor. He held that position until 1926.

== Bibliography ==
- John Black Atkins (1899). The War in Cuba, the Experiences of an Englishman with the United States Army, by John Black Atkins. With Frontispiece and Maps. Smith.
- John Black Atkins (1947). Incidents and reflections. Christophers.
- A FLOATING HOME, co-authored with Cyril Ionides. London: Chatto & Windus 1918.
