= The Outlook (British magazine) =

British weekly periodical (1898–1928)

The Outlook (sometimes just Outlook) was a British weekly periodical, sometimes described as a "review" and sometimes as a "political magazine". The strapline ran on from the title, thus The Outlook: In Politics, Life, Letters, and the Arts. It has been described as the successor to the avant-garde New Review, which had been established in 1889 by W. E. Henley and published works by writers such as Joseph Conrad, Henry James and H. G. Wells before closing in December 1897 due to low circulation figures.

Following the resignation of Henley as editor of the New Review in 1897, Outlook was launched in February 1898 by George Wyndham, who had been involved in Henley's publication. Wyndham installed Percy Hurd as editor of the new magazine. Conrad was engaged as a contributor from the outset and contributed until 1906. He described it at the time of launch:

There is a new weekly coming. Its name The Outlook; its price three pence sterling, its attitude — literary; its policy — Imperialism, tempered by expediency; its mission — to make money for a Jew; its editor Percy Hurd (never heard of him) ...

There were contemporary claims that it was financed by Cecil Rhodes, with whom Wyndham had a close relationship, and Scott Cohen notes that "balanced and thoughtful" contributions from people such as Rudyard Kipling and Max Beerbohm were secondary to "providing news and commentary on imperial affairs. More often than not, the Outlook reported on imperial politics and policy in a tone of shrill jingoism that differed markedly from the sober reflection which had characterized its predecessor."

Wyndham was forced by pressure of his work as a Member of Parliament to withdraw from involvement with the magazine in 1904. By now supporting the Tariff Reform League of Joseph Chamberlain, Outlook was bought by Charles Sydney Goldman, who had made a fortune from his involvement in mining in Transvaal. Goldman appointed James Louis Garvin as editor. Garvin employed people such as Edward Grigg, William Beach Thomas and E. C. Bentley, and also published work by Sara Jeanette Duncan. Under his guidance, the magazine supported the Conservative Party against the Liberal Party in the 1906 United Kingdom general election. He was unable to make the venture profitable and left in January 1908 to become editor of The Observer.

Outlook remained a supporter of the Conservative cause following the departure of Garvin. Although he detested the work, the poet and socialist Basil Bunting wrote reviews and articles for the magazine from February 1927 and, although inexperienced, was appointed its music critic in October of that year. He remained until the magazine ceased publication in 1928 and noted that

The Outlook told me that when I wrote sober I was too highbrow for them, so mostly I wrote drunk, and goodness knows what foolish things I may have written.

According to Bunting, the closure was due to "a libel action that it didn't want to face."
