= William Beach Thomas =

British author and war correspondent (1868–1957)

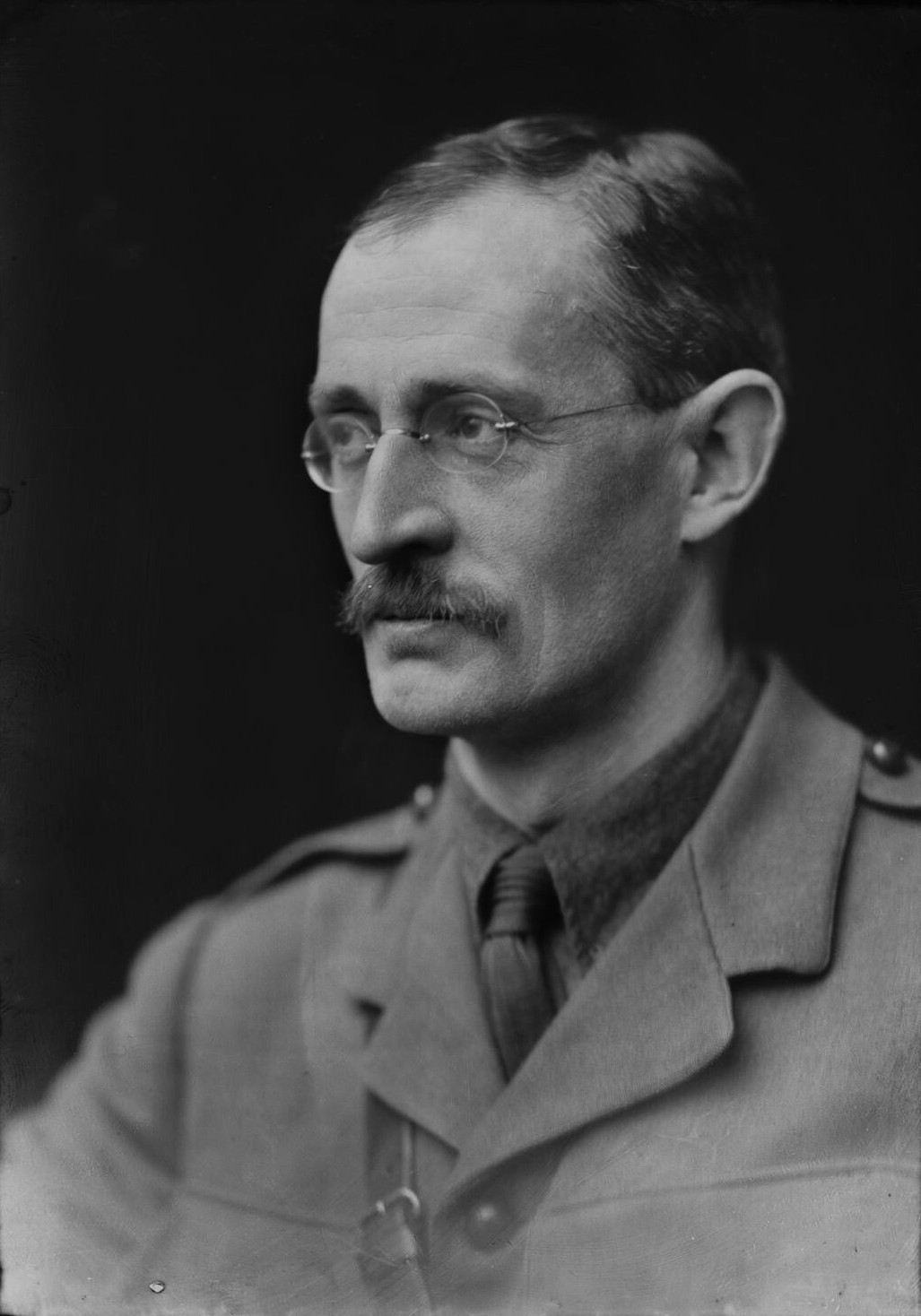
Thomas in 1917, photographed by George Charles Beresford

Sir William Beach Thomas, KBE (22 May 1868 – 12 May 1957) was a British author and journalist known for his work as a war correspondent and his writings about nature and country life.

Thomas was the son of a clergyman in Cambridgeshire. He was educated at Shrewsbury School and Christ Church, Oxford, before he embarked on a short-lived career as a schoolmaster. Finding that work unpleasant, he turned his attention to writing articles for newspapers and periodicals and began to write books.

During the early part of the First World War, Thomas defied military authorities to report news stories from the Western Front for his employer, the Daily Mail. As a result, he was briefly arrested before being granted official accreditation as a war correspondent. His reportage for the remainder of the war received national recognition, despite being criticised by some and parodied by soldiers. His book With the British on the Somme (1917) portrayed the English soldier in a very favourable light. Both France and Britain rewarded him with knighthoods after the war, but Thomas regretted some of his wartime output.

Thomas's primary interest as an adult was in rural matters. He was conservative in his views and after the Second World War feared that the Labour government regarded the countryside only from an economic perspective. He was an advocate for the creation of national parks in England and Wales and mourned the decline of traditional village society. He wrote extensively, particularly for The Observer newspaper and The Spectator, a conservative magazine. His book The English Landscape (1938) included selections from his contributions to Country Life magazine.

== Childhood and education ==
William Beach Thomas was born on 22 May 1868 in Godmanchester, in the county of Huntingdonshire, England. He was the second son of Daniel George Thomas and his wife, Rosa Beart. In 1872, his father was appointed rector of Hamerton and the countryside location of that parish inspired an affection in Beach Thomas which greatly influenced his later observational writings about natural history and rural subjects. Beach Thomas was not a hyphenated double-barrelled name; he used his middle name, Beach, as part of his name as a writer, and in the Oxford Dictionary of National Biography his name is "Thomas, William Beach".

Thomas attended Shrewsbury School from 1882. He was a keen sportsman there and was appointed huntsman to the Royal Shrewsbury School Hunt, the world's oldest cross-country running club. He continued his interest in sports after earning an exhibition to Christ Church, Oxford, in 1887 and became a blue, representing the university in various running events over several years. He became president of the Oxford University Athletics Club and played association football, rugby union, and cricket at college level. J. B. Atkins, who competed against him for the University of Cambridge athletics team, said: "With his stately height and gigantic stride, he was magnificent in action; his final effort, always, triumphant, when he saw the goal of all, the tape, waiting for him, was a sight never to be forgotten – though I had a strong reason for regretting it at the time." His exhibition was superseded by a scholarship but he was not academically successful, managing only a third-class degree.

== Early career ==
Athletic prowess and the time spent in achieving it may have contributed to Thomas's poor academic performance, but probably also assisted him in getting his first job. He taught at Bradfield College, a public school, after leaving Oxford in 1891. Although he described teaching as "uncongenial", he subsequently took a similar position at Dulwich College in 1897, where he remained until the following year. Journalism became the object of his interest; he contributed columns for The Globe, The Outlook and The Saturday Review, as well as for many other publications of which he was not a member of staff. (Note: When William Beach Thomas ended his employment with The Globe in 1903, his primary responsibility there, which was the compilation of a diary column titled By The Way, passed to P. G. Wodehouse. Thomas had taught Wodehouse at Dulwich College, supervised his involvement in the school magazine, and introduced him to The Globe in the preceding year when he needed someone to cover his duties while he took a break from work.) He also wrote a book entitled Athletics, published by Ward Lock & Co in 1901, following his contribution of a chapter titled "Athletics and Schools" to the Athletics volume in the Badminton Library series, published by Longman, Green & Co in 1900 and edited by Montague Shearman. He became a regular reviewer for The Times Literary Supplement from its formation in 1902.

The Daily Mail took on Thomas as a writer of material relating to the countryside. Lord Northcliffe, who owned the newspaper, recognised that Thomas needed to live in a rural environment if he was to perform his duties well. This understanding delighted Thomas, because it meant he could limit his visits to London. He moved to the Mimram Valley in Hertfordshire, and thereafter held Northcliffe in high regard. Thomas reported on the 78th meeting of the British Association in Dublin in 1908.

Thomas's From a Hertfordshire Cottage was published in 1908, followed by a three-volume collaboration with A. K. Collett, The English Year (1913–14). He did not entirely abandon his interest in athletics and was one of those in Britain who criticised his country's poor performance in the 1912 Olympic Games. Writing that the Olympics were by then being seen as a measure of "national vitality", he explained

We could not run, so it appeared, either long distances or short; we could not jump either broad or high; we could not throw the javelin ... The men accepted defeat as if the Olympic Games were a competition of parlour tricks in a provincial drawing-room. (Note: Later still, writing in the magazine of the Over-Seas League, Thomas expressed a preference for the amateur ethos of the British Empire Games, which were established in 1930, over the perceived professionalism and seriousness of the Olympic Games.)

== War correspondent ==
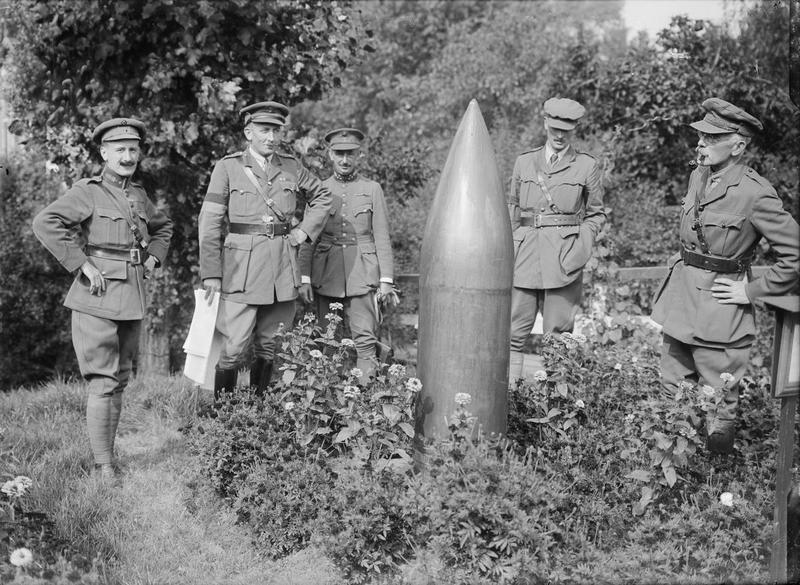
War correspondents examining a dud German 42 cm shell. Right to left: Perry Robinson (The Times), William Beach Thomas (Daily Mail) and Captain La Porte (Belgian Mission). Photograph by Ernest Brooks

The Daily Mail sent Thomas to France as a war correspondent during the First World War. Many newspapers were keen to support the war effort and to take advantage of the demand for news from the front. The British military authorities were opposed to the presence of journalists, preferring instead to control the media by issuing official press releases. Lord Kitchener in particular was opposed to their presence, having had bad experiences of journalists during the South African War. He formed a press bureau headed by F. E. Smith, and demanded that all reports be channelled through the bureau, for review by censors; the resulting output was bland and impersonal. The newspapers countered with subterfuge. Thomas was one of several journalists who managed to reach the front lines in Belgium. He was discovered there and imprisoned for some time by the British Army. He described the episode as "the longest walking tour of my life, and the queerest". Even these early unapproved reports, which consisted mostly of human interest stories because there was little opportunity for contact with the British Expeditionary Force, were censored at home owing to a paradox that Thomas described: "the censors would not publish any article if it indicated that the writer had seen what he wrote of. He must write what he thought was true, not what he knew to be true."

When the British government relented in mid-1915, having been warned by Theodore Roosevelt that the reporting limitations were affecting public opinion in the United States, (Note: In contrast to the British, the German military authorities were relatively open to journalistic endeavour, at least in part because they wanted to influence the neutral US.) Valentine Williams became the Daily Mail's first accredited war correspondent. No longer in prison, Thomas resumed his war reporting in December of the same year, when Williams enlisted in the Irish Guards. (Note: The accredited war correspondents, who included Philip Gibbs and Basil Clarke, were given the honorary rank of captain, were dressed in uniform and wore a green armband. They were supposed to be escorted by officers at all times. Smith and Higgins describe the new arrangements as having "parallels" to what is now known as embedded journalism.) As with the other accredited journalists, Thomas was paid by the War Office rather than by his newspaper, and all the correspondents were assured that they would be able to publish memoirs of their service to offset the differential between an officer's pay and that of a journalist. Thomas filed reports from places such as the Somme in a format matching that of his colleagues, who regularly played down the unpleasant aspects of the conflict, such as the nature of death. His reports were published in the Daily Mirror as well as the Daily Mail.

The soldiers derided the attempts that were made to indoctrinate them, but the British public was more susceptible. Philip Gibbs, a fellow war correspondent, noted that he and his colleagues "identified absolutely with the Armies in the field ... There was no need of censorship in our despatches. We were our own censors." The journalistic support for the cause was appreciated by military commanders such as Douglas Haig, who saw the propaganda generated by the correspondents as an integral part of the Allies' efforts. Haig eventually went so far as to ask Gibbs and Thomas to produce his own weekly news-sheet. Public opinion at home may have been mollified, even uplifted, by the efforts of the correspondents, but the morale of the troops was not, despite the high demand among them for newspapers from home. (Note: Nicholas Hiley explains the paradox of the troops' high demand for newspapers from home despite their disdain for the war correspondents: "although the frontline soldiers had a good view of the fighting, they had a poor view of the war and welcomed the broader perspective given by the London press". Their name for the Daily Mail was Daily Liar.) One soldier, Albert Rochester, was court martialled for attempting to send to the Daily Mail a letter that stated the realities as he saw them and was critical of Thomas's work, noting the "ridiculous reports regarding the love and fellowship existing between officers and men". Thomas himself later regretted his wartime reports from the Somme, saying, "I was thoroughly and deeply ashamed of what I had written for the good reason that it was untrue ... the vulgarity of enormous headlines and the enormity of one's own name did not lessen the shame."

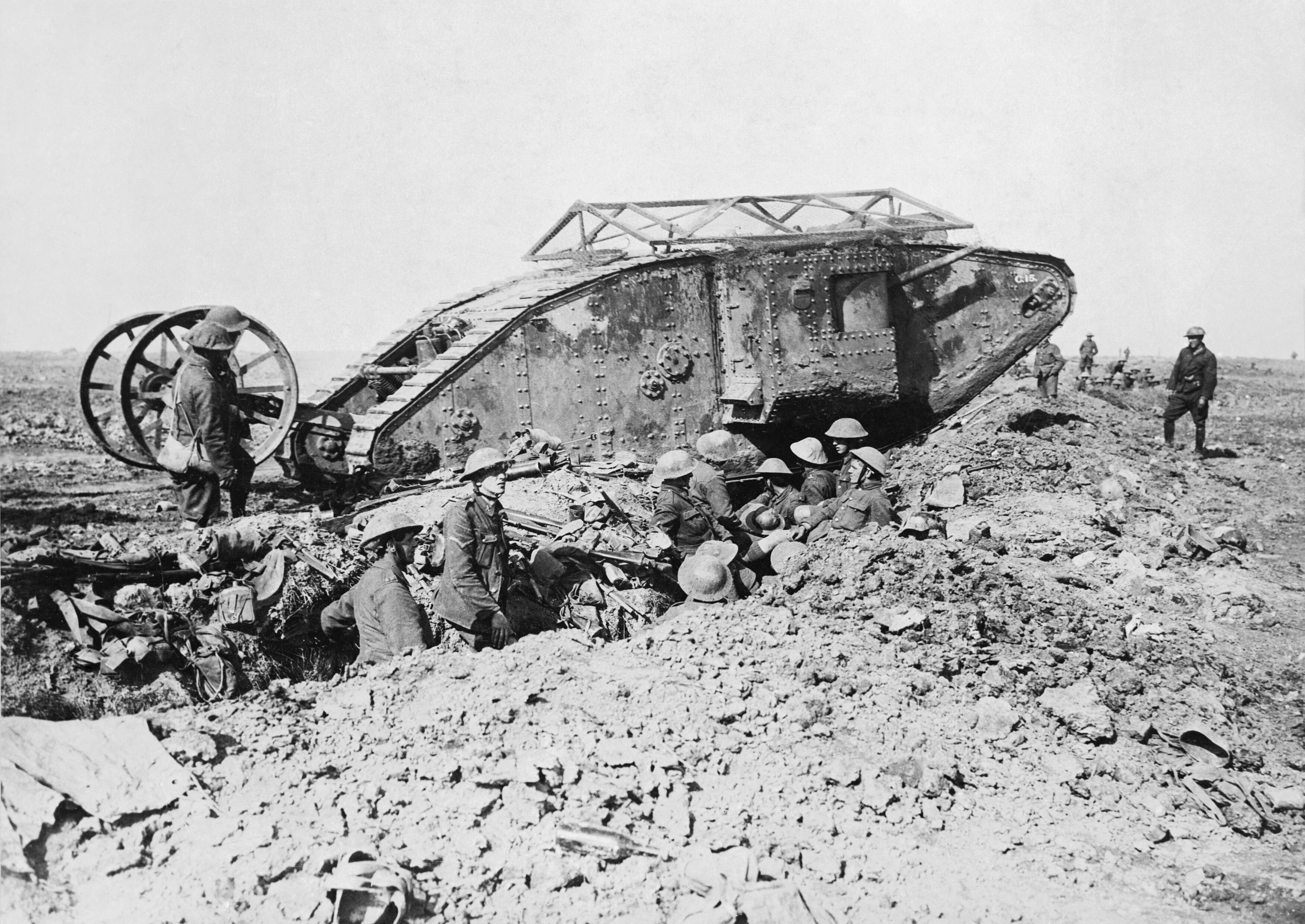
British Mark I male tank at the Somme, September 1916. Photograph by Ernest Brooks.

Northcliffe's brother, Lord Rothermere, expressed frustration with the war correspondents: "They don't know the truth, they don't speak the truth, and we know that they don't." Stephen Badsey, a historian who specialises in the First World War, has noted that their situation was not easy as they "found themselves as minor players trapped in a complicated hierarchical structure dominated by politicians, generals and newspaper owners". Thomas received particular opprobrium. Paul Fussell, the historian, describes him as "notoriously fatuous" during the war period. Peter Stothard, editor of The Times between 1992 and 2002, describes him as "a quietly successful countryside columnist and literary gent who became a calamitous Daily Mail war correspondent" and believes that he may have been the inspiration for the character of William Boot in Evelyn Waugh's novel Scoop. (Note: Another potential model for the character of William Boot was Bill Deedes.) John Simpson, a war correspondent, describes Thomas as "charming but unlovable" and thinks that the soldiers despised him more than they did the other British war correspondents, even though all those journalists were playing a similar disinformation role. They considered his writing to be a trivialisation of the realities of war, jingoistic, pompous and particularly self-promoting, often giving the reader an impression that he was writing from the battlefield when in fact he was being fed information of dubious value by the military authorities while based in their headquarters.

An example of Thomas's reporting is as follows:

Soon after 6 pm the spasmodic barking of the night-time cannonade (now normal in spite of its intensity) gave place to a "kettle-drum bombardment". The "fun" was "fast and furious" and two minutes after the orchestra opened our men leaped from their trenches. They were not unaccompanied. In spite of the harvest moon, we had brought up a certain number of armoured cars which the moonlight transformed into fantastic monsters ... "Autos blindés" is the French term. They looked like blind creatures emerged from the primeval slime. To watch one crawling round a battered wood in the half-light was to think of "the Jabberwock, with eyes of flame" that: "Came whiffling through the tulgey wood,/ And burbled as it came!" (Note: This report was referred to not only in the Daily Mail but also in the Daily Mirror, Illustrated London News and his book With the British on the Somme. The lines quoted by Thomas are from Jabberwocky, a nonsense poem in Lewis Carroll's Through the Looking-Glass (1871).)

Thomas's style was parodied using the by-line of Teech Bomas in the Wipers Times, a trench newspaper, but he was lauded by the readers back in Britain. One example from the Wipers Times, based on a report published in the Daily Mail of 18 September 1916, reads:

In the grey and purple light of a September morn [the first tanks used in war] went over. Like great prehistoric monsters, they leapt and skipped with joy when the signal came. It was my great good fortune to be a passenger on one of them. How can I clearly relate what happened? All is one chaotic mingling of joy and noise. No fear! How could one fear anything in the belly of a perambulating, peripatetic progolodymythorus. Wonderful, epic, on we went, whilst twice a minute the 17in. gun on the roof barked out its message of defiance. At last, we were fairly in amongst the Huns. They were around us in millions and in millions they died ... With a triumphant snort we went through Bapaume pushing over the church in a playful moment and then steering a course for home, feeling that our perspiring proglodomyte had thoroughly enjoyed its run over the disgruntled, discomfited, disembowelled earth. And so to rest in its lair ready for the morrow and what that morrow might hold. I must get back to the battle.

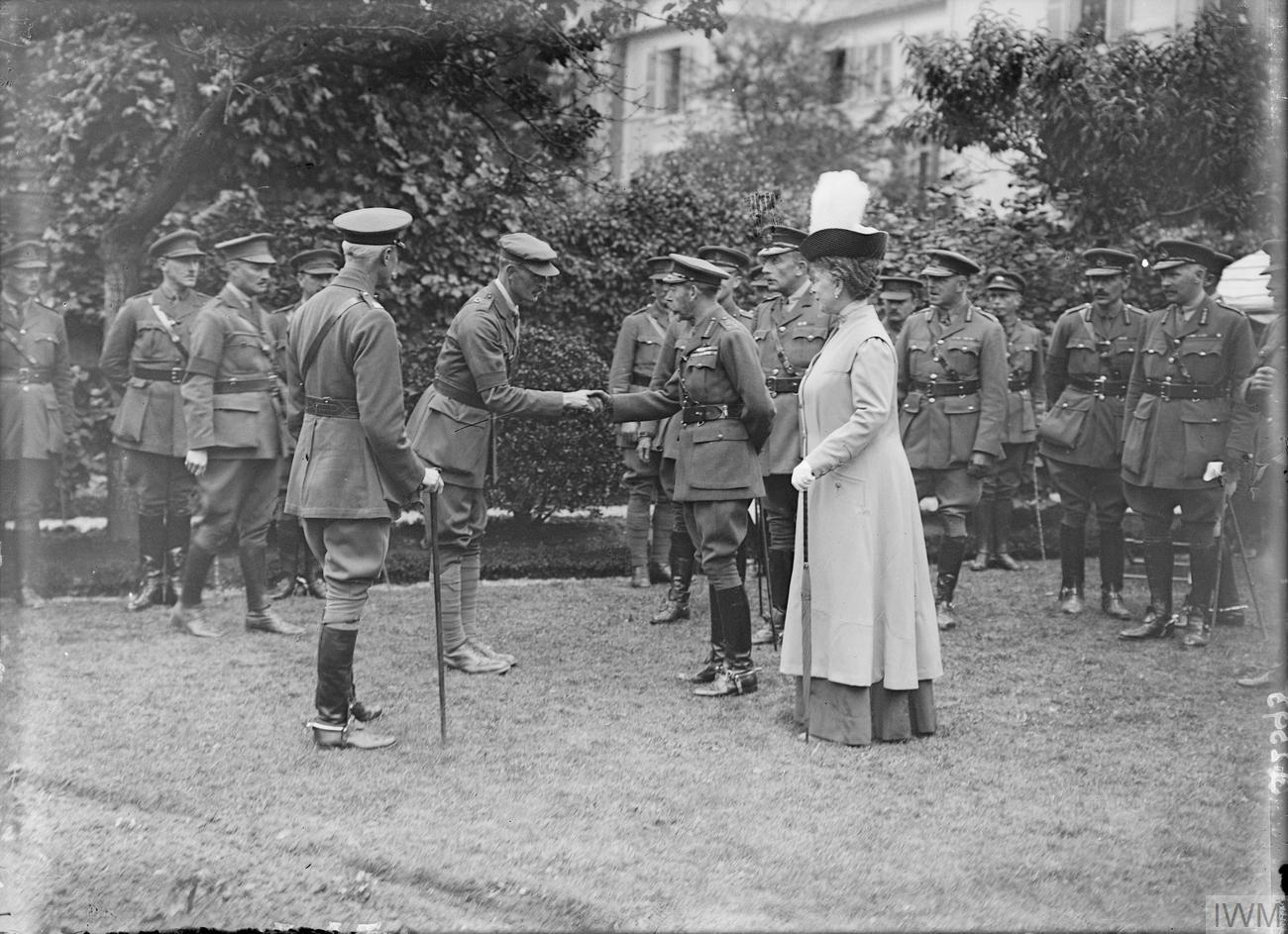
William Beach Thomas (left), Daily Mail war correspondent, being presented to King George V at Abbeville on 9 June 1917. Photograph by Ernest Brooks.

In 1918, William Beach Thomas published a book based on his wartime experiences, entitled With the British on the Somme. It was a favourable depiction specifically of the English soldier, somewhat contrary to the official line that tried to emphasise that this was a British war rather than an English one. A review in The Times Literary Supplement noted that Thomas

rightly emphasised the feats of the English soldier ... as distinct from the Scot, the Irishman or the Colonial. This is as it should be, for the average newspaper reader of late months, even years, has been saturated with epics of different Colonials, Irish regiments, and Kilted Companies ... the plain Thomas Atkins [has been] overlooked to a great extent for far too long.

In 1918, Northcliffe asked Thomas to travel to the US. According to Thomas, the rationale for the trip was that "he didn't know what the Americans were doing, and they did not know what we were thinking". He met with influential people such as Henry Ford, Theodore Roosevelt, and Woodrow Wilson during this visit.

William Beach Thomas sometimes accompanied King George V and the Prince of Wales on their visits to France, noting on one occasion a situation he considered reminiscent of Henry II and Thomas Becket:

We were walking to see a new heavy howitzer installed in its camouflage in an open grove. About us ran and skipped, appeared and disappeared, round this tree and that, the conscientious wielder of a cinema. The thing got more and more on the Prince's nerves until the irritation was irrepressible, and he turned to me and said with a sort of angry humour: "Will no-one kill that photographer?"

Thomas's war work led to official recognition, as it did for many of the correspondents and newspaper owners; France made him a Chevalier of the Legion of Honour in 1919 and he was appointed a Knight Commander of the Order of the British Empire (KBE) in 1920. In 1923, Gibbs said of the KBE, which he too received: "I was not covetous of that knighthood and indeed shrank from it so much that I entered into a compact with Beach Thomas to refuse it. But things had gone too far, and we could not reject the title with any decency." This quandary was caused by realisation of the gulf between what they had reported and what had actually happened.

== Later years ==
After the war, Thomas stayed in Germany until 1919 and returned there in 1923 at the time of the Occupation of the Ruhr. He also undertook a tour of the world for the Daily Mail and The Times in 1922. His main focus returned to his lifelong interest in matters of the countryside, notably in his writings for The Observer from 1923 to 1956. (Note: Thomas had worked under James Louis Garvin at The Outlook and it was Garvin who brought him to The Observer.) Thomas was also a regular contributor of notes on nature, gardening and country life to The Spectator for almost thirty years, with some short breaks between 1935 and 1941, when H. E. Bates took over responsibility. In 1928 Thomas produced a history of the magazine under the title of The Story of the 'Spectator', in commemoration of its centenary. He wrote many more books and articles in his later years, as well as two autobiographical books: A Traveller in News (1925) and The Way of a Countryman (1944). Fond of peppering quotations throughout his writing, his style was considered to be clear but his hand was poor; a profile of him in The Observer said "perhaps he gave less pleasure to those who had to decipher his handwriting. Rarely has more limpid English been conveyed in a script more obscure."

George Orwell wrote in the Manchester Evening News:

It is uncertain whether the general public would think of Sir William Beach Thomas primarily as a war correspondent or as a naturalist, but he is in no doubt about the matter himself. The world, as he sees it, really centres round the English village, and round the trees and hedges of that village rather than the houses and the people.

Even as traditional English village life was in collapse, Thomas saw the romanticised paternalism and general life of the village as the epitome of English society and equivalent to anything that might be found elsewhere in the world. He said that one of the aspects of village life he admired was that "comparative wealth [there] is admired, not envied". He also viewed the natural world as something to be wondered at rather than scientifically examined. In his last column for The Spectator, written in September 1950, he wrote:

The country scene is a department of art, not of science. The essential is the discovery of beauty, not of knowledge. Science comes second, and a bad second, to art. We do not listen to the nightingale in order to find out whether his song is erotic or polemic. We listen for the pleasure of the mood that the song and the scene engender. Flight matters more than its mechanics. The prime value of knowledge itself is to enlarge the circle of wonder. The chronicler does a better deed if he helps someone to enjoy the country more than if he botanises or ornithologises or entomologises or meteorologises.

In his desire to encourage a love of the countryside, especially during the Second World War, William Beach Thomas was similar to other writers on rural matters, such as G. M. Trevelyan and H. J. Massingham. He described Massingham as "perhaps the best of all present writers on Rural England" and considered him among those writers who were "so fond of the past that they seem sometimes almost to despair of the future". Malcolm Chase, a historian, says that these authors, including Thomas himself, advocated an ultra-conservative, socially reactionary and idealistic philosophy that formed an important part of a national debate about the future of the land and agriculture. This attitude was coupled with an increasing public interest in pastimes such as cycling, motoring and walking; it was supported by the publication of popular, fairly cheap and colourful articles, books and maps that catered both to those pursuing such interests and those who were concerned about conservation and the effects of the influx of urban and suburban visitors. John Musty, in his comparative literary review of the works of Thomas and Massingham, believes that Thomas had a more "gentle touch" than Massingham, whose writings have "frequently been judged as narrow and reactionary"; he quotes Thomas as saying of the likes of Massingham that they "preach an impossible creed, albeit an attractive one".

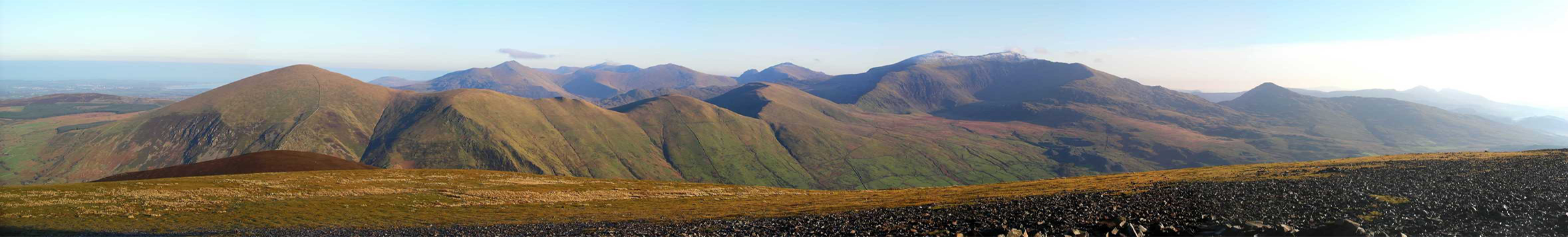
Panorama of some of the Snowdon Massif including Snowdon (centre right) taken from Mynydd Mawr. The Glyderau are visible in the distance. William Beach Thomas supported moves to make Snowdonia a national park.

Much of one of Thomas's books, The English Landscape (1938), had previously appeared in various issues of Country Life magazine, and in part echoed concerns raised by Clough Williams-Ellis in works such as his England and the Octopus (1928). Williams-Ellis believed that building on greenfield land was too great a price to pay for socio-economic progress. Thomas argued in favour of protecting open spaces by creating national parks, for which he thought that the coastline would be the most suitable candidate. He stressed the relationship between the people and the land and saw a need for planning control to manage human ingress into areas that remained mostly untouched. In 1934 he supported the Nature Lovers Association in its appeal to make the mountainous Snowdonia region, near the coast of North Wales, such an entity. (Note: The legal framework for national parks became law in 1949; Snowdonia was designated as one in October 1951.) He also supported the Commons, Open Spaces and Footpaths Preservation Society.

In 1931 Thomas lamented the inability of the National Farmers Union of England and Wales to hold up what he saw as the decline of the farming industry. In A Countryman's Creed (1946) he harked back to a lost world, perhaps even a world that was more of his imagination than it was ever real. As F. R. Leavis had done before him, Thomas sought a rural revival to curtail what he saw as the rapid changes to traditional ways of life that had been evident in particular in the aftermath of the First World War and which were now ideologically challenged following the substantial victory of the socialist Labour Party in the 1945 general election. The new government was a threat to Thomas's view of the world because, in the words of the literary critic Robert Hemmings, it saw the countryside "as merely a giant dairy and granary for the city".

Thomas was opposed to the use of the toothed steel trap for catching rabbits, supporting the RSPCA in its efforts to outlaw the device and noting that it inflicted unnecessary pain and was indiscriminate in nature, sometimes trapping other animals, such as domesticated cattle and pet dogs.

== Personal life and death ==
William Beach Thomas married Helen Dorothea Harcourt, a daughter of Augustus George Vernon Harcourt, in April 1900, and with her had three sons and a daughter. Their second son, Michael Beach Thomas, was killed in 1941 while serving as a naval officer during the Second World War. (Note: The Commonwealth War Graves Commission records state that Lieutenant-Commander Michael Beach Thomas died on 5 April 1941 at the age of 35. He was among those lost when the mooring vessel HMS Buffalo, operating out of Singapore, hit a mine during a salvage operation and sank. An obituary for Michael Beach Thomas was published in The Times. He is commemorated on the Plymouth Naval Memorial, and on the war memorial in his parents' home village.) Helen survived her husband, who died on 12 May 1957 at their home, "High Trees", Gustardwood, Wheathampstead, Hertfordshire. (Note: William Beach Thomas had bought a house in Wheathampstead in 1923. That fifteenth-century building, now Grade II listed and variously known as Wheathampstead Place or Place Farm, had previously been owned by two British Prime Ministers, Lord Melbourne and Lord Palmerston. He had moved from it by 1932. The house in which he died appears to have been built for him in the 1930s.) He was buried in the village churchyard at St Helen's Church. Among the obituaries of William Beach Thomas were those published in Nature and The Times.

== Books ==
Aside from his journalism, Thomas wrote and contributed to many books, all published in London and some also in New York. These include:

- Athletics at School (chapter in Athletics, ed. Montague Shearman, Longmans, Green & Co.: 1898)
- Athletics (Ward, Lock & Co.: 1901)
- The Road to Manhood (G. Allen: 1904)
- On Taking a House (Edward Arnold: 1905)
- From a Hertfordshire Cottage (Alston Rivers: 1908)
- Preface to C. D. McKay's The French Garden: A Diary and Manual of Intensive Cultivation (Associated Newspapers: 1908, reprinted as The French Garden In England, 1909)
- Our Civic Life (Alston Rivers: 1908)
- The English Year (three volumes, co-authored with A. K. Collett; T. C. & E. C. Jack, 1913–14); Autumn and Winter; Spring; Summer
- With the British on the Somme (Methuen: 1917)
- Birds Through The Year (co-authored with A. K. Collett; T. C. & E. C. Jack, 1922)
- An Observer's Twelvemonth (Collins: 1923)
- A Traveller in News (Chapman and Hall: 1925)
- England Becomes Prairie (Ernest Benn: 1927)
- The Story of the 'Spectator' (Methuen: 1928)
- The Happy Village (Ernest Benn: 1928)
- Events of the Great War (G. Routledge & Sons: 1930)
- A Letter to My Dog (G. Routledge & Sons: 1931)
- Why the Land Dies (Faber & Faber: 1931)
- Introduction to Land and Life: The Economic National Policy for Agriculture (Viscount Astor and Keith Murray., Gollancz: 1932)
- The Yeoman's England (A. Maclehose & Co.: 1934)
- Village England (A. Maclehose & Co.: 1935)
- The Squirrel's Granary: A Countryman's Anthology (A. Maclehose & Co.: 1936, republished by A. & C. Black in 1942 as A Countryman's Anthology)
- Hunting England: A Survey of the Sport and of Its Chief Grounds Etc (B. T. Batsford: 1936)
- The Home Counties (chapter in Britain and the Beast, ed. Clough Williams-Ellis, B. T. Batsford: 1937)
- The English Landscape (Country Life: 1938)
- The Way of a Countryman (M. Joseph: 1944)
- The Poems of a Countryman (M. Joseph: 1945)
- A Countryman's Creed (M. Joseph: 1946)
- In Praise of Flowers (Evans Bros.: 1948)
- The English Counties Illustrated (Odhams: 1948, ed. C. E. M. Joad; chapters on Hertfordshire and Huntingdonshire)
- The Way of a Dog (M. Joseph: 1948)
- Hertfordshire (R. Hale: 1950)
- A Year in the Country (A. Wingate: 1950)
- Gardens (Burke: 1952)
- Introduction to The New Forest and Hampshire in Pictures (Odhams: 1952)
