= Ayot railway station =

Disused railway station in Hertfordshire, England

Coordinates: 51.81503°N 0.22935°W

Ayot
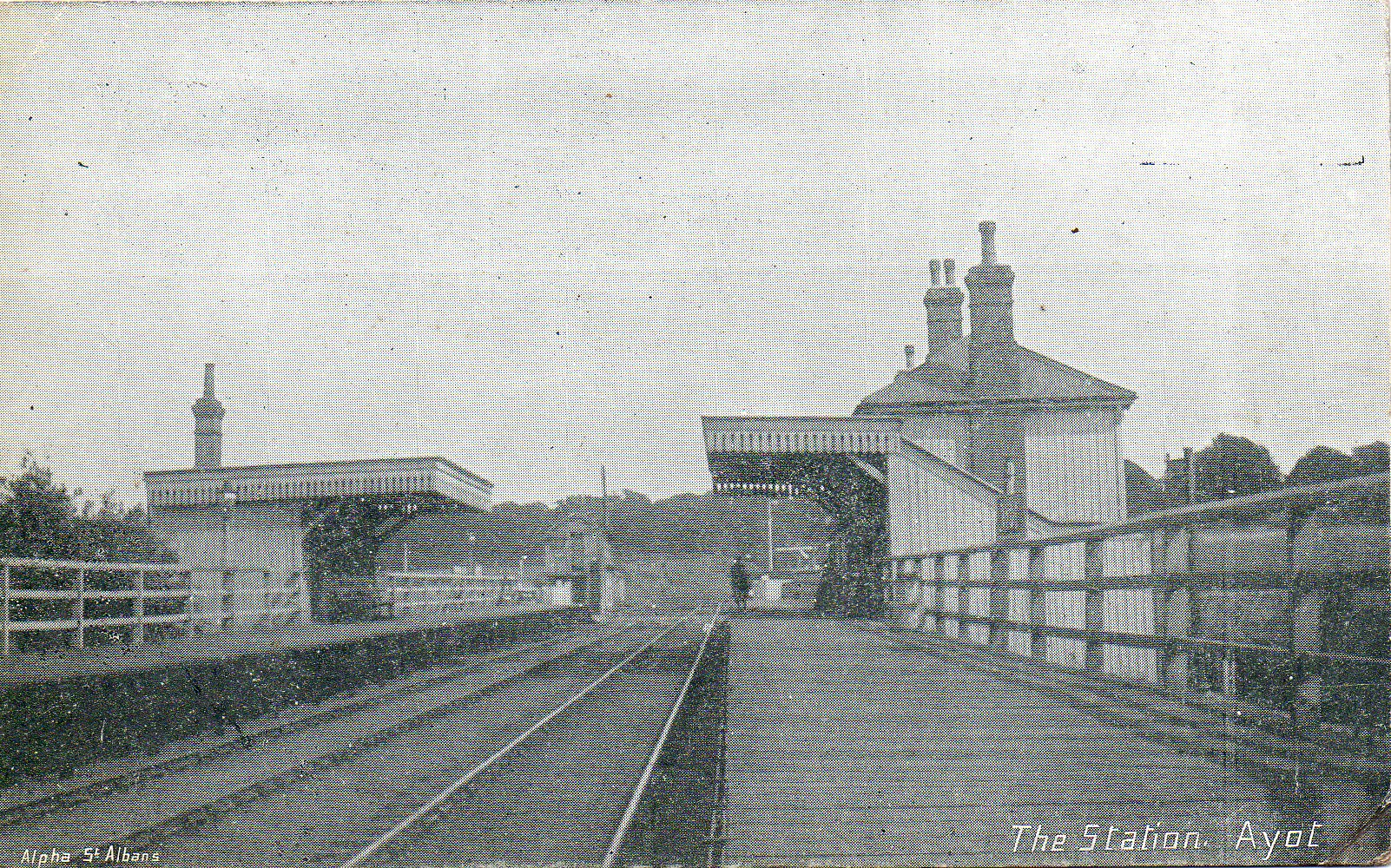
- The station in the early twentieth century

General information
- Location: Welwyn Garden City, Welwyn Hatfield; England
- Platforms: 2

Other information
- Status: Disused

History
- Original company: Great Northern Railway
- Pre-grouping: Great Northern Railway
- Post-grouping: London and North Eastern Railway

Key dates
- 2 July 1877: Station opens as Ayott St Peters
- 1 April 1878: Station renamed Ayott
- October 1878: Station renamed Ayot
- 26 July 1948: Station closes to passengers
- 1 May 1963: closed for goods traffic
Location

Ayot was a railway station serving Ayot St Peter near Welwyn Garden City in Hertfordshire, England. It was on the branch line to Dunstable.

== History ==
Opened by the Great Northern Railway, it became part of the London and North Eastern Railway during the Grouping of 1923. The station then passed on to British Railways on nationalisation in 1948 but was closed by British Railways that year when the station was destroyed by fire and never rebuilt.

Preceding station	Disused railways	Following station
Wheathampstead	Great Northern Railway; Dunstable Branch	Welwyn Garden City

== The site today ==
The trackbed is now part of a local rail trail called Ayot Greenway.
