= HM Prison Leyhill =

Category D men's prison

HMP Leyhill
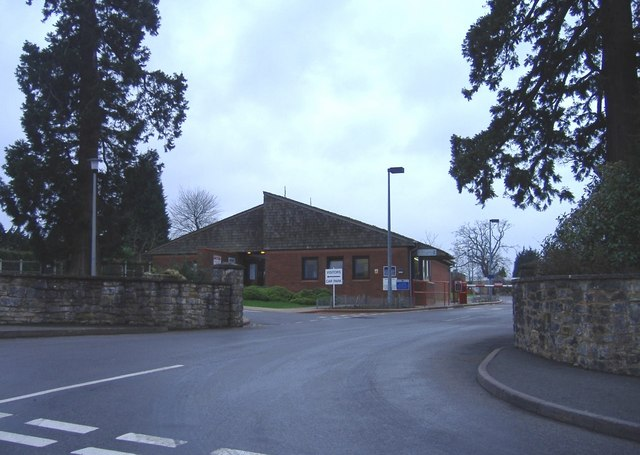
- Leyhill prison
- Interactive map of HMP Leyhill
- Location: Cromhall, Gloucestershire; 51.6283°N 2.4388°W
- Security class: Adult male/category D
- Population: 532 (June 2009)
- Managed by: HM Prison Services
- Governor: Steve Hodson
- Website: Leyhill at justice.gov.uk

HM Prison Leyhill is a category D men's prison located in the parish of Cromhall in Gloucestershire, England. His Majesty's Prison Service operates Leyhill Prison.

== History ==
Leyhill Prison was originally a United States military hospital built for the Second World War. The site was converted into a prison in 1946, with inmates originally housed in hutted accommodation. The prison was rebuilt in the late 1970s to early 1980s, and in 1986, prisoners were re-housed in new living accommodation. In 2002, new accommodation units were added to increase the prison's capacity.

In a March 2002 report, Her Majesty's Chief Inspector of Prisons criticised Leyhill for failing to prepare inmates for release, stating that too little was being done to help inmates get ready for the pressures of life outside. The report also claimed that staff needed a clearer idea of their role at the prison.

In May 2006, it was revealed that more than one inmate a week was absconding from Leyhill. Statistics showed that 66 prisoners had left Leyhill in the 2005/06 financial year. The Prison Service claimed the number of escapes was down to population pressures in the UK prison estate, with less trustworthy prisoners being transferred to open prisons like Leyhill.

== The prison today ==
Leyhill is a prison for adult male prisoners of category D status, meaning that either a parole board or the Prison Service has deemed them suitable for open conditions.

Leyhill was strongly criticised for failing to manage the risks posed by this population properly and not assisting enough with effective resettlement.

Leyhill runs a variety of courses designed to help prisoners prepare for release. These include a general joinery woodwork shop (offering City & Guilds qualifications in woodwork), a printing shop, a commercial laundry; industrial cleaning and car-valeting training, waste management and recycling training, and forklift truck and tractor training.

The prison's farms and gardens also provide work and training for prisoners on a 55-hectare estate, including extensive ornamental grounds. There is a nationally important arboretum run in conjunction with the Forestry Commission; it is often open to the public.

As an open prison, several prisoners at Leyhill are placed in the community to complete work and training placements. These placements are designed to improve a prisoner's chance of successful resettlement in the community on release.

In November 2016, three potentially violent prisoners absconded.

== Notable inmates ==
- Bristol City footballers Steve Brooker, Bradley Orr and David Partridge spent their short prison sentences at Leyhill for their part in a nightclub brawl.
- Elmore Davies, former head of drug squad Merseyside Police given 5 years for corruption.
- Ali Dizaei, the former Metropolitan Police commander
- Charlie Elphicke, former Conservative MP who was jailed for sexual assault. He was released in 2021.
- Leslie Grantham, served the final part of a sentence for murder at Leyhill before being released in 1977 and going on to land himself numerous roles as a TV actor, most notably as Den Watts in EastEnders
- Chris Huhne, former cabinet minister and Liberal Democrat MP for Eastleigh, jailed for perverting the course of justice
- Patrick Mackay, serial killer.
- Luke McCormick, former Plymouth Argyle captain and England youth goalkeeper, served seven years and four months for two counts of death by dangerous driving and one count of driving/attempting to drive whilst exceeding the prescribed limit (Road Traffic Act 1988) which resulted in the deaths of 10-year-old Aaron Peak and 8-year-old Ben Peak. He was sentenced at Stoke-on-Trent Crown Court.
- T. Dan Smith, the Newcastle politician disgraced by the Poulson affair (it was Smith who encouraged Grantham to go into acting on his release)
- Fred West, serial killer imprisoned for petty theft from 1970 to 1971

== Film and television links ==
- Greenfingers, a 2000 film is loosely based on the story about prisoners from Leyhill and their award-winning entries into the Chelsea Flower Show.
- In The Gentlemen (2024 TV series), Robert "Bobby" Glass is shown to be incarcerated at the facility.
