= Cromhall =

Village and civil parish in Gloucestershire, United Kingdom

Coordinates: 51°37′N 2°26′W

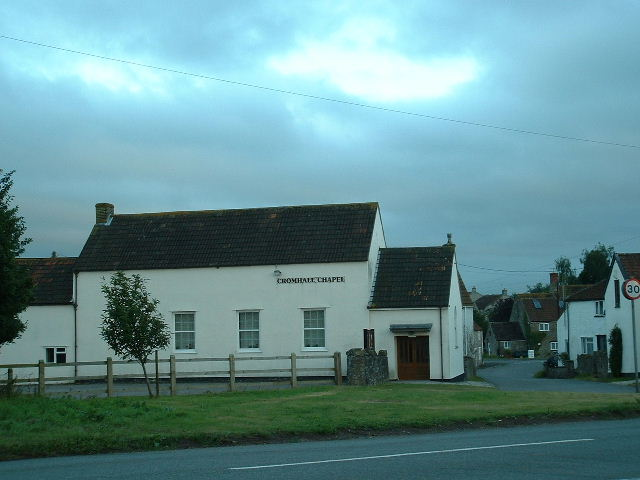
Cromhall Chapel

Cromhall is a village in South Gloucestershire, England. It is located between Bagstone and Charfield on the B4058, and also borders Leyhill. The parish population taken at the 2011 census was 1,231.

== Location ==
Cromhall is about 1 mile (1.6 km) from Falfield on the A38 Tortworth turn-off. The village is spread out and about 1 mile long, being one of the longest villages in England, although not as long as Falfield.

== Facilities ==
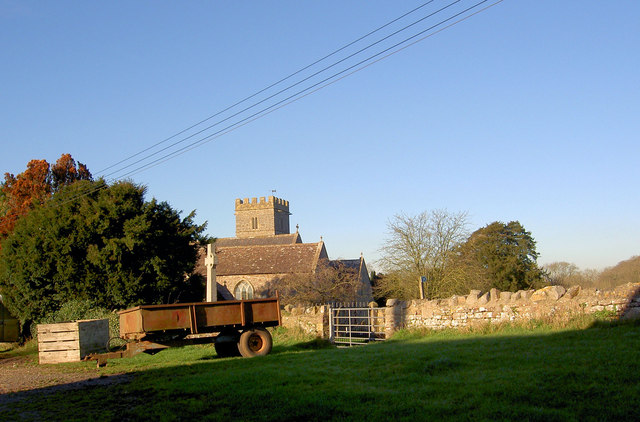
St Andrew's Church

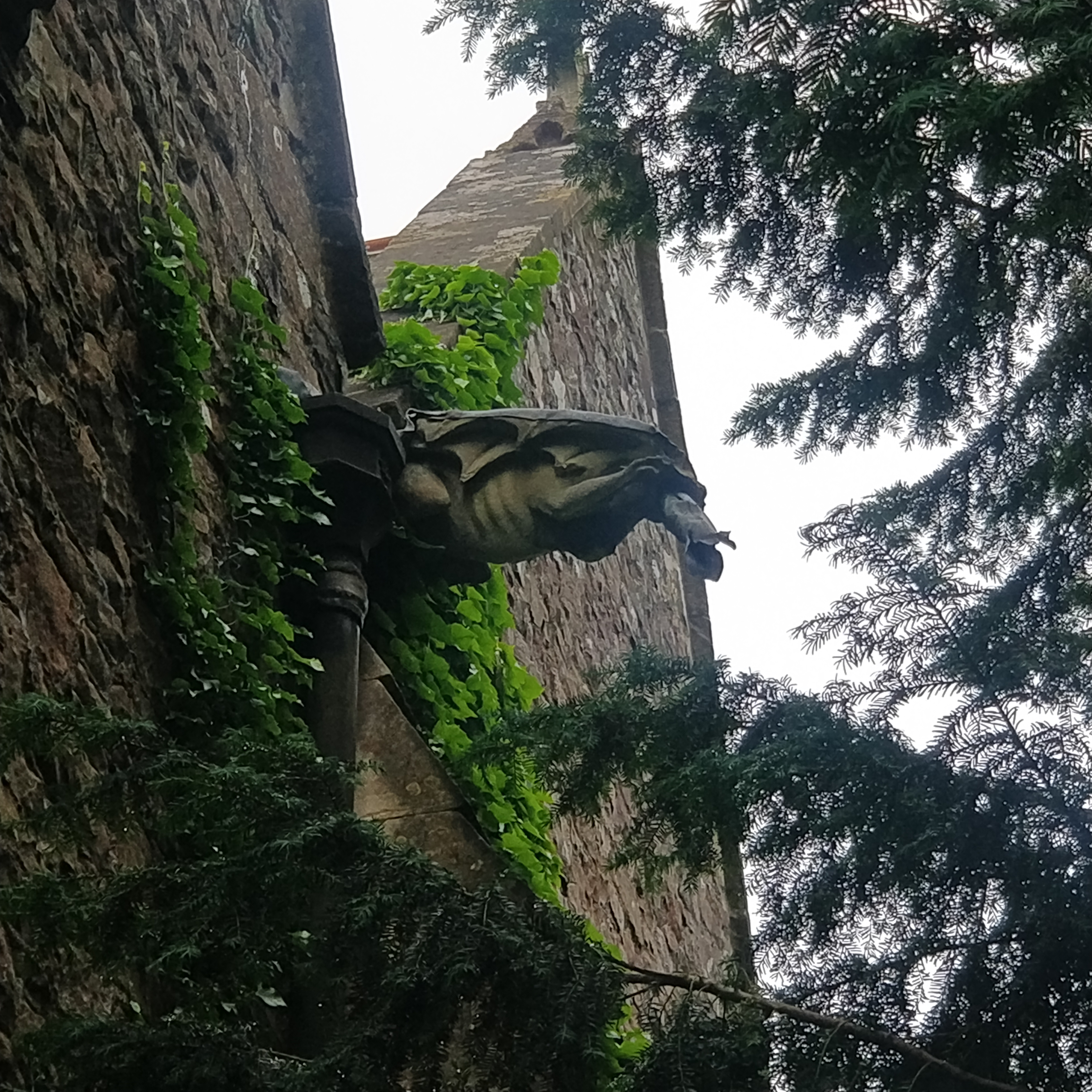
Gargoyle at St Andrew's Church

The gargoyled church of St Andrews is situated in Rectory Lane and was built over a monastery. There is an area named Abbotside close to the church. The Church of England village school is also called St Andrews and is situated next to the church. It is said that there is a tunnel which runs under the church yard, across the field and eventually comes out at Abbotside. The tunnel is believed to have been used in Tudor times during the reign of Henry VIII as a safe passage by monks from the abbey. At the other end of the village towards Yate, there is a small lane called Cowship Lane. In the village there is a post office, garage and a pub called The Royal Oak.

== Mining History ==
There were several coal mines in Cromhall which worked two seams of coal, the "Top" and "Bottom". The thickness varied "in places being thirty inches thick and in others six inches or dwindled away altogether". The Old Engine works operated from 1774 to 1795, was resumed in 1815 but soon failed before being reopened again in 1819. A new colliery, to the south of the earlier works, was started in about 1827 but that too had closed by 1854. The remains of the engine house at the New Engine Works and the top of the shaft, now completely filled in, are still visible.

== Notable people ==
The author and writer on natural history Anthony Collett was born here, where his father was the rector. He was the nature correspondent for The Times during the 1910s and 1920s.

== Notable Buildings ==
The Parish Church of St Andrew is a Grade I listed building and the Old Rectory is listed at Grade II.
