= Ayot Greenway =

Rail trail in Hertfordshire, England

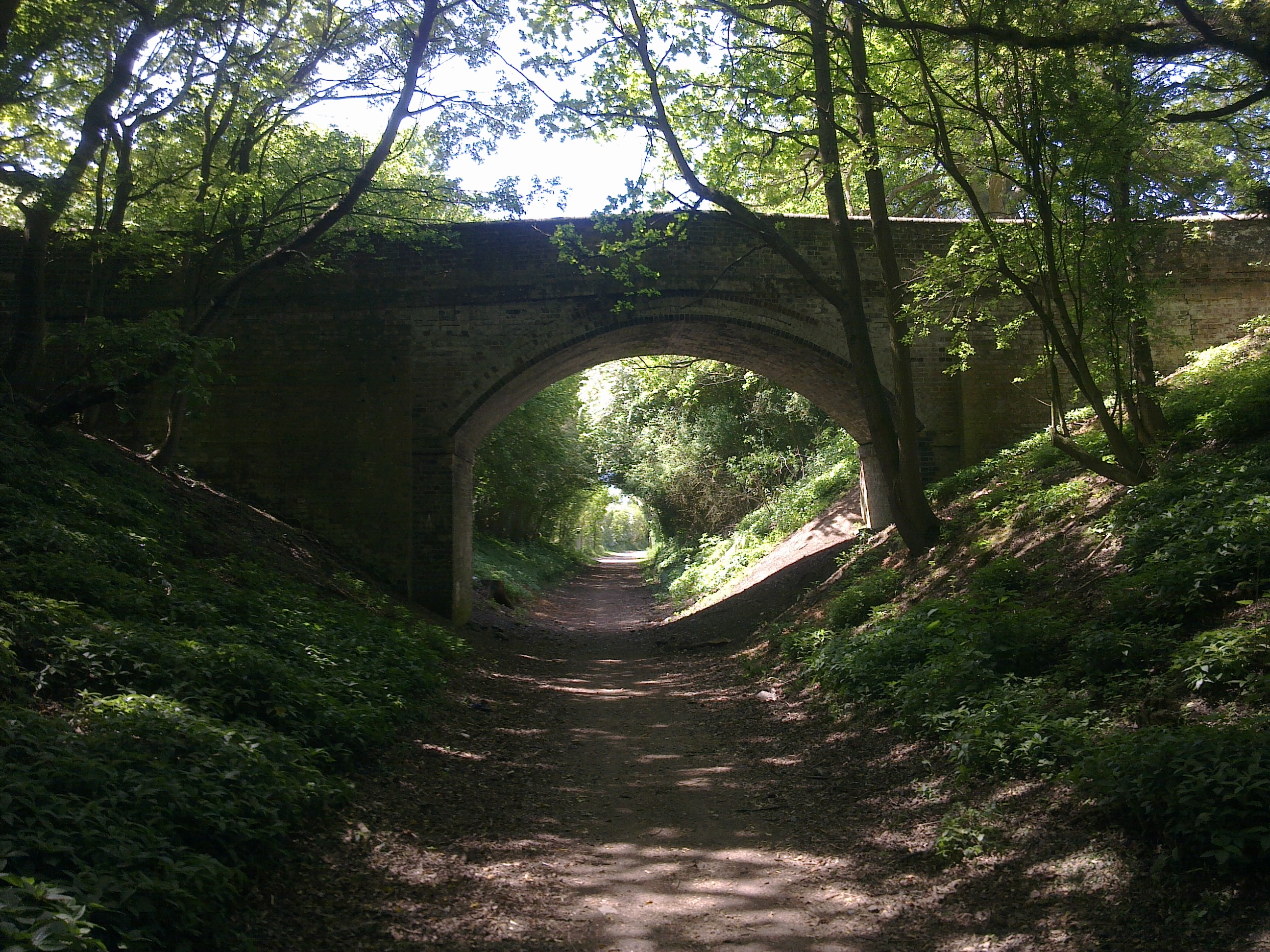
- Length: 5 mi (8.0 km)
- Location: Hertfordshire, England
- Trailheads: Welwyn Garden City – Wheathampstead
- Use: Hiking, Cycling, Horseriding

The Ayot Greenway is a rail trail which extends from Welwyn Garden City to Wheathampstead in Hertfordshire. Part of National Cycle Network Route 57, it runs for four miles (with a break where the A1(M) has been constructed) along a former branch line from Welwyn Garden City railway station towards Luton and Dunstable.

The line opened on 1 September 1860 and was operable for more than 100 years. Passenger numbers declined sharply after the Second World War and passenger services ended in 1951, although commercial traffic continued until 1966. Most of the track was lifted apart from a line into the Blackbridge landfill site from the Hatfield end, which continued until 1971 before the whole line was finally closed. Today, there are still visual reminders of the line, with two bridges still intact, the original fencing and even part of a collapsed railway signal.

The trail starts at the White Bridge in Welwyn Garden City, behind the library and Campus West. It continues through Sherrards Wood to the Red Lion pub on the Great North Road. Walkers and cyclists then use a road bridge over the A1(M) and pick up the trail again just north of Ayot St Peter at what was its railway station. This was destroyed by fire in 1948 and never rebuilt. The area where it once stood is now part of a car park.

Heading west along the trail is Hunter's Bridge, which crosses another public footpath, and then under another bridge (used for farm traffic) towards Robinson's Wood. Here, a small picnic area was built, and then the trail continues towards Wheathampstead. The original line is bisected by the B653 Wheathampstead bypass on the road to Luton, so the Ayot Greenway forks left through an underpass. From here the trail follows the River Lea into Wheathampstead.

The Ayot Greenway is one of three rail trails in the Welwyn Hatfield area. The other two include Alban Way from Hatfield to St Albans and Cole Green Way which connects Welwyn Garden City to Hertford.
