= Anthony Collett =

Anthony Keeling Collett (22 August 1877 – 22 August 1929) was an author and writer on natural history subjects and was nature correspondent for The Times during the 1910s and 1920s.

Collett's father was the Reverend William Collett, a former fellow of Oriel College, Oxford. He was born at Cromhall, Gloucestershire, where his father held the living that was dispensed by Oriel College, and was educated privately at Crowthorne and then at Bradfield College before being awarded a scholarship to study classics at Oriel. After graduating he was awarded a college scholarship that enabled him to spend some time at the University of Berlin.

Collett began work as a journalist for the St. James's Gazette in London, where he wrote on many subjects. From 1908, he also contributed to The Times, although not as a staff member until after World War I. He enlisted in the Post Office Rifles for that war, initially as a private and later as a commissioned officer. After fighting at Vimy Ridge, Collett, who was in any case generally not a particularly healthy man, was invalided home and served the rest of the war working in the War Office.

He was not enamoured of London and regularly lived and produced his writings from other places, including in the Italian Alps, Scotland and Wales. During the war, he had managed occasionally to write articles while in France. He died in a London nursing home on 22 August 1929, on his 52nd birthday, having suffered a significant decline in his already poor health in the previous two years. That decline may have been related to his war service.

Collett retained an affection for Bradfield College and was a governor there for many years.

W. H. Auden used many phrases from Collett's Changing Face of England in his poems.

The Chase, a 130-acre (0.53 km^{2}) woodland in Woolton Hill, was dedicated to the memory of Collett (according to a plaque on the site) when the land was presented to the National Trust for Places of Historic Interest or Natural Beauty in 1944 by Sir Kenneth Swan as a nature reserve and bird sanctuary.

== Bibliography ==
Among Collett's publications are:

- A Handbook of British Inland Birds (1906)
- The English Year (three volumes, co-authored with William Beach Thomas; T. C. & E. C. Jack, 1913–14)
- Birds Through The Year (co-authored with William Beach Thomas; T. C. & E. C. Jack, 1922)
- The Changing Year (undated)
- The Changing Face of England (1926)
- The Heart of a Bird (1927)

== See also ==
- William Beach Thomas
