= Wheathampstead =

Village in Hertfordshire, England

Coordinates: 51.812°N 0.293°W

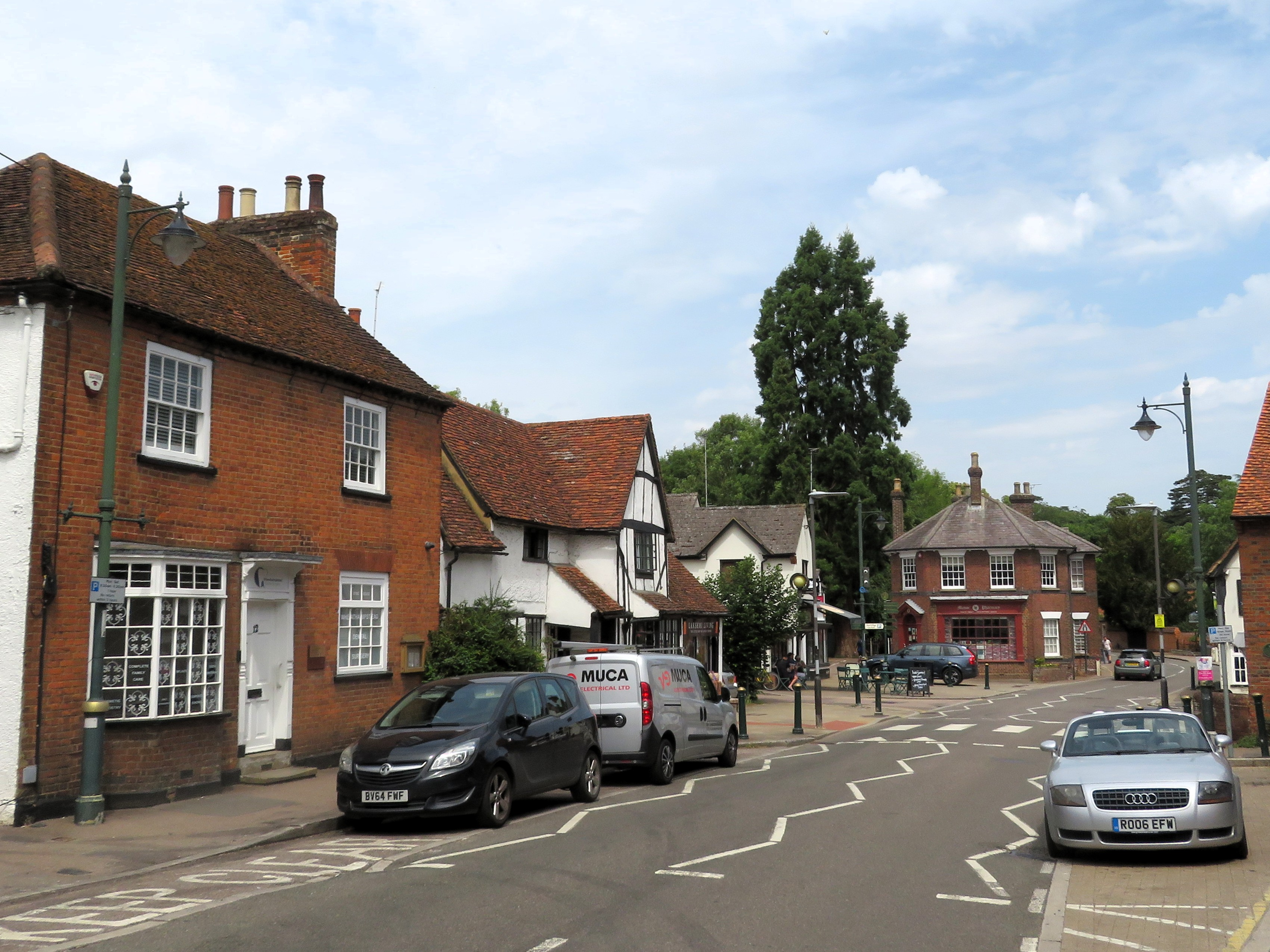
- High Street

- Location within Hertfordshire
- Area: 10.03 sq mi (26.0 km^{2})
- Population: 6,622 (Parish, 2021); 4,628 (Built up area, 2022)
  - Density: 660/sq mi (250/km^{2})
- OS grid reference: TL1714
- Civil parish: Wheathampstead
- District: St Albans
- Shire county: Hertfordshire
- Region: East
- Country: England
- Sovereign state: United Kingdom
- Post town: St Albans
- Postcode district: AL4
- Dialling code: 01582
- Police: Hertfordshire
- Fire: Hertfordshire
- Ambulance: East of England
- UK Parliament: Harpenden and Berkhamsted
- Website: Wheathampstead Parish Council

Wheathampstead is a large village and civil parish in Hertfordshire, England, north of St Albans. Included within the parish is the small hamlet of Amwell. The built up area of Wheathampstead had an estimated population of 4,628 in 2022, whilst the parish had a population of 6,622 at the 2021 census.

== History ==
Belgic invaders settled in this area around 50 BC. They moved up the rivers Thames and Lea from what is now Belgium. Evidence for them was found in Devil's Dyke, at the eastern side of Wheathampstead. The Devil's Dyke earthworks are part of the remains of an ancient settlement of the Catuvellauni and thought to have been the tribe's original capital. The capital was moved to Verlamion (which after the Roman conquest the Romans would rename Verulamium, which in turn would become modern St Albans) in about 20 BC. Silver Republican coins dating back to 100 BC are common finds around the Verulam settlement.

The Devil's Dyke is reputedly where Julius Caesar defeated Cassivellaunus in 54 BC, although this claim is disputed. Some historians suggest that the dyke was part of the same defensive rampart as nearby Beech Bottom Dyke, which, if correct, would make the area one of the largest and most important British Iron Age settlements.

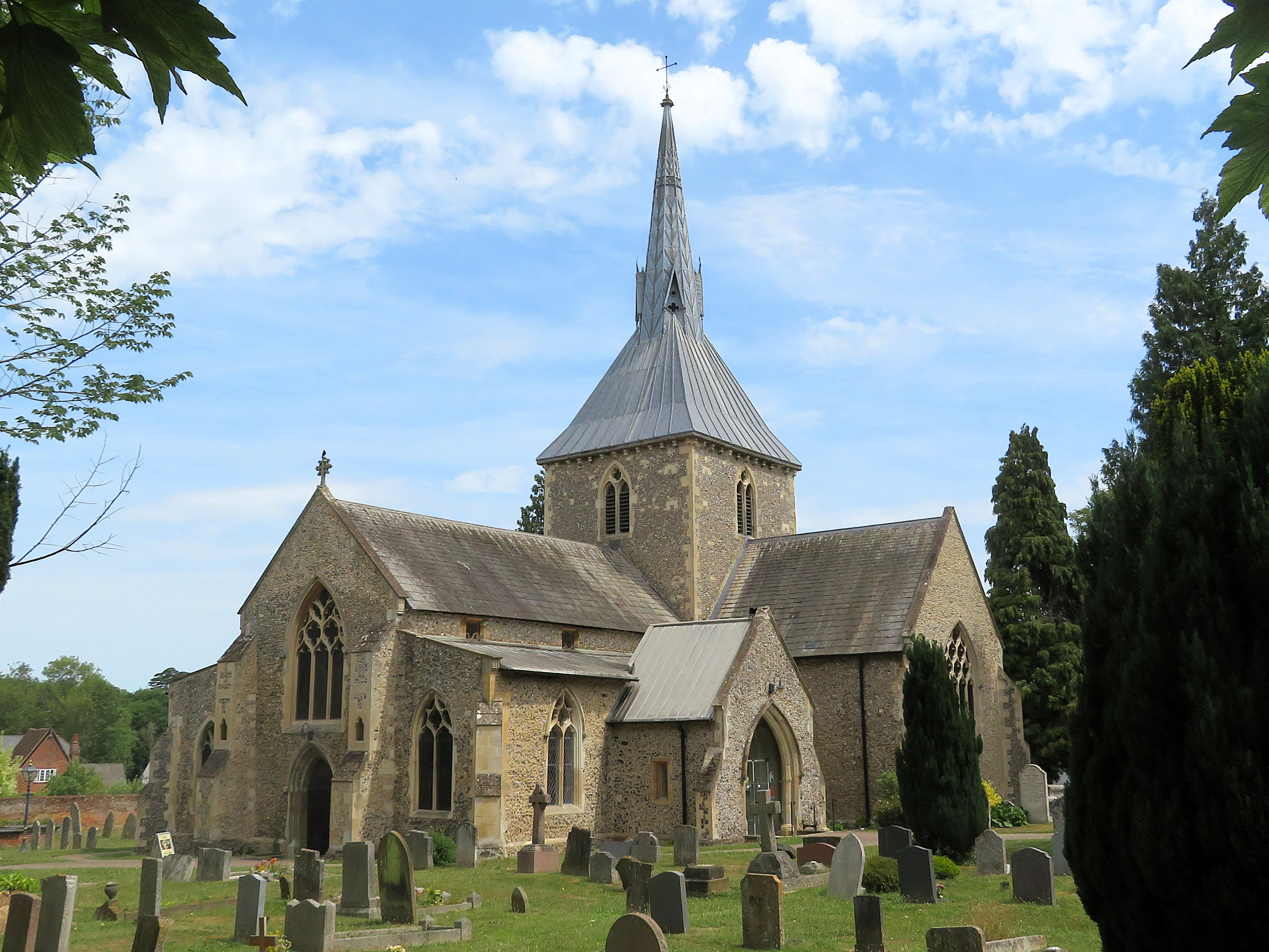
St Helen's Church

Later, the village is recorded in the Domesday Book of 1086 under the name Watamestede. It appears that a church existed at Wheathampstead before the Norman Conquest, as Wheathampstead was given by Edward the Confessor to Westminster Abbey, but it is very difficult to determine whether any portion of the present St Helen's Church is of Saxon work. The original structure was demolished in the reign of Henry III, the oldest portion of the present church, in the chancel, is assigned to the year 1280.

Some historians have claimed (Trokelowe, Annales (Rolls Ser.), 78.) that in 1312 the barons who leagued against Edward II and his favourite Piers Gaveston, gathered their troops at Wheathampstead, and whilst there refused to receive emissaries from the Pope, although there seems to be no other documentary evidence of this.

The parish of Wheathampstead included the chapelry of Harpenden until 1859. Several of the rectors of Wheathampstead (sometimes called Wheathampstead-cum-Harpenden) went on to have successful ecclesiastical careers. Richard Sampson, who held the position in the 16th century, was in 1523 appointed Lord President of Wales, and in 1543 consecrated Bishop of Coventry and Lichfield. Richard Pate, another rector, was in 1554 consecrated Bishop of Worcester. Lambert Osbaldeston was also master of Westminster School, and became more famous later for a controversy with Archbishop Laud; having used libellous language he was, in 1639, deprived of his living and fined £5,000. Henry Killigrew, in 1661, was made Master of the Savoy. John Lambe, whose father mainly devoted his life to the alleviation of the sufferings of prisoners, was also a rector, and was made Chaplain in Ordinary to William III and Mary II. John Wheeldon (1773–1800) was the author of several works, and Queen Victoria's private tutor was also a former rector.

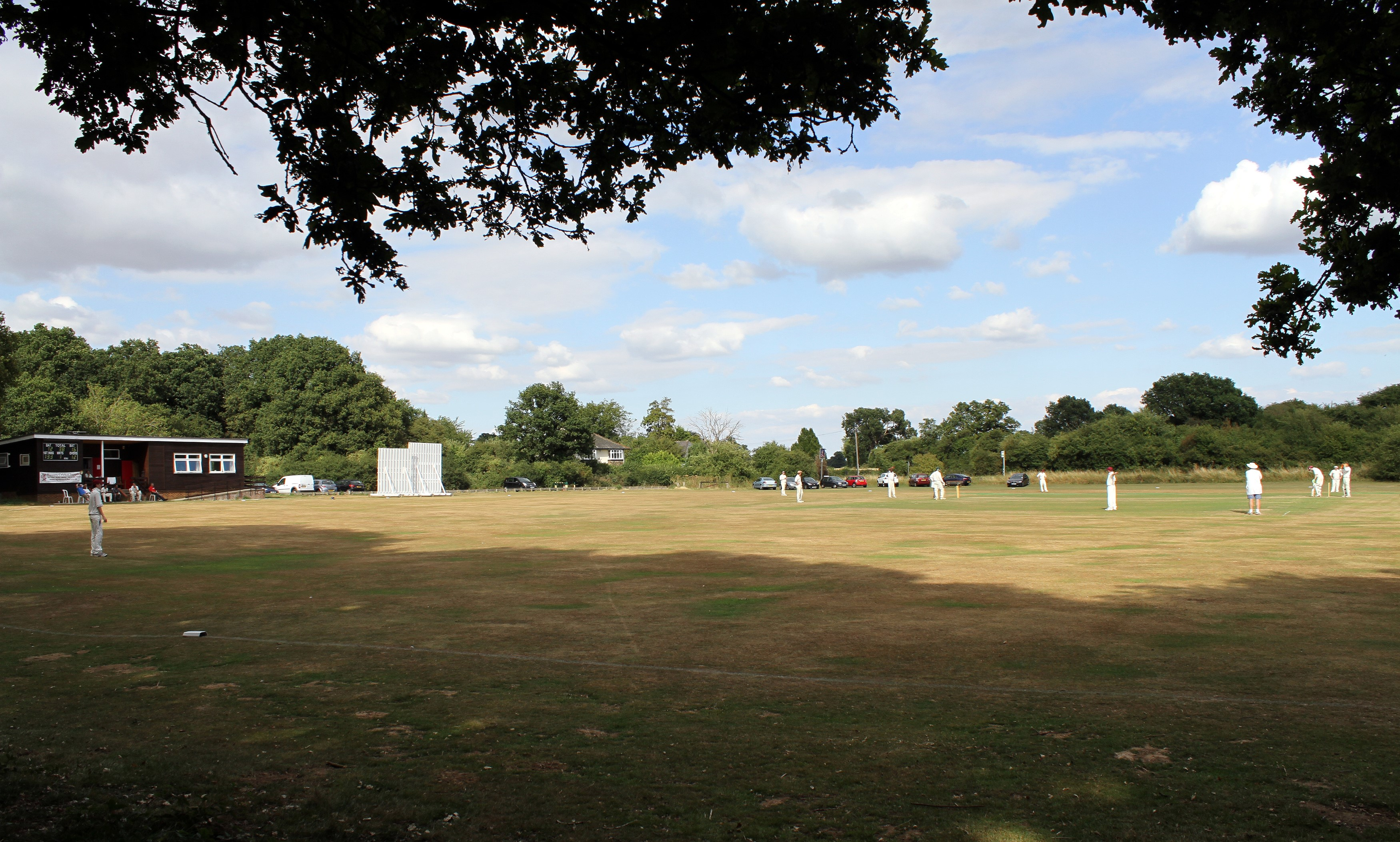
Cricket at Wheathampstead

The village is also close to Nomansland common, and slightly further afield, St Albans.

== Amwell ==
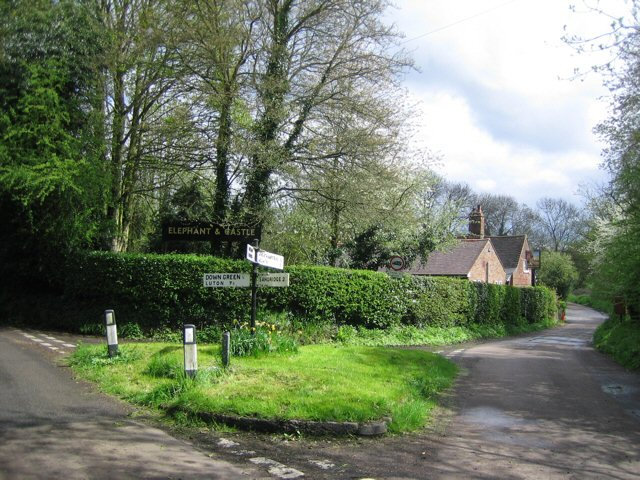
The crossroads at Amwell.

About 1 mile (1.6 km) to the southwest of Wheathamstead and lying within its civil and ecclesiastical parish, the hamlet of Amwell consists of a cluster of cottages and a public house at a crossroads. This small settlement has ancient origins and was first mentioned in 1272 as Hamewell in the records of Westminster Abbey.

The name is derived from the Old English language hamm, an enclosure, and weille, a spring. The hamlet has five Grade II listed buildings; four are cottages dating from the 18th century together with the Elephant and Castle pub, whose chimneys may date from the 16th century. The pub has an ancient well inside the building. A further three houses are locally listed. Amwell became a conservation area in October 1983.

== Transport ==
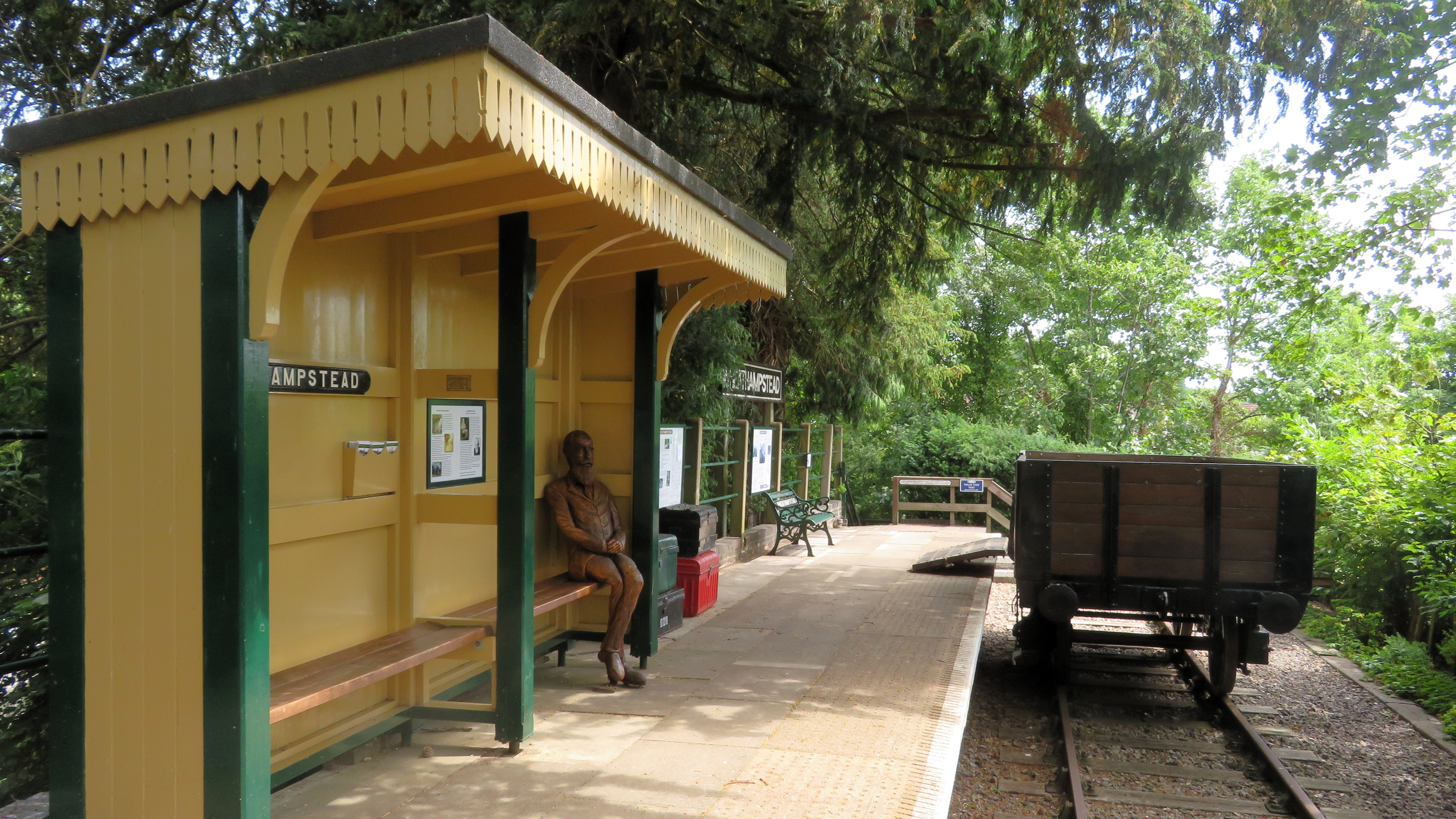
Partially restored platform at former Wheathampstead railway station, with statue of George Bernard Shaw and a short stretch of relaid track and a truck

Wheathampstead railway station was opened in 1860 on the Hertford, Luton and Dunstable Railway, a branch line linking Dunstable and Luton to the Great Northern Railway's main line at Hatfield. The branch line was bought by the Great Northern Railway the year after it opened. The station closed in 1965. An amateur film of the line's last day of operation can be seen on YouTube under the title "Welwyn Garden City, Harpenden East, Luton Hoo, Bute, Dunstable".

Public transport is now provided by an hourly bus between Borehamwood and Harpenden, operated by Aylesbury-based bus company Red Rose Travel. A half-hourly bus operated by Uno also runs through Wheathampstead between Luton and Hatfield.

== Notable residents ==
- Rudolph Lambart, 10th Earl of Cavan (1865–1946), field marshal and Chief of Imperial General Staff
- Apsley Cherry-Garrard (1886–1959), polar explorer
- Reginald Owen (1887–1972), character actor
- William Beach Thomas (1868–1957), author, journalist, war correspondent and writer about country life, lived here in later life and is buried here.
- Archie Camden (1888–1979), bassoonist, died here at the age of 90.
- Michael Ventris (1922–1956), linguist who deciphered Linear B
- Nick Halling, TV presenter and sports journalist
- Nick Payne, playwright
- Diane Munday, abortion activist

== Images ==
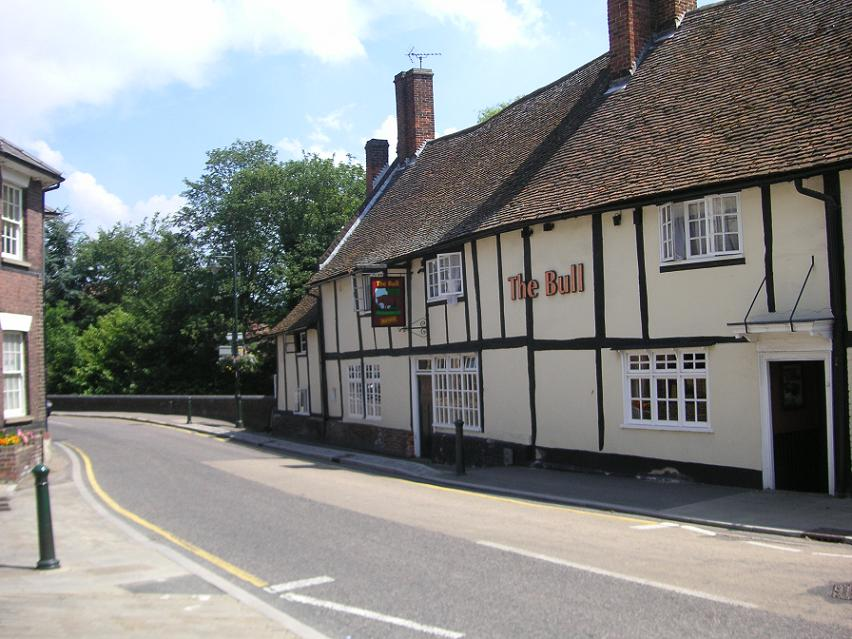
The Mill Bridge and the Bull public house

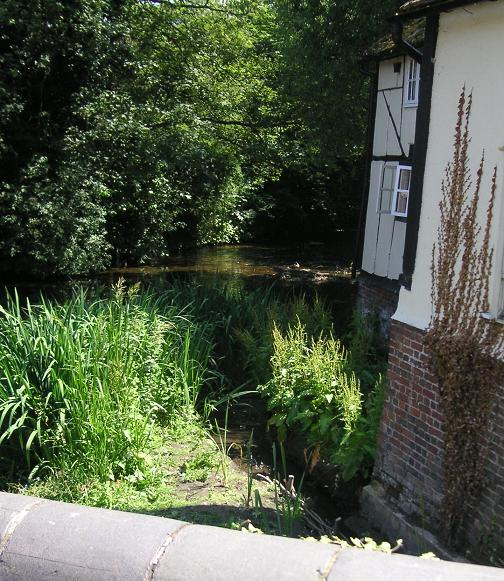
River Lea flowing through Wheathampstead
