= Ayot St Peter =

Village in Hertfordshire, England

Coordinates: 51°49′15″N 0°14′00″W

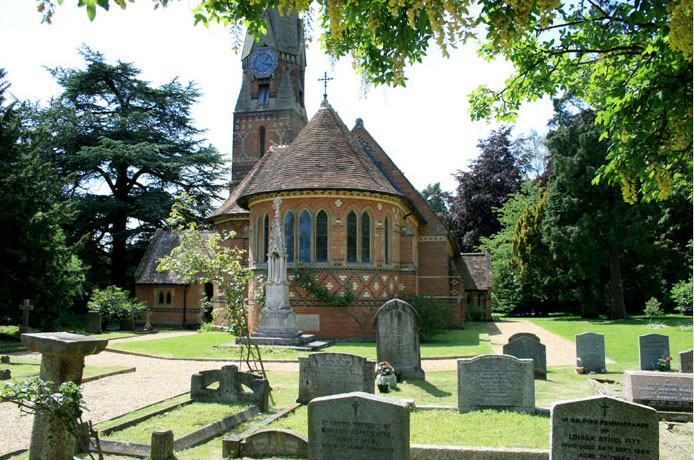
- St. Peter's Church at Ayot St. Peter

- Location within Hertfordshire
- Population: 245 (2011 Census)
- Civil parish: Ayot St Peter
- District: Welwyn Hatfield
- Shire county: Hertfordshire
- Region: East
- Country: England
- Sovereign state: United Kingdom
- Post town: Welwyn
- Postcode district: AL6
- Police: Hertfordshire
- Fire: Hertfordshire
- Ambulance: East of England
- UK Parliament: Welwyn Hatfield

Ayot St Peter is a village and civil parish in the Welwyn Hatfield district of Hertfordshire, England, about two miles north-west of Welwyn Garden City. According to the 2001 census it had a population of 166. At the 2011 Census the population including the nearby Ayot Green and Ayot St Lawrence was 245.
