= Harpenden Town Hall =

Municipal building in Harpenden, Hertfordshire, England

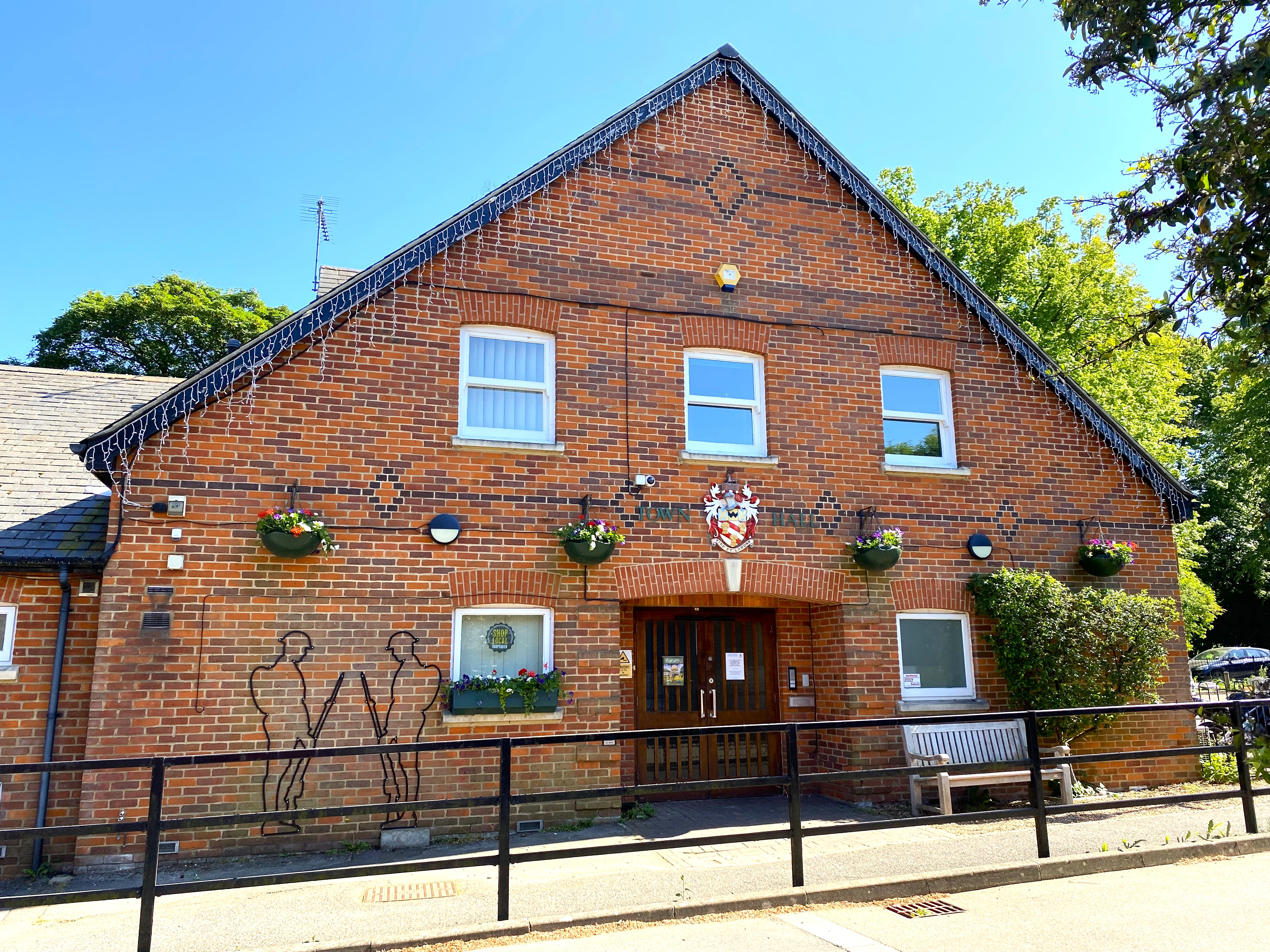
- The building in 2023

- Shown in Hertfordshire
- 51.8131°N 0.3555°W
- Location: Leyton Road, Harpenden

History
- Built: 1994

Site notes
- Architectural style: English vernacular style

Harpenden Town Hall is a municipal building in Leyton Road in Harpenden, a town in Hertfordshire, in England. It accommodates the offices and meeting place of Harpenden Town Council.

== History ==
=== Park Hall ===
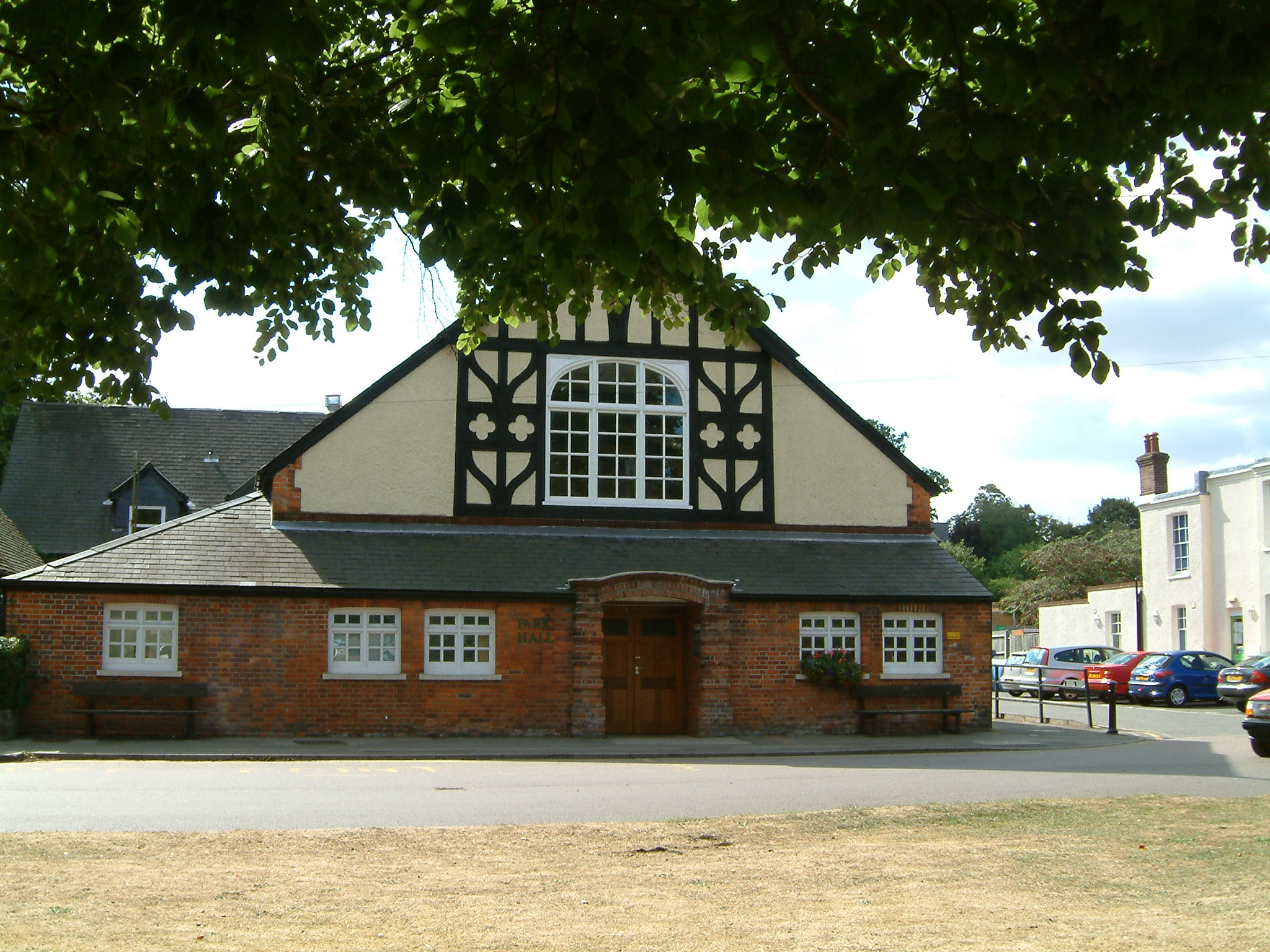
Park Hall

The oldest part of the complex is Park Hall which was commissioned by the British and Foreign School Society as the Harpenden British School. The site was donated by the entrepreneur and agricultural scientist, Sir John Lawes, who lived at Rothamsted Manor.

The building was designed in the English vernacular style, built in red brick and was completed in 1850. The design involved an asymmetrical main frontage of six bays facing onto Leyton Road. The ground floor was projected forward as a lean-to with a recessed doorway, flanked by banded pilasters supporting a segmental-headed arch, in the fourth bay. The other bays were fenestrated by casement windows. On the first floor, there was a wide gable containing a segmental-headed window flanked by decorative half-timbered quatrefoils and other carvings with a stucco infill.

Following the implementation of the Elementary Education Act 1870, the school became a Board School and, in 1897, the school relocated to a more substantial building in Victoria Road. After moving again, to Manland Common, it evolved to become the Sir John Lawes School. Following significant population growth, largely associated with the straw plaiting and brewing industries, an urban district council was formed in the area in 1898. The old school in Leyton Road was acquired by the new council later in 1898 and re-opened as the "Public Hall" in September 1899, acting as the council's meeting place and offices as well as a public events venue.

The building remained the local seat of government until the council relocated to Harpenden Hall in Southdown Road in 1931. The building on Leyton Road, which became known as "Park Hall", continued to be used as a community events venue and served as the local Air Raid Precautions headquarters during the Second World War.

Following local government re-organisation in 1974, the enlarged St Albans District Council took ownership of Park Hall. The building subsequently became dilapidated and, in the 1980s, it was proposed that the building be demolished: however the district council placed an conservation order on the building and agreed to lease it to Harpenden Town Council.

=== The town hall ===
In the early 1990s, the town council decided to refurbish Park Hall and to commission a new building at the rear of the original building to function as a town hall. The new building, which faced onto the side road to the northwest of Park Hall, was designed in a similar style as the original building and built in red brick. The whole complex was officially re-opened by the Secretary of State for Social Security, Peter Lilley, on 8 October 1994. The town council relocated from Harpenden Hall to the new town hall in August 1996.

Works of art in the town hall include a painting by Frank O. Salisbury entitled "Lady in Red". The painting was intended to depict the actress in the role of Katherina in William Shakespeare's play, The Taming of the Shrew.
