= Rothamsted =

Rothamsted may refer to:

- Rothamsted Manor, a former manor near Harpenden in English county of Hertfordshire.
- Rothamsted Park, a public park in Harpenden in English county of Hertfordshire.
- Rothamsted Research, an English agricultural research institution, formerly known as Rothamsted Experimental Station.
