= Elliott Obatoyinbo =

England rugby union player

- Born: 9 October 1998 (age 28)
- Height: 1.79 m (5 ft 10 in)
- Weight: 93 kg (205 lb; 14 st 9 lb)
- School: Stonyhurst College; Harrow School

Rugby union career
- Position(s): Full back, Wing
- Current team: Newcastle Falcons
Senior career
Years	Team	Apps	(Points)
2018–2022	Saracens	29	(15)
2018–2019	→Ampthill		
2018–2019	→London Scottish		
2022–	Newcastle Falcons	49	(15)
- Correct as of 8 August 2025
International career
Years	Team	Apps	(Points)
- England U18
–	England U20		
- Correct as of 24 March 2023

Elliott Obatoyinbo (born 9 October 1998) is an English professional rugby union player, who currently plays as a back for Premiership Rugby side Newcastle Falcons.

== Early life ==
Obatoyinbo was born to an English mother and a Nigerian father, Iby, a founding member of the invitational rugby sevens team Racing Club Academy. He has a younger brother named Harrison, who plays rugby for Top 14 club Toulon in France.

As a child, Obatoyinbo attended Stonyhurst College in Lancashire, before switching to Harrow School. While at Harrow, he played rugby under the tutelage of the former Northampton Saints and London Irish centre and retired Scotland international, Joe Ansbro, who is also of African descent. His teammates at the school included fellow future Saracens academy graduates Andy Christie, Sean Reffell and Manu Vunipola.

Obatoyinbo has represented England at age-grade level, playing for the U18 and U20 teams.

== Rugby career ==
Obatoyinbo was recruited into the Saracens youth system in 2016. As part of his early rugby development, he spent the summer of 2018 in New Zealand, playing with the academy of National Provincial Championship side Wellington Lions.

Shortly after his 20th birthday, Obatoyinbo made his first-team debut for Saracens on 27 October 2018, in a Premiership Rugby Cup match against Leicester Tigers. During that season, he also spent time out on loan, helping Ampthill RUFC to achieve promotion from National League 1, and featuring for London Scottish in the RFU Championship. In addition, he was part of the Saracens Storm team that won the Premiership Rugby Shield in 2019. The following year, Obatoyinbo signed a new contract with Saracens and graduated into the club's senior squad.

On the 12 September 2022 he signed a short-term with Newcastle Falcons.

== Personal life ==
Obatoyinbo is an avid scratch golfer and is a member at Harpenden Common Golf Club. He previously competed at the Junior Open Championship, and said he had considered pursuing a professional golf career, before going full-time with rugby.

Obatoyinbo is also a keen artist, with his works based on African art. His inspirations include British-born painter Chris Ofili and Nigerian creator Bruce Onobrakpeya.
