= Richard Lydekker =

British naturalist and geologist (1849–1915)

Richard Lydekker FRS
- Lydekker, c. 1900
- Born: 25 July 1849; London, England
- Died: 16 April 1915 (aged 65); Harpenden, England
- Education: Trinity College, Cambridge
- Awards: Lyell Medal (1902)
- Scientific career
- Fields: Geology; Biogeography
- Workplaces: Natural History Museum
- Author abbrev. (zoology): Lydekker

Richard Lydekker (/lɪˈdɛkər/; 25 July 1849 – 16 April 1915) was a British naturalist, geologist and writer of numerous books on natural history. He was known for his contributions to zoology, paleontology, and biogeography. He worked extensively in cataloging fossil vertebrates and describing new species, particularly from India, where he spent several years studying the region's prehistoric fauna.

Lydekker was a key figure in the field of vertebrate paleontology, authoring numerous scientific papers and books that helped classify extinct and extant species.

== Biography ==
Richard Lydekker was born at Tavistock Square in London. His father was Gerard Wolfe Lydekker, a barrister-at-law with Dutch ancestry. The family moved to Harpenden Lodge soon after Richard's birth. He was educated at Trinity College, Cambridge, where he took a first-class in the Natural Science tripos (1872). In 1874 he joined the Geological Survey of India and made studies of the vertebrate palaeontology of northern India (especially Kashmir). He remained in this post until the death of his father in 1881. His main work in India was on the Siwalik palaeofauna; it was published in Palaeontologia Indica. He was responsible for the cataloguing of the fossil mammals, reptiles, and birds in the Natural History Museum (10 vols., 1891), where he worked in an honorary capacity for the rest of his life.

He named a variety of taxa, including the golden-bellied mangabey; as a taxon authority, he is named simply as "Lydekker".

== Biogeography ==
Map of Sunda and Sahul, showing Lydekker's Line, which on this map mistakenly runs east of the Aru Islands.

He was influential in the science of biogeography. In 1896, he delineated the biogeographical boundary through Indonesia, known as Lydekker's Line, that separates Wallacea on the west from Australia-New Guinea on the east. It follows the edge of the Sahul Shelf, an area from New Guinea to Australia of shallow water with the Aru Islands on its edge. Along with Wallace's Line and others, it indicates the definite effect of geology on the biogeography of the region, something not seen so clearly in other parts of the world.

== First cuckoo ==
Lydekker attracted amused public attention with a pair of letters to The Times in 1913, when he wrote on 6 February that he had heard a cuckoo, contrary to Yarrell's History of British Birds which doubted the bird arrived before April. Six days later, on 12 February 1913, he wrote again, confessing that "the note was uttered by a bricklayer's labourer". Letters about the first cuckoo became a tradition in the newspaper.

== Awards ==
He was elected a Fellow of the Royal Society in 1894, and received the Lyell Medal from the Geological Society of London in 1902.

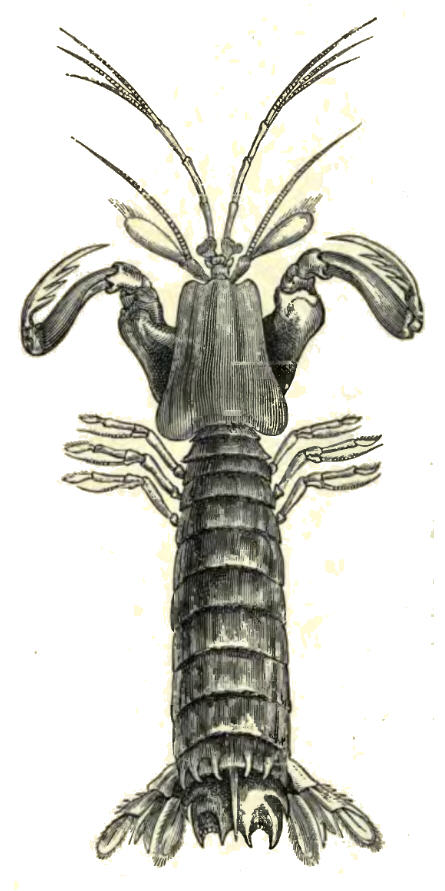
Drawing of a mantis shrimp by Richard Lydekker, 1896

== Works ==
- Catalogue of the Fossil Mammalia in the British Museum (Natural History), 5 vols. (1885–1887)
- Catalogue of the Fossil Reptilia and Amphibia in the British Museum (Natural History), 4 vols. (1889)
- A Manual of Palaeontology (with Henry Alleyne Nicholson, 2 vols., 1889)
- Catalogue of the Fossil Birds in the British Museum (Natural History) (1891)
- Phases of Animal Life (1892)
- The Royal Natural History (with W. H. Flower), 6 vols., 12 sec. (1893–1896)
- A Hand-book to the Marsupialia and Monotremata (1894)
- Life and Rock: A Collection of Zoological and Geological Essays (1894)
- A Geographical History of Mammals (1896)
- A Hand-book to the British Mammalia (1896)
- A Handbook to the Carnivora: part 1: cats, civets, and mongooses (1896)
- The Deer of all Lands: A history of the family Cervidae, living and extinct (1898)
- Wild Oxen, Sheep & Goats of all Lands, Living and Extinct (1898)
- The Wild Animals of India, Burma, Malaya, and Tibet (1900)
- The great and small game of Europe, western & northern Asia and America (1901)
- The New Natural History 6 vols. (1901)
- Living Races of Mankind: A popular illustrated account of the customs, habits, pursuits, feasts, and ceremonies of the races of mankind throughout the world, 2 vols. (1902), with Henry Neville Hutchinson and John Walter Gregory
- Mostly Mammals: Zoological Essays (1903)
- Guide to the Gallery of Reptilia and Amphibia in the British Museum (1906)
- Sir William Flower (1906)
- The Game Animals of India, Burma, Malaya, and Tibet (rev. ed.) (1907)
- Guide to the Great Game Animals (Ungulata) in British Museum (1907)
- Guide to the Specimens of the Horse Family (Equidæ) in British Museum (1907)
- The Game Animals of Africa (1908)
- A Guide to the Domesticated Animals (other than horses) (1908)
- Guide to the Whales, Porpoises, and Dolphins (order Cetacea) (1909)
- A number of articles in the Encyclopædia Britannica, 1911
- Animal Portraiture (1912)
- The Horse and its Relatives (1912)
- The Sheep and its Cousins (1912)
- Catalogue of the heads and horns of Indian big game bequeathed by A. O. Hume ... to the British Museum (Natural History) (1913)
- Catalogue of the ungulate mammals in the British Museum (Natural History) 5 vols. (1913–1916)
- Wild Life of the World: a descriptive survey of the geographical distribution of animals 3 vols. (1916)

== See also ==
- Australia (continent)
- Wallace Line
- Wallacea
- Weber Line
