= Kinsbourne Green =

Hamlet in Hertfordshire, England

Coordinates: 51.83°N 0.39°W

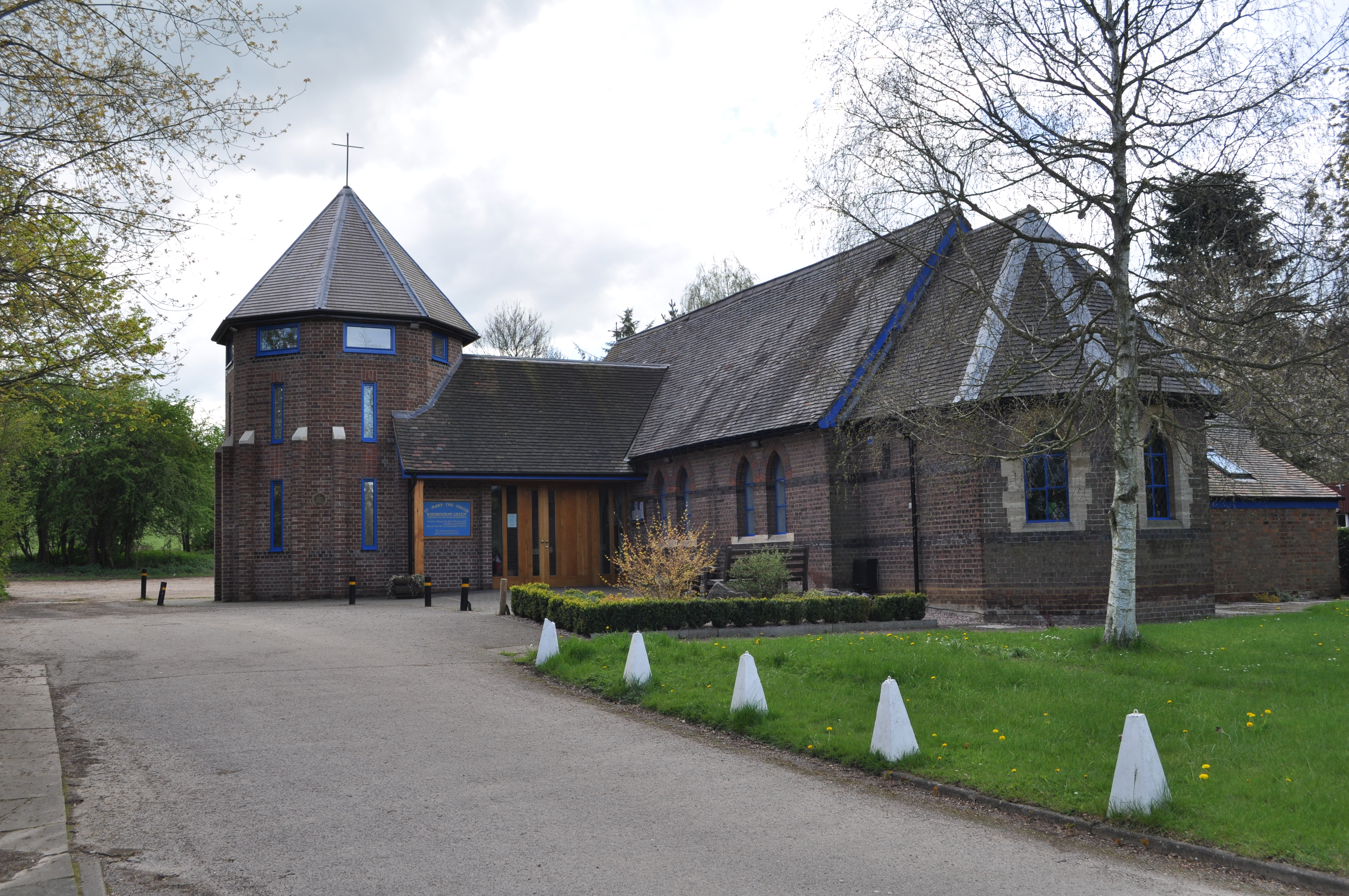
- St Mary the Virgin Church, Kinsbourne Green

- Location within Hertfordshire
- District: St Albans
- Shire county: Hertfordshire
- Region: East
- Country: England
- Sovereign state: United Kingdom
- Post town: HARPENDEN
- Postcode district: AL5
- Dialling code: 01582
- Police: Hertfordshire
- Fire: Hertfordshire
- Ambulance: East of England
- UK Parliament: Harpenden and Berkhamsted

Kinsbourne Green is a small hamlet to the north-west of Harpenden in Hertfordshire, England.

== Geography ==
The hamlet is now geographically virtually contiguous with Harpenden. Kinsbourne Green is in the civil parish of Harpenden Rural (where at the 2011 Census the population was included).

== Notable residents ==
- Richard Clarkson (1904-96), chief aerodynamicist of de Havilland from 1935 to 1958, and hence was responsible for the de Havilland Mosquito, who lived in the village in the 1950s
