= Harpenden Rural =

Civil parish in Hertfordshire, England

Coordinates: 51.825°N 0.394°W

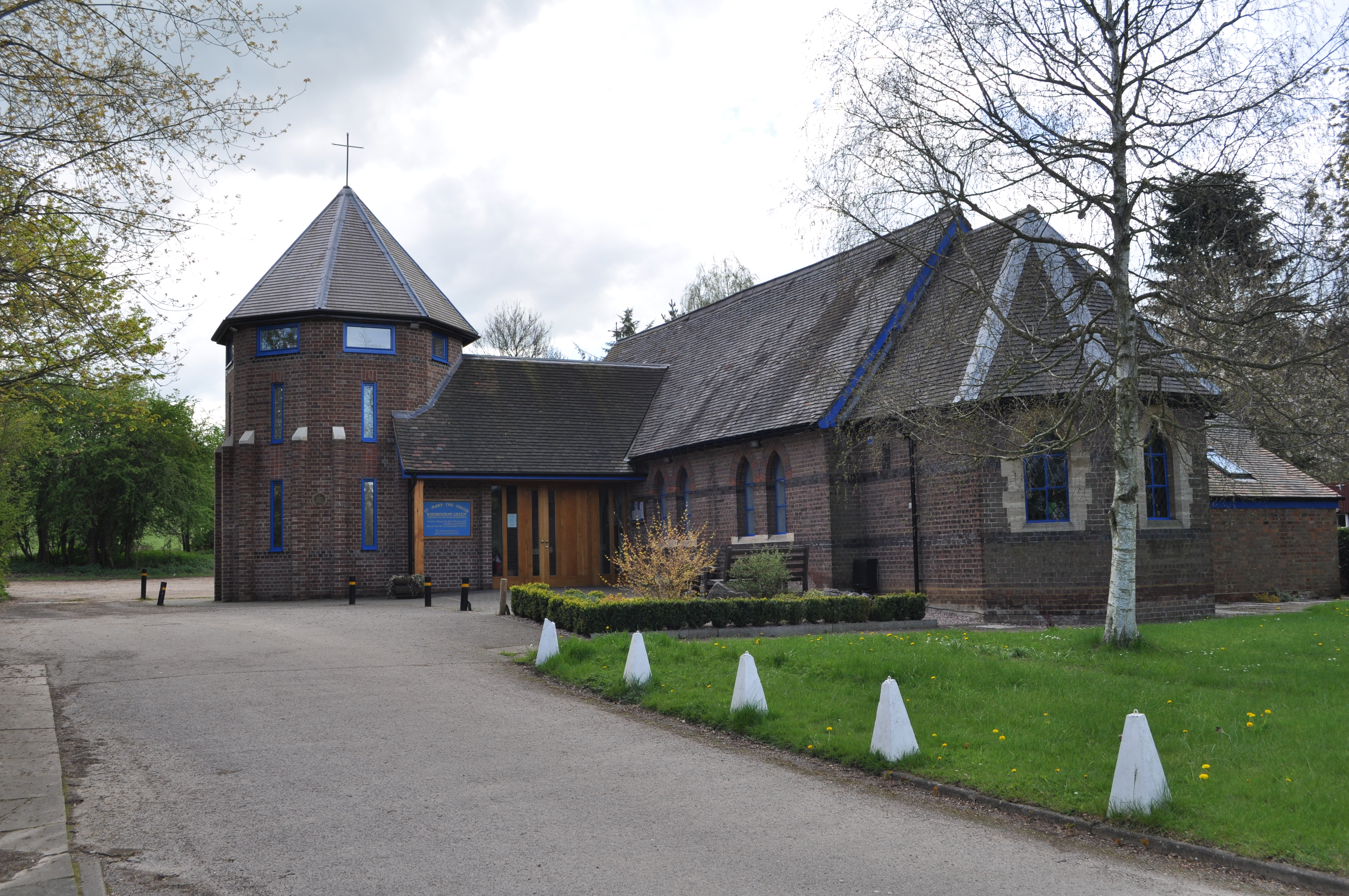
- Kinsbourne Green church

- Location within Hertfordshire
- Area: 3.56 sq mi (9.2 km^{2})
- Population: 405
  - Density: 114/sq mi (44/km^{2})
- Civil parish: Harpenden Rural
- District: St Albans
- Shire county: Hertfordshire
- Region: East
- Country: England
- Sovereign state: United Kingdom
- Post town: Harpenden
- Postcode district: AL5
- Police: Hertfordshire
- Fire: Hertfordshire
- Ambulance: East of England
- Website: Harpenden Rural Parish Council

Harpenden Rural is a civil parish in the City and District of St Albans in Hertfordshire, England, to the west of Harpenden parish. In 2021 the parish had a population of 454.

The local council is Harpenden Rural Parish Council.

It was created on 15 April 1898 when the former Harpenden parish was split into two parts: Harpenden Urban parish covering the Harpenden Urban District (which was created on the same day), and Harpenden Rural parish which remained in the St Albans Rural District.

The parish includes Kinsbourne Green, and Rothamsted Manor, including the Rothamsted Experimental Station.
