= Aldwickbury School =

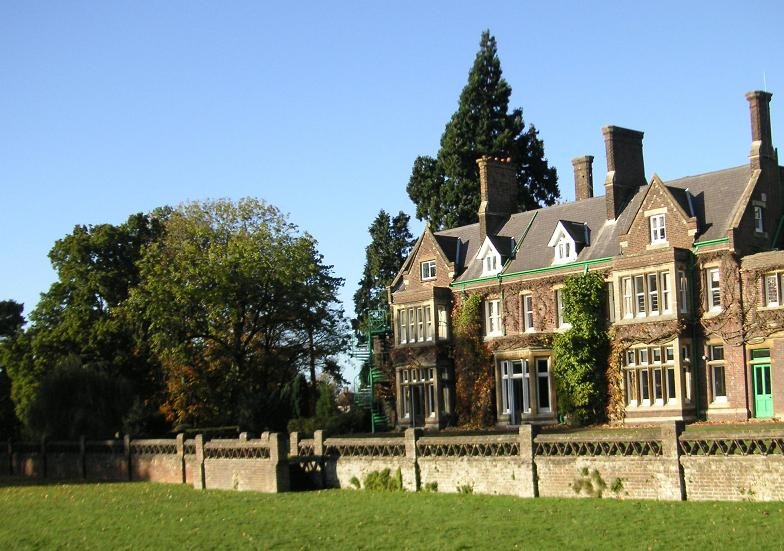
- School badge Aldwickbury School building

Location
- Wheathampstead Road; Harpenden, Hertfordshire, AL5 1AD; England; 51.81143°N 0.33063°W

Information
- Type: 3-13 Preparatory School
- Religious affiliation: Church of England
- Established: 1948
- Founder: Kenneth Castle
- Local authority: Hertfordshire
- Department for Education URN: 117608 Tables
- Headmaster: Paul Symes
- Gender: Mixed
- Age: 3 to 13
- Enrolment: 364 (2022)
- Houses: Lowlands, Highlands, Uplands, Midlands.
- Colours: Purple, Gold
- Publication: “Aldwickbury Magazine”
- Website: www.aldwickbury.org.uk

Aldwickbury School is a 3-13 co-educational private preparatory school located on the outskirts of Harpenden, Hertfordshire in the United Kingdom. Aldwickbury School was established in 1937, when Kenneth Castle took over as headmaster of Lea House School in Harpenden. At that time, the school consisted of 15 boys.

In 2022, a total of 364 boys were enrolled at Aldwickbury School.

== History ==
The school dates its history from 1937 when Kenneth Castle took over as headmaster of Lea House School in Harpenden. At that time, the school consisted of 15 boys, along-with a small number of girls also attending the school. Castle was later elected to the Incorporated Association of Preparatory Schools as the Head of Lea House in 1943. Aldwickbury Mansion, along with its 14-acre site was purchased following consideration by Castle to use it as a day and boarding school. Brian Chidell became the headmaster and proprietor after Castle's death in 1960. In 1969, Aldwickbury School Trust Ltd was set up, with a board of governors to oversee the schools operations.

In 1967, an existing nursery school provision was invited to join the school and was incorporated with the school under the Aldwickbury School name later in 1967. During 1969―1979, works were undertaken across the school site, including the construction of new buildings, together with the refurbishment of existing facilities. In 1979, Brian Chidell stepped down from the role of headmaster, with Peter Jeffery becoming the new headmaster in 1979, a position he held until 2003. Vernon Hales was subsequently appointed as headmaster of Aldwickbury School, and Paul Symes took up the post in September 2021.

== Notable alumni ==
- Tim Rice, lyricist, attended 1950–
