= The King's School (Harpenden) =

Location
- Elmfield, Ambrose Ln, Harpenden, Hertfordshire, AL5 4DU; England; 51.829534°N 0.364008°W

Information
- Type: Private
- Religious affiliation: Christian
- Established: 1982
- Department for Education URN: 117650 Tables
- Headmaster: Andy Reeves
- Gender: Coeducation
- Age: 4 to 16
- Enrolment: 172
- Website: https://www.thekingsschool.com/

The King's School, Harpenden is a co-educational independent school for pupils aged four to sixteen, located to the north of Harpenden in Hertfordshire, England. The independent Christian day school's mission statement is 'Young people devoted to Christ, equipped for life and prepared to reach the world', although it is not affiliated to one particular church or denomination.

The school's intake is mostly from the counties Hertfordshire and Bedfordshire. The charity, Kingdom Education Limited operates The King's School, Harpenden and Highfield Preschool. It is affiliated to the Christian Schools Trust.

The King's School joined the Independent Schools Association in October 2017 and was inspected in September 2024 by the Independent Schools Inspectorate.

== History ==
The school was first established in Hemel Hempstead in 1982 by Stephen Dennett before moving to Harpenden in 1987 onto the site of the former Elmfield Sanatorium, which originally opened in 1910.
