= Henry Neville Hutchinson =

Henry Neville Hutchinson FGS, FRGS, FZS (1856 in Chester – 1927) was an Anglican clergyman and, during the 1890s, a leading writer of popular books on geology, palaeontology, evolution and anthropology.

Henry Neville Hutchinson was the eldest son of Thomas Neville Hutchinson, an Anglican clergyman and amateur naturalist. H. N. Hutchinson was educated at Rugby School and St John's College, Cambridge, where he earned a bachelor's degree in 1878. In 1879–1880 he was a student-master at Clifton College. In 1884 he was curate to St Saviour's, Redland Park, Bristol. In 1886–1887 he was private tutor to the sons of the Earl of Morley. In 1891 he began literary work in London. He was an amateur naturalist and photographer, whose collection of photographs was exhibited at The Anthropological Institute of Great Britain and Ireland where he encouraged members to collect quality photographs for ethnological purposes.

He married at Olton parish church on 22 January 1903 to Bertha Hasluck, daughter of Sydney Hasluck, of Olton Court.

== Works ==
- Autobiography of the Earth (1890)
- The Story of the Hills (1891)
- Extinct Monsters (1892)
- Creatures of Other Days (1894)
- Prehistoric Man and Beast (1896)
- Descriptive Lecture on Pre-historic Man in Britain and Europe (1896)
- Marriage Customs in Many Lands (1897)
- Primæval Scenes (1899)
- The living races of mankind: a popular illustrated account of the customs, habits, pursuits, feasts and ceremonies of the races of mankind throughout the world (1900) (with John Walter Gregory and Richard Lydekker)
- The Living Races of Mankind By Richard Lydekker, Henry Neville Hutchinson, John Walter Gregory (1985) Mittal Publications Volume 2
- The Living Rulers of Mankind (1901)
