= Rothamsted Park =

Public park in Harpenden, Hertfordshire, England

Coordinates: 51°48′43″N 0°21′38″W

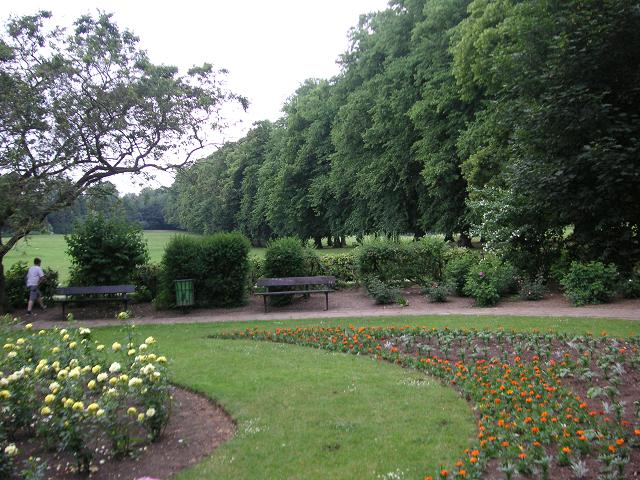
The avenue of lime trees (right)

Rothamsted Park is a 56-acre (230,000 m^{2}) public park in Harpenden, Hertfordshire.

== History ==
The Park was formerly part of the Manor of Rothamsted, later Rothamsted estate, owned by Sir John Lawes. He initiated agricultural experiments in 1843, which led to the founding of the nearby Rothamsted Experimental Station. He also created the formal entrance from Leyton Road to what is now the Park and planted the avenue of Lime trees. In 1931, the family decided to sell the estate, and after a successful public appeal, the Experimental Station was able to finance its purchase of the estate in 1934. In 1938 the Harpenden Urban District Council purchased the land now known as Rothamsted park from the Experimental Station, in order to provide playing fields and to preserve an important open space. Rothamsted Park is also home to Harpenden Town FC.

The Park's main entrance gates were removed for salvage during World War II, and after the war the restoration of the entrance was paid for by the Friends Provident Insurance Company.

== Facilities ==
The Park covers 23 hectares and is home to Harpenden's leisure centre, swimming pool and theatre, The Eric Morecambe Centre. It has grown to become a sports and recreation hub with a diverse range of facilities including football pitches, floodlit tennis courts and netball courts, cricket and a MUGA which is used for 5-a-side football, hockey and exercise classes. In 2023 Rothamsted Park's artificial grass football pitch was opened, a new home for Harpenden Town FC and Colts FC and a first class addition to the Park. There is also a children's play area with three nature themed zones for different age groups.

Harpenden Town Council (which has owned the Park since 2021) has published several guides including a walking guide and tree trail. More information can be found on their website (See References).
