= Harpenden =

Town in Hertfordshire, England

Coordinates: 51.8175°N 0.3524°W

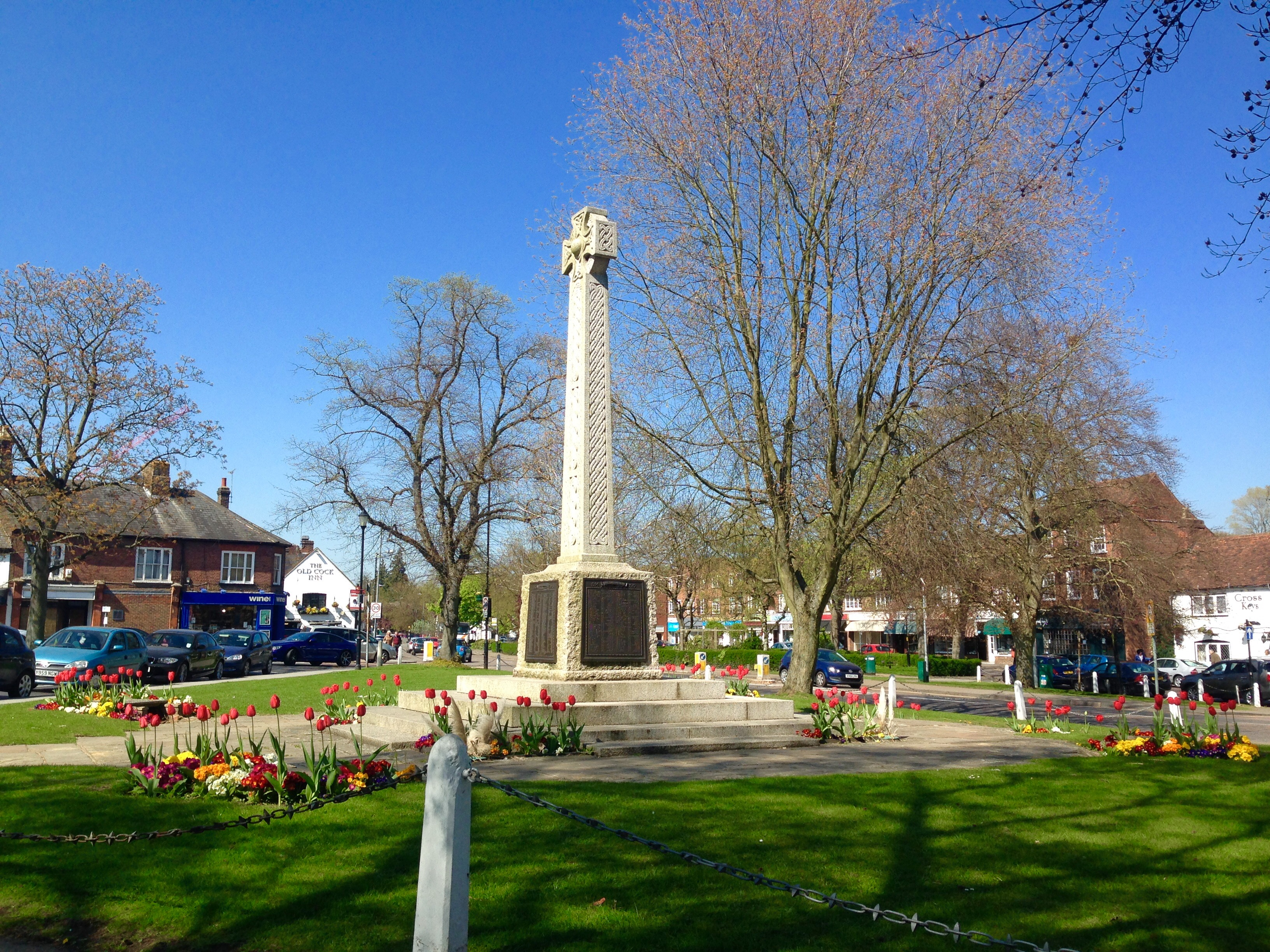
- Church Green in Harpenden town centre in spring

- Location within Hertfordshire
- Area: 4.93 sq mi (12.8 km^{2})
- Population: 31,128 (2021: parish); 30,674 (2021: built-up area)
  - Density: 6,314/sq mi (2,438/km^{2})
- OS grid reference: TL135145
- Civil parish: Harpenden Town
- District: St Albans
- Shire county: Hertfordshire
- Region: East
- Country: England
- Sovereign state: United Kingdom
- Post town: HARPENDEN
- Postcode district: AL5
- Dialling code: 01582
- Police: Hertfordshire
- Fire: Hertfordshire
- Ambulance: East of England
- UK Parliament: Harpenden and Berkhamsted
- Website: Harpenden Town Council

Harpenden (/ˈhɑːrpəndən/) is a town and civil parish in the City and District of St Albans in the county of Hertfordshire, England. The population of the built-up area was 30,674 in the 2021 census and the population of the civil parish was 31,128. Harpenden is a commuter town, with a direct rail connection to Central London.

== History ==
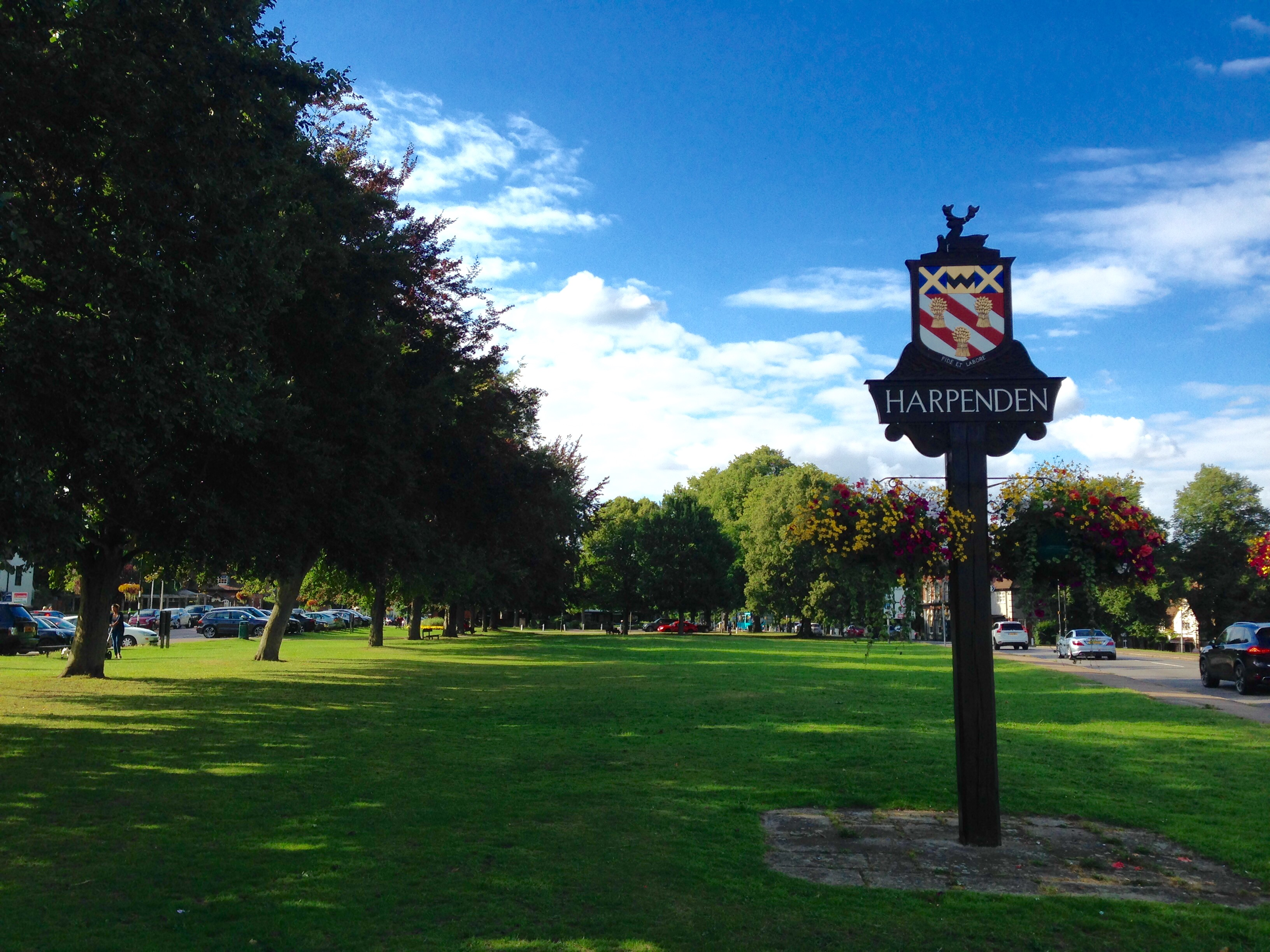
The Harpenden coat of arms sign before entering the town centre

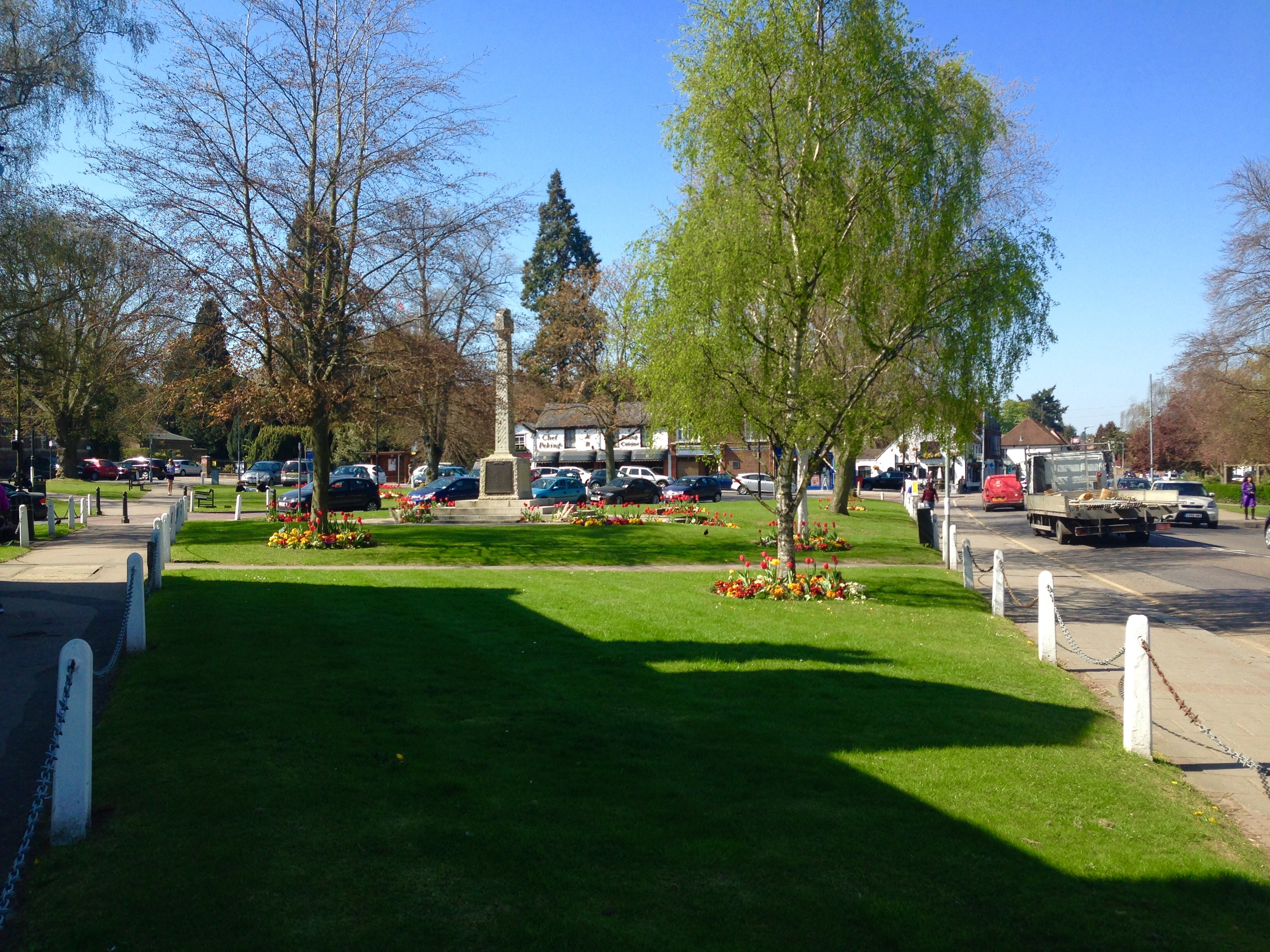
Church Green in Harpenden Town Centre

There is evidence of pre-Roman Belgic farmers in the area. In 1867 several items were found, including a bronze escutcheon, rams-head shaped mounts and a bronze bowl.

There are Roman remains in the land around Harpenden, such as the site of a mausoleum in the park at Rothamsted. A tumulus near the river Lea was opened in the 1820s and contained a stone sarcophagus of Romano-Celtic origin. Five objects dating from around 150 AD were inside, including a glass jug with a Mediterranean stamp and samian ware dishes used for libations.

The name Harpenden may derive from the Old English hearpedenu, meaning 'harp valley'. Another theory suggests that the name derives from herepæðdenu, meaning 'military road valley'. This theory is considered because Harpenden lies on the ancient St Albans - Luton road.

Up to the 13th century the area of the parish consisted of woodland with small hamlets and single farmsteads around cleared areas called "End" or "Green"; today there are 19 Ends and 18 Greens in the areas of Harpenden and Wheathampstead parishes.

Harpenden village grew out of Westminster Abbey's gradual clearing of woodland for farming and settlement within its Wheathampstead manor, granted by Edward the Confessor in 1060. The first reference to a parish church was in 1221 (when it was referred to as Harpendene) so it is inferred that the village grew up around then. The church of St Nicholas is the oldest church in the town, originally built as a Chapel of ease in 1217.

Just beyond the southern edge of the town lies Nomansland Common (sometimes simply called No Man's Land), upon which part of the Second Battle of St Albans was fought during the Wars of the Roses. Nomansland Common also saw the first annually contested steeplechase in England, in 1830, when it was organised by Thomas Coleman, and the last fight of 19th-century bare-knuckle fighter Simon Byrne. It was also the haunt of the highwaywoman Lady Katherine Ferrers, better known as the Wicked Lady.

A widespread but now little-known industry of Harpenden was straw-weaving, a trade mainly carried out by women in the 19th century. A good straw weaver could make as much as an agricultural labourer. The straw plaits were taken to specialist markets in St Albans or Luton and bought by dealers to be converted into straw items such as boaters and other hats or bonnets.

The arrival of the railway system from 1860 and the sale of farms for residential development after 1880 radically changed Harpenden's surroundings. First the Dunstable Branch of the Great Northern Railway passed through the Batford area, with a station later named Harpenden East railway station. (This line is now closed and forms a cycle track.) The Midland Railway main line was built in 1868 with a station near the main village, which still exists today, and the listed Southdown Road Skew Bridge nearby. The Harpenden and Hemel Hempstead Railway, known locally as the Nickey Line, was opened in 1877.

Between 1848 and 1914 the common was a regular venue for horse racing. In his History of Hertfordshire in 1879, John Edwin Cussans commented "Notwithstanding that these meetings are under the most unexceptional patronage as regards the Stewards, yet for two days in the year all the London pickpockets, sharpers and blackguards who happen to be out of gaol are permitted to make Harpenden their own and to make travelling in a first-class carriage on the Midland Railway a danger to men and an impossibility to ladies." Golf has been played on the Common since 1894 and it was at that time Harpenden Golf Club was set up by a group of Harpenden people with the help and a financial contribution of £5 from Sir John Bennet Lawes of Rothamsted Manor. The club moved to a new course at Hammonds End in 1931, at which time Harpenden Common Golf Club was formed by those who wanted to remain at the Common. In 1932 Bamville Cricket club was formed and shares part of the Common with the golfers.

Harpenden is the home of Rothamsted Manor and Rothamsted Research (formerly Rothamsted Experimental Station and later the Institute of Arable Crops Research), a leading centre for agricultural research. In front of its main building, which faces the common, is a stone, erected in 1893, commemorating 50 years of experiments by Sir John Bennet Lawes and Joseph Henry Gilbert.

Lawes inherited the family estate at Rothamsted in 1834. He was acknowledged as the father of agricultural science and his early field experiments on Hertfordshire farms led him to patent a phosphate fertiliser, the sales of which enriched him immensely. With the proceeds he established the experimental station, building laboratories in the 1850s. The station continued the development of the artificial fertilisers on which most modern farmers now depend. Some of the long-term 'classical field experiments' begun by Lawes and Gilbert remain in place to this day (such as Broadbalk) representing a unique resource for agricultural and environmental research.

In 1913 the National Children's Home moved to Harpenden with a large site Highfield Oval, which was home to more than 200 children. The site featured a print works, a carpenters' and joiners' shop, a bootmakers’ shop and a farm where boys undertook apprenticeships. Girls were mainly trained in domestic service and some in sewing and office work. The children lived in a "family" of 8-10 children, each run by a sister or house mother. The chapel was gift from Joseph Rank and was built in 1928. The home was run on site until 1985. The site is now the head office of Youth with a Mission, an international Christian missionary organization. The Harpenden Growth Study, one of the earliest longitudinal studies, was overseen by James Mourilyan Tanner and monitored the development of many of the children over a number of years.

During the Second World War Harpenden was used to evacuate children from heavily bombed London. However Harpenden was not totally confident in its safety, as evidenced by the now decaying Bowers Parade air raid shelters, soon to be secured for the future. It has been suggested that it be used for both educational and emergency-training purposes.

The Harpenden and District Local History Society has a collection of local material and archives, which can be consulted, and holds regular meetings on topics of historical interest.

== Geography ==
There are two civil parishes: Harpenden and Harpenden Rural. The town straddles two valleys: a dry valley to the south-west containing the town centre and Harpenden Common, and the valley of the River Lea to the north-east, containing the Batford area.

Owing to its proximity and railway link to London, as well as its high-end housing, Harpenden is an area of extremely high property prices. Land Registry data suggests that the average house price in Harpenden in the first quarter of 2006 was £500,902, compared with £287,277 for the St Albans district generally and £183,598 nationally. The data also indicates that an unusually high proportion of houses in Harpenden are owner-occupied (81.4%, as opposed to 69.6% in the district generally and 66.2% nationally). The average price of a detached house was more than £900,000 in January 2012.

Harpenden has a large number of its streets named after English literary figures on the east side of the town (an area known, unsurprisingly, as the Poets' Corner), including Byron Road, Cowper Road, Kipling Way, Milton Road, Shakespeare Road, Spenser Road, Shelley Court, Tennyson Road, Townsend Road, Masefield Road and Wordsworth Road.

=== Climate ===
Climate data for Rothamsted (1991–2020)
Month	Jan	Feb	Mar	Apr	May	Jun	Jul	Aug	Sep	Oct	Nov	Dec	Year
Mean daily maximum °C (°F)	7.1 (44.8)	7.6 (45.7)	10.3 (50.5)	13.4 (56.1)	16.6 (61.9)	19.6 (67.3)	22.1 (71.8)	21.7 (71.1)	18.6 (65.5)	14.3 (57.7)	10.1 (50.2)	7.4 (45.3)	14.1 (57.4)
Mean daily minimum °C (°F)	1.6 (34.9)	1.5 (34.7)	2.8 (37.0)	4.5 (40.1)	7.3 (45.1)	10.2 (50.4)	12.3 (54.1)	12.3 (54.1)	10.1 (50.2)	7.5 (45.5)	4.2 (39.6)	2.0 (35.6)	6.4 (43.5)
Average rainfall mm (inches)	67.5 (2.66)	50.9 (2.00)	42.7 (1.68)	51.2 (2.02)	51.2 (2.02)	52.9 (2.08)	52.2 (2.06)	68.2 (2.69)	55.4 (2.18)	78.2 (3.08)	76.8 (3.02)	67.2 (2.65)	714.5 (28.13)
Average rainy days (≥ 1 mm)	12.2	10.4	9.2	9.5	8.4	8.3	8.5	9.5	8.9	11.4	12.1	11.8	120.2
Mean monthly sunshine hours	60.0	78.3	119.1	165.9	202.5	205.2	209.0	194.4	149.8	111.5	69.2	56.0	1,620.9
Source: Met Office

== Governance ==
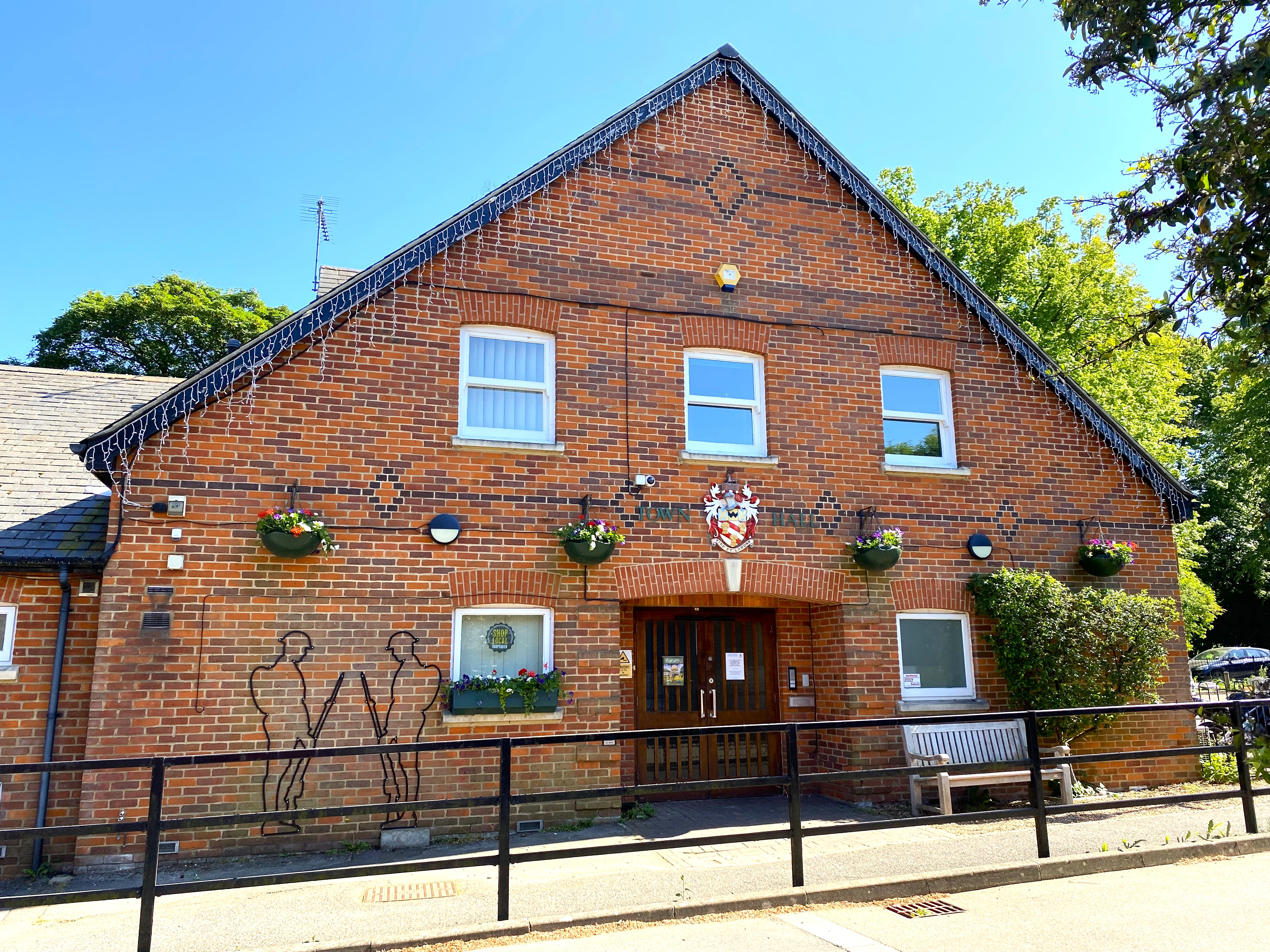
Harpenden Town Hall, Leyton Road

There are three tiers of local government covering Harpenden, at parish (town), district and county level: Harpenden Town Council, St Albans City and District Council and Hertfordshire County Council. The town council is based at Harpenden Town Hall on Leyton Road.

Coat of arms of Harpenden Town Council
Notes Granted 4 February 1949 to Harpenden Urban District Council. Crest On a Wreath of the Colours within Wattled Palings proper a Mount Vert thereon a Hart lodged also proper Escutcheon Bendy of six Gules and Argent three Garbs Or a Chief Azure thereon a Pale between two Saltires throughout of the third a Fess dancetté Sable Motto Fide Et Laborare (By Faith And Industry)

Harpenden is also part of the Harpenden and Berkhamsted UK Parliament constituency, represented by Victoria Collins of the Liberal Democrats.

=== Administrative history ===
Harpenden was anciently part of the parish of Wheathampstead, in the hundred of Dacorum. The chapelry of Harpenden was treated as a separate civil parish from an early date, having its own church wardens and parish registers from the sixteenth century. An order to create a separate parish of Harpenden was made in 1656, but does not appear to have been carried out. Harpenden was eventually made a separate ecclesiastical parish in 1859.

From 1835 Harpenden was included within the St Albans Poor Law Union. As such, Harpenden became part of the St Albans Rural Sanitary District in 1872, which in turn became the St Albans Rural District under the Local Government Act 1894. The 1894 Act also created parish councils. Harpenden Parish Council held its first meeting on 31 December 1894, with Captain Arthur Lydekker, a Conservative, being elected the first chairman. The parish council held its meetings at the Harpenden Institute at 12 Southdown Road (then called Wheathampstead Road).

Harpenden
- Urban District
- Population
  - 1901: 4,725
  - 1971: 23,600
- History
  - Created: 15 April 1898
  - Abolished: 31 March 1974
  - Succeeded by: St Albans City and District
  - HQ: Harpenden
- Contained within
  - County Council: Hertfordshire

Shortly after the creation of St Albans Rural District, efforts began to make Harpenden an urban district. It was decided that the whole parish of Harpenden was not suitable to become an urban district, with the west of the parish remaining largely rural. As such, Harpenden was split into two parishes on 15 April 1898, called Harpenden Urban and Harpenden Rural. The Harpenden Rural parish remained part of St Albans Rural District, whilst the Harpenden Urban parish became independent as Harpenden Urban District. Arthur Lydekker, who had been chairman of the old Harpenden Parish Council, was appointed the first chairman of Harpenden Urban District Council.

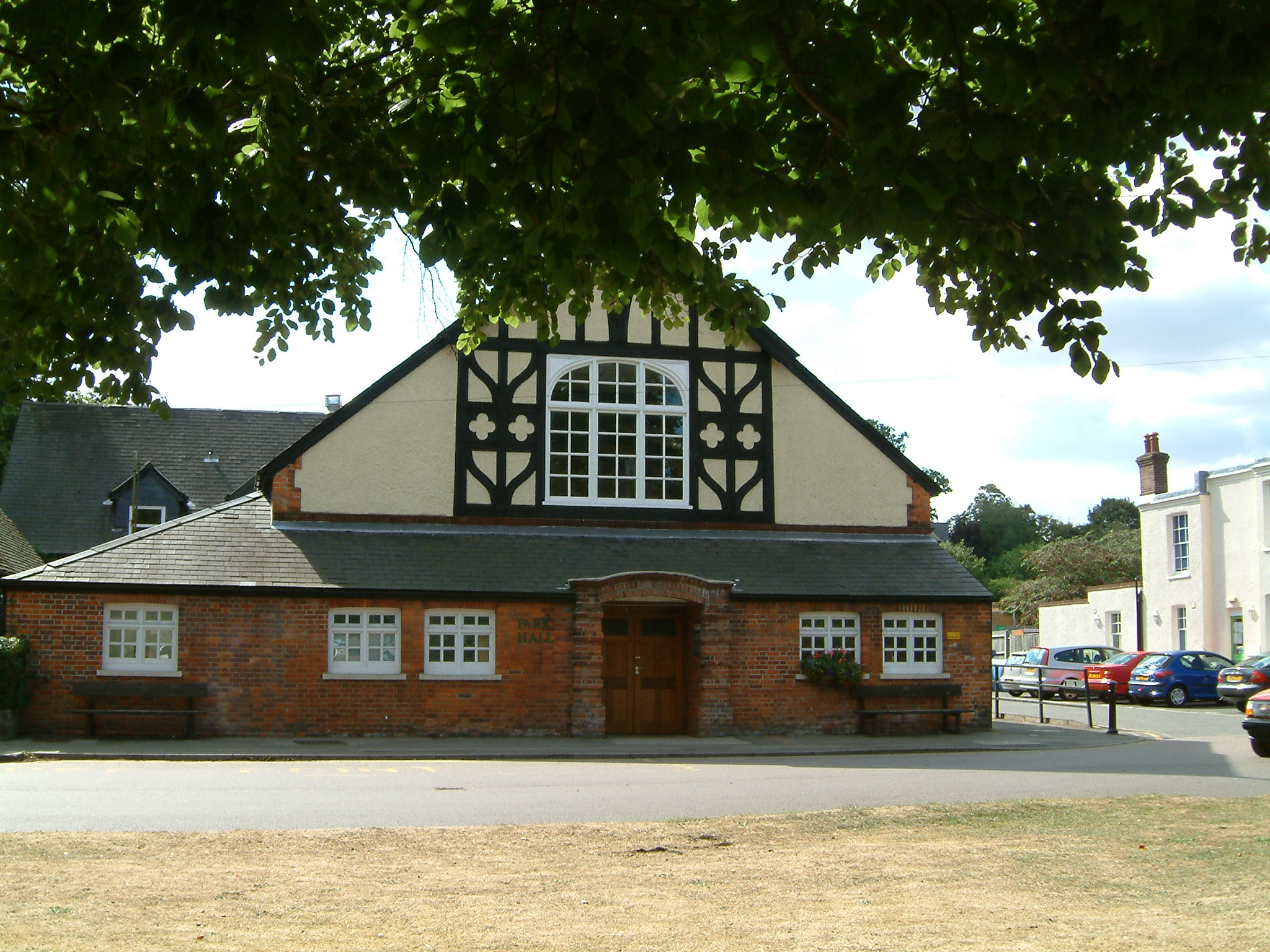
Park Hall, Harpenden

Until September 1899, Harpenden Urban District Council held its meetings at the Harpenden Institute, as the parish council had done. On the opposite side of the Common was the British School on Leyton Road. The school had been built in 1850 but was vacated in 1897 when the school moved to new premises on Victoria Road. The council took a lease of the old British School from its owners, the Lawes family of Rothamsted, and the building was opened as the "Public Hall" in September 1899, acting as the council's meeting place and offices, as well as providing a public hall.

In 1932, the council bought Harpenden Hall at 6 Southdown Road for £7,000 and converted it to act as offices and meeting place, moving into the building in early 1933. A new Public Hall was built in the former gardens of Harpenden Hall in 1938. The old public hall on Leyton Road became known as Park Hall.

The council was granted a coat of arms on 4 February 1949.

Harpenden Urban District Council was abolished under the Local Government Act 1972, becoming part of the new district of St Albans on 1 April 1974. A successor parish was created for the former urban district, with its parish council taking the name Harpenden Town Council. The town council continued to be based at Harpenden Hall until 1996, when it moved to a new Town Hall built as a rear extension to the urban district council's former home of Park Hall.

== Transport ==
=== Railway ===
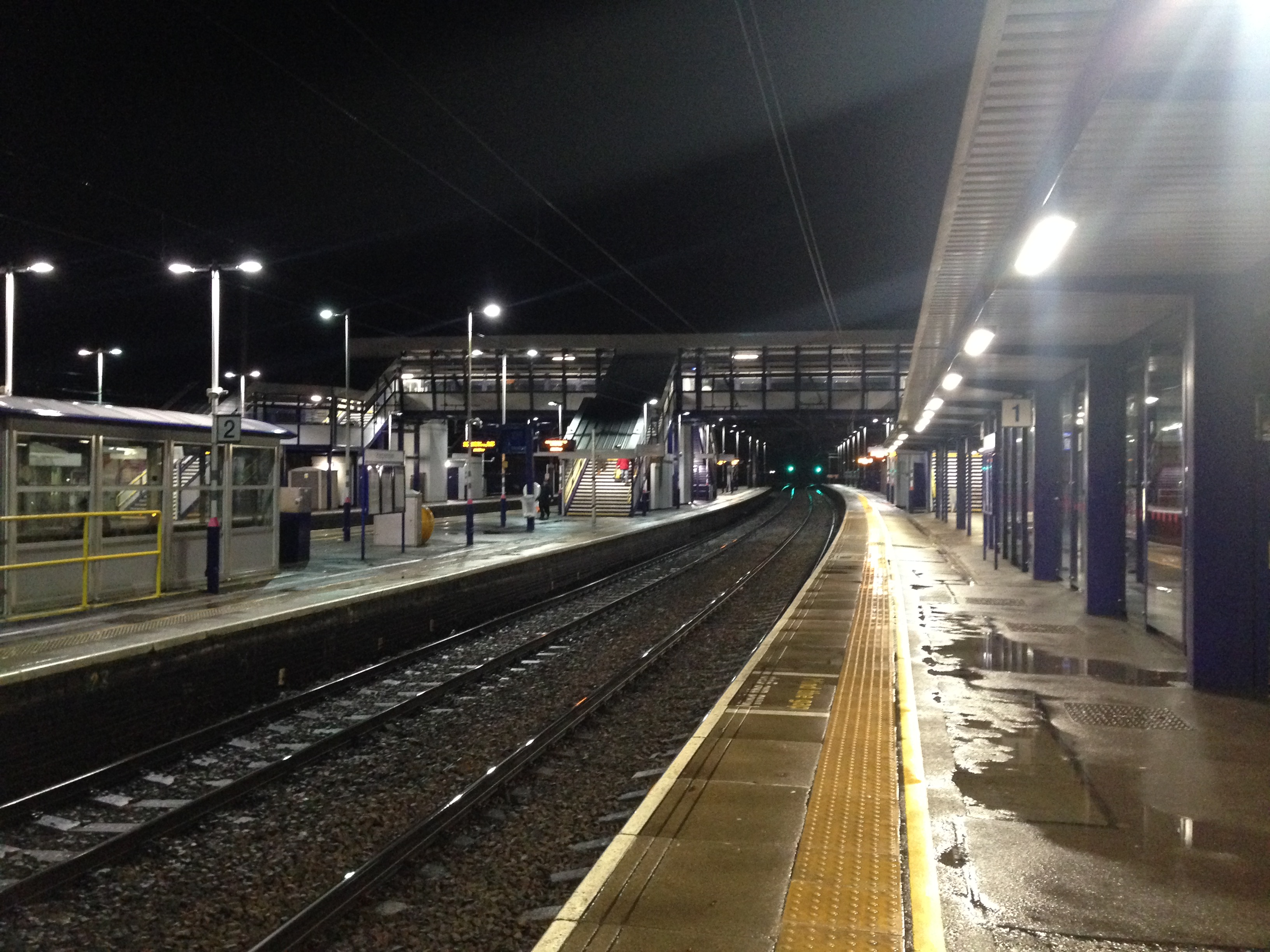
The view north from platform 1 at Harpenden station

Harpenden railway station is a stop on the Thameslink route. Govia Thameslink Railway operates frequent services between Bedford, Luton, St Albans City and London St Pancras. Southbound services continue through Farringdon and London Blackfriars, then on to Brighton (via Gatwick Airport), Three Bridges or Rainham. The rail link therefore gives direct access to Luton Airport (one stop north) and Gatwick Airport, taking approximately 1hr 10 m on a limited stops train.

The Nickey Line railway linked Harpenden, Redbourn and Hemel Hempstead; Roundwood Halt also served the north-west of the town. The line opened in 1877 and was closed in 1979; the trackbed was converted to a shared-use path in 1985, forming part of the National Cycle Network. The Hertford, Luton and Dunstable Railway also ran through the former Harpenden East railway station to Dunstable Town via Luton Bute Street, and to Hatfield via Welwyn Garden City, opening in 1860 and closing in 1965.

=== Roads ===
The A6 used to run through Harpenden, although the road numbering was changed to avoid congestion. The M1 runs nearby, with access from junction 9 at Redbourn and Dunstable or alternatively at junction 10 for Luton Airport.

=== Buses ===
The town is served by several bus operators, including Arriva Shires & Essex, Centrebus, Red Eagle Travel, Red Rose and Uno. The main routes are:

Route number	Route	Operator	Operation
321	Luton station to Watford, via St Albans	Arriva Shires & Essex	Every 20 minutes (Monday–Saturday) Every 60 minutes (Sunday)
366	Luton station to South Hatfield, via Welwyn Garden City	Centrebus	Every 60 minutes (Monday–Friday)
610	Luton station to Cockfosters station via Hatfield	Uno	Every 60 minutes (Monday–Saturday)
357	Harpenden to St Albans, via Wheathampstead (extending to Redbourn on schooldays)	Arriva Shires & Essex	Every 60 minutes (Monday–Saturday)

Harpenden also has a charity-run community HH1 bus service called the Harpenden Hopper, which is a hail and ride service operating around the town on weekdays.

== Economy ==
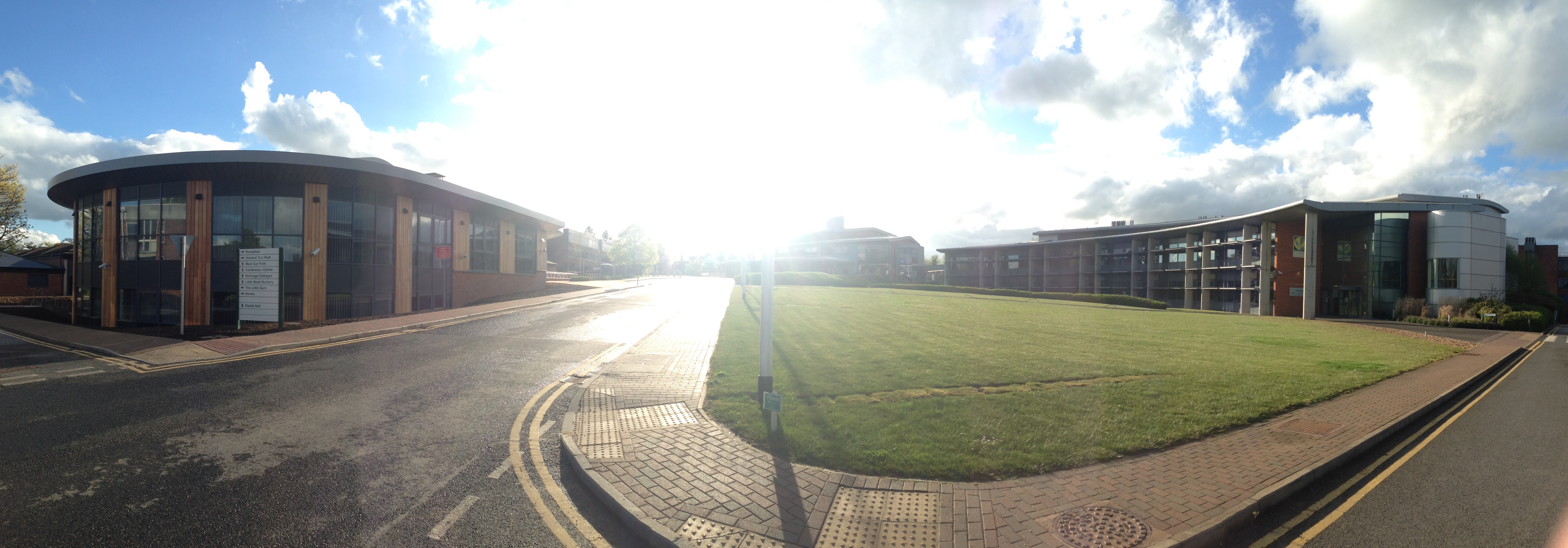
Rothamsted Research is the largest agricultural research centre in the United Kingdom

Harpenden is a prosperous town. In an analysis of the average income tax paid by constituency, Hitchin and Harpenden came tenth. In a list of the most valuable commuter areas compiled by Savills Research, Harpenden came seventh. Good transport links to central London have been cited as a key factor.

Rothamsted Research, the largest agricultural research centre in the UK, is based in Harpenden. It was founded in 1843.

== Shopping ==
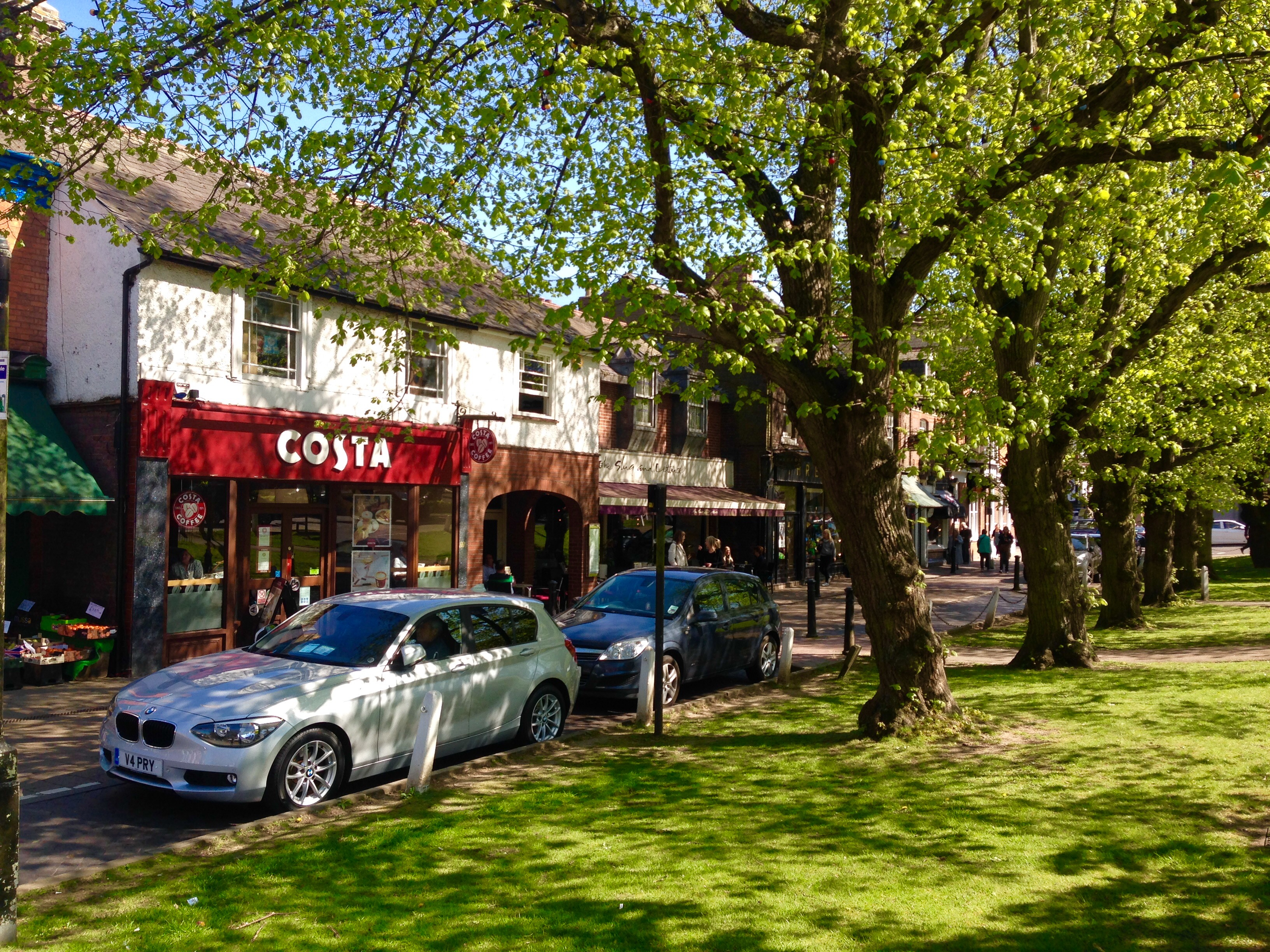
Costa Coffee in the Town Centre during Spring

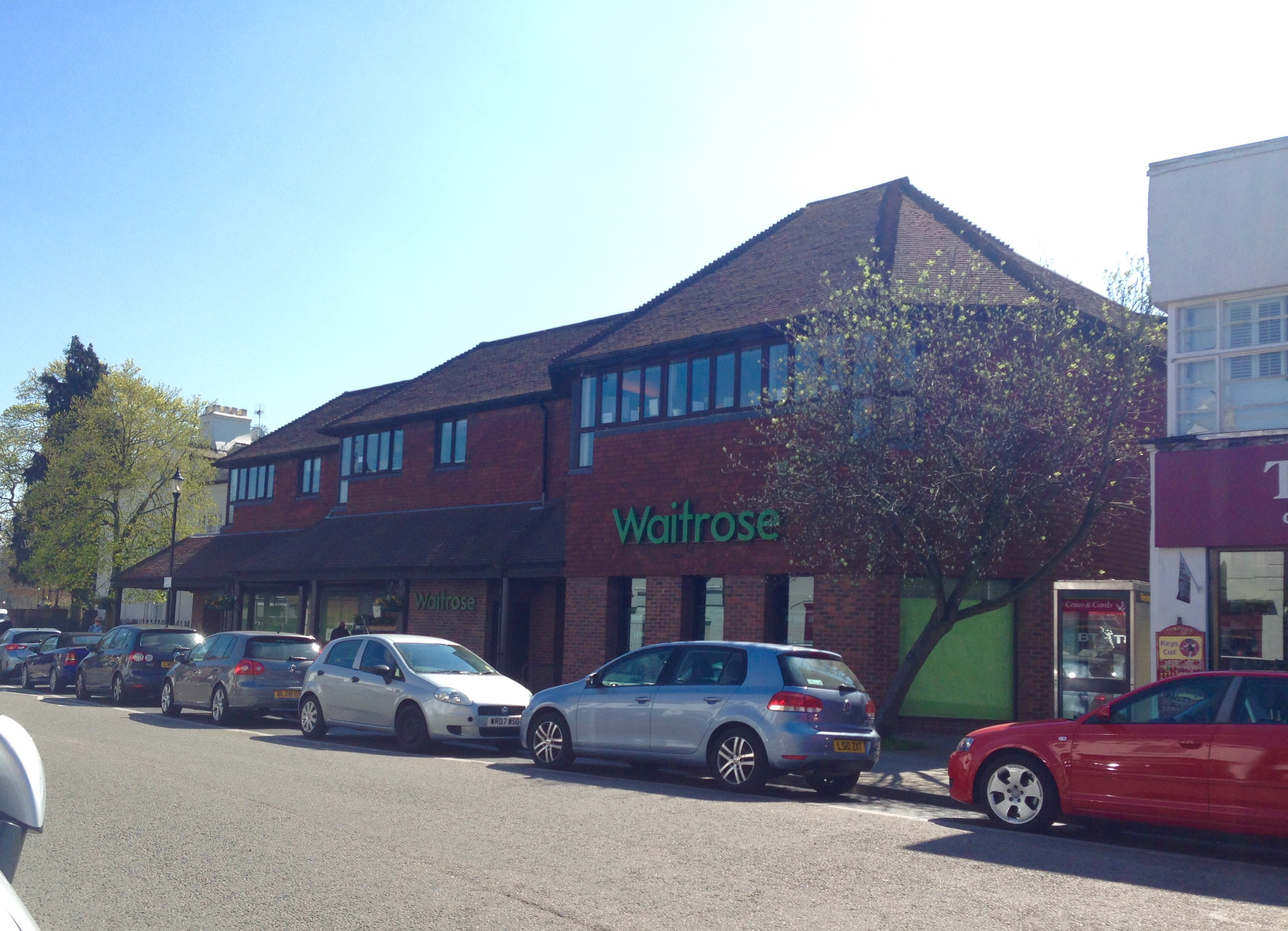
Waitrose supermarket in town centre

Harpenden has many shops commonly found in other English towns, with three central supermarkets (Sainsbury's, Marks and Spencer, and Waitrose), multiple female clothes shops, charity shops, banks, estate agents and chemists. A good proportion of these are run by independent retailers. Cafes are also common in Harpenden, but with only three commercial chains (Costa Coffee, Caffè Nero, and Gail's); the rest are owned independently. There are multiple restaurants, mainly of Italian origin, and many pubs. Batford, Southdown, and Luton Road districts also have their own shopping areas.

== Parks and commons ==
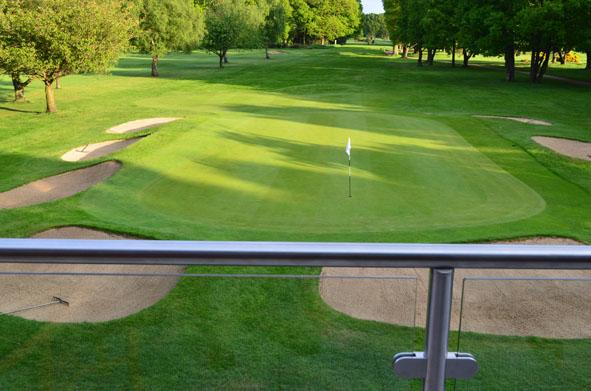
A view of Harpenden Common Golf Club

A notable feature of Harpenden is its abundant parks and commons. The central area of Harpenden is characterised by Church Green, Leyton Green and the High Street Greens, which give the town its provincial feel.

Just south of the town centre is Harpenden Common, stretching from the shops in the town centre for more than one mile (1.5 kilometres) to the south, encompassing a total of 238 acres (96 hectares). Today Harpenden Common hosts two cricket clubs: Harpenden Cricket Club, a Hertfordshire Premier League club that celebrated its 150 anniversary in 2013, and Bamville Cricket Club, which plays on Sundays on the golf course. There is also a football club, bridleways, ramblers' paths and Harpenden Common Golf Club, all contained in an area of natural beauty that was awarded a national Green Flag Award in 2007. Harpenden Town Council is keen to help retain and maintain the environment and oversees habitat management, including bird and bat watching, and the maintenance/regeneration of gorse, fungi and other fauna and flora for the benefit of the people of Harpenden.

Since 1894, Harpenden Common Golf Club has traditionally maintained a large part of the common and today works closely with Harpenden Town Council and countryside management. This partnership has enabled the people of Harpenden to take full advantage of the common for all kinds of leisure activities.

In addition the town has large green public spaces available in Rothamsted Park, Batford Park, Kinsbourne Green, Lydekker Park and the Nickey Line, which bisects the town.

Just to the south of Harpenden is the large expanse of Nomansland Common.

== Education ==
Harpenden has four secondary schools:

- St George's School, a co-educational Christian day and boarding school and specialist Technology, and Language College.
- Sir John Lawes School, a specialist media Arts College, Science College and teacher training college.
- Roundwood Park School
- Katherine Warington School.

Harpenden has a number of state primary schools, including:

- Manland Primary School
- Crabtree Infants' and Junior Schools
- Roundwood Primary School
- The Grove Infant & Nursery and Junior Schools
- High Beeches Primary School
- Wood End School
- Sauncey Wood Primary School
- The Lea Primary School and Nursery
- Harpenden Academy

It also has three private schools:

- Aldwickbury School, an independent all-boys preparatory school (years Reception to 8).
- The King's School, an independent Christian school (pre-school age to year 11).
- St Hilda's School, an independent primary school for girls (years Reception to 6).

== Twinning ==
Harpenden is twinned with:

- Cosne-Cours-sur-Loire, France
- Alzey, Germany

== Events ==
Harpenden Lions Highland Gathering continues a tradition that began in 1946. The Gathering is held every July in Rothamsted Park and typically attracts around 6,000 visitors. It claims to be the largest UK Highland Gathering outside Scotland. It raises many thousands of pounds each year for charities nominated by Harpenden Lions Club, which runs the event.

An annual classic car show, Classics on the Common, is held on the fourth Wednesday in July, attracting over 10,000 visitors and 1,300 cars. One of the biggest events of its type in Europe, it is a free event, run by Rotary in Harpenden, with any profits collected going to charity.

The annual HERTS 10K run in aid of Rennie Grove Hospice Care takes place on the second Sunday in October. The event attracts thousands of runners and walkers, making it one of the biggest 10k runs in Hertfordshire. The event starts and finishes at Rothamsted Research.

== Notable residents ==
- Sacha Bennett, actor, writer, director and producer was born and raised in Harpenden, attending St. George's School
- Julian Bliss, international clarinettist and child prodigy was born and raised in Harpenden
- Steve Borthwick, former England and Saracens rugby captain and current England Head Coach lives in Harpenden
- Steve Bould, former professional footballer and current Arsenal assistant manager
- Ken Brown, who played in the Ryder Cup and is now a commentator for major golf competitions, such as the Open, grew up and still lives in Harpenden and is a member of Harpenden Common Golf Club
- Craig Charles, DJ, comedian and actor in Red Dwarf and Coronation Street and host of the Funk and Soul Show and Robot Wars lived in Harpenden.
- Ralph Chubb, poet, artist and printer was born here in 1892
- Dave Clarke, visually impaired Paralympic GB football captain.
- George W. Cooke, deputy director of Rothamsted Experimental Station
- Donald Coxeter, 20th century geometer attended St George's School
- Joanna Dennehy, serial killer responsible for the Peterborough ditch murders, grew up in Harpenden.
- Elaine Delmar, singer and actress, born in Harpenden
- Matt Dickinson, Everest mountaineer, author, scriptwriter and director
- Lee Dixon, former Arsenal footballer
- Ferdinand Walsin Esterhazy, a spy for the German Empire, at the heart of the Dreyfus affair, fled from France in 1898 and lived in Milton Road until his death in 1923. He is buried in St Nicholas' churchyard under the false name of Jean de Voilemont.
- Siobhan Fahey, singer in Bananarama, lived in Harpenden when she was aged 14 to 16. She attended Sir John Lawes School for those two years.
- Andy Farrell, former Wigan and Great Britain rugby league captain and Saracens and England rugby union player and currently Head Coach of the Ireland rugby union national men's team, lived in the town.
- Owen Farrell, rugby player for Saracens and England and a former member of St George's School
- Ronald Fisher (1890–1962), a statistician "who almost single-handedly created the foundations for modern statistical science". worked at Rothamsted Experimental Station
- Ben Foden, Northampton Saints and England International Rugby Union player
- Charles Henry Gimingham (1923–2018), botanist, was born in Harpenden
- Miles Golding, classical musician and violinist of Split Enz
- Martin Gore from the band Depeche Mode
- Laura Haddock, actress who appeared in Guardians of the Galaxy and other films, went to school in Harpenden
- Mick Harford, former England international footballer and manager. Currently working for Luton Town Football Club, of which he was previously manager.
- Una Healy, singer from The Saturdays
- Steve Hewlett (1958–2017), former presenter of The Media Show on BBC Radio 4
- George Hogg, British journalist who rescued 50 orphaned children in China during the Japanese occupation
- Charlie Hutchison, British communist, liberator of Belsen concentration camp and the only black British International Brigades volunteer, spent several years in an orphanage in Harpenden.
- Frank Ifield, Australian singer and yodeller lived in Harpenden
- Guy Johnston, cello soloist and winner of BBC Young Musician of the Year in 2000
- Caroline Jones, fundraiser and Cancer Research UK volunteer who received the Points of Light in 2015
- John Keane, artist, was born here and grew up in Wordsworth Road.
- Stanley Kubrick, filmmaker, lived and died in nearby Childwickbury Manor
- Henry Lawson, Australian writer, lived in Spring Villa, Cowper Road, Harpenden from July to September 1900
- Joe Lenzie, music producer and DJ, was born in Harpenden and attended Sir John Lawes School.
- Terry Lightfoot, jazz clarinettist, ran the Three Horseshoes pub for five years during the late 1970s
- Andy Linighan, former Arsenal footballer, lived in Bewdley Close, Southdown.
- Richard Lydekker (1849–1915), naturalist and geologist
- James Mardall (1899–1988), first-class cricketer and British Army officer
- Doug McAvoy, late General Secretary of the National Union of Teachers, lived in Harpenden between 1975 and 1990
- Joan Moore, botanist (1920–1986)
- Eric Morecambe, comedian, lived in Harpenden, close to his beloved Luton Town FC. His funeral and burial took place in St Nicholas Church. The Eric Morecambe Centre public entertainment facility is named after him
- Albert Moses, an actor who starred in Mind Your Language playing Punjabi student Ranjeet Singh and a number of James Bond films
- John Motson, Football commentator
- Andrew Neal, professional cricketer for Hampshire County Cricket Club, played cricket for Harpenden cricket club in both junior and senior cricket
- Spencer Pickering (1858–1920), chemist, retired to Harpenden following a chemical accident, one of five Royal Society Fellows in the town at that time.
- Tim Rice, the composer, attended Aldwickbury School
- David Richardson, music producer, audio engineer, musician and founder of Sound Recording Technology, was born and lives in Harpenden
- David Roberts (born 1942), cricketer
- Sir E. John Russell (1872–1965), soil chemist, agriculture scientist, director of Rothamsted Experimental Station 1912-1943.
- Edward James Salisbury (1886–1978), botanist and ecologist
- David Sharp, mountaineer who died near the summit of Mount Everest
- Tim Sherwood, former Tottenham Hotspur and Blackburn Rovers player who lived in Harpenden during his coaching days at Tottenham
- Christopher Smith (MP) (d. 1589), owner of Annables Manor in Harpenden.
- Sir Robert Stephen John Sparks, eminent volcanologist, was born in Harpenden. His former PhD student Prof Claire Horwell also grew up in Harpenden.
- Christopher Strauli, actor, who starred in Only When I Laugh and Full House was born in Harpenden
- Dame Ellen Terry, actress (1847–1928), lived in Harpenden from 1868 to 1874
- Camilla Tominey, journalist
- Katherine Warington, research botanist (1897–1993), born and lived in Harpenden; worked at Rothamsted Experimental Station
- Jack Wilshere, West Ham and England international footballer
- Sir John Wittewronge, owned and lived at Rothamsted Manor, where in the seventeenth century he kept a weather and gardening diary which has very early records of rain, temperature and winds
- Ashley Young, former Manchester United and England international footballer
- Richard Youngs alternative musician, grew up in the town and recorded several albums there, especially Lake and Advent
- Marc Aspland, photographer

== Culture ==
Harpenden Public Halls was a 410-seat live music and theatre venue in the town centre. It was replaced in 2021 with the newly built Eric Morecambe Centre in nearby Rothamsted Park, which is a 511-seat multi function space. The Public Halls site will be reused for housing.

Harpenden is also home to Musicale, a music school and music shop on the site of St George's School providing instrumental and vocal training to adults and children. It runs several orchestras and bands.

Other music groups based in Harpenden include The Lea Singers, Hardynge Choir, Magic Voices, Harpenden Choral Society, Music Makers, Harpenden Concert Band and Harpenden Musical Theatre Company.

As of September 2023, a new cultural hub Harpenden Arts Centre is set to launch as a fully accessible arts venue with a state of the art performance venue and rehearsal spaces for dance, music and drama.

Harpenden is also home to the Harpenden Live festival, which takes place in July every two years to promote new musical artists in Harpenden, Hertfordshire, and beyond.

== Sport ==
Harpenden is home to various sports clubs. A selection are listed below:

- Harpenden Cricket Club
- Harpenden Town Football Club
- Harpenden Rugby Football Club
- Harpenden Lawn Tennis Club
- Harpenden Colts Football Club
- Harpenden Common Golf Club

== Voluntary organisations ==
- Harpenden Lions Club
- Harpenden Village Rotary Club
- Round Table
- Probus
- Ladies' Circle
- Lea Singers

== Scouting and Guiding in Harpenden ==
There is scouting in Harpenden. Scout groups fall under the heading of the Harpenden and Wheathampstead District Scouts.

As well as taking part in a number of volunteer roles and marching in both the Remembrance and St George's Day parades, they are involved in the Harpenden and Wheathampstead District Scout Gang Show, an annual variety show. The Harpenden Gang Show is the world's longest continuously running Gang Show, with a performance every year since 1949.

There are also several Guide units in Harpenden. Guides take part in the Remembrance Sunday and St George's Day parades alongside the Scouts and have younger counterparts called Rainbows and Brownies.

== Freedom of the Town ==
The following people and military units have received the Freedom of the Town of Harpenden.

=== Military Units ===
- The Royal Anglian Regiment: 12 September 2013.
