= John Keane (artist) =

British artist

Mo Mowlam by John Keane, 2001

John Granville Colpoys Keane (born 12 September 1954) is a British artist, whose paintings have contemporary political and social themes.

== Life and work ==
John Keane was born in Harpenden, Hertfordshire, England. He was educated at Wellington College (1968–72) and Camberwell School of Art (1972–76).

He is a political painter, whose subjects often concern contentious political, social and military issues.

In 1990, the Imperial War Museum commissioned him as an official war artist in the Gulf War.

2001–02, he exhibited paintings which were derived from an expedition with Greenpeace during their campaign in the Amazon against illegal logging.

In 2002, he painted Mo Mowlam, former Secretary of State for Northern Ireland. The original idea was to represent her with other major figures in the Good Friday Agreement (Gerry Adams, John Hume and David Trimble), but four years of talks as to where the individuals should be placed ended with Trimble's withdrawal and the plan was abandoned.

In 2004, he toured his show, The Inconvenience of History, internationally. This was based on trips in liaison with Christian Aid to the West Bank and Gaza Strip. He also worked on paintings about the 2002 Moscow Theatre siege, using documentary footage as a source: "The process has continued my methods of developing the imagery with the aid of a computer, prior to committing paint to canvas in works both large and small scale."

In 2006, 57 Hours in the House of Culture was a show at Flowers East gallery, London, and Sakharov Museum, Moscow, about the Chechen War.

His more recent work, Guantanamerica, bases paintings about "issues of representation and dehumanisation of detainees at Guantánamo Bay" on low resolution internet files.

In 2010, he became known for a commissioned portrait of the former Secretary General of the UN Kofi Annan.

In November 2019, along with other public figures, Keane signed a letter supporting Labour Party leader Jeremy Corbyn describing him as "a beacon of hope in the struggle against emergent far-right nationalism, xenophobia and racism in much of the democratic world" and endorsed him in the 2019 UK general election.

He is a visiting research fellow at Camberwell College of Arts.

== Residencies and commissions ==
These include:

- 2002 Project in Israel with Christian Aid
- 2005 Portrait for the National Portrait Gallery of Sir Bill Morris
- 2006 Portrait for the BBC of Greg Dyke
- 2006 Project in Angola with Christian Aid

== Bibliography ==
Exhibition Catalogues

- John Keane: Back to Fundamentals [Catalogue of the exhibition held at Flowers East 14 February – 14 March 2003] London.
- John Keane: Fifty Seven Hours in the House of Culture [Catalogue of the exhibition held at Flowers East 31 March – 30 April 2006] London.
- John Keane: Guantanamerica [Catalogue of the exhibition held at Flowers 2006] New York.
- John Keane: Gulf [Catalogue of the exhibition held at The Imperial War Museum 26 March – 31 May 1992] London.
- John Keane: Intelligent Design [Catalogue of the exhibition held at Flowers East 20 March – 18 April 2009] London.
- John Keane: Making a Killing [Catalogue of the exhibition held at Flowers East 2000] London.
- John Keane: Saving the Bloody Planet [Catalogue of the exhibition held at Flowers East 2001] London.
- John Keane: The Struggle for the Control of the Television Station [Catalogue of the exhibition held at Flowers East 1 July – 1 August 1993] London.
- John Keane: Truth, Lies, & Super-8 [Catalogue of the exhibition held at Flowers East 27 September – 26 October 1997] London.

Monographs

- Lawson, M. (1995) Conflicts of Interest: John Keane. Mainstream Publishing, Edinburgh
