= Richard Clarkson =

British aeronautical engineer

- Born: 14 July 1904; London
- Died: 7 October 1996 (aged 92)
- Education: Clayesmore School
- Spouse: Sylvia Paice
- Children: 1 daughter
- Engineering career
- Discipline: Aeronautics
- Institutions: RAeS
- Employers: de Havilland (1925–1963); Hawker Siddeley (1963–1968)
- Significant design: Hawker Siddeley (DH) 121 Trident
- Significant advance: de Havilland Mosquito

Richard Milroy Clarkson OBE FCGI FRAeS (14 July 1904 – 7 October 1996) was a British aeronautical engineer with de Havilland, then Hawker Siddeley.

He led the design of the HS121 Trident wing, certain features of which were subsequently used for the Airbus A300 wing in the late 1960s.

== Family background ==
He was the eldest son of Mr Augustus Clarkson, of Hoo End Grange, Whitwell, Hertfordshire, who was the son of Augustus Clarkson (25 June 1834 - 8 January 1898) and Addy Gertrude Robinson (10 April 1845 - 30 May 1922). His great-grandfather was Peter Robinson (the father of his grandmother Addy) who founded Peter Robinson (department store), of which one of these stores became the first Topshop.

His mother was Claudia Agnes Walker, who married Augustus on 16 June 1903 at All Saints, Highgate. Claudia was the only sister of Charles Walker (engineer), the technical director of de Havilland, during the Second World War. His mother Claudia died on 9 June 1948.

His father Augustus died on 30 May 1956 aged 86.

== Early life ==
He was born at 'Lilleshall' on Bishopswood Road, in Highgate in north London. His sister was born on 3 December 1905. He had a brother, born on 9 April 1907, Godfrey, and another brother on 6 October 1909, Rodney. One brother died on 9 February 1934 in a motor accident

He attended Clayesmore School in Dorset.

His brother Rodney became Flying Officer Rodney Thomas Playford Clarkson; Playford was from Playford Hall.

His sister Margaret married on Saturday 28 July 1934 to Sqn Ldr Arthur Mostyn Wray, by the Bishop of Willesden, Guy Smith (bishop). Miss Joan Clarkson was a bridesmaid. Margaret Claudia Kathleen, their daughter, was born on 26 May 1936. Air Commodore Wray died aged 87 in April 1982, living in Langport, Somerset.

His brother Godfrey married Eileen Patricia Ward, the twin daughter of a priest at Rochester Cathedral, on 23 March 1949 at St Paul's Walden. On 24 April 1965 Patricia had daughter Sophia in Harpenden Memorial Hospital. On 26 September 1970 Patricia's husband died suddenly in Whitwell.

== Career ==
=== de Havilland ===
He joined de Havilland at Edgware in 1925. He was responsible for the aerodynamics of every de Havilland aircraft from 1935 to 1958; as a consequence, he was responsible for the aerodynamics of the de Havilland Mosquito. The first Mosquito W4050 flew in November 1940. He became Head of Aerodynamics in 1935, and Assistant Chief Engineer in 1941.

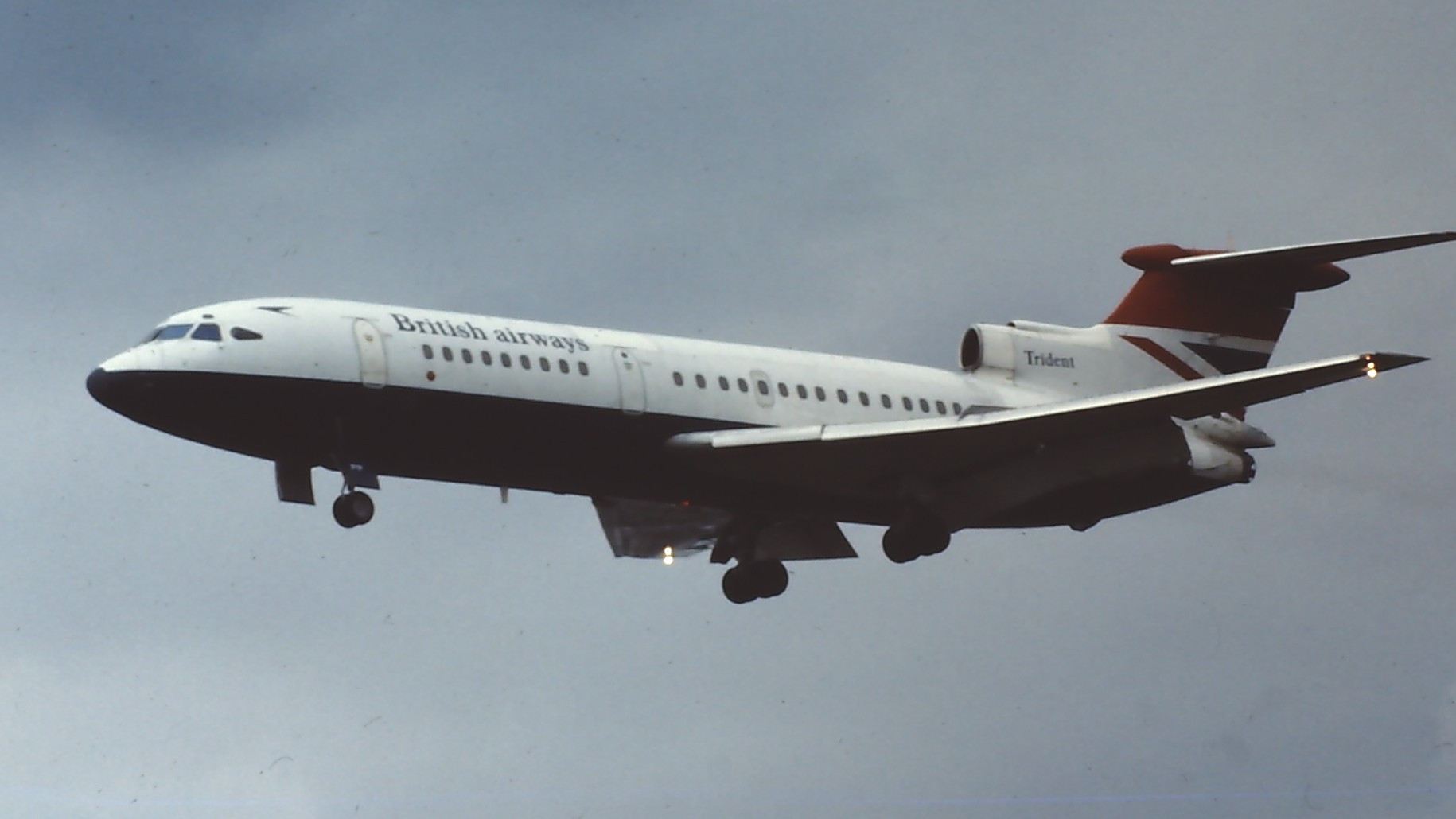
A DH 121 Trident

=== Hawker Siddeley Aviation ===
He was responsible for the aerodynamics of the DH.121 Trident and his team later designed the wing for the Airbus A300.

He retired in February 1969.

== Personal life ==
He lived at Whitwell, Hertfordshire in the 1930s.

He married Sylvia Wemyss Plaice (30 August 1912 - 25 March 2008), the daughter of Mr A Paice of Ryecroft Road in Streatham, on 20 April 1940 at Holy Trinity Brompton. They had one daughter, Gillian, born 16 November 1941 at Kingsley Nursing Home in Harpenden, with grandchildren Katrien, Charlotte, Saskia, and Richard.

He received the OBE in the 1950 New Year Honours. He lived at Kinsbourne Green near Harpenden in the 1950s.

In April 1964 he became a Fellow of City and Guilds. He received the Gold Medal of the Royal Aeronautical Society in 1966. From the Royal Society he received the Mullard Award in 1969 for his work on the Trident.

A neighbour in Whitwell in the 1960s was Sir Charles Trinder.

He died in Somerset in 1996.

== See also ==
- A. H. Tiltman, another de Havilland designer
- Tim Wilkins OBE, Chief Designer for de Havilland

Business positions
Preceded by	Research Director of de Havilland Aircraft (a division of HSA from 1963); 1958–1968	Succeeded by
