= Harpenden Common Golf Club =

Private golf club in Hertfordshire, England

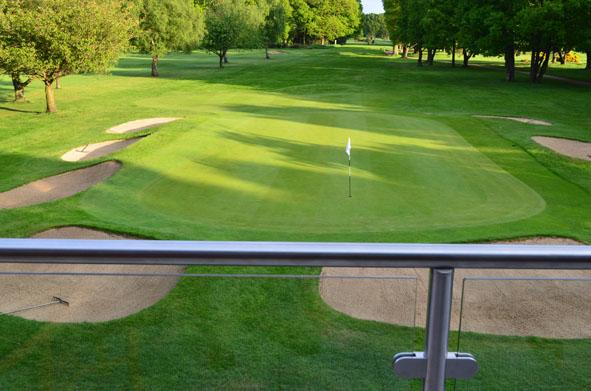
- The 18th hole at Harpenden Common Golf Club taken from the first floor balcony of the clubhouse.

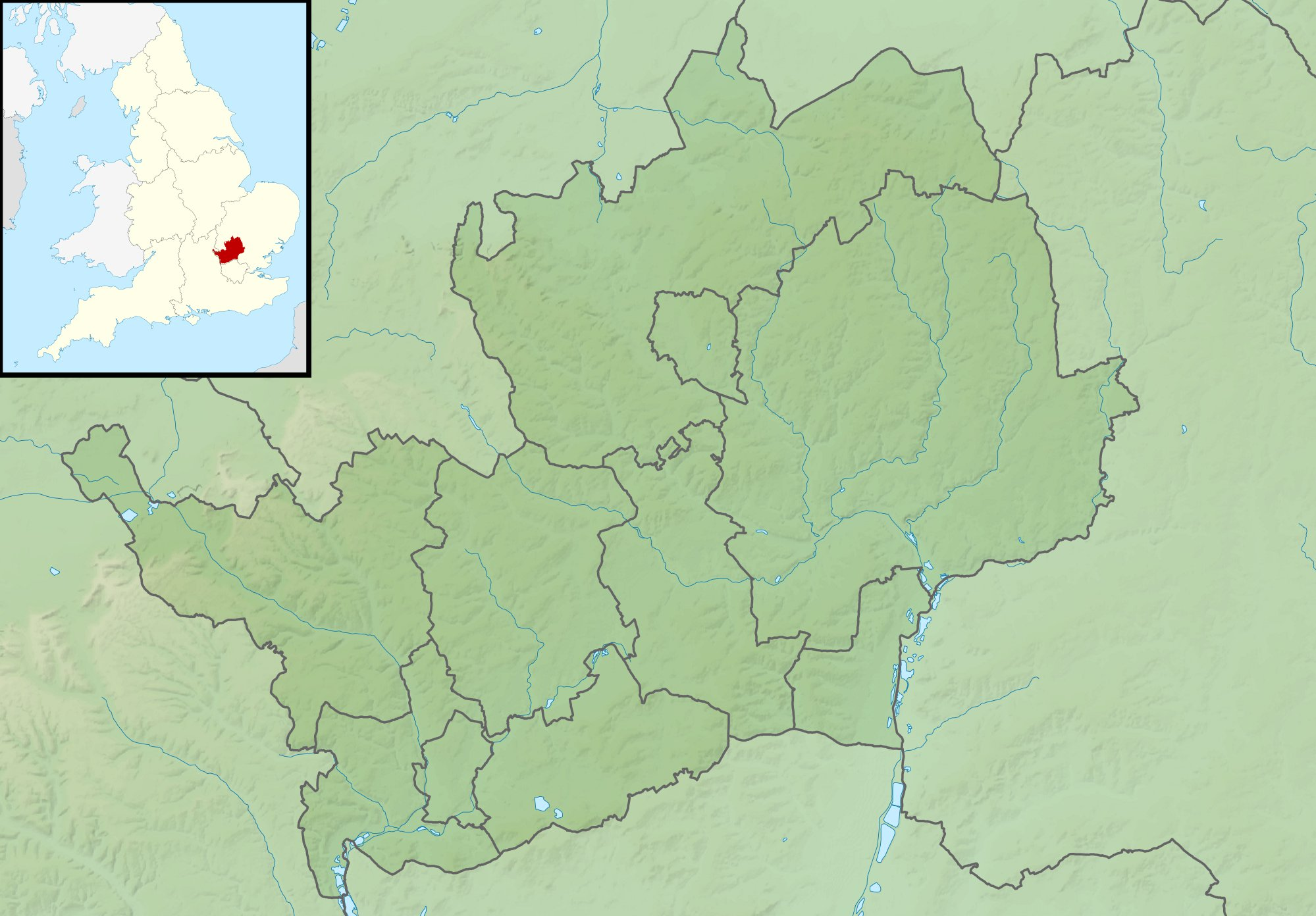
- Harpenden Common Golf Club in Hertfordshire Location in England
- 51.802°N 0.349°W

Club information
- Location: Harpenden, Hertfordshire, England
- Established: 1931 (Course: 1895)
- Type: Private
- Tota holes: 18
- Website: harpendencommongolfclub.co.uk
- Designed by: Unknown / Ken Brown
- Par: 70
- Length: 6,074 yards (5,554 m)

Harpenden Common Golf Club is a private members' golf club in Harpenden, Hertfordshire.

Although golf has been played on Harpenden Common since 1895, Harpenden Common Golf Club itself was founded in 1931 when Harpenden Golf Club moved to a new course at Hammonds End. The similarities between the two clubs' names has been known to create confusion for visiting golfers but once visitors are redirected to the club on Cravells Road they can expect a warm welcome. After a major revision to the course in 1996, the golf course consists of eleven holes on the original common and seven new holes on private land in an area known as the Jockey Field. Harpenden Common Golf Club is also a part of the Hertfordshire Golf Affiliated Courses Group (HGACG).

== Notable Members ==
The club's most famous member is Ken Brown who joined as a junior member in 1969 and also worked as a green keeper at the club. Ken acknowledged his attachment to the club during his professional playing career. Ken frequently discusses goings on at '"the Common"' during his BBC commentary at major golf tournaments. Ken was recently joined by the mayors of Harpenden and St Albans in May 2013 when he officially opened the newly developed clubhouse.

== The Golf Course ==
The golf course is partly based on Harpenden Common and partly on private land owned by the Club (known as the Jockey Field. The holes in the Jockey Field were added in 1996 and were designed by club member and Ryder Cup player Ken Brown. At the same time some of the holes on the Common were amended and lengthened. Some of the original holes on the Common which are no longer used as part of the course now provide excellent practice facilities for the members of the club and visitors.

The golf course at Harpenden Common Golf Club has a number of interesting or unusual features:

- Holes 1 to 5, 8 to 11, and 17 to 18 are played on Harpenden Common which is public common land.
- The approach shot to the 2nd green is played over a public road called Cross Lane;
- The 3rd fairway includes the cricket square and pitch on which Bamville Cricket Club play cricket on Sunday afternoons between May and September each year. At times when cricket is being played, the 3rd hole is played as a par three hole from past the cricket pitch.
- The 4th and 5th holes are consecutive par threes, a rare occurrence on British golf courses;
- Tee shots on the 8th and 9th holes are played over public roads Cross Lane and Limbrick Road respectively.
- The copse of trees between the 8th green and 9th tee mark the site of the "paddock" which is all that remains of the historical horse races that were held on the Common between the 1830s and 1914.
- The course ends with a par three. This is relatively unusual on golf courses but does enable members on the terraces and balconies of the clubhouse to watch the entire final hole of important matches from their seats.

The Club is private though guests are allowed at most times, subject to course availability; a handicap certificate may be requested in order to establish proficiency.

The golf course has three tees – "Ladies" (red tees), "Visitors" (yellow tees) and "Medal" (white tees).

=== Current Layout ===
Men's card (since 22nd of January 2026)

Hole	Yards - White Tees	Yards - Yellow Tees	Par	Hole	Yards - White Tees	Yards - Yellow Tees	Par
1	321	303	4	10	302	297	4
2	373	367	4	11	375	374	4
3	533	523	5	12	476	456	5
4	189	188	3	13	351	345	4
5	146	135	3	14	365	355	4
6	388	376	4	15	408	380	4
7	294	266	4	16	174	148	3
8	458	400	4	17	382	378	4
9	387	381	4	18	152	147	3
Out	3,089	2,939	35	In	2,985	2,880	35
				Total	6,074	5,819	70

The current course record is held by Tony Wilkins who scored a 62, -8 to par.

Ladies' card (since 1996)

Hole	Yards - Red Tees	Par	Hole	Yards - Red Tees	Par
1	313	4	10	297	4
2	360	4	11	363	4
3	495	5	12	412	5
4	171	3	13	296	4
5	130	3	14	336	4
6	342	4	15	340	4
7	234	4	16	129	3
8	403	5	17	362	4
9	386	4	18	141	3
Out	2,834	36	In	2,676	35
			Total	5,510	71

== Hertfordshire County Honours ==
Harpenden Common Golf Club has frequently produced good amateur players who have performed well at the County level.

Year	Competition	Member
YTD	Junior County Team Members	J.McCann J.Wilkins
YTD	County Team Members	T.Wilkins, L.Owen, M.Roche
2025	Herts County Championship - Winner	L.Owen
2025	Knebworth Bowl	T.Turner, T.Wilkins, L.Owen
2024	BIGGA tournament	L.Owen
2017	Herts County Championship - winner	T.Wilkins
2013	Herts Champion Club - Winner	S Claridge, P Wilkins, T Wilkins
2012	Herts Open Championship - Winner	Lewis Watcham
2012	Herts Scratch League Division 1 - Winner	Scratch Team
2011	Herts Inter Club Foursome Championship - Winner	Paul Wilkins, Lewis Watcham
2008	Herts Men's Order of Merit - Winner	Sam Claridge
2008	Herts Boys Team Championship - Winner	S Claridge, T Brown, M Fox
2008	Herts Inter Club Foursome Championship - Winner	Sam Claridge, Tom Brown
2004	Herts County Championship - Winner	Rob Leonard
2004	Herts Colts Championship - Winner	Rob Leonard
2004	Herts Champion Club - Winner	R Leonard, S Mulkerrin, T Wilkins
2003	Herts Scratch League Division 1 - Winner	Scratch Team
2002	Herts Colts Championship - Winner	Rob Leonard
2000	Herts County Championship - Winner	Ian Farrant
2000	Herts Scratch League Division 1 - Winner	Scratch Team
2008	Herts Inter Club Foursome Championship - Winner	Ian Farrant, Ben Connelly
2006	Herts Seniors Championship - Winner	Roger Dew
1996	Herts Boys Championship - Winner	Craig Arnott
1996	Herts Boys Team Championship - Winner	B Armstrong, T Turner, A Turner
1996	Malcolm Reid Trophies - Winner	Craig Arnott
1995	Herts Colts Championship - Winner	Michael Mulkerrin
1994	Herts Salver - Winner	Ian Farrant
1991	Herts County Championship - Winner	Mark Peate
1991	Herts Salver - Winner	Richard Dew
1990	Herts Salver - Winner	Reg Coates
1973	Herts Boys Championship - Winner	Ken Brown
1952	Herts County Championship - Winner	E.R. ′Dickie′ Anscombe
