= Lydekker Park =

Park in Harpenden, Hertfordshire, England

Coordinates: 51.8196°N 0.3578°W

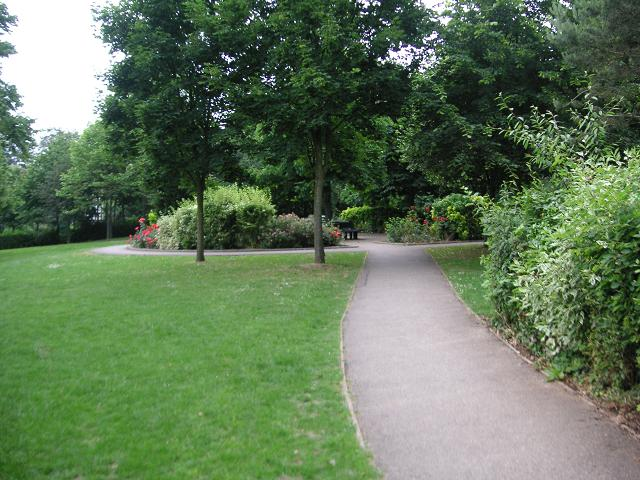
Lydekker Park, Harpenden

Lydekker Park is a 3-acre (1.2 ha) park in Harpenden, Hertfordshire. The land was formerly part of the garden of Harpenden Lodge, built in 1803, home for many years to the Lydekkers, one of the town's oldest families. In 1937 Hilda Lydekker, last surviving member of the Lydekker family, entered into an agreement with the former Harpenden Urban District Council that the 11 acres (4.5 ha) of land attached to Harpenden lodge should become an open space for the people of Harpenden. Her intention was that the open space should be a memorial to her two brothers and her fiancé, all of whom died in World War I.

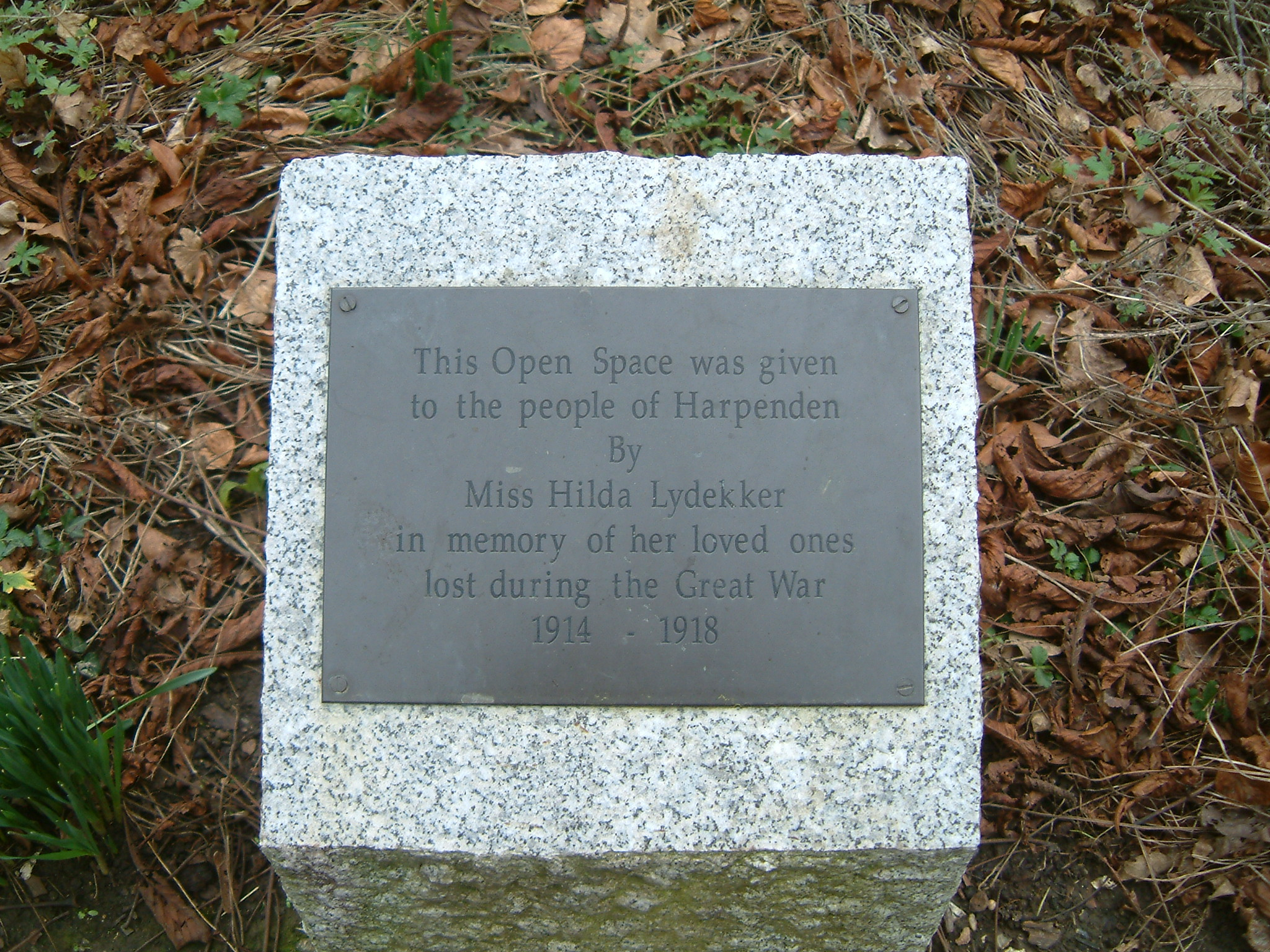
Memorial Plaque, Lydekker Park, Harpenden

However, following the death of Miss Lydekker in 1987, shortly before her 101st birthday, her relatives were able to overturn the terms of her will, and the land was subsequently sold for development. Harpenden Town Council made strenuous efforts to have all, or at least part of, the area retained as open space. The Town Council had some measure of control as the developers were depending upon the Town Council to obtain planning permission to develop the site.

In the end, only 3 acres (1.2 ha) out of the original 11 were given over to parkland and adjoining carpark, which is leased to the Harpenden Town Council at peppercorn rent. The park was opened to the public on 1 July 1998.
