= John Bennet Lawes =

English entrepreneur and scientist (1814–1900)

Sir John Bennet Lawes, Bt
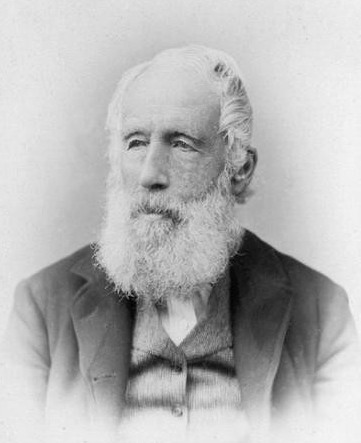
- Born: 28 December 1814; Harpenden, Hertfordshire, England
- Died: 31 August 1900 (aged 85)
- Awards: Albert Medal (1893)

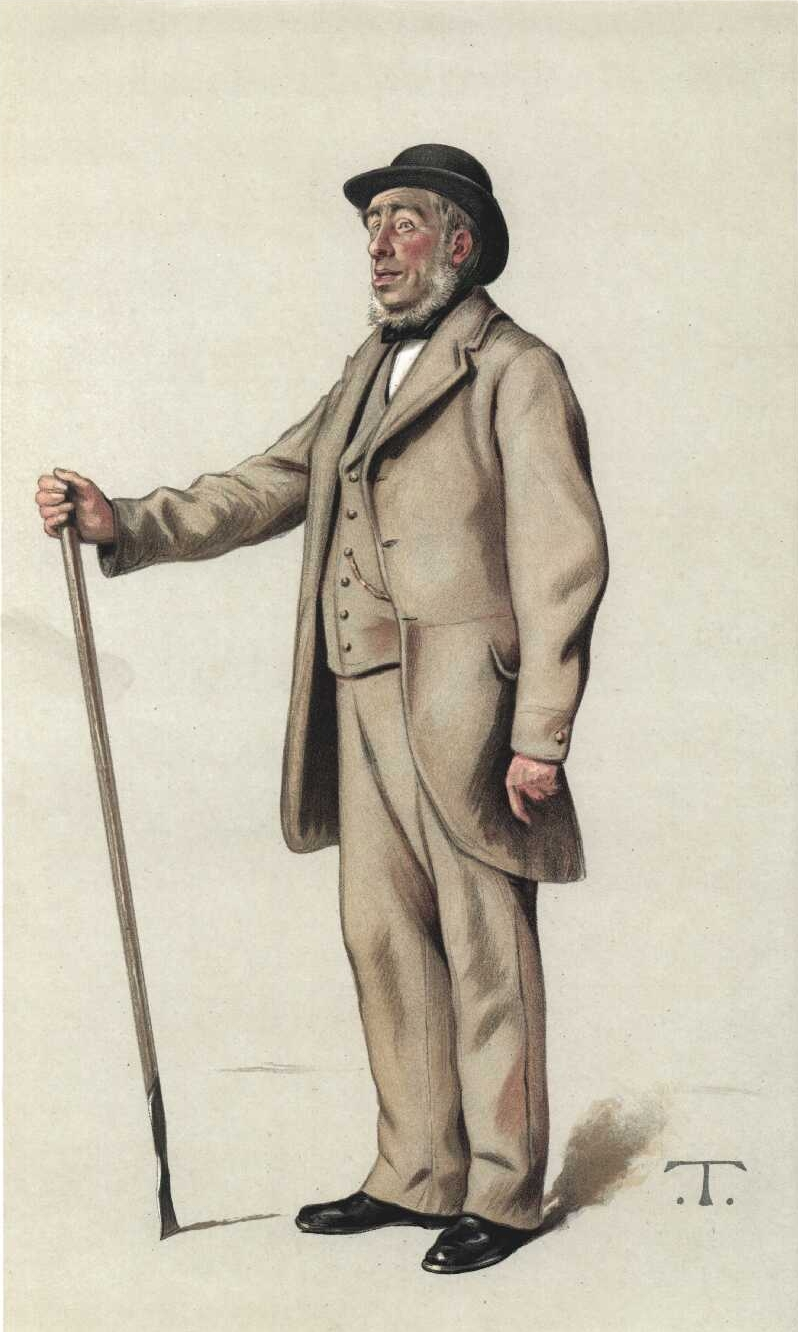
Lawes as caricatured by Spy (Leslie Ward) in Vanity Fair, July 1882

Sir John Bennet Lawes, 1st Baronet, FRS (28 December 1814 – 31 August 1900) was an English entrepreneur and agricultural scientist. He founded an experimental farm at his home at Rothamsted Manor that eventually became Rothamsted Research, where he developed a superphosphate that would mark the beginnings of the chemical fertilizer industry.

== Life ==
John Bennet Lawes was born at Rothamsted, Harpenden, Hertfordshire, on 28 December 1814, the only son of John Bennet Lawes, owner of the PP estate and lord of the manor of Rothamsted. His father died when he was eight years old, so he was brought up mostly by his mother Marianne. He was educated at Eton College and Brasenose College, Oxford, although he didn't graduate. In 1822, his father died and Lawes inherited Rothamsted.

Before leaving Oxford in 1832, Lawes had begun to interest himself in growing various medicinal plants on the Estates and started to experiment on the effects of various manures on plants growing in pots. A year or two later the experiments were extended to crops in the field in order to free farmers from relying on animals to produce fertilizer. In 1839, an ostrich belonging to him escaped Rothamsted and caused a bit of property damage, although the only person it hurt was the first one to try and capture it.

In 1842, he patented a manure formed by treating phosphates with sulphuric acid, and thus initiated the artificial manure industry. In the succeeding year he enlisted the services of Joseph Henry Gilbert, with whom he experimented for more than half a century in raising crops and feeding animals, activities which have rendered Rothamsted famous to scientific agriculturists. In 1854, he was elected a Fellow of the Royal Society, which in 1867 bestowed a Royal Medal on Lawes and Gilbert jointly, and in 1882 he was awarded the title of baronet. He was elected as a member to the American Philosophical Society in 1883.

Lawes died on 31 August 1900 and Rothamsted Manor and Estates passed to his son Charles. He was buried in the churchyard of St Nicholas Church, Harpenden with his wife Caroline (née Fountaine), who predeceased him (1822- 29 November 1895). They had two children, Caroline Lawes & Charles Bennet Lawes (3 October 1843 - 6 October 1911) Charles married Maria Amelia Rose Fountaine (related?) on 8 April 1869 at St George's Church, Hanover Square, London. He became Sir Charles Bennet Lawes-Wittewronge 2nd Bt on the death of his father in 1900 (the name Witteronge was his grandmother's maiden name)

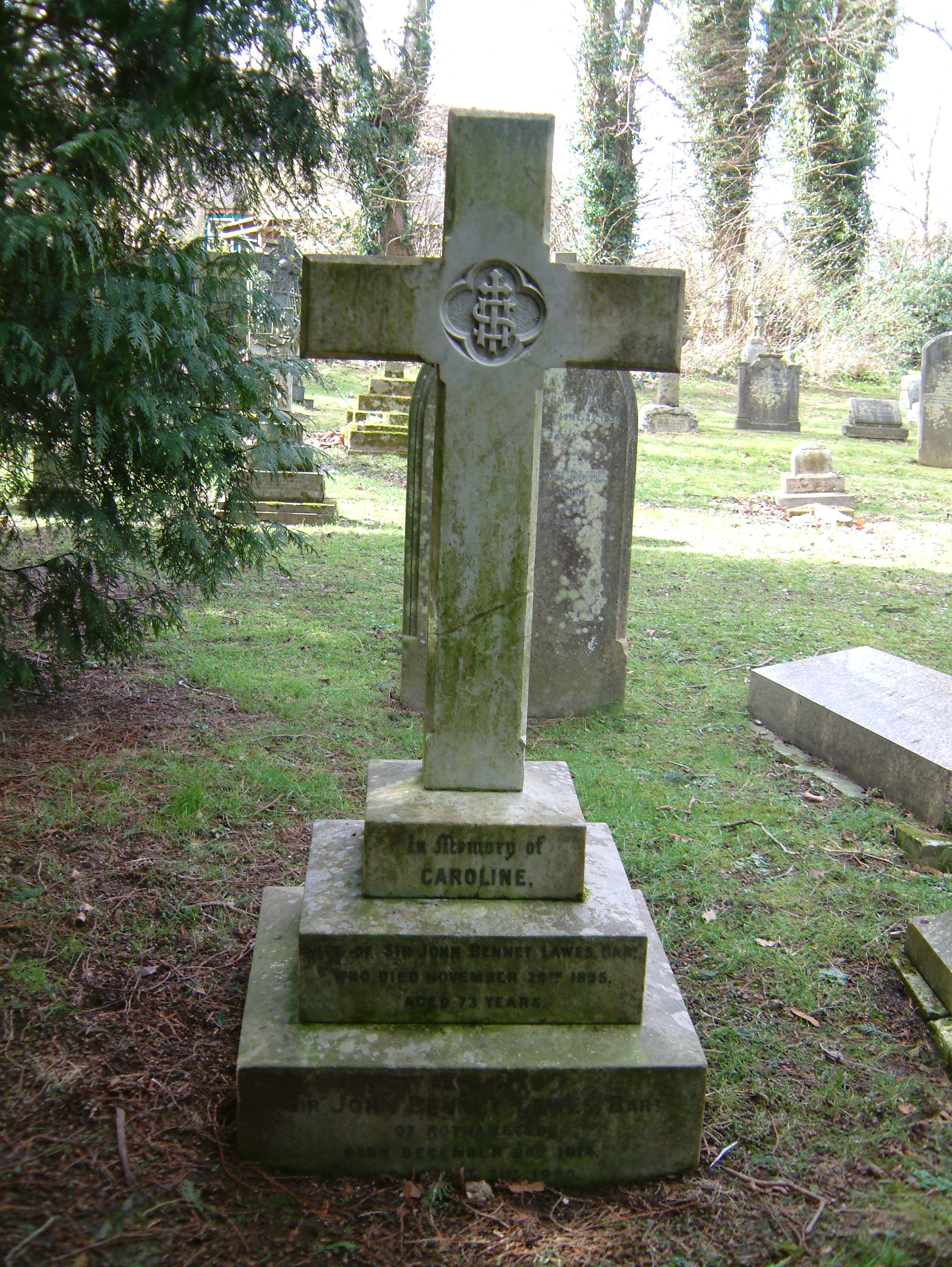
Headstone of Sir John Bennet Lawes (1814-1900) and his wife Caroline (née Fountaine) Lawes (1822-1895)

== Legacy ==
In 1889, Lawes took measures to ensure the continued existence of the Rothamsted experimental farm by setting aside money solely for that purpose and so established The Lawes Agricultural Trust. Rothamsted Experimental Station is the oldest agricultural research facility in the world.

Sir John Lawes School in Harpenden, Herts is named after him.

The locality of Lawes, Queensland, in Australia is named after him. The main feature of that locality is the University of Queensland Gatton Campus which specialises in agriculture.

Baronetage of the United Kingdom
New creation	Baronet (of Rothamsted); 1882–1899	Succeeded by Charles Lawes-Wittewronge
