= Rothamsted Manor =

Coordinates: 51.8059°N 0.3693°W

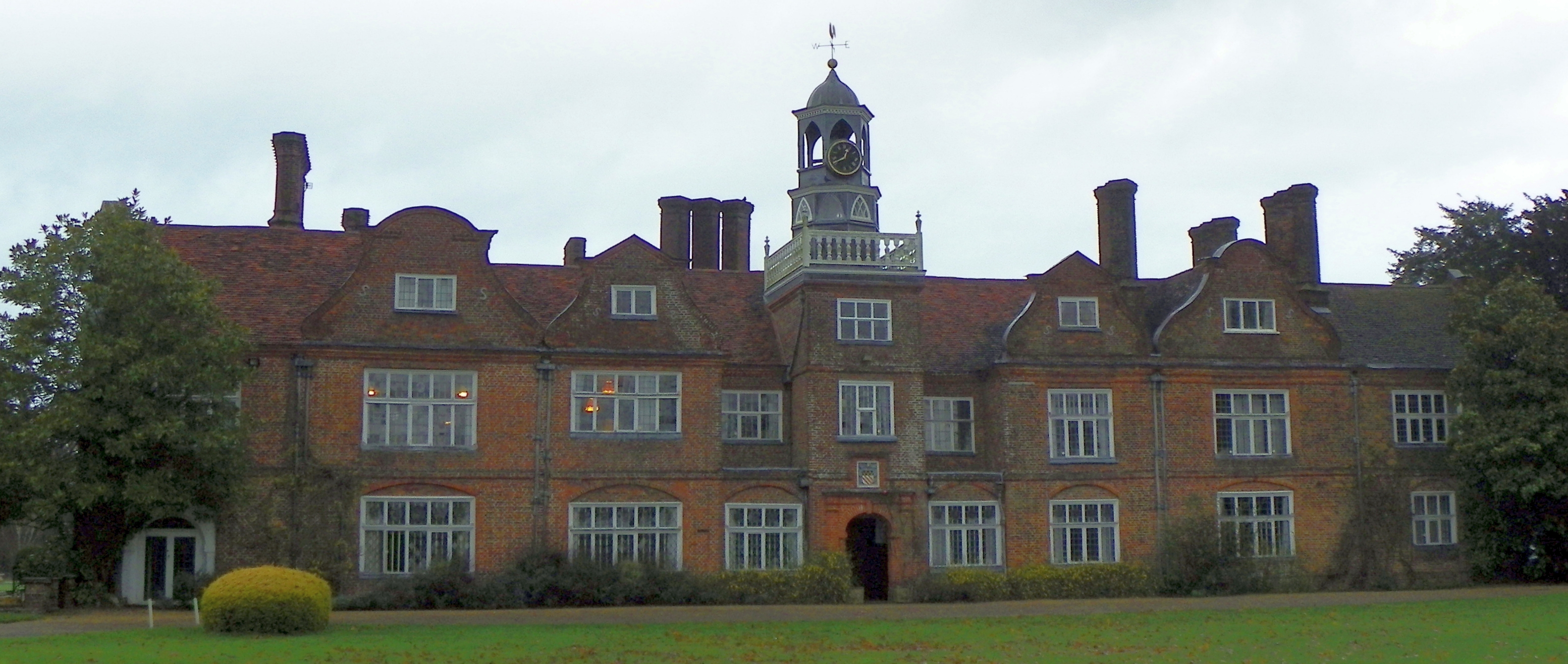
- The manor house

- Location of Rothamsted Manor in Hertfordshire

General information
- Location: Harpenden Rural, England
- Construction started: 17th century

Rothamsted Manor is a former manor and current manor house, situated in Harpenden Rural in the English county of Hertfordshire. A Grade I listed building, dating in part from the 17th century, it is now an events venue, while the surrounding estate is home to the Rothamsted Research Centre.

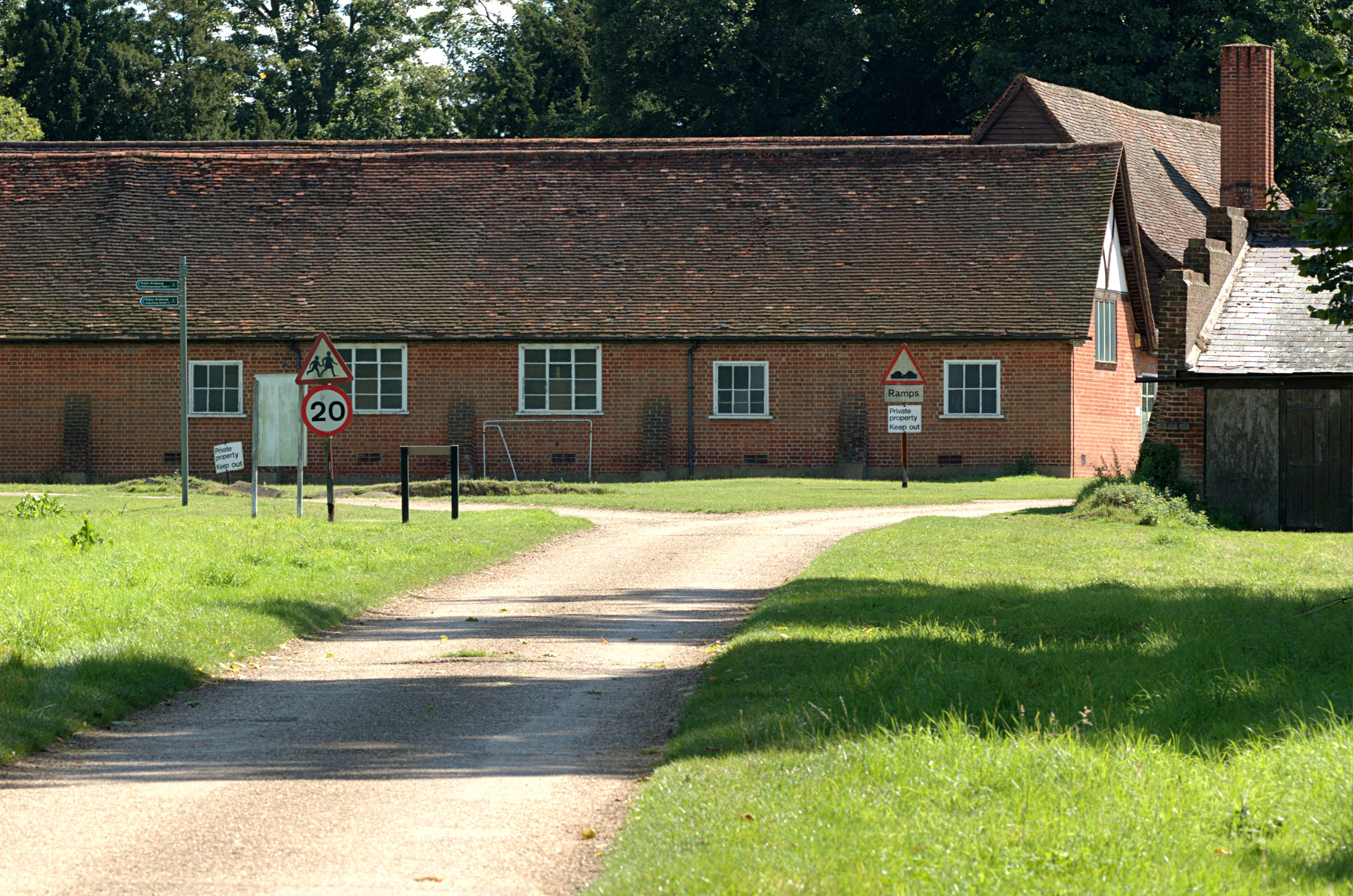
Buildings near the manor house

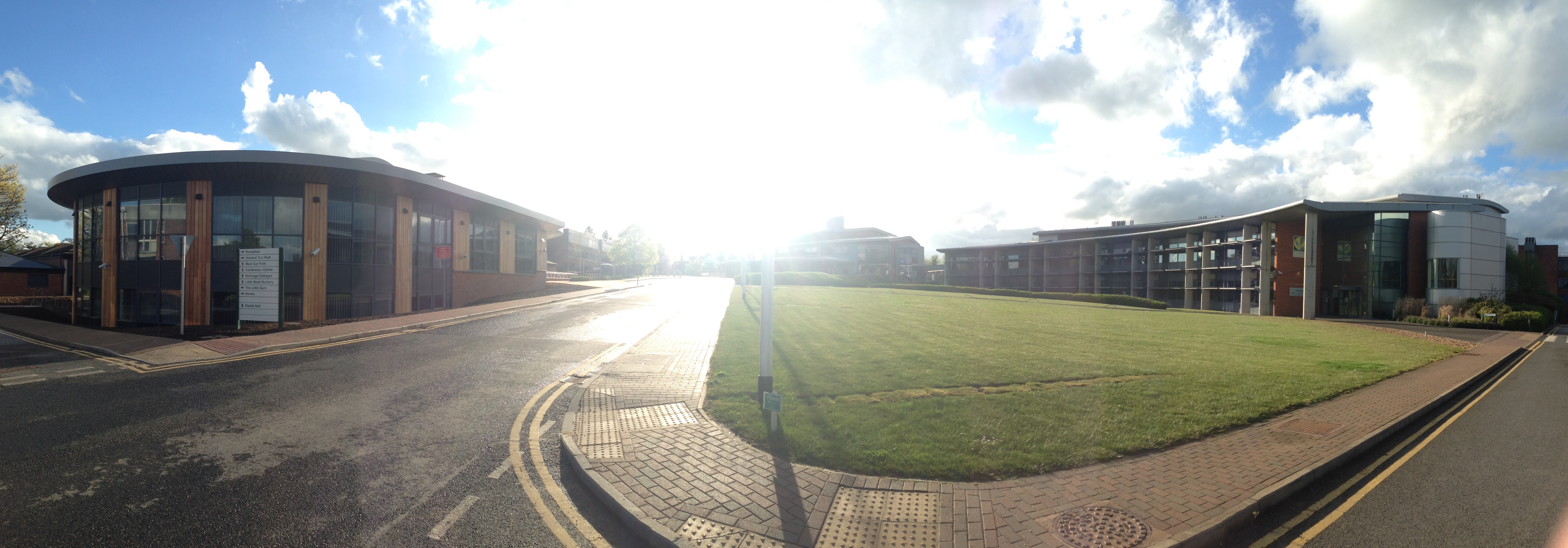
Panorama of Rothamsted Research, Rothamsted Manor

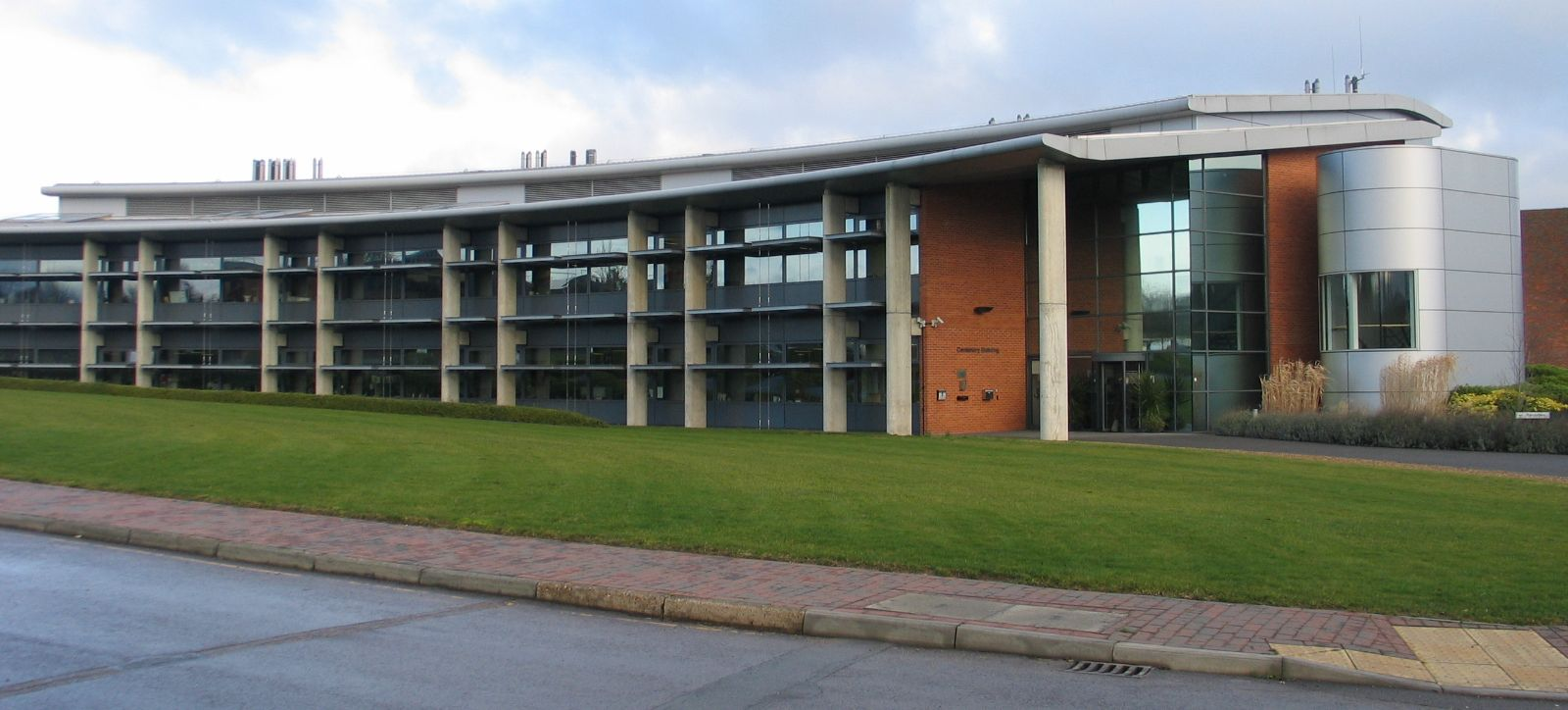
The Centenary building at Rothamsted Research, Rothamsted Manor, finished in 2003

== History ==
The first recorded mention of Rothamsted is in 1212, when Richard de Merston owned lands there. In 1221, a house with a chapel and garden are referred to in a land grant. By 1292 Rothamsted had passed to the Nowell family, passing to the Cresseys by 1355, and to the Bardolphs by 1525. By this time there was a substantial manor house, with at least 16 rooms.

In 1623 Edmund Bardolph sold Rothamsted to Anne Wittewronge. The Wittewronges were Calvinists who had fled religious persecution in Ghent in 1564, and had founded a brewery in London. In the 17th century, Sir John Wittewronge, Anne's son, gave the house its Dutch style. The manor remained with the Wittewronge family until 1763, when Thomas Wittewronge died and the manor passed to his cousin John Bennet. He in turn left the manor to John Bennet Lawes, the son of his sister.

In 1843, Sir John Bennet Lawes, the son of the earlier John Bennet Lawes, founded the Rothamsted Experimental Station, an agricultural research station, on the grounds of the manor. In 1931, his descendants decided to sell the estate, and after a successful public appeal, the Experimental Station was able to finance the purchase of the estate in 1934.

In 1938 the Harpenden Urban District Council purchased the portion of the estate now known as Rothamsted Park from the Experimental Station, in order to provide playing fields and to preserve an important open space. The remainder of the estate is still used by Rothamsted Research, as the Rothamsted Experimental Station is now known. The manor house used to serve as accommodation for staff, but now functions predominantly as a function venue.

The New Zealand architect Frederick Strouts used Rothamsted Manor as his inspiration for the design of Ivey Hall, which was built between 1878 and 1880 and is now the main building of Lincoln University.
