= Robert Warington (agricultural chemist, born 1838) =

English agricultural chemist

Robert Warington, Jr.
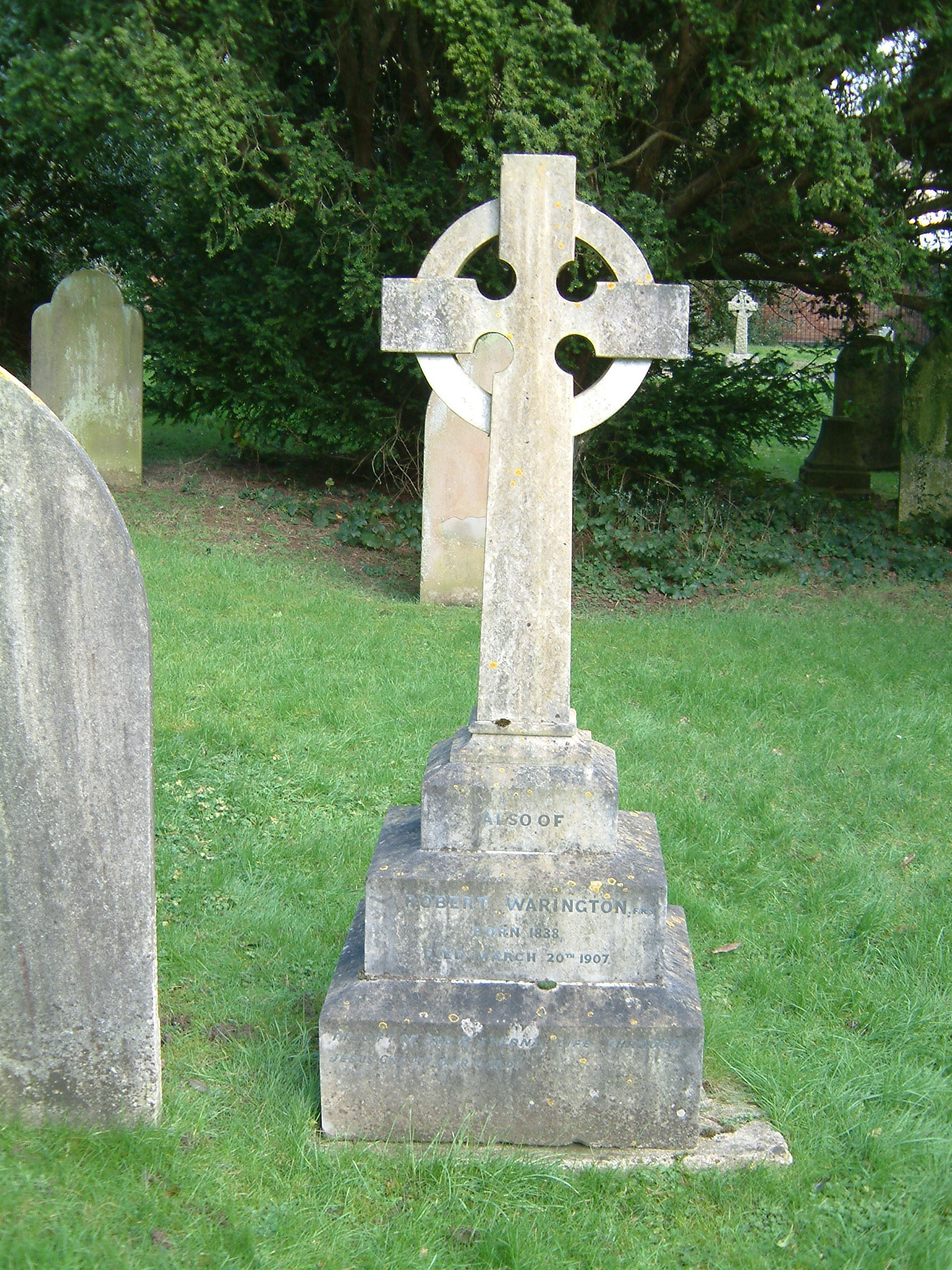
- Warington Family Plot, St Nicholas Churchyard
- Born: 22 August 1838; Spitalfields, London, England
- Died: 20 March 1907 (aged 68); Harpenden, Hertfordshire, England
- Spouses: Helen Louisa Makins (m. 1884; died 1898) Rosa Jane Spackman (m. 1902; died 1907)
- Children: 5, including Katherine
- Father: Robert Warington

Robert Warington, Jr. FCS FRS (22 August 1838, Spitalfields, London – 20 March 1907, Harpenden) was an English agricultural chemist, known for his research and publications on the chemistry of phosphates and nitrates in agricultural soils.

== Biography ==
Robert Warington Jr. was the eldest son and second child of the chemist Robert Warington, FRS. After studying chemistry in his father's laboratory and attending lectures by Faraday, Brande, and Hofmann, Robert Warington Jr. became in 1859 an unpaid assistant to Sir John Bennet Lawes at Rothamsted Experimental Station at Harpenden. Warington was from 1862 to 1867 an assistant to the Professor of Chemistry at the Royal Agricultural College at Cirencester.

Leaving Cirencester in June 1867, Warington was given by Lawes the post of chemist to his manure and tartaric and citric acid works at Barking and Millwall. His engagement terminated in 1874, but he remained in the Millwall laboratory for two years longer, working on citric and tartaric acids, and ultimately publishing his results in a paper of 70 pages in the 'Journal of the Chemical Society' (1875). In 1876 he returned to Rothamsted, under an agreement for one year only, to work simply as Lawes's private assistant. Before settling at Harpenden, he made in the autumn of 1876 a short tour of the German experimental stations.

He was from 1876 to 1891 an investigator at Rothamsted Experimental Stations, where he published many articles on soil nitrification. R. Warington here made the first observation that nitrification is a two-step process in 1879.

In 1891 Warington was appointed by the committee for the Lawes Agricultural Trust to give six lecture in the United States before the Association of American Agricultural Colleges and Experimental Stations at Washington, D.C. from August 12 to 18, 1891. The lectures dealt mainly with the subject of soil nitrification, based upon his own research at Rothamsted. When he returned to England, he did research at Lawes's Millwall laboratory. He was appointed in 1894 as an examiner in agriculture for the science and art department of the University of Oxford and was for three years, from 1894 to 1897, the Sibthorpian professor of rural economy at the University of Oxford.

He was elected in 1863 a Fellow of the Chemical Society and in 1886 a Fellow of the Royal Society.

== Personal life ==
In 1884 Robert Warrington Jr. married Helen Louisa (1855–1898), third daughter of George H. Makins, M.R.C.S., chief assayer to the Bank of England. Robert Warington Jr. and his first wife had five daughters: Elizabeth (Betty) born in 1888; Margaret born in 1890; Dorothy, born in 1892; and twins, Katherine and Helen (Kitty and Nell) born in 1897. In 1902 he married Rosa Jane, daughter of Frederick Robert Spackman, M.D., of Harpenden. Katherine Warington (1897–1993) became a famous botanist. Robert Warington Jr is buried with many of his family in a family plot in St Nicholas Churchyard, Harpenden, England.

== Selected publications ==
- Warrington R. (1896). Agricultural science: its place in a university education. London: H. Frowde.
- —— (1900). Lectures on some of the physical properties of soil. Oxford at the Clarendon Press.
- —— (1906) [1881]. Chemistry of the Farm (4th revision). Morton's handbook of the farm; no. 1 (19th ed.). London: Vinton.
