= Atlas (crater) =

Lunar impact crater

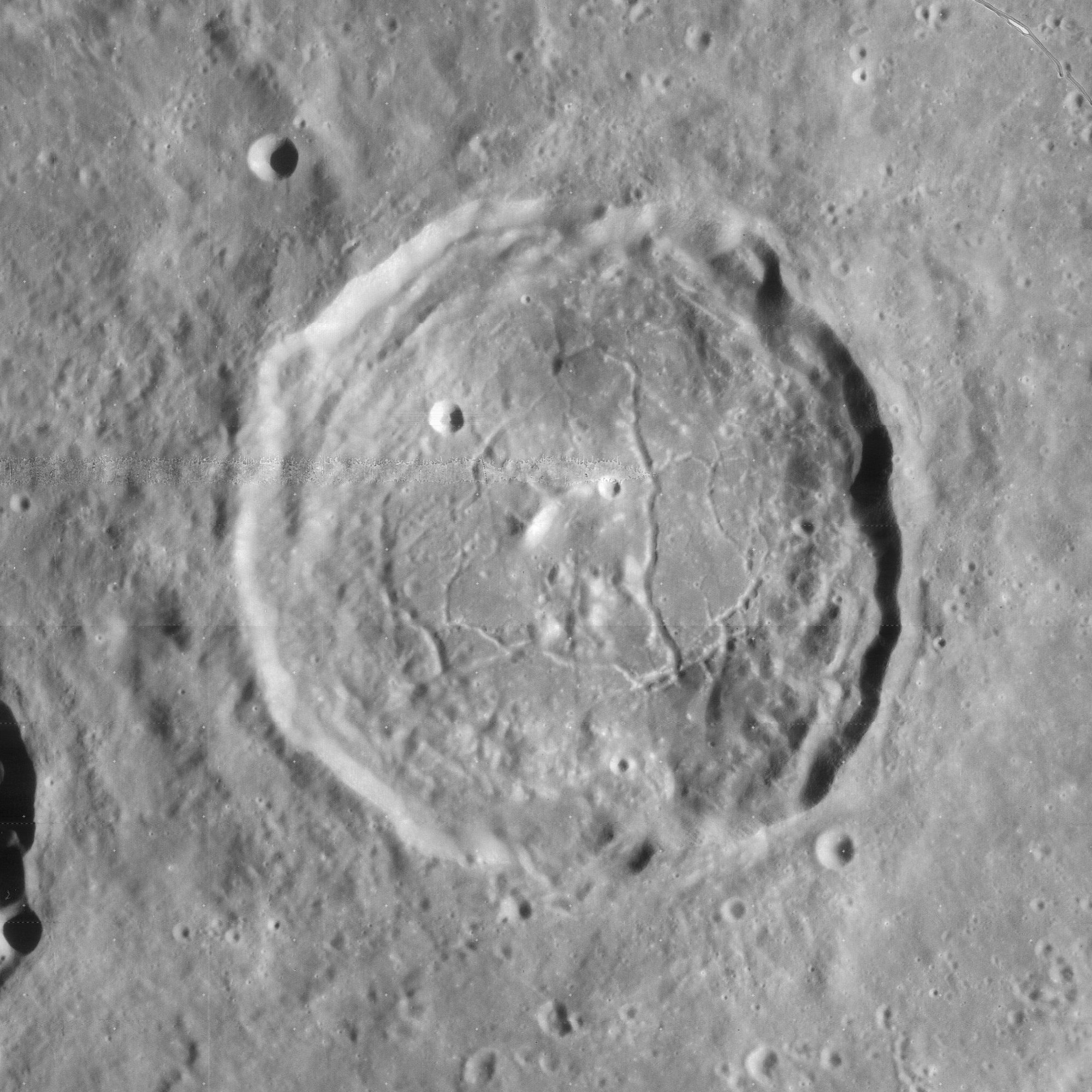
- Mosaic of Lunar Orbiter 4 images
- Coordinates: 46.7°N 44.4°E
- Diameter: 88.12 km (54.76 mi)
- Depth: 2.0 km
- Colongitude: 316° at sunrise
- Formation: Upper Imbrian
- Eponym: Atlas

Atlas is a prominent lunar impact crater that is located in the northeast part of the Moon, to the southeast of Mare Frigoris. T. W. Webb described it as "a superb amphitheatre" with "its ring rich in terraces and towers". Just to the west is the slightly smaller but still prominent crater Hercules, and the pair make a notable sight for a telescopic observer. Northeast of Atlas is the large crater Endymion.

This crater is named after the mythological Greek Titan, Atlas. Its designation was formally adopted by the IAU in 1935. The name was included in the lunar nomenclature of the Italian selenographer Giovanni Riccioli in 1651.

== Description ==
On the lunar geologic timescale, Atlas is a crater of Upper (Late) Imbrian age. The inner wall of Atlas is multiply terraced and the edge slumped, forming a sharp-edged lip. Its southwest quadrangle is characterised by an extremely high rockfall density by lunar standards. This is a floor-fractured crater with a rough and hilly interior that has a lighter albedo than the surroundings. Floor-fractures are usually created as a result of volcanic modifications.

There are two dark patches along the inner edge of the walls; one along the north edge and another besides the southeast edges. These are pyroclastic deposits likely made by explosive volcanic eruptions. Spectra of these deposits show "feldspar-bearing mafic mineral assemblages dominated by orthopyroxene". A lighter hued ray from the 440 km distant crater Thales passes between these dark areas. The infrared spectrum of pure crystalline plagioclase has been identified on the northeast floor, and the north, northeast and southeast walls.

A system of slender clefts named the Rimae Atlas crosses the crater floor, and were created by volcanism. Along the north and northeastern inner sides are a handful of dark-halo craters, most likely due to eruptions. Around the midpoint is a complex of low central hills arranged in a circular formation. These peaks differ significantly from typical lunar crust, showing an enrichment in mafic compounds. This likely results from the crater floor evolution due to magmatic influences. The spectra of the central peak fits an anorthositic gabbro mineralogy, which originated from a depth of 8.7 to 13.8 km.

== Bright raycrater east of Atlas ==
A noteworthy eye-catcher, to observe from waxing crescent moon to full moon, is the officially unnamed bright raycrater east of Atlas and north of satellite crater Atlas A. Its brightness is also noticeable on the photographic version of chart LAC 27 (page 54) in The Clementine Atlas of the Moon (Ben Bussey / Paul D. Spudis).

== Exploration ==
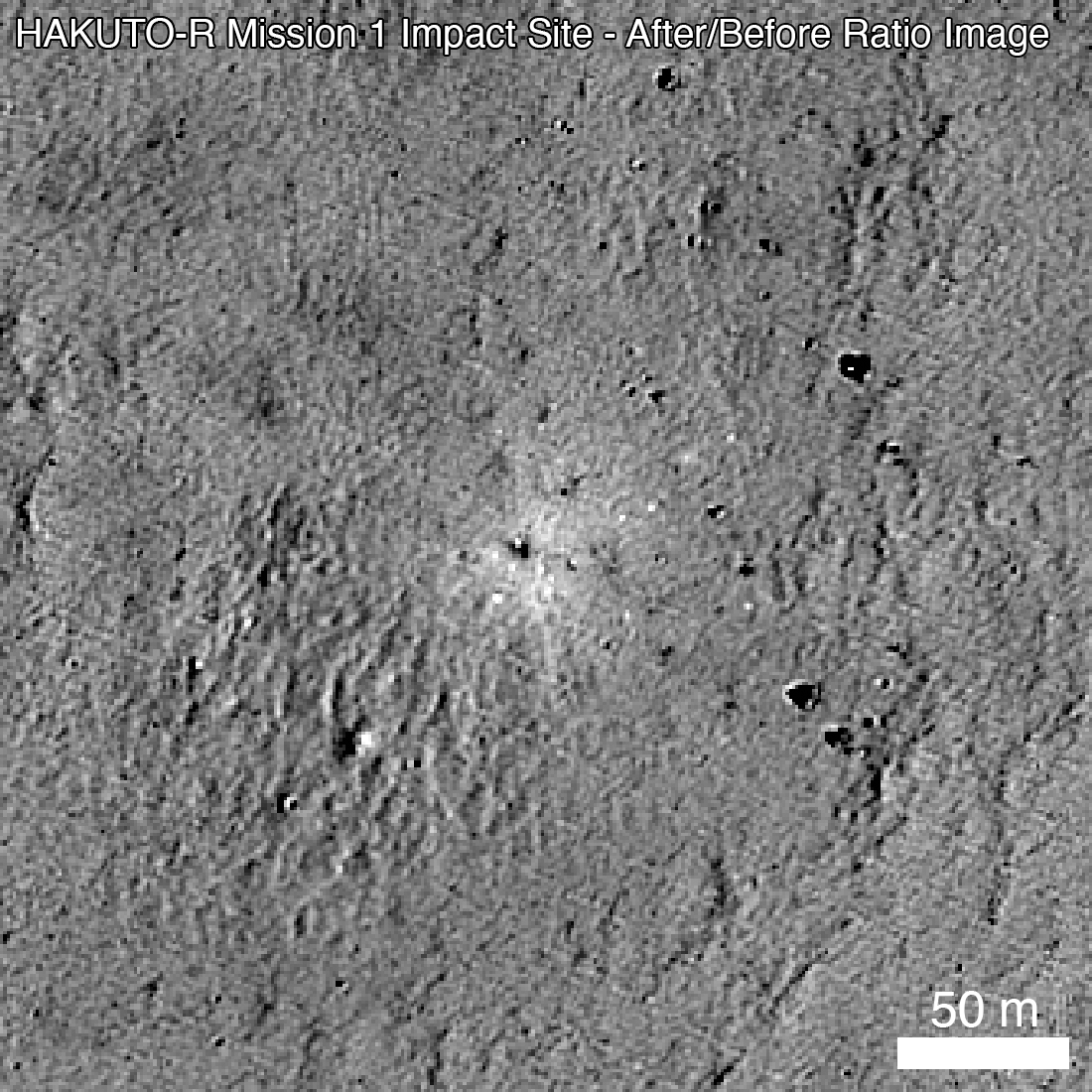
Ejecta field around Hakuto-R Mission 1 impact site

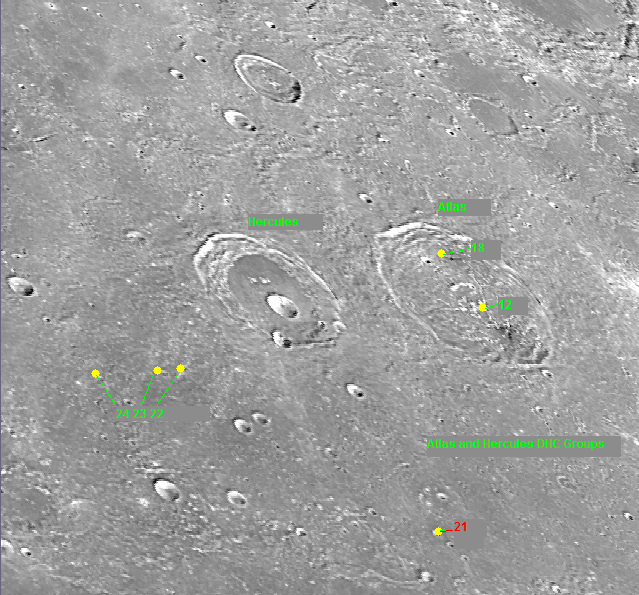
Atlas (center right) and Hercules (center left) Lunar craters

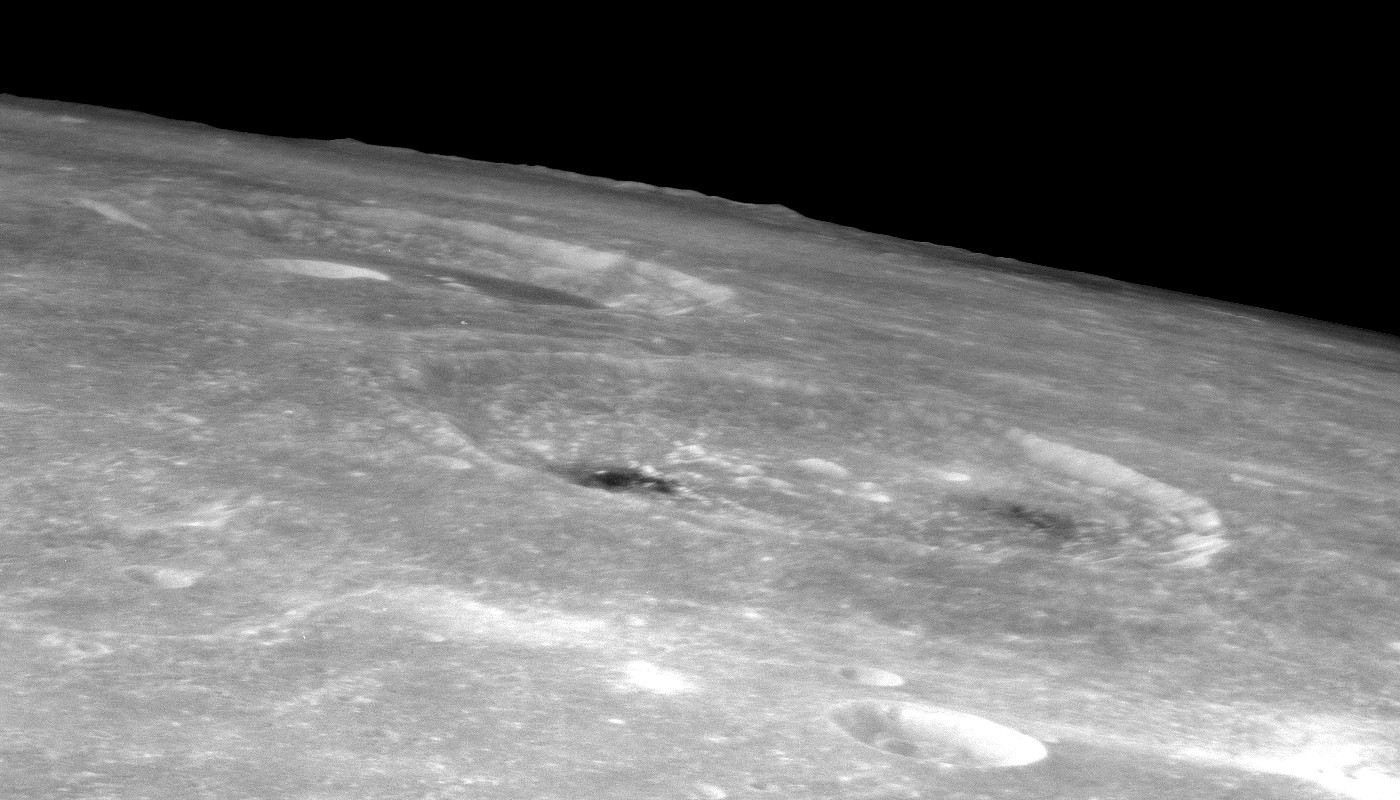
Oblique view of Atlas and Hercules from Apollo 16

The Atlas crater was the primary landing site of the Hakuto-R Mission 1 by ispace, that launched on December 11, 2022. separating from the rocket 47 minutes later at a distance around 970 kilometres (600 mi) away from Earth. If it had been successful, this mission would have been the first private landing on the lunar surface, and would have been the first Japanese probe to land on the Moon.

Communication with Hakuto-R Mission 1 was lost during the final moments of descent to the lunar surface at 16:40 UTC (00:40 JST) on 25 April 2023. The iSpace team confirmed that the $90 million dollar spacecraft had most likely crashed during its landing on the Moon. Analysis determined that the lander plummeted uncontrollably when the propellant was exhausted. This happened because the onboard computer wrongly assumed the radar altimeter was faulty, and ignoring its data, misjudged the actual altitude of the spacecraft and kept hovering 5 kilometers above the surface of the Moon.

== Satellite craters ==
By convention these features are identified on lunar maps by placing the letter on the side of the crater midpoint that is closest to Atlas.

| Atlas | Latitude | Longitude | Diameter |
|---|---|---|---|
| A | 45.3° N | 49.6° E | 22 km |
| D | 50.4° N | 49.6° E | 25 km |
| E | 48.6° N | 42.5° E | 58 km |
| G | 50.7° N | 46.5° E | 23 km |
| L | 51.3° N | 48.6° E | 6 km |
| P | 49.6° N | 52.7° E | 27 km |
| W | 44.4° N | 44.2° E | 4 km |
| X | 45.1° N | 45.0° E | 5 km |
