= De La Rue (crater) =

Crater on the Moon

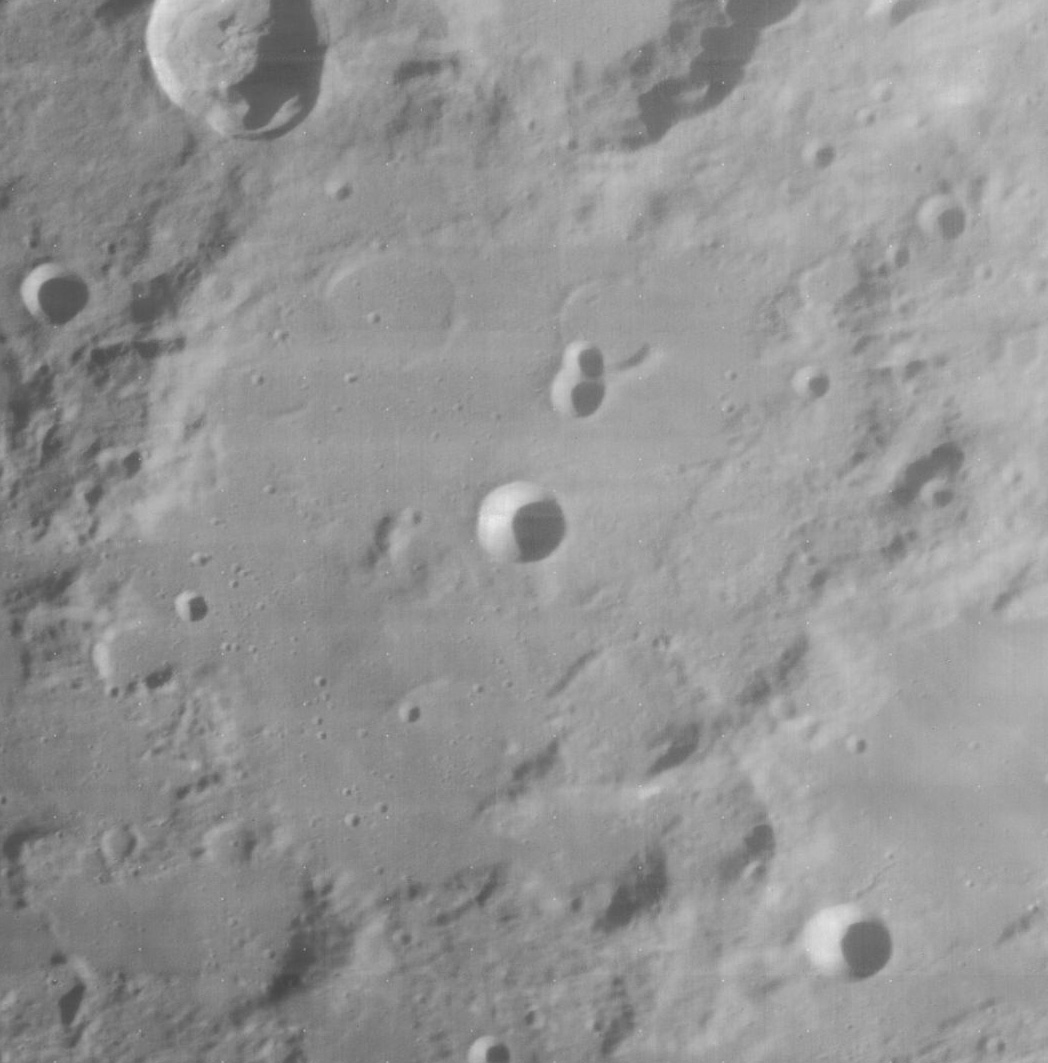
- Lunar Orbiter 4 image
- Coordinates: 59.1°N 53.0°E
- Diameter: 135.22 km (84.02 mi)
- Depth: Unknown
- Colongitude: 310° at sunrise
- Eponym: Warren De la Rue

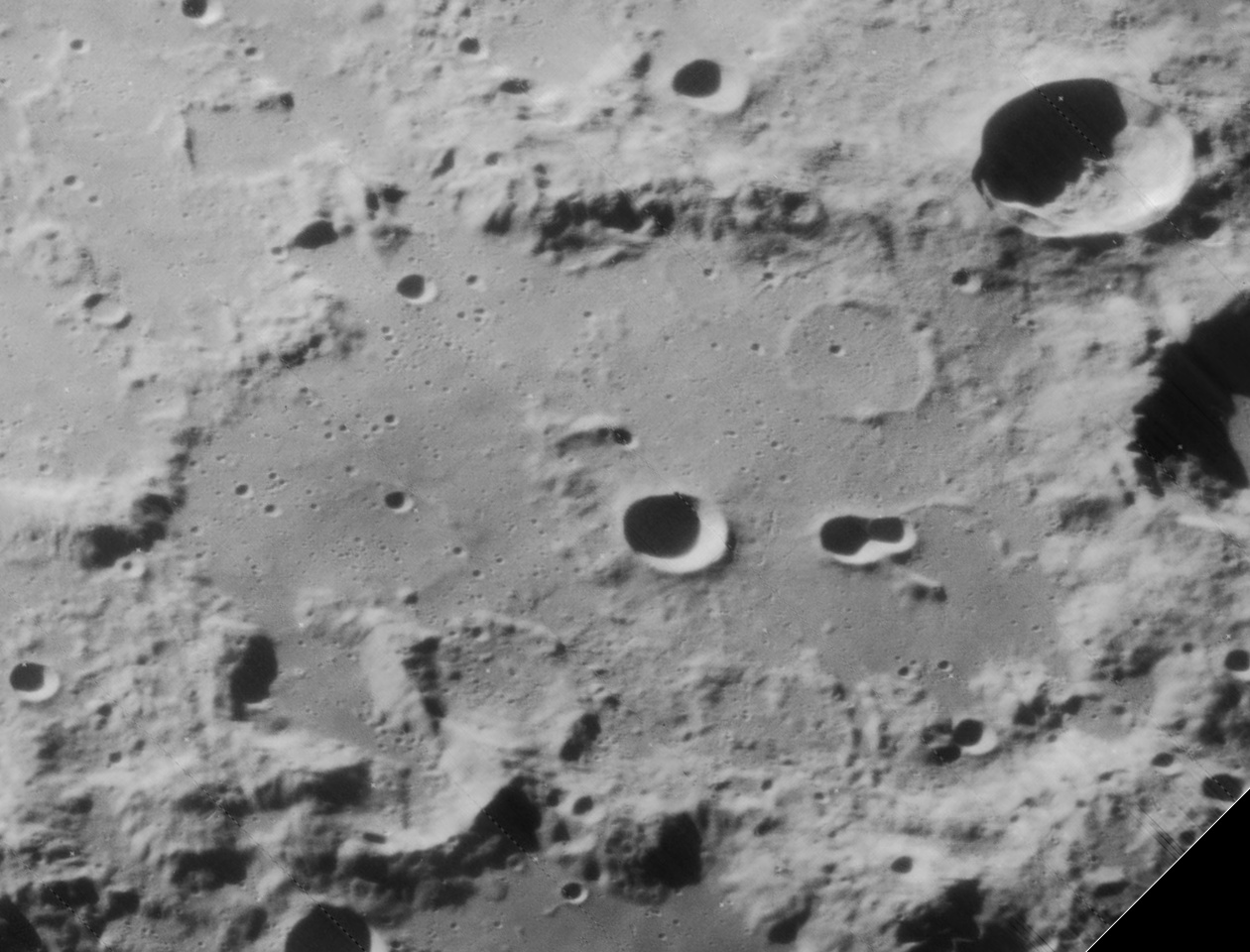
Oblique view from Lunar Orbiter 4

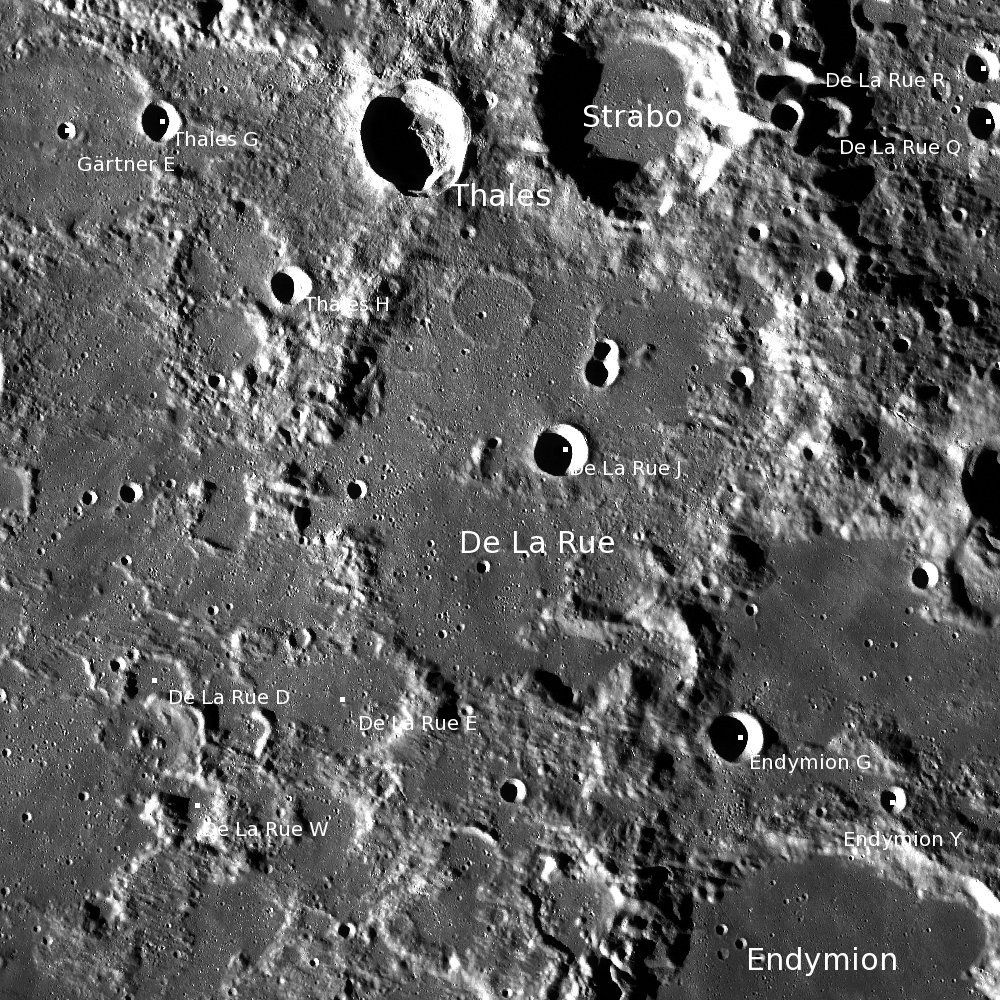
Satellite features and neighboring craters

De La Rue is the remnant of a lunar impact crater, or probably several merged craters, creating a formation sometimes called a walled plain. It lies in the northeastern part of the Moon on the near side, and so appears foreshortened due to its location. This formation lies to the north-northwest of the prominent crater Endymion, just beyond the eastern extreme of Mare Frigoris. The crater Strabo intrudes into the northern part of De La Rue's northern rim, and the smaller Thales is attached to the northwestern part of the wall.

The perimeter of De La Rue is a disintegrated mass of hills, irregular ground, and notches from old craters. The rim is generally rounded along the northwest half, while a formation to the southeast intrudes into the crater resulting in a somewhat straightened wall along that flank. The overall result is a somewhat pear-shaped perimeter. There are remnants of small craters along the south-southeast rim, and several ghost-crater rims lie along the interior floor beside the northern inner wall.

Near the midpoint of the relatively flat interior floor is the bowl-shaped satellite crater De La Rue J. There is rough ground attached to the southern rim of this crater, and low hills just to the west. The inner floor is rougher along the southeast side. The remaining floor is marked by many tiny craterlets, with a notable pair in the northeast part of the interior.

This crater is named after the British astronomer Warren De la Rue (1815–1889), who took some of the first photos of the moon. His name was included in the lunar nomenclature of W. William R. Birt and John Lee during the 19th century. Its designation was formally adopted by the International Astronomical Union in 1935.

== Satellite craters ==
By convention these features are identified on lunar maps by placing the letter on the side of the crater midpoint that is closest to De La Rue.

De La Rue	Latitude	Longitude	Diameter
D	56.8° N	46.2° E	17 km
E	56.8° N	49.7° E	32 km
J	59.0° N	52.8° E	14 km
P	60.5° N	61.4° E	10 km
Q	61.5° N	60.5° E	10 km
R	62.1° N	61.1° E	9 km
S	62.9° N	61.6° E	12 km
W	55.7° N	46.9° E	18 km
