= Robert Warington =

English chemist

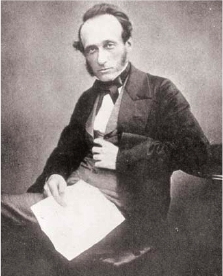
- Robert Warington
- Born: 7 September 1807; Sheerness, Kent, England
- Died: 17 November 1867 (aged 60); Budleigh Salterton, Devon, England
- Education: London University
- Known for: Co-creator of the Chemical Society of London
- Spouse: Elizabeth Jackson (m. 1836; died 1867)
- Children: 4, including Robert
- Relatives: Katherine Warington (granddaughter)

Robert Warington FRS (7 September 1807 – 17 November 1867) was an English chemist considered the driving force behind the creation of the world's first enduring chemistry society, The Chemical Society of London, which later became the Royal Society of Chemistry.

== Life ==
Born on 7 September 1807 in Sheerness, Kent, he was the third son of Thomas Warington (1773–1843), a ship's victualler and wine merchant, and his wife Esther Elizabeth Eaton (1779–1861). One of his uncles was Thomas Warington (1765–1850), the father-in-law of Admiral William Henry Smyth.

After a childhood spent in Portsmouth, Boulogne, and other places, he entered Merchant Taylors' school in 1818 and in 1822 was articled for five years to John Thomas Cooper, a lecturer in the medical schools of Aldersgate Street and Webb Street, and a manufacturer of potassium, sodium, iodine, and other then-rare chemical substances. On the opening of the London University in 1828, later University College, London, he was chosen by Edward Turner, the Professor of Chemistry, as his assistant along with William Gregory. In 1831 he was appointed chemist to the London brewers Truman, Hanbury & Buxton, becoming the first qualified chemist to work for a British brewery. From 1842 (upon Hennell's death) until shortly before his death he was the chemical operator at the Society of Apothecaries.

On 3 August 1836 at Christ Church, Spitalfields he married Elizabeth Jackson (1816–1909), daughter of Dr George Jackson MRCP, inventor of improvements to the microscope and they had four children, their eldest son being Robert Warington Jr., FRS, the father of Katherine Warington. Robert Warington Sr. died on 17 November 1867 at Budleigh Salterton, Devon.

== Scientific work ==
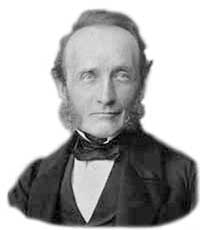
Robert Warington 1807–1867

In 1831 he published his first research, on a native sulphide of bismuth. In 1839 he started a movement to found the Chemical Society of London, convening the first meeting in 1841 and serving as its first Secretary for ten years. In 1844 he began a series of investigations into the adulteration of tea, and gave evidence at the parliamentary inquiry in 1855. In 1845 he was one of the founders of the Royal College of Chemistry, later part of Imperial College, London. In 1846 he took part in the formation of the Cavendish Society, of which he was secretary for three years, and from then on had many engagements as chemical expert in legal cases.

In 1851 he revised the ‘'Translation of the Pharmacopœia of the Royal College of Physicians'’ into English, left unfinished by Richard Phillips. He was also engaged in the construction of the British Pharmacopoeia from 1864, and was joint editor with Boverton Redwood of the second edition in 1867. In 1854 he was appointed chemical referee by four of the London coal gas suppliers, and held this post for seven years. In 1864 he was elected a Fellow of the Royal Society, and the Royal Society's catalogue lists 47 papers written by him alone.

The "aquarium principle" was discovered by Warington, who worked out that plants added to water in a container would give off enough oxygen to support animals, so long as their numbers do not grow too large. He published his findings in 1851 in the Quarterly Journal of the Chemical Society of London. and his work is the origin of modern aquaria.
