= John Thomas Cooper =

English chemist

- Born: 1790
- Died: 1854 (aged 63–64)

John Thomas Cooper (1790–1854) was an English chemist notable as a lecturer, chemical supplier and chemical analyst, at a time when interest was burgeoning in chemistry as a discipline of study and application.

== Biography ==
Cooper was born in Greenwich and studied and for a short while practised medicine. Finding the life of general practitioner stressful and tiring, he turned instead to chemistry, to which he applied himself with zeal. Until 1842 he lectured in chemistry at a number of establishments, including the Russell Institution, the Aldersgate School of Medicine, and the Webb Street School of Anatomy and Medicine in Southwark.

Cooper acted as a manufacturer and supplier of chemicals - "at one time the sole supplier of iodine in Britain" according to the Oxford Dictionary of National Biography. He devised or collaborated to produce a number of tools and techniques for which he won repute, including a hydrometer, an oxy-hydrogen microscope (the gasses providing a bright light-source), a baroscope, a refractometer; improvements in electroplating, electric cell design, and microscope mountings.

He was employed as a chemical analyst and appeared at court as an expert witness on a number of occasions. He provided expert services to a Royal Society and Board of Longitude initiative to improve the optical qualities of glass; and testimonials of the purity of a new line of brandy to its manufacturers for use in its advertising. He discovered iodoform but did not publish, that honour falling to Georges-Simon Serullas.

Cooper was vice-president of the London Chemical Society during its short incarnation. One of Cooper's students, Robert Warington founded the Chemical Society of London, and Cooper was an "energetic early Fellow".

Cooper's name and excellent reputation is not entirely free from controversy, however. He is implicated in the support of a patent for the use of hyposulphite of soda to fix daguerreotype images, despite clear indications that he was aware of prior art demonstrated and published by Sir John Herschel.
