= Chemical Society =

Learned society in the UK, precursor to the Royal Society of Chemistry

The Chemical Society was a scientific society formed in 1841 (then named the Chemical Society of London) by 77 scientists as a result of increased interest in scientific matters. Chemist Robert Warington was the driving force behind its creation.

== The London Chemical Society 1824 ==
The early days of the 1824 Chemical Society came with a rough start. Among the artisan class, the magazine The Chemist, written by John Knight and Henry Lacey, had started to get some traction. Some argue that they falsely mentioned that the 1824 Chemical Society was attempting to gather an educated upper and middle-class group of chemists and philosophers. Because of this, the writers of The Chemist maintained a very practical and anti-theoretical bias, as they had lashed out at the time wasted by academic chemists researching atomic weight distributions. To find a means of how this society should be better set up and run, correspondents and proponents of The Chemist advised that membership in The Chemical Society be limited to 20, pay a subscription fee, and cast ballots as to how they are to run the society. The thought was that the society would adopt a more experimental system as opposed to the previously disliked theoretical system. In doing so, members would give a lecture, and illustrative of the experiments they performed.

Later, the official launch of the "London Chemistry Society" started with the new promise of "the study of chemistry and all its branches", with The Chemist working along-side them. Despite its founding in 1824, it is doubtful that the Chemical Society made it into 1825. The Chemical Society of London, however, would eventually be founded under Robert Warington and had much more success than its predecessor.

== History ==
One of the aims of the Chemical Society was to hold meetings for "the communication and discussion of discoveries and observations, an account of which shall be published by the Society". In 1847, its importance was recognized by a Royal Charter, which added to its role in the advancement of science, the development of chemical applications in industry. Only a decade after the creation of the Chemical Society of London, the society faced financial difficulties. Its survival was only possible through a merge with the Government School of Mines, now known as the Royal School of Mines, in 1853. One of the major issues was that most Chemical Society members were in London. In contrast, most industries were located farther north, with South Lancashire becoming one of the most important parts of the British chemical industry, overshadowing the Chemical Society's work.

The reason why the Chemical Society worked with the Government School of Mines is because they did extensive work with mines as well. The Chemical Society's work with mines focused on testing and sampling gases. Dr. Graham worked at Newcastle Coal Mines examining "light carbureted gas"(methane). This work was crucial as mining safety concerns grew, especially after the Felling Colliery Disaster, which led to the founding of the Society for the Prevention of Accidents in Coal Mines in 1813.

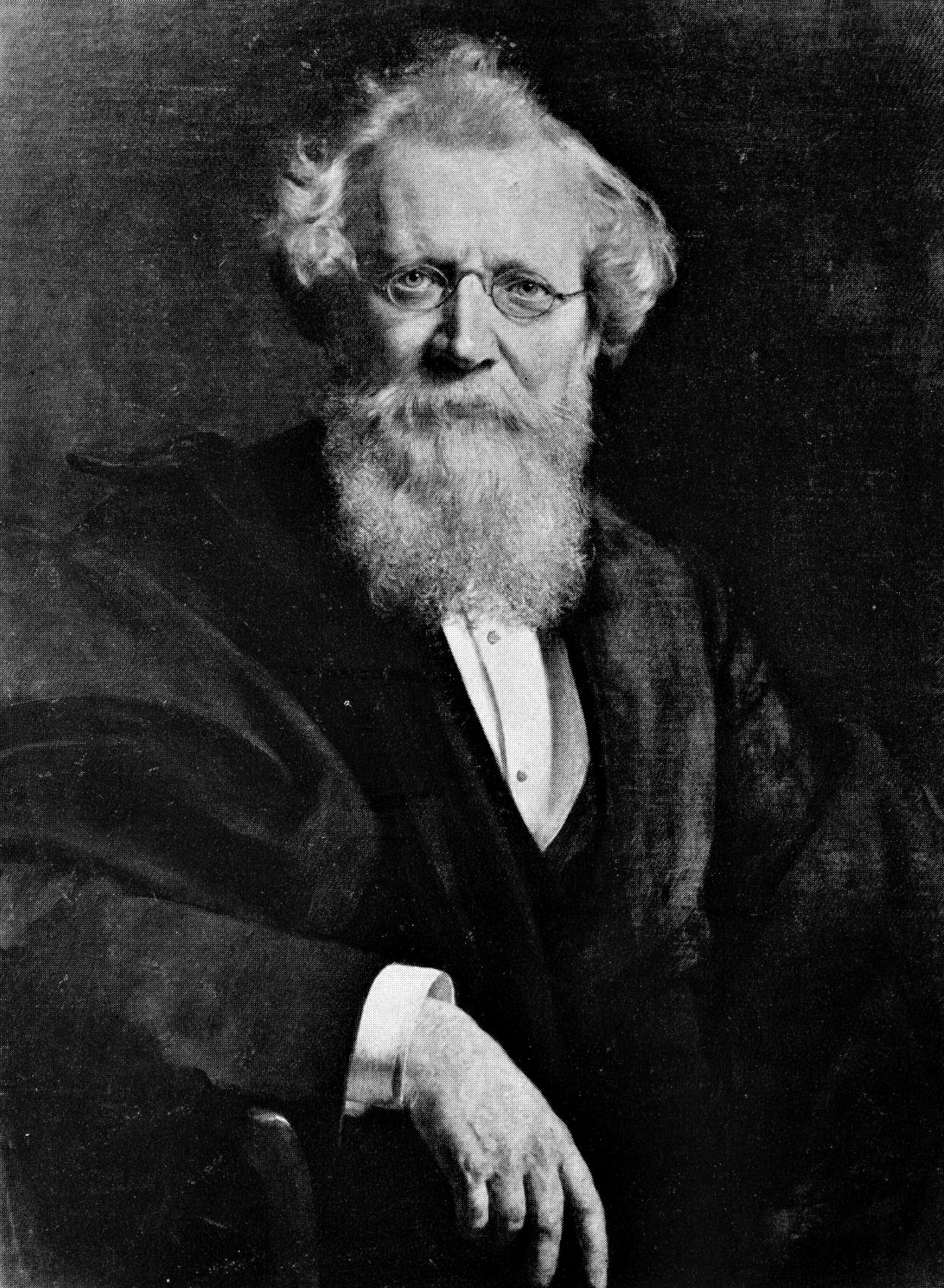
August Wilhelm Hofmann, (This picture was taken in 1890)

Although the Chemical Society often did not work with some larger chemical industries, smaller London industries offered collaboration opportunities. This included photography, which required fine chemicals for development, natural dyes, and drugs. August Wilhelm Hofmann, a prominent member, conducted groundbreaking research on coal tar products for two decades. Hofmann's work transformed coal tar from a waste material into a valuable resource for creating vibrant dyes, establishing a new industrial sector. His contributions led to his election as president of the Chemical Society in 1861.

Now because of the "marriage of science and industry heralded the creation of London's Royal College of Chemistry," lead to the increasing role of the Chemistry Society in London's Chemical industry. Membership was open to all those interested in chemistry, but fellowship was restricted to men only.

The Chemical Society of London succeeded where a number of previous chemical associations - the Lunar Society's London branch chemical society of the 1780s, the Animal Chemical Club of 1805, the London Chemical Society of 1824 - failed. Many of these societies mentioned built the basis on which the Chemical Society of London was founded. One assertion of a cause of success of the Chemical Society of London is that it was, unlike its forerunners, a "fruitful amalgamation of the technological and academic chemist".

Robert Warington had an upbringing in chemistry that ultimately led to the creation of the Chemical Society of London (in 1841). Warington had started making a name for himself in the chemistry world, having close ties with Liebig and Faraday. Using this, after working for 7 years in a brewery, he departed 2 years later, during which, he began paving the way for the founding of a Chemical Society in London. Utilizing connections he had made throughout his professional career he reached out to numerous chemists to create the first meeting of the official Chemical Society of London (March 30, 1841). By this meeting, they had acquired seventy-seven men as new fellows. One of the men from the Chemical Society of 1824, George Smith, was also a member of this 1841 society. Their numbers would grow to over one hundred by the year 1867. The society used its scholarly background to display its reputation and stature and grow its connections to elevate itself and its members.

Its activities expanded over the years, including eventually becoming a major publisher in the field of chemistry. On May 15, 1980, it amalgamated with the Royal Institute of Chemistry, the Faraday Society, and the Society for Analytical Chemistry to become the Royal Society of Chemistry. The Chemical Society also was expanding far before this as Roberts and Simmons wrote about British Chemical Societies, "Throughout the first half of the twentieth century, of those who worked outside the UK, more than half worked in Europe, the United States, or a range of other countries outwith the British Empire."

== Women in The Chemical Society ==
After a proposal in 1880 questioning women's membership in The Chemical Society, it was decided that any women present in the Chemical Society were only guests as the Presidential address from Birkbeck revealed that women were not eligible for membership. This is something that would hold true until 1920. That, however, was not the only time this topic would be brought up as a similar proposal was brought up and rejected in 1888. Much of the reasoning behind the rejection of these proposals has to do with Henry Armstrong stating, "for fear of sacrificing their womanhood; they are those who should be regarded as chosen people, as destined to be the mothers of future chemists of ability."

In 1904, Edith Humphrey, thought to be the first British woman to gain a doctorate in chemistry (at the University of Zurich), was one of nineteen women chemists to petition the Chemical Society for admission of women to fellowship (largely inspired after the admission of Marie Curie as a foreign fellow). This was eventually granted in 1919, and Humphrey was subsequently elected to fellowship. This, however, was not the first attempt for women to enter The Chemical Society. In 1892, a woman (either Emily Lloyd or Lucy Boole) had tried. With that, William Ramsey emerged as a supporter within the society for the admission of women into The Chemical Society.

== Presidents ==
- Thomas Graham: 1841–1843
- Arthur Aikin: 1843–1845
- Thomas Graham: 1845–1847
- William Thomas Brande: 1847–1849
- Richard Phillips: 1849–1851
- Charles Daubeny: 1851–1853
- Colonel Philip Yorke: 1853–1855
- William Allen Miller: 1855–1857
- Sir Lyon Playfair: 1857–1859
- Sir Benjamin Brodie: 1859–1861
- August Wilhelm von Hofmann: 1861–1863
- Alexander William Williamson: 1863–1865
- William Allen Miller: 1865–1867
- Warren de la Rue: 1867–1869
- Alexander William Williamson: 1869–1871
- Sir Edward Frankland: 1871–1873
- William Odling: 1873–1875
- Sir Frederick Augustus Abel: 1875–1877
- John Hall Gladstone: 1877–1878
- Warren de la Rue: 1879–1880
- Sir Henry Enfield Roscoe: 1880–1882
- Sir Joseph Henry Gilbert: 1882–1883
- William Henry Perkin: 1883–1885
- Hugo Müller: 1885–1887
- Sir William Crookes: 1887–1889
- William James Russell: 1889–1891
- Alexander Crum Brown: 1891–1893
- Henry Edward Armstrong: 1893–1895
- Augustus George Vernon Harcourt: 1895–1897
- Sir James Dewar: 1897–1899
- Sir Thomas Edward Thorpe: 1899–1901
- James Emerson Reynolds: 1901–1903
- William Augustus Tilden: 1903–1905
- Raphael Meldola: 1905–1907
- Sir William Ramsay: 1907–1909
- Harold Baily Dixon: 1909–1911
- Percy Faraday Frankland: 1911–1913
- Sir William Henry Perkin Jnr: 1913–1915
- Alexander Scott: 1915–1917
- Sir William Jackson Pope: 1917–1919
- James Johnston Dobbie: 1919–1921
- Sir James Walker: 1921–1923
- William Palmer Wynne: 1923–1925
- Arthur William Crossley: 1925–1926
- Herbert Brereton Baker: 1926–1928
- Sir Jocelyn Field Thorpe: 1928–1931
- George Gerald Henderson: 1931–1933
- Sir Gilbert Thomas Morgan: 1933–1935
- Nevil Vincent Sidgwick: 1935–1937
- Sir Frederick George Donnan: 1937–1939
- Sir Robert Robinson: 1939–1941
- James Charles Philip: 1941 to August 1941
- William Hobson Mills: 1941–1944
- Walter Norman Haworth: 1944–1946
- Sir Cyril Norman Hinshelwood: 1946–1948
- Sir Ian Morris Heilbron: 1948–1950
- Sir Eric Keightley Rideal: 1950–1952
- Sir Christopher Kelk Ingold: 1952–1954
- William Wardlaw: 1954–1956
- Sir Edmund Langley Hirst: 1956–1958
- Harry Julius Emeleus: 1958–1960
- Lord Alexander Robertus Todd: 1960–1962
- John Monteath Robertson: 1962–1964
- Sir Ewart Ray Herbert Jones: 1964–1966
- Sir Harry Work Melville: 1966–1968
- Sir Ronald Sydney Nyholm: 1968–1970
- Lord George Porter: 1970–1972
- Sir Frederick Sydney Dainton: 1972–1973
- Sir Derek Harold Richard Barton: 1973–1974
- Jack Wheeler Barrett: 1974–1975
- Frank Arnold Robinson: 1975–1976
- Cyril Clifford Addison: 1976–1977
- Alan Woodworth Johnson: 1977–1978
- Theodore Morris Sugden: 1978–1979
- Dr Alfred Spinks: 1979–1980

== Original members ==
On 23 February 1841, a meeting was convened to take into consideration the formation of a Chemical Society. The Provisional Committee appointed for carrying that object into effect invited a number of gentlemen engaged in the practice and pursuit of chemistry to become original members. The following 77 communicated their written assent:

- Arthur Aikin
- Thomas Andrews
- J A Barron
- James Blake
- William Blythe
- William Thomas Brande
- E W Brayley
- Henry James Brooke
- Charles Button
- Thomas Clark
- William John Cock
- John Thomas Cooper
- John Thomas Cooper Jnr.
- Andrew Crosse
- Walter Crum
- James Cumming
- John Frederic Daniell
- Charles Daubeny
- Edmund Davy
- Warren De la Rue
- Thomas Everitt
- William Ferguson
- George Fownes
- A Frampton
- J P Gassiot
- Thomas Gill
- Thomas Graham
- John Graham
- John Joseph Griffin
- Thomas Griffiths
- William Robert Grove
- Charles Heisch
- Henry Hennell
- Thomas Hetherington Henry
- William Herapath
- Thomas Charles Hope
- F R Hughes
- Percival Johnson
- James Johnston
- W B Leeson
- George Dixon Longstaff
- George Lowe
- Robert Macgregor
- Charles Macintosh
- John Mercer
- William Hallowes Miller
- Thomas Moody
- David Mushet
- J A Paris
- H L Pattinson
- Thomas Pearsall
- Frederic Penny
- William Haseldine Pepys
- Richard Phillips
- Lyon Playfair
- Robert Porrett
- L H Potts
- G Owen Rees
- David Boswell Reid
- Thomas Richardson
- Maurice Scanlan
- Ollive Sims
- Denham Smith
- Edward Solly Jnr
- John Stenhouse
- Richard Taylor
- John Tennent
- E F Teschemacher
- Thomas Thomson
- Robert Dundas Thomson
- Wilton George Turner
- Robert Warington
- William West
- James Low Wheeler
- George Wilson
- John Wilson
- Philip Yorke

== See also ==
- Journal of the Chemical Society
- Proceedings of the Chemical Society
- Chemical Society Reviews
