= James Emerson Reynolds =

Irish chemist

- Born: 8 January 1844; 5 Booterstown Avenue, Blackrock, County Dublin, Ireland
- Died: 18 February 1920 (aged 76); Kensington, London, England

James Emerson Reynolds (8 January 1844 – 18 February 1920) was an Irish chemist who was the first scientist to isolate thiourea and developed the "Reynolds's test" for acetone.

== Early life and family ==
James Emerson Reynolds was born at 5 Booterstown Avenue, Blackrock, County Dublin on 8 January 1844. His father, James Reynolds, was a doctor, and his mother (née Campbell) was from England. He was named after, Captain Emerson, RN, his great-uncle. He helped in his father's apothecaries’ hall in Booterstown in his youth, and became his assistant when he left school. He became interested in chemistry, and set up a small laboratory at the family home. He published his first two papers in 1861, at age 17, "On a new process for photographic printing" in the British Journal of Photography and "On the oleaginous matter formed on dissolving different kinds of iron in dilute acids" in Chemical News.

On 12 February 1875 he married Janet Elizabeth Finlayson. They had one son, Alfred John and one daughter, Marion Janet Elizabeth.

== Career ==
He became an assistant chemist in the Dublin Chemical Society, and in the next 3 published a number of papers on a range of subjects in Journal of the Royal Dublin Society and Chemical News. He continued to research photography, publishing more papers in the British Journal of Photography from 1861 to 1865. He became the editor of the British Journal Photographic Almanac in 1864. With the encouragement of his father, Reynolds studied medicine at the Royal College of Physicians and Surgeons in Edinburgh, receiving his licentiate 1865. He practised for a short time after he returned to Dublin, but left medicine after the death of his father and returned to chemistry. Although he had no formal training in chemistry, at age 23, he was offered the position of keeper of minerals in the Royal Dublin Society (RDS) in March 1867. This gave him access to a full, professional laboratory, and the following year he became the RDS's chemical analyst. That same year, 1868, he isolated thiourea (thiocarbamide), a sulphur equivalent of urea, the first person to do so successfully. He published his findings in the Journal of the Chemical Society of London in 1869. He continued to work on urea, producing many new substitution products and over 16 sixteen derivatives of silicon. He described the preparation of a compound of acetone with mercuric oxide in 1871, which was the basis of a test for acetone known as "Reynolds's test". His work for the RDS included investigating cattle food and artificial fertilisers for adulteration, inspecting the RDS gas supply, and testing the purity of whiskey from Irish distilleries. The development of a new spectroscope by the Dublin Grubb firm in 1870 was an aid to his work. Reynolds' took part in scientific meetings and public lectures on topics such as absorption spectra and ozone. He was granted the title of professor of analytic chemistry in 1872, having requested the title, and made him the first person in Britain or Ireland to hold such a title. From 1870 to 1875, he was professor of chemistry and physics at the Royal College of Surgeons in Ireland (RCSI), as well as working as a public analyst and consultant. In 1875, he co-authored a Manual of public health in Ireland, and led the analysis of the Vartry water supply to Dublin.

He left the RDS and RCSI in 1875 to take up the post of professor of chemistry at Trinity College Dublin (TCD) in 1875, succeeding Dr James Apjohn. In 1876, TCD awarded him an honorary MD degree. He focused on teaching, updating the curriculum, and improving the accommodation of his class. He was known for his excellent, but strict lecturing style. He was a pioneer in using periodic tables in his lectures, and assigned beryllium its correct place. He emphasised the importance of learning chemistry through practical application, and produced the 4 volume Experimental chemistry for junior students textbook in 1882. It ran for several editions, and was translated into German. This success led to the widespread adoption of his new teaching methods. He also introduced a system of separate examination papers for organic, inorganic, and practical chemistry. Alongside George Francis Fitzgerald, he campaigned for greater recognition of the sciences in TCD. In 1888 he proposed a number of reforms introducing scholarships and studentships in the sciences and lengthening of the curricula, as well as degrees at under, postgraduate and research levels. In 1891, studentships and a D.Sc. were introduced to TCD, with Reynolds one of the first to be awarded a higher degree of D.Sc. He eventually resigned from TCD in 1903 citing inadequate pay. He moved to London, and from 1903 to 1911 conducted private research at the Davy-Faraday laboratory and a small home laboratory. He published his last work, "On the synthesis of silicalcyanide and of a feldspar" in 1913 in the Proceedings of the Royal Society.

Reynolds was a member of a number of institutions, including the Institute of Chemistry of Great Britain and Ireland, the Society of Chemical Industry, of which he was president from 1891-91, the Chemical Society and the Royal Society. In 1919 he had a serious accident, which was followed by a stroke. He died at his home 3 Inverness Gardens, Kensington on 18 February 1920. The chemistry department in TCD have his original specimen of thiourea on display.
