= Davy-Faraday Laboratory =

British laboratory

The Davy-Faraday Laboratory of the Royal Institution is an English laboratory that was established and equipped by Ludwig Mond as a dedicated center for research in pure and physical chemistry. The laboratory was opened on December 22, 1896, by the Prince of Wales (later King Edward VII), and was hailed as a significant contribution to British science.

== History ==
Mond endowed the laboratory with £100,000, including £38,000 for its construction and equipment and £62,000 as an endowment fund to ensure its ongoing maintenance and efficiency. The facility was furnished with modern instruments and appliances for conducting advanced research and was described as the only public laboratory in the world solely devoted to research in pure science at the time.

Mond's vision for the laboratory included its association with the Royal Institution, which had an association with Humphry Davy and Michael Faraday, whose names the laboratory commemorates. The building was designed to accommodate independent investigators, and preference was given to those who had already demonstrated significant contributions to science.

Lord Rayleigh and James Dewar, prominent figures in physics and chemistry, served as the laboratory’s directors without remuneration. The Prince of Wales praised the laboratory for its state-of-the-art facilities and its potential to advance scientific knowledge and innovation.

Research conducted in the Davy-Faraday Laboratory includes:

- Heinrich Debus: "Contributions to the History of Glyoxalic Acid"
- Hugo Müller : "Quercitol, Cocositol, Inositol, Flavon"
- Horace T. Brown: "Starch: Its Transformations and Derivatives"
- John Young Buchanan: "The Specific Gravity of Soluble Salts"
- James Emerson Reynolds: "Silicon Researches"
- Joseph Petavel: "Standards of Light" and "Gaseous Explosive Mixtures"
- Alexander Scott: "Atomic Weight of Carbon"
- William James Russell: "Action of Wood on Photographic Plates in the Dark"

The Davy-Faraday Laboratory was celebrated as a pioneering establishment that supported the advancement of scientific research and the development of innovative ideas in the fields of chemistry and physics.
