= Lilian Clarke =

Botanist and teacher

Lillian Clarke
- Born: 27 January 1866
- Died: 12 February 1934 (aged 68)
- Occupations: Botanist and teacher
- Known for: Founder of The Botany Gardens

Lilian Clarke (27 January 1866 – 12 February 1934) was a botany teacher at James Allen's Girls' School in Dulwich, South London from 1896 to 1926, where she developed botanical gardens, which became known as 'The Botany Gardens'.

== Early life and education ==
She was born on 27 January 1866 to Benjamin Clarke, a philanthropist. At the age of nineteen she was awarded the Society of Apothecaries gold medal for her botanical studies undertaken at Chelsea Physic Garden and completed her BSc. Degree in 1893, after studying botany under Professor F.W. Oliver at University College London. Clarke become a Fellow of the Linnean Society of London, elected in one of the first groups of women Fellows during the period 1904–1905, following the announcement to admit women and was also active in the British Association for the Advancement of Science, serving as secretary of the Educational Section from 1921 to 1926. In 1917 the degree of Doctor of Science, for a thesis on the botanical education she had developed at James Allen's Girls' School, was conferred on Clarke by The University of London.

== The Botany Gardens ==
The Botany Gardens were an outdoor laboratory, the first such at a school in the UK, where subjects such as plant growth and pollination could be observed. Clarke encouraged her pupils to make their own books rather than use textbooks. When the ecology of plants took precedence over knowledge of 'the natural orders' in examinations, Clarke, supported by the eminent British ecologist Arthur George Tansley, created a new series of beds in her garden to replicate examples of British habitats, such as salt marsh and pebble beach. The support of William Hales, curator of Chelsea Physic Garden from 1899 to 1937 to Clarke is recorded in her publication, The Botany Gardens Of The James Allen's Girls' School, Dulwich: Their History And Organisation, published by the London Board of Education. Clarke describes the plants at the edge of the pond:

Forget-Me-Knots, Brooklime, Musk, Water-Mint, Yellow Iris, Water Plantain, Arrowhead, etc. A little farther in are partially submerged plants such as Water Lilies, Floating Pondweed, and totally submerged plants such as Elodea. Some of the pond plants were given by Mr. Hales, Curator of the Chelsea Physic Garden, to whom many thanks are due for valuable help in designing the pond and in other matters.

— Clarke

Clarke goes on to say that: 'The pond has proved a great success and of the utmost value in our lessons.' Significantly, for contemporary botanical educators, Clarke also stated, in a book published posthumously, that the gardens 'have become, in many cases, out-of-door laboratories, and the work indoors and out of doors is one.'

Clarke communicated with representatives of the professional botanical community and worked hard to be visible in the wider scientific milieu of her time.

Clarke died in a nursing home on 12 February 1934.

== Sources ==
- Brenchley, W. (1934) Dr. Lilian Clarke (Obituary), Nature, March 24
- Clarke, L. (1922) The Botany Gardens of James Allen's Girls' School, Dulwich: Their History and Organisation. London: London Board of Education
- Clarke, L., 1935. Botany as an Experimental Science in Laboratory and Garden, Oxford: Oxford University Press.
- Fogg, E. (1934) Lilian J. Clarke obituary, Proceedings of the Linnean Society of London October 1933- May 1934, London: Linnean Society
- Linnean Society. Proceedings of the Linnean Society of London 1904–1905. London: Linnean Society
