= Endymion (crater) =

Crater on the Moon

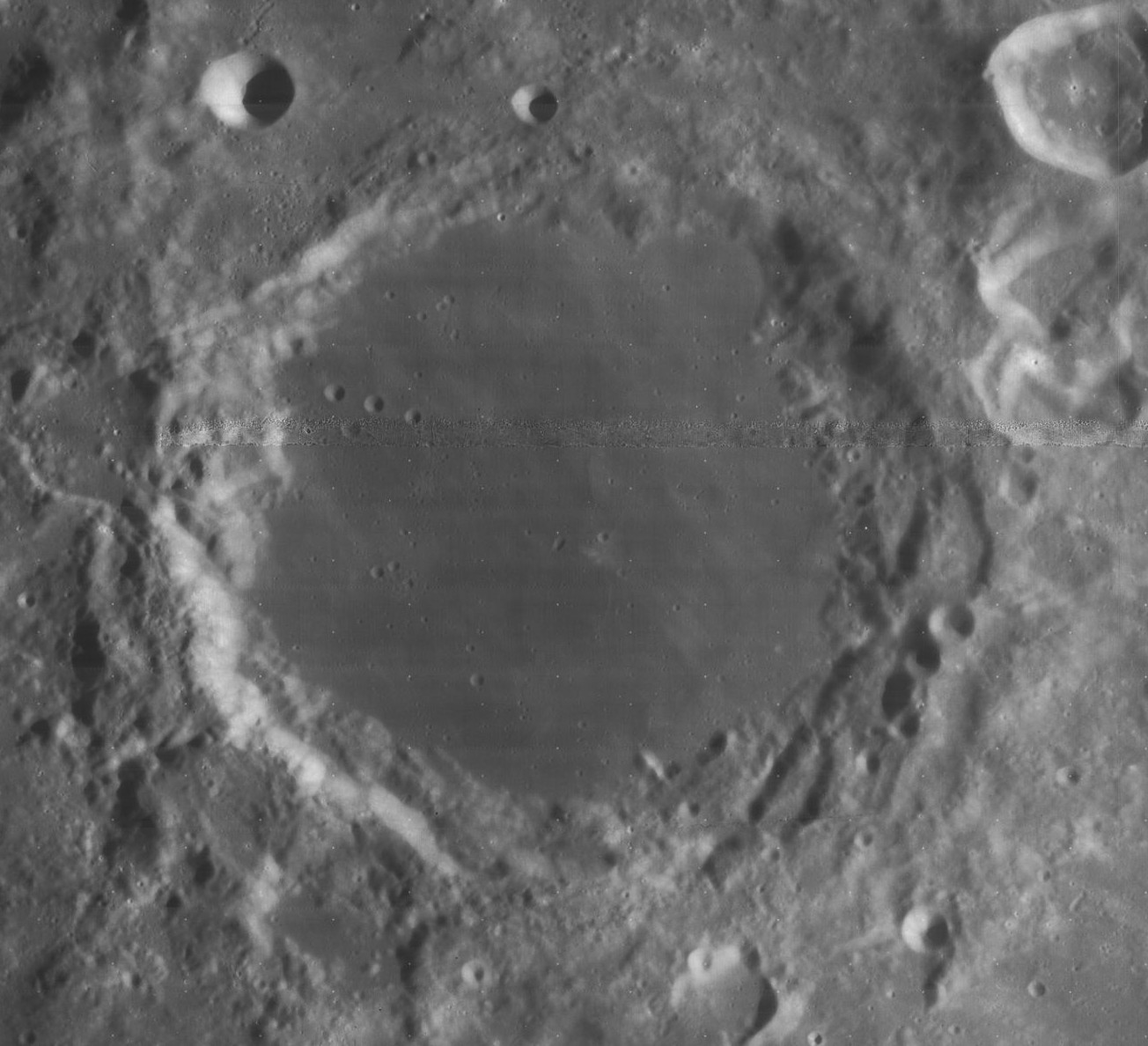
- Lunar Orbiter 4 image
- Coordinates: 53.61°N 56.48°E
- Diameter: 122.10 km (75.87 mi)
- Depth: 2.6 km (1.6 mi)
- Colongitude: 306° at sunrise
- Formation: Nectarian
- Eponym: Endymion

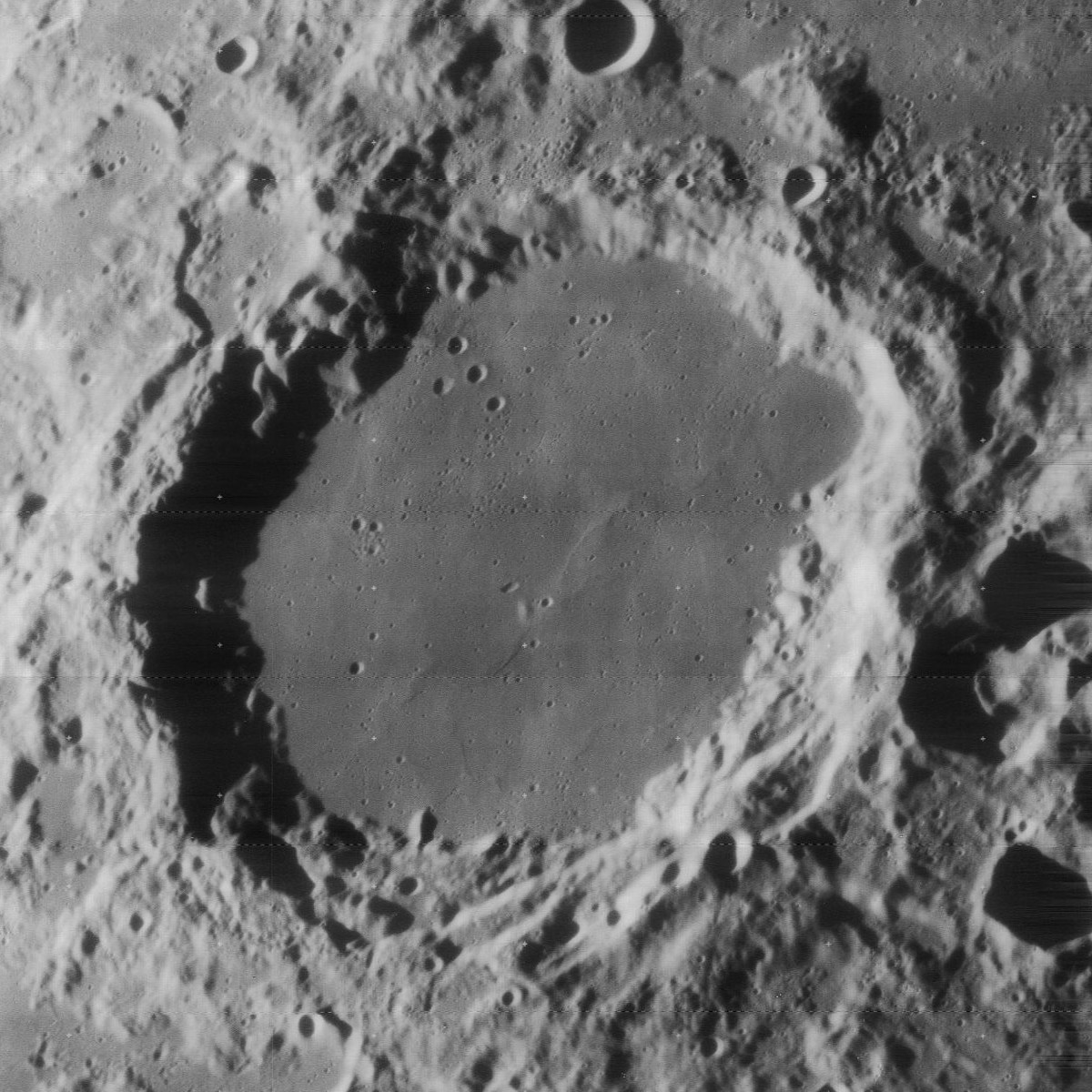
Oblique Lunar Orbiter 4 image facing northwest

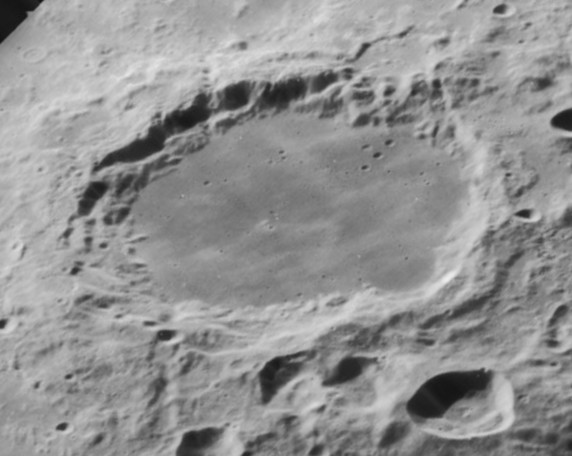
Another oblique Lunar Orbiter 4 image facing west

Endymion is a lunar impact crater that lies near the northeast limb of the Moon. Visibility is subject to libration, with T. W. Webb describing it as sometimes "very dark" at full Moon. It is located to the east of Mare Frigoris and north of Lacus Temporis. To the southwest is the somewhat smaller crater Atlas. Because of its location, Endymion has an oval appearance from foreshortening. Beyond the crater along the lunar limb is the Mare Humboldtianum.

On the lunar geologic timescale, Endymion is one of the largest craters of Nectarian age. The high, worn walls of its rim reach altitudes of up to 4.6 km. The lithology of the rim appears rich in Mg-spinel that is in close association with orthopyroxene-olivine assemblages. The outer rampart is low, wide, and worn from impact erosion.

The floor has been covered in low-albedo basalt that gives it a dark appearance and makes it relatively easy to locate. The surface is relatively smooth, with only a few craterlets located within the rim. A string of three lies near the northwestern inner wall. There are dark patches that appear to change shape as the Sun rises. These fooled American astronomer W. H. Pickering into suggesting them as due to vegetation.

A wrinkle ridge crosses the crater floor of Endymion, and near the center is a low, eroded hill that may be the summit of a central peak that is now almost completely submerged by lava. Faint streaks of ray material from Thales to the north-northwest cross the dark floor.

The Endymion formation is named after the Greek mythological character. His name was included in the lunar nomenclature of Italian astronomer Giovanni Battista Riccioli in 1651. Its designation was formally recognized by the IAU in 1935.

== Satellite craters ==
By convention, these features are identified on lunar maps by placing the letter on the side of the crater midpoint that is closest to Endymion.

Endymion	Latitude	Longitude	Diameter
A	54.7° N	62.8° E	30 km
B	59.8° N	67.2° E	59 km
C	58.4° N	60.8° E	32 km
D	52.4° N	62.4° E	20 km
E	53.6° N	66.2° E	18 km
F	56.9° N	65.1° E	12 km
G	56.4° N	55.6° E	15 km
H	51.1° N	56.3° E	14 km
J	53.5° N	50.7° E	67 km
K	51.3° N	52.3° E	7 km
L	55.4° N	71.0° E	9 km
M	52.7° N	70.9° E	9 km
N	52.4° N	69.6° E	9 km
W	52.7° N	69.2° E	10 km
X	52.9° N	50.1° E	6 km
Y	55.8° N	58.0° E	8 km

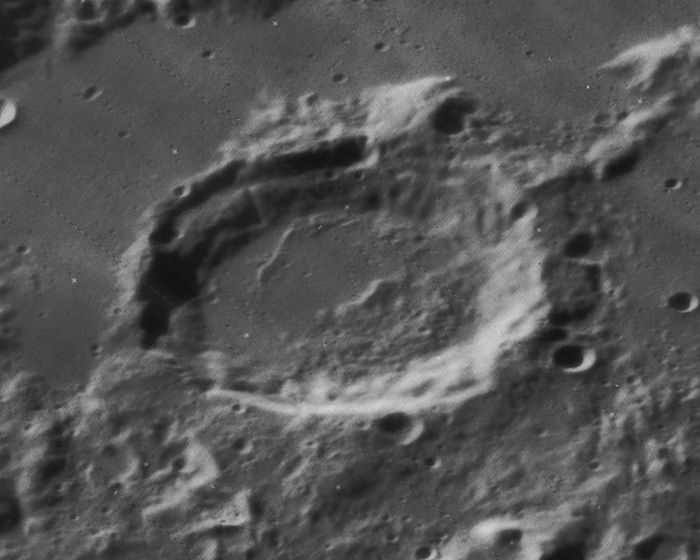
Oblique view of Endymion B from Lunar Orbiter 4
