= Henry Hennell =

English chemist

Henry Hennell FRS (c. 1797 – 4 June 1842) was an English chemist.

Hennelll was one of the founders of the Chemical Society of London and was a member of the first elected Council of the Chemical Society. He was elected F.R.S. in 1829. He worked as Chemical Operator at Apothecaries' Hall, London.

In 1825 Michael Faraday discovered that sulfuric acid could absorb large volumes of coal gas. He gave the resulting solution to Hennell, who found in 1826 that it contained "sulphovinic acid" (ethyl hydrogen sulfate). Hennell's finding was a major breakthrough in the synthesis of ethanol and led to major developments in organic chemistry.

The late Sir Humphry Davy entertained and expressed the highest opinion of him as a man of science—and he was held in equal esteem by Professor Brande and Mr. Faraday, of the former of whom he was a pupil for fourteen years. He lost his life in a very shocking manner. He was, at the urgent request of the East India Company, preparing about six pounds of fulminating mercury for the percussion caps to be used in the East, when a tremendous explosion took place, which alarmed the whole neighbourhood, destroyed 1000 panes of glass, and blew the unfortunate gentleman to pieces.

One arm was found on the roof of the Apothecaries' Hall, and a finger was picked up in Union Street more than a hundred yards distant.

Hennell's successor as Chemical Operator at Apothecaries' Hall was Robert Warington.

== Selected publications ==
- Hennell, Henry; Brande, William Thomas (1826). "On the mutual action of sulphuric acid and alcohol, with observations on the composition and properties of the resulting compound". Philosophical Transactions of the Royal Society of London. 116: 240–249. doi:10.1098/rstl.1826.0021. S2CID 98278290.
- "On the Mutual Action of Sulphuric Acid and Alcohol, and on the Nature of the Process by Which Ether is Formed". Philosophical Transactions of the Royal Society of London. 118: 365–371. 1828. doi:10.1098/rstl.1828.0021. S2CID 98483646.
