= Winifred Brenchley =

British botanist (1883–1953)

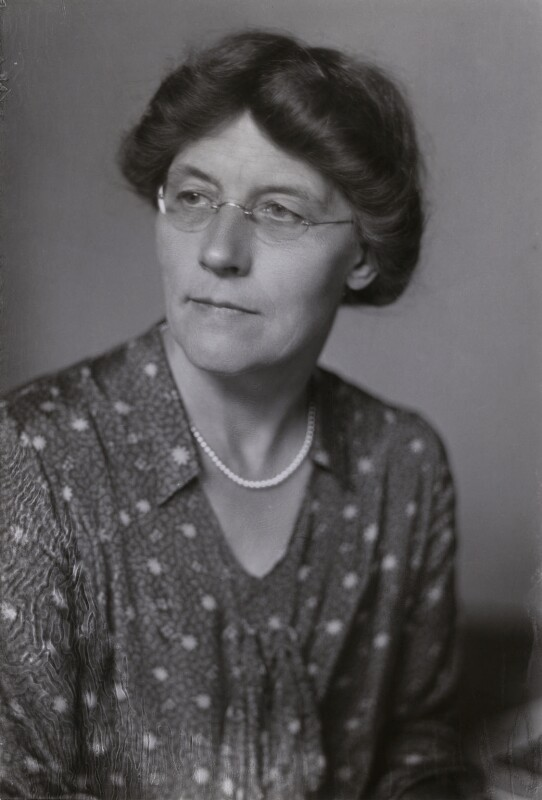
Brenchley in the 1940s

Winifred Elsie Brenchley OBE, DSc (Lond), FLS, FRES (1883–1953), an agricultural botanist who worked at the Rothamsted Research Station. Along with Katherine Warington, she demonstrated the role of boron as an essential micronutrient for plants. She was the first woman in the UK to break into the male-dominated sphere of agricultural science. She has been described as "perhaps Britain's leading authority on weeds in the early twentieth century".

== Early life and education ==
Winifred Brenchley was born in London on 10, August, 1883 to Elizabeth Beckett and William Brenchley, a schoolmaster who was once the Mayor of Camberwell. Measles in childhood left her partially deaf. She was educated at James Allen's Girls' School in Dulwich, where one of her teachers was the well-known botanist Dr Lilian Clarke.

She attended Swanley Horticultural College for two years, completing her course in 1903. At the school, the new science-based study provided an alternative to the earlier emphasis on practical apprenticeship training, thus opening up male-dominated horticultural trades to women. By 1903 the college was only taking women students, to provide suitable occupations for unmarried women. (There was also a growing demand for horticulturalists and agriculturalists in the British colonies and it was felt that women were suited to this role.) Brenchley won the Royal Horticultural Society Silver Gilt medal but gave up gardening to study botany. She received her BSc from University College London in 1905, where she studied under Francis Wall Oliver. She was awarded a Gilchrist Scholarship for postgraduate study for 1906-7 and was awarded a DSc from the University of London in 1911 for her thesis: On the strength and development of the grain of wheat (Triticum vulgare). She became a Fellow of University College in 1914.

== Career ==
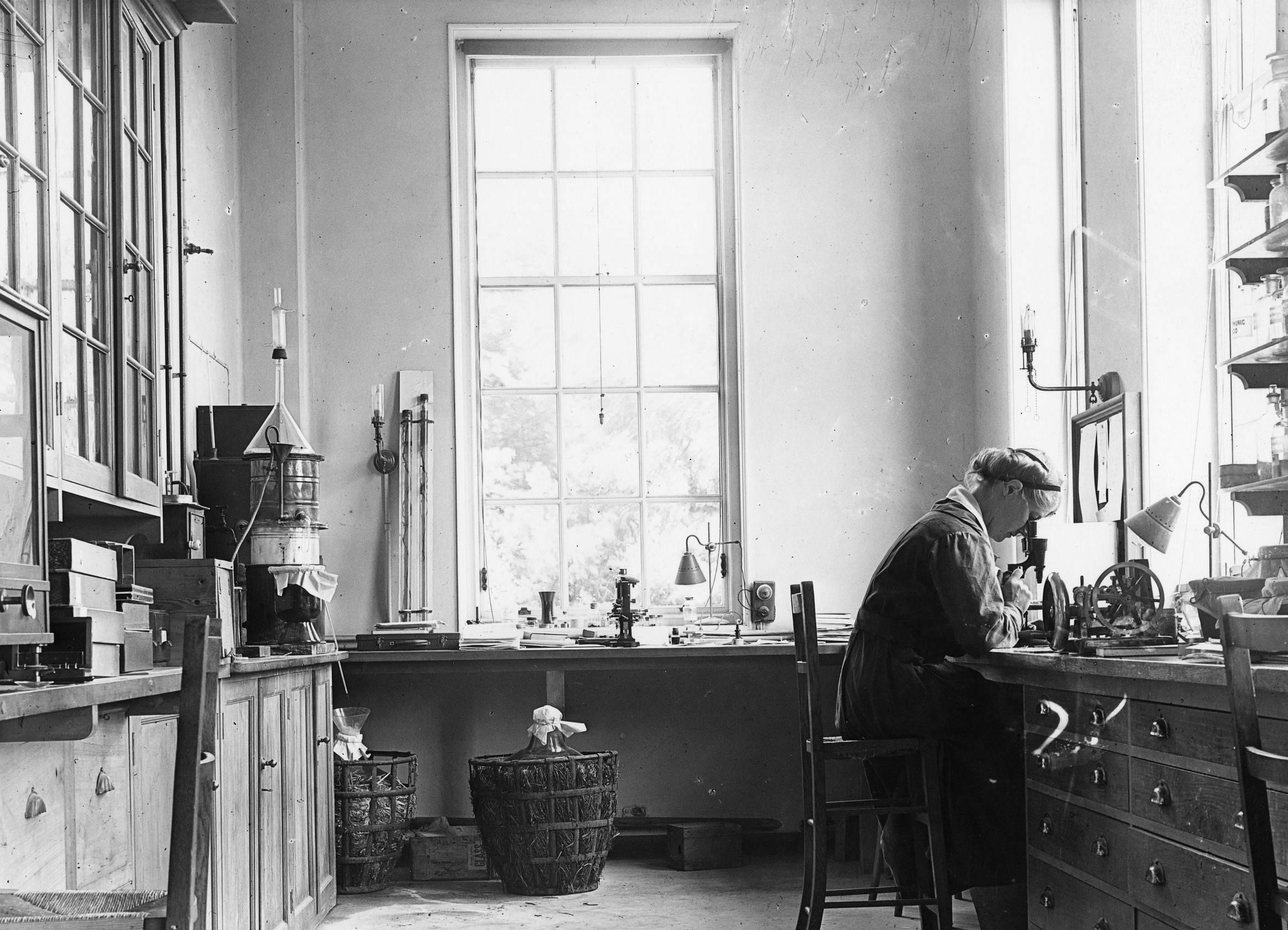
Brenchley working in her laboratory at Rothamsted Experimental Station

The Gilchrist Scholarship took her to Rothamsted Experimental Station in Harpenden. She was the first woman to work there in the 60 years of the laboratories' existence, and it was admitted that she was appointed 'because the funds available would not have attracted a suitable man'. At Rothamsted, where she was the only woman, a tradition of afternoon tea was established as it was considered appropriate for her by the rest of the male staff. It was this afternoon tea and a later woman scientist, Muriel Bristol, that inspired the famous work of R.A. Fisher, Lady tasting tea, on applying permutations in experiments. The quality of her work was soon apparent and after a year she became a permanent employee as head of the Botany Department, a post she held until her retirement at 65.

Early on at Rothamsted, she demonstrated her technical skills, improving the technique for growing plants in water culture and coming close to discovering the essential role of copper and zinc in plant nutrition, as detailed in her book Inorganic Plant Poisons and Simulants (1914, revised 1927). Katherine Warington's discovery of boron's role as a micronutrient in 1923 and the subsequent investigations into the effects of boron is perhaps the best-known work from her laboratory. Her other chief interest was in the ecology of weeds and Weeds of Farmland (1920) she produced the first comprehensive scientific study of weeds in the UK. Her work on the permanent Park Grass plots at Rothamsted resulted in another book Manuring of Grass Land for Hay (1924) describing how lime and fertilizers affect the botanical composition of grasslands.

Brenchley was elected a Fellow of the Linnean Society in 1910. In 1920, she became a Fellow of the Royal Entomological Society. She was closely associated with A D Imms with whom she collected in the field. Her main entomological interest was in the Lepidoptera. She was awarded the OBE in 1948, the year she retired.

== Later life ==
In retirement, Brenchley returned to her gardening. She was also bringing together vast quantities of unpublished material in her research notebooks, but she suffered a severe stroke and died in Harpenden on 27, October, 1953.

== Publications ==
- Inorganic Plant Poisons and Stimulants, Cambridge, Cambridge University Press, 1914 (Revised 1927)
- Weeds of Farm Land. London, Longmans Green, 1920
- Manuring of Grass Land for Hay London, Longmans, Green, 1924
- Suppression of Weeds by Fertilizers and Chemicals (with HC Long) London, Crosby Lockwood, 1949
- 52 scientific papers, many in the Annals of Botany. A bound volume of the collection is held at Rothamsted Library.
