= Warren De la Rue =

British astronomer, chemist and photographer

Warren De la Rue FRS FRAS
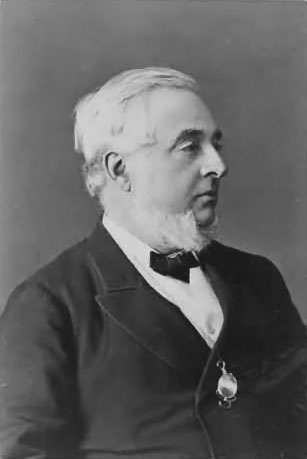
- Born: 18 January 1815; Guernsey, Channel Islands
- Died: 19 April 1889 (aged 74); Marylebone, London, England
- Spouse: Georgiana Bowles (m. 1840)
- Children: 5
- Father: Thomas de la Rue

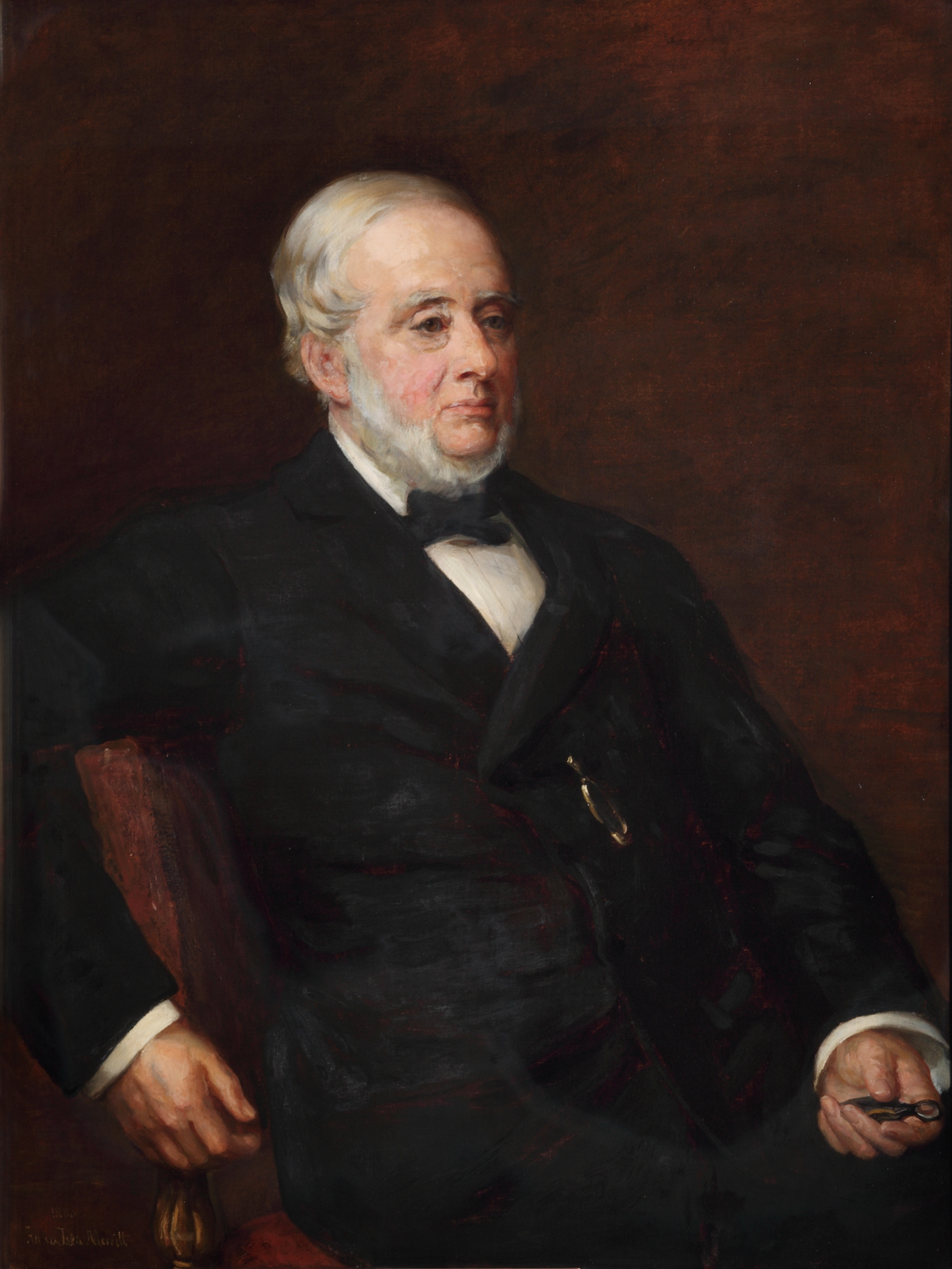
Portrait of Warren de la Rue (1886)

Warren De la Rue FRS FRAS (18 January 1815 – 19 April 1889) was a British astronomer, chemist, and inventor, most famous for his pioneering work in astronomical photography.

== Biography ==
He was born in Guernsey on the Channel Islands, the son of the founder of the large firm of stationers of that name in London, Thomas de la Rue and Jane (née Warren). Having completed his education at the Collège Sainte-Barbe in Paris, he entered his father's business, but devoted his leisure hours to chemical and electrical researches, and between 1836 and 1848 published several papers on these subjects.

In 1840, he enclosed a platinum coil in a vacuum tube and passed an electric current through it, thus creating one of the world's first electric light bulbs. The design was based on the concept that the high melting point of platinum would allow it to operate at high temperatures and that the evacuated chamber would contain fewer gas molecules to react with the platinum, improving its longevity. Although it was an efficient design, the cost of the platinum made it impractical for commercial use.

Attracted to astronomy by the influence of James Nasmyth, he constructed in 1850 a 13-inch reflecting telescope, mounted first at Canonbury, later at Cranford, Middlesex, and with its aid executed many drawings of the celestial bodies of singular beauty and fidelity.

His chief title to fame is his pioneering work in the application of the art of photography to astronomical research. In 1851 his attention was drawn to a daguerreotype of the moon by G. P. Bond, shown at the great exhibition of that year. Excited to emulate and employ the more rapid wet-collodion process, he succeeded before long in obtaining exquisitely defined lunar pictures, which remained unsurpassed until the appearance of the Lewis Morris Rutherfurd photographs in 1865. His contribution is marked by the naming of the De La Rue lunar crater.

In 1854 he turned his attention to solar physics, and for the purpose of obtaining a daily photographic representation of the state of the solar surface he devised the photoheliograph, described in his report to the British Association, On Celestial Photography in England (1859), and in his Bakerian Lecture (Phil. Trans. vol. clii. pp. 333–416). Regular work with this instrument, inaugurated at Kew by De la Rue in 1858, was carried on there for fourteen years; and was continued at the Royal Observatory, Greenwich, from 1873 to 1882. The results obtained in the years 1862–1866 were discussed in two memoirs, entitled Researches on Solar Physics, published by De la Rue, in conjunction with Professor Balfour Stewart and Mr B Loewy, in the Phil. Trans. (vol. clix. pp. 1–110, and vol. clx. pp. 389–496).

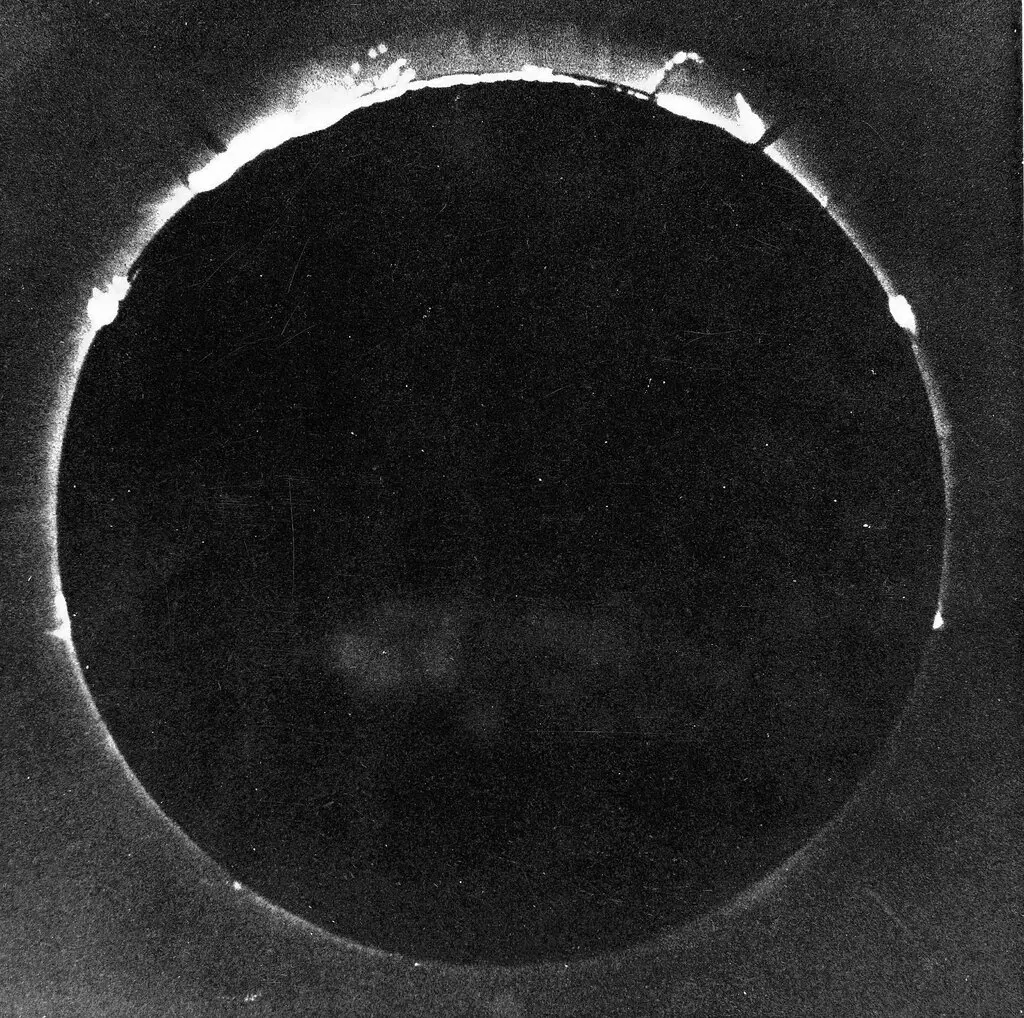
Photo of a total solar eclipse taken by De la Rue in 1860.

In 1860 De la Rue took the photoheliograph to Rivabellosa, Spain, for the purpose of photographing the total solar eclipse which occurred on 18 July of that year. He established his temporary observatory in the neighboring Quintanilla de la Ribera. This expedition formed the subject of the Bakerian Lecture already referred to. The photographs obtained on that occasion proved beyond doubt the solar character of the prominences or red flames, seen around the limb of the moon during a solar eclipse. In 1873 De la Rue gave up active work in astronomy, and presented most of his astronomical instruments to the university observatory, Oxford. Subsequently, in the year 1887, he provided the same observatory with a 13-inch refractor to enable it to take part in the International Photographic Survey of the Heavens.

With Dr Hugo Müller as his collaborator he published several papers of a chemical character between the years 1856 and 1862, and investigated, 1868–1883, the discharge of electricity through gases by means of a battery of 14,600 chloride of silver cells. He was twice president of the Chemical Society, and also of the Royal Astronomical Society (1864–1866) and in 1862 received the gold medal of the latter society. In June 1850 he was elected a Fellow of the Royal Society and in addition to their Bakerian Lecture in 1862 was awarded in 1864 their Royal Medal "for his observations on the 1860 total eclipse of the sun and his improvements in astronomical photography."

He died in Marylebone in 1889. He had married Georgiana, the third daughter of Thomas Bowles of Guernsey; they had four sons and one daughter.

== Honours and awards ==
- Awarded the Gold Medal of the Royal Astronomical Society in 1862.
- Awarded the Royal Medal from the Royal Society in 1864.
- Awarded the Lalande Prize in 1866.
- The crater De La Rue on the Moon is named after him.
- Commander of the Legion of Honor (France).
- Commander of the Order of St. Maurice and St. Lazarus (Italy).
- Knight of the Imperial Order of the Rose (Brazil).
