= Hugo Müller =

Anglo-German chemist (1833–1915)

- Born: 29 July 1833; Tirschenreuth, Germany
- Died: 23 May 1915 (aged 81); Camberley, England
- Education: University of Göttingen (PhD)
- Known for: Hexachlorobenzene
- Spouse: Elizabeth Russell (d. 1931)
- Children: 2
- Scientific career
- Fields: Analytical chemistry Horticulture
- Workplaces: Davy-Faraday Laboratory

Hugo Müller (29 July 1833 – 23 May 1915) was an Anglo-German analytical chemist, botanist and industrialist. He was a Fellow of the Royal Society. He is known for being the first person to synthesize hexachlorobenzene.

== Early life ==
Hugo Müller was born on 29 July 1833, in Tirschenreuth, Germany. He studied chemistry at Leipzig University. He was a student of Friedrich Wöhler at the University of Göttingen, where he earned his PhD. He was also assistant to Justus von Liebig at the Ludwig-Maximilians-Universität München.

== Career ==
Müller moved to the United Kingdom in 1855 to work with Warren De la Rue as recommended by Liebig. De la Rue and Müller developed a chloride of silver battery.

He earned a Legum Doctor degree from the University of St Andrews and a Doctor of Science degree from the University of Manchester. He also worked with John Stenhouse. Müller discovered that iodine could be used as a catalyst in chlorination.

In 1864, Müller discovered how to transform mono-functional carboxylic acids into di-functional ones by introducing an additional carboxyl group. Using this technique Müller managed to synthesize of succinic acid from propionic acid. Around the same time, Hermann Kolbe had independently discovered a similar reaction, transforming acetic acid into malonic acid—a process Müller had also investigated. During a meeting of the Chemical Society, Müller commented on an earlier publication by Maxwell Simpson on obtaining succinic acid from ethylene, but Müller still claimed priority over the succinic to propionic acid process. After Edward Frankland mediated the dispute through correspondence, Müller and Kolbe agreed to publish their findings side by side in the Journal of the Chemical Society. The priority of the discovery was also disputed by Hans Hübner who had partially published his work on the same reaction and by Friedrich Konrad Beilstein who accused Müller, Kolbe and others of unethical practices.

Kolbe and Müller agreed to collaborate, with Kolbe reserving exclusivity on cyanoacetic acids. However, the same year Müller also published the synthesis of trichloroacetic acid with potassium cyanide without notifying Kolbe. From that point forward, the two ceased all communication.

The same year, Müller also synthesized the compound hexachlorobenzene by the reaction of benzene and antimony pentachloride.

Müller became a consultant for De La Rue company before leaving academic research to pursue an industrial career. He became a partner of the company and remained there until 1902. The company manufactured postage stamps and banknotes. After retiring, he continued his research at the Davy-Faraday Laboratory. His work extended to horticulture. Studying the species of Primula, he discovered that their bloom is related the presence of flavone.

== Personal life and death ==
Müller married Elizabeth Russell in 1878, who survived him and died in 1931. They had two daughters. Müller was naturalized as a British citizen after marriage.

His work on horticulture led him to develop a vast garden in his home at Camberley, Surrey, England.

Hugo Müller died on 23 May 1915 at his home.

Since his school days Müller had collected mineral specimens, which his widow Elisabeth presented to the Oxford University Museum Of Natural History in 1915.

== Honors and awards ==
Müller was elected as a Fellow of the Royal Society on 7 June 1866. He was their treasurer but resigned from the society when World War I started, due to personal convictions.

He joined the Chemical Society in 1859, becoming its foreign secretary from 1869 to 1885 and president of the society from 1885 to 1887. He was also a member of the Royal Horticultural Society.
