= Strabo (crater) =

Crater on the Moon

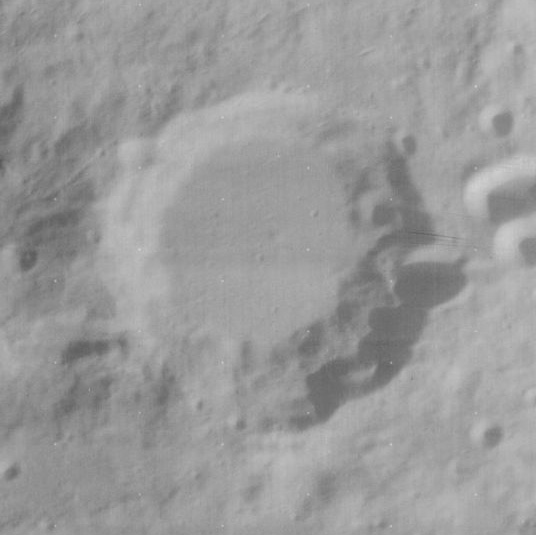
- Lunar Orbiter 4 image
- Coordinates: 61.9°N 54.3°E
- Diameter: 55 km
- Depth: 3.20 km (1.99 mi)
- Colongitude: 307° at sunrise
- Eponym: Strabo

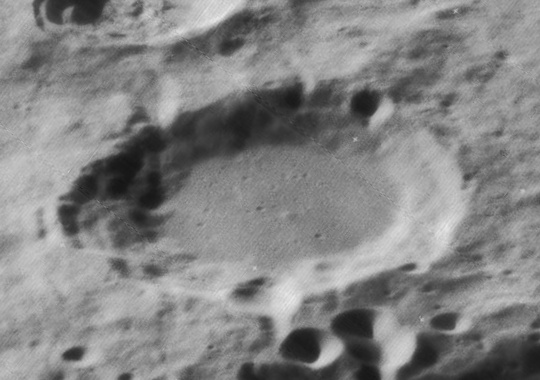
Oblique view of Strabo also from Lunar Orbiter 4

Strabo is a lunar impact crater that is located near the northeastern rim of the Moon. At this angle the crater appears oval in shape due to foreshortening. It is attached to the north rim of the walled plain called De La Rue. To the west is the smaller crater Thales. To the north is a chain of three comparably sized craters designated Strabo L, Strabo B, and Strabo N.

The inner rim of Strabo is terraced, with a small crater lying across the eastern wall. The interior has been flooded in the past by lava, and is now relatively flat.

== Satellite craters ==
By convention these features are identified on lunar maps by placing the letter on the side of the crater midpoint that is closest to Strabo.

| Strabo | Latitude | Longitude | Diameter |
|---|---|---|---|
| B | 64.6° N | 55.5° E | 23 km |
| C | 67.1° N | 59.3° E | 17 km |
| L | 64.2° N | 53.4° E | 26 km |
| N | 64.8° N | 57.8° E | 25 km |
