= Emily Lloyd (chemist) =

English chemist

Emily Jane Lloyd
- Born: 1860
- Died: 14 November 1912 (aged 51–52)
- Occupation: Chemist
- Known for: First female associate member of the Royal Institute of Chemistry

Emily Jane Lloyd (1860 – 14 November 1912) was an English chemist and one of the first women to become an Associate member of the Royal Institute of Chemistry.

== Early life and education ==
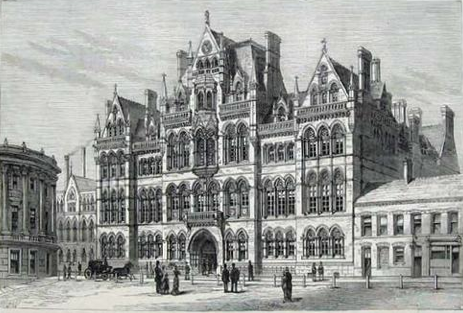
Mason Science College where she attended

She was the daughter of Martin Lloyd, a nail manufacturer in Birmingham. She attended a private school in Leamington. Later, she attended Mason Science College for a year in 1883, aged 23, and then transferred to University College, Aberystwyth. She remained at Aberystwyth until 1887. Lloyd is the only female student mentioned in the history of the chemistry department of the university. She then was awarded a B.Sc. from the University of London in 1892. During this time, she applied under the name of E.Lloyd to sit the Associateship examination of the Institute of Chemistry. Because the committee was unaware that she was a woman, she was permitted to write the paper, which she passed.

Once the Institute of Chemistry has admitted one female fellow, they could not deny any subsequent female fellows. A second swiftly followed, Lucy Everest Boole.

== Career ==
The following year she received a request as science mistress in a public school for girls at Uitenhage, Cape Colony. She taught there for 4 years and then returned to Wales and then taught at a school in Llanelly until 1909 then retired due to ill health.

== Death ==
She died on 14 November 1912, aged 52.
