= Katherine Warington =

British botanist

- Born: 5 September 1897; Harpenden, Hertfordshire, England
- Died: 3 July 1993 (aged 95); St Albans, Hertfordshire, England
- Education: Royal Holloway, University of London
- Scientific career
- Workplaces: Rothamsted Research

Katherine Warington (5 September 1897 – 3 July 1993) was a botanist and the first person to show that boron, as boric acid, was essential for the healthy growth of plants.

== Early life and education ==
Katherine Warington was born in Harpenden, Hertfordshire on 5 September 1897, a twin and one of the five daughters of Helen Louisa Makins and the agricultural chemist Robert Warington FRS [Jnr]. She was educated at the all-women Holloway College, University of London graduating with a BSc (Hons) in botany in 1921. In 1923 she gained her MSc from the University of London with her thesis: The effect of boric acid and borax on the broad bean and certain other plants.

In 1928 she studied spectrographic methods of analysis under Professor Lundegårdh at Experimentalfältet, Stockholm. Her work on boron was the basis for her D.Sc. from the University of London.

== Career ==
Katherine Warington's father had worked at Rothamsted Experimental Station. Here she began as a voluntary worker, much like visiting scientists today. She was then appointed to the Botany Department in 1921, working with Dr. Winifred Brenchley.

Warington's work with boron came about because an entomologist wanted to find a way of making bean plants distasteful to black fly (Aphis). The botanists were responsible for supplying solutions with a range of concentrations of various elements for water culture solutions. These included several elements, of which boron was one, not previously recognized as plant nutrients. Using the solutions he found that all his plants died except those given boron.

Warington's work required meticulous care as she had to maintain a boron free solution as her control throughout the life of the beans. Her test solution concentrations were as low as 5 ppm (parts per million). Everyone coming into the glasshouse had first to wash their hands even if they weren't going to handle the plants. By 1923 she had published the proof that boron was essential to the healthy growth of broad beans. Dr Hugh Nicol commented "It is not given to everyone to found a minor industry with her first piece of research, yet this, in effect, happened in her case...the agricultural consumption of boron compounds attained considerable dimension". Warington went on to produce papers on other micronutrients including molybdenum and manganese.

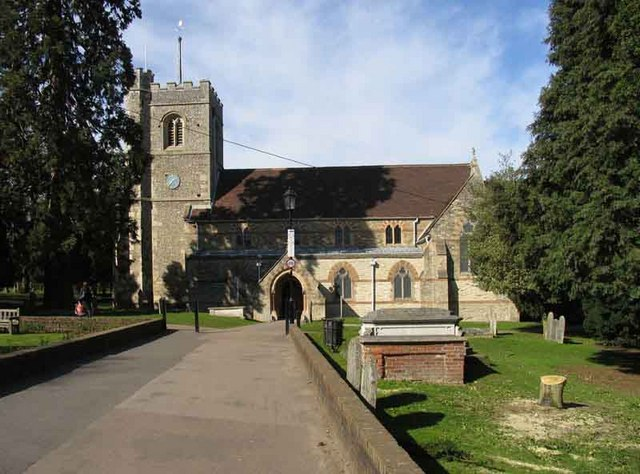
St Nicholas church in Harpenden, Hertfordshire.

Warington also worked with Brenchley on the Rothamsted Classical Experiments: Broadbalk (winter wheat study started 1843) and Park Grass (started 1856), where from 1921 they carried out field surveys of weeds. Warington tested the germination of weed seeds, demonstrating that most species had an optimal germination period during the year.

== Later life ==
Katherine Warington retired in 1957. She had an active retirement including voluntary clerical work at the St Nicholas' parish office. During her last few years she lived in a residential home in St Albans where she died on 3 July 1993 following a stroke at the age of 95. She is buried in the family plot in St Nicholas Churchyard.

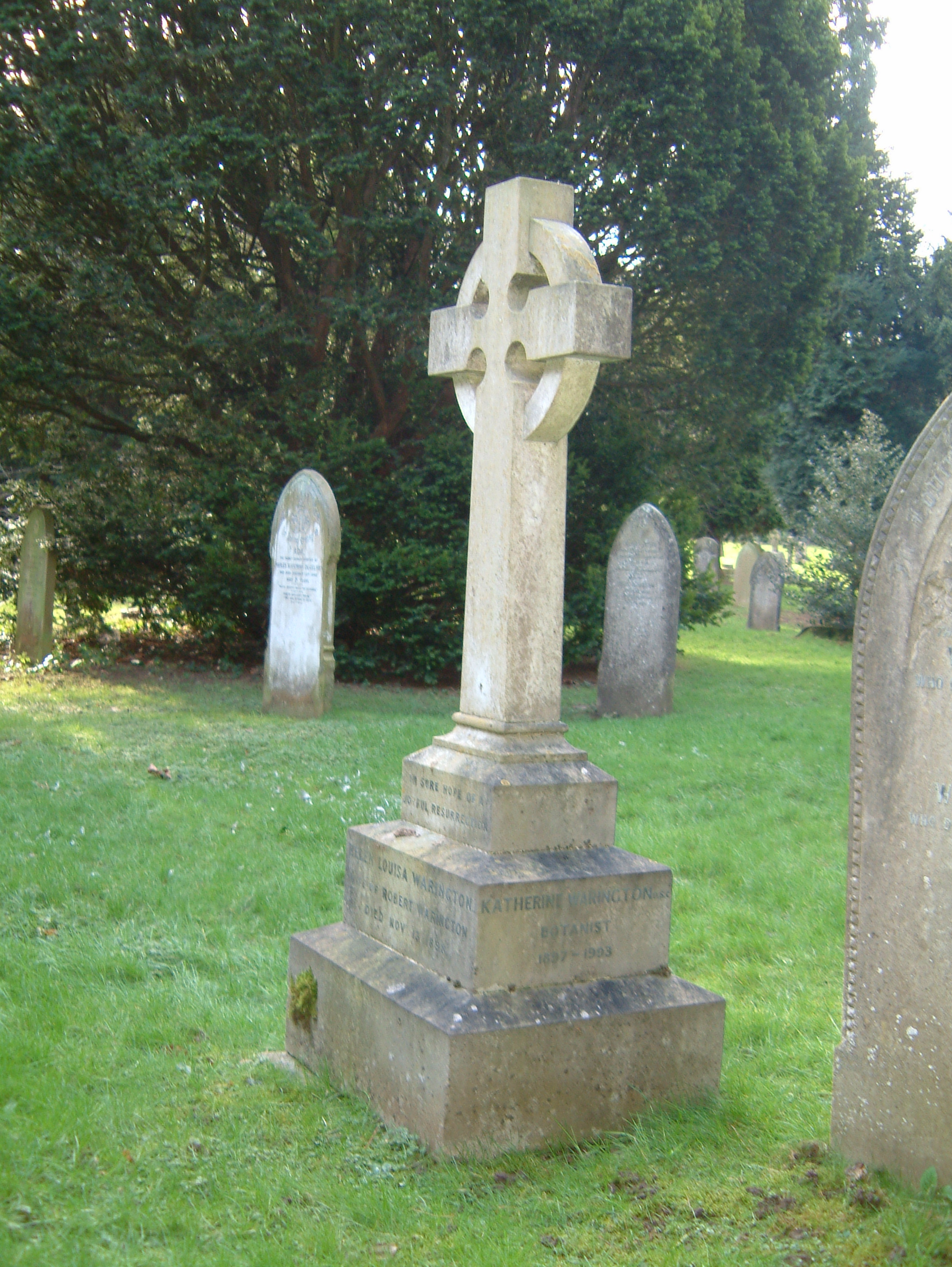
Warington Family Plot, St Nicholas Churchyard, Harpenden, England
