= St Nicholas Church, Harpenden =

Church in Hertfordshire, England

Coordinates: 51.8169°N 0.3584°W

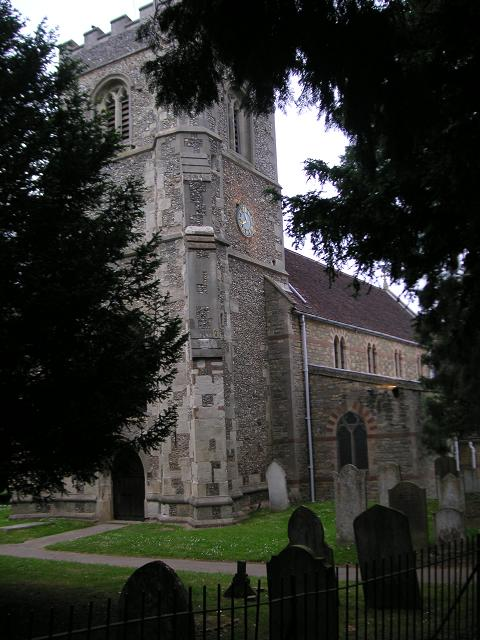
- St Nicholas Church, Harpenden
- St Nicholas Church, Harpenden
- Denomination: Church of England
- Churchmanship: Broad Church
- Website: parishofharpenden.org

History
- Dedication: St. Nicholas

Administration
- Province: Canterbury
- Diocese: St Albans
- Parish: Harpenden

Clergy
- Priest: Revd Linda Williams (from December 2010)

The church of St Nicholas in Harpenden is a parish church in the Church of England. It is a Grade II* listed building.

== Background ==
It is the oldest known church in Harpenden, Hertfordshire. It was originally built as a Chapel-of-Ease in about 1217, until it was enlarged and the existing tower added in 1470. The old church was demolished in 1861 to make way for a larger building. The tower contains a ring of eight bells, the oldest of which dates from 1612.

Harpenden remained part of the ecclesiastical parish of Wheathampstead until 1859 but was, from the Middle Ages, a separate civil parish with its own officials, who were elected annually at the Abbot's Manorial Court, held at Wheathampstead. In 1862, only three years after the long-sought separation from the parish of Wheathampstead, the church was rebuilt to accommodate the growing congregation.

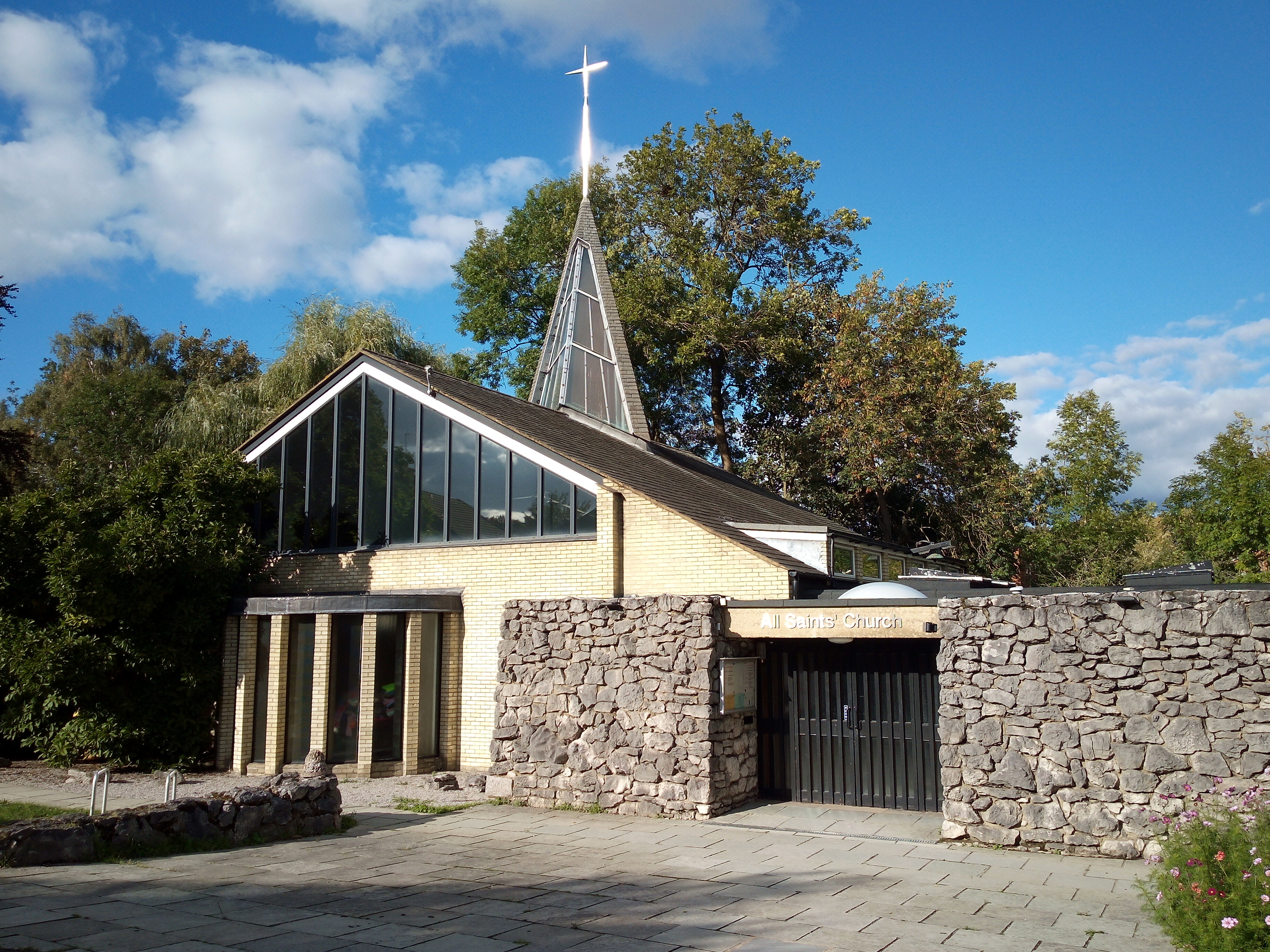
All Saints' Church, Harpenden is one of two daughter churches of St Nicholas

The church is part of the Parish of Harpenden St Nicholas, a Church of England Parish within the Diocese of St Albans. Within the parish are two daughter churches, All Saints on Station Road in the Batford district to the east of Harpenden, and St Mary's on the northern outskirts. These churches have their own District Committees (as St Nicholas does) and enjoy a degree of autonomy and distinctive styles of worship.

== Notable interments ==
- Ferdinand Walsin Esterhazy (1847–1923; spy, buried under the name of Jean de Voilemont)
- Joseph Henry Gilbert (1817–1901; chemist)
- John Bennet Lawes (1814–1900; agricultural scientist)
- Eric Morecambe (1926–1984; comedian and entertainer; ashes)
- Edward John Russell (1872–1965; agricultural scientist)
- Frank O. Salisbury (1874–1962; artist)
- Katherine Warington (1897–1993; botanist)

== See also ==
- Saint Nicholas
