= Thales (crater) =

Crater on the Moon

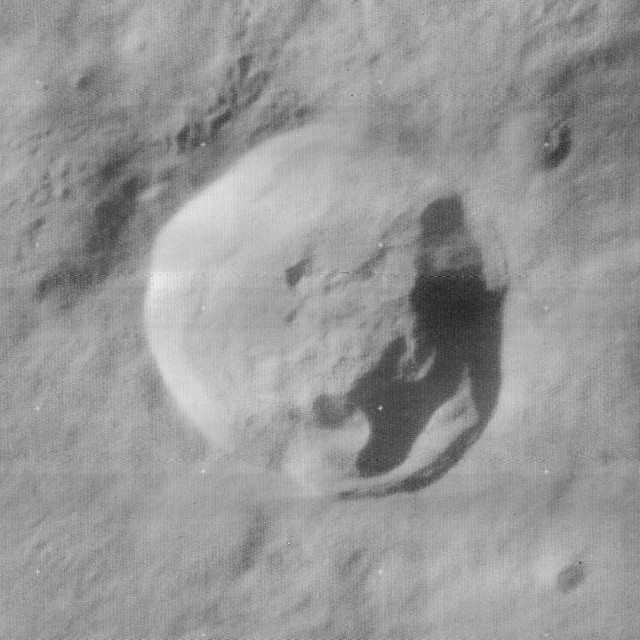
- Lunar Orbiter 4 image
- Coordinates: 61.8°N 50.3°E
- Diameter: 32 km
- Depth: 1.8 km
- Colongitude: 314° at sunrise
- Eponym: Thales

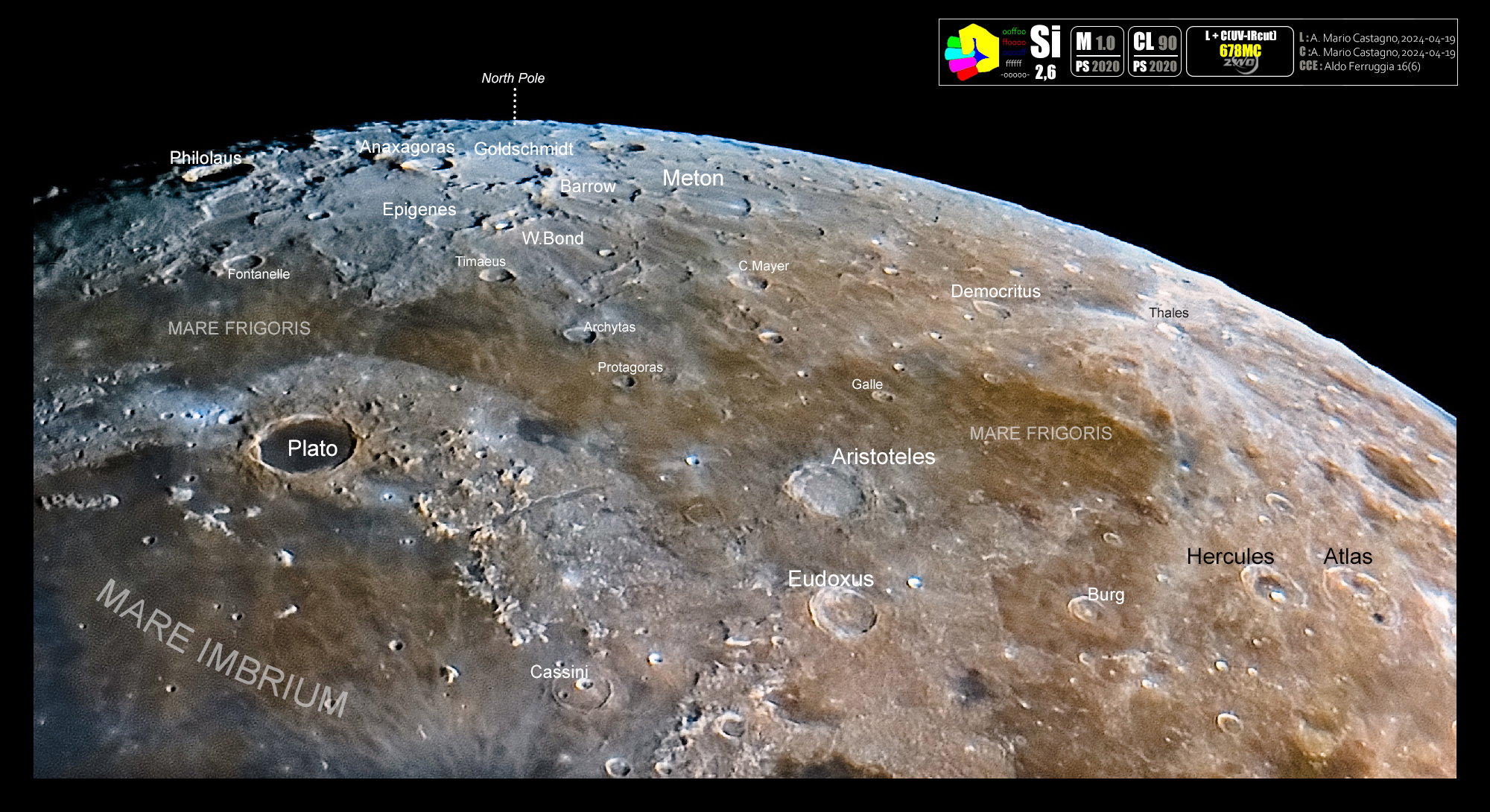
The crater at the top right of a seleochromatic image

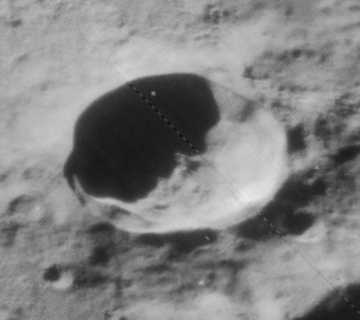
Oblique view from Lunar Orbiter 4

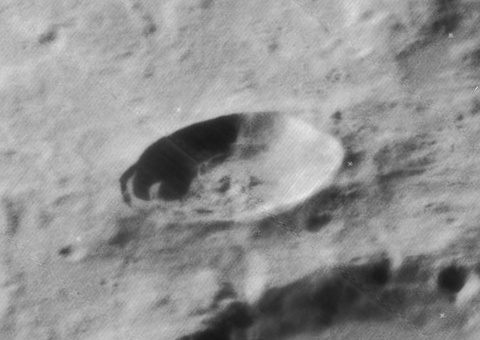
Another oblique view from Lunar Orbiter 4

Thales is a small crater located in the northeast part of the Moon, just to the west of the larger crater Strabo. To the southeast is a walled plain called De La Rue.

Thales has a sharp, circular rim that has received little erosion. The lunar surface around Thales has a ray system that extends for over 600 kilometers, and it is consequently mapped as part of the Copernican System. However, an area to the north-northwest of the crater is free of rays, indicating that the crater may have been formed by a low-angle impact from that direction. The inner wall of Thales has some terraces, particularly along the southern side. The sides have a higher albedo than the typical lunar terrain.

This crater has been noted for transient lunar phenomena. In 1892, E. E. Barnard observed a pale haze fill the crater interior, while the surroundings remained clear and sharply visible.

== Satellite craters ==
By convention these features are identified on lunar maps by placing the letter on the side of the crater midpoint that is closest to Thales.

Thales	Latitude	Longitude	Diameter
A	58.5° N	40.8° E	12 km
E	57.2° N	43.2° E	29 km
F	59.4° N	42.1° E	37 km
G	61.6° N	45.3° E	12 km
H	60.3° N	48.0° E	10 km
W	58.5° N	39.8° E	6 km
