= ASLIB Microfilm Service =

The ASLIB Microfilm Service was an organisation set up as part of the United Kingdom's Association of Special Libraries and Information Bureaux (ASLIB) to provide a microfilm copyingservice for the British and United States authorities from 1942-1945. The organisation was run by the director, Lucia Moholy, who published an account of the services activities published in 1946. At one time it has as many as 30 people working for it.

In 1941 ASLIB working in conjunction with the Royal Society and funded by the Rockefeller Foundation carried out a survey reflecting their concerns that libraries in Great Britain were not keeping up with the latest scientific and technical periodicals being published in countries controlled by Axis powers. This led to an approach to Lord Hankey, chair of the Cabinet Advisory Committee on Science, who convened a special meeting to consider the matter. This was attended by representatives several government departments such as the Department of Scientific and Industrial Research (DSIR) and the H.M. Stationery Office (HMSO) as well as both the Agricultural Research Council and Medical Research Council. The Royal Society were also in attendance. Although these deliberations did not approve the importation of additional copies, Edward Appleton was asked to find a way whereby more copies could be made of such periodicals that were already imported. Both the DSIR and HMSO had considered setting up such a service, but in the end it was decided that ASLIB should set up a unified service using microfilm.

A Standing Advisory Committee was set up to guide the project with the following membership:

- Royal Society:Edward Andrade, Dr. Edward Frankland Armstrong, Professor Vernon H. Blackman, and Dr. Cecil Henry Desch,
- Government libraries:

Agricultural Research Council: Sir David Chadwick,
Patent Office Library Mr. Arthur Allan Gomme,
Medical Research Council: Dr. F. H. K. Green
Science Library Mr. Ernest Lancaster-Jones,
DSIR: Mr. C. A. Spencer

- ASLIB, by Mr. E. J. Carter, Miss Edith Ditmas, and Dr. Robert Hutton
