= Douglas M. C. MacEwan =

Scottish physicist and x-ray crystallographer

Douglas MacLean Clark MacEwan FRSE (1917–2000) was a Scottish physicist and x-ray crystallographer.

== Life ==
He was born in Edinburgh on 20 June 1917 during the height of the First World War. He studied Science at Edinburgh University from 1933 under Dr Arnold Beevers and graduated MA BSc.

In 1941 he obtained a doctorate (PhD) from Edinburgh and took up a position as a soil engineer at the Macaulay Institute in Aberdeen. Here he began his lifelong connection with x-ray crystallography (mainly of soil and clay) and also became a lifelong friend of his colleague DR Robert MacKenzie. In 1946 he moved to Rothansted Experimental Station in Hertfordshire under Sir William Gammie Ogg. In 1947 he founded the Clay Minerals Group.

In 1954 he left Britain to work in Spain to work with Dr Juan Vivaldi on clay research in Granada. Here he worked with Vivaldi Girela Vilchez, Cano Ruiz and Rausell Colon on clay minerals. MacEwan loved the lifestyle in Spain and considered it the happiest time of his life.

In 1959 he returned to Britain as senior lecturer in physics at the Queen's College, Dundee, which later became the University of Dundee, but which was then part of the University of St Andrews. In 1960 he was elected a Fellow of the Royal Society of Edinburgh. His proposers were Sir William Gammie Ogg, George Dawson Preston, Arnold Beevers, Alexander B. Stewart and James Paton.

Pining for Spain, he returned there in 1964 as a researcher in the Chemistry Department of the University of Madrid under Prof Enrique Gutierrez Rios. In 1967 his wanderlust continued and he moved with his family to County Waterford in southern Ireland to set up his own printing company: Volturna Press.

He died on 12 March 2000 in Hythe in Kent.
