= Grisdale =

Grisdale is a surname. Notable people with the surname include:

- Frank Grisdale (1887–1976), politician from Alberta, Canada
- John Grisdale (born 1948), Canadian professional ice hockey player
- John Grisdale (bishop) (1845–1922), Anglican colonial bishop
- Joseph Grisdale (1870–1939), Canadian agriculturist
