= Lucia Moholy =

Austrian-born photographer and editor (1894–1989)

- Self-portrait (1930)
- Born: Lucia Schulz; 18 January 1894; Prague, Austria-Hungary
- Died: 17 May 1989 (aged 95); Zürich, Switzerland
- Known for: Photography
- Movement: Bauhaus
- Spouse: László Moholy-Nagy (m. 1921; div. 1934)

Lucia Moholy (née Schulz; 18 January 1894 — 17 May 1989) was a photographer and publications editor. Her photos documented the architecture and products of the Bauhaus, and introduced their ideas to a post-World War II audience. However, Moholy was seldom credited for her work, which was often attributed to her husband László Moholy-Nagy or to Walter Gropius.

== Early years and education ==
Schulz grew up in a nonpracticing Jewish family in a "German-speaking enclave" of Prague, where her father had his law practice, in the Austrian part of Austria-Hungary. Her own diaries from that period, include a drawing from 10 May 1907 of gifts her father brought back to her, her brother Franz, mother and grandmother from his trips. Through these diaries written in her teen years, we know she corresponded with pen pals in the United States in English, and read Thomas Mann and Leo Tolstoy. As tensions rose in 1914 and the events that led to World War I, then twenty-year old Schulz, who may have been working in her father's law offices at the time, made donations "for the families of the Austrian war".

After qualifying as a German and English teacher in 1912, Schulz studied philosophy, philology, and art history at the University of Prague.

== Early career ==
In the early years of World War I, Schulz began to work in Wiesbaden, Germany, as theater critic for a local newspaper. Shortly after, Schulz moved to Leipzig. In Berlin, she worked for publishing houses, such as Hyperion, Kurt Wolff, among others, where she was an editor and copy editor.

In 1919 she published radical, Expressionist literature under the pseudonym "Ulrich Steffen".

== Personal life ==
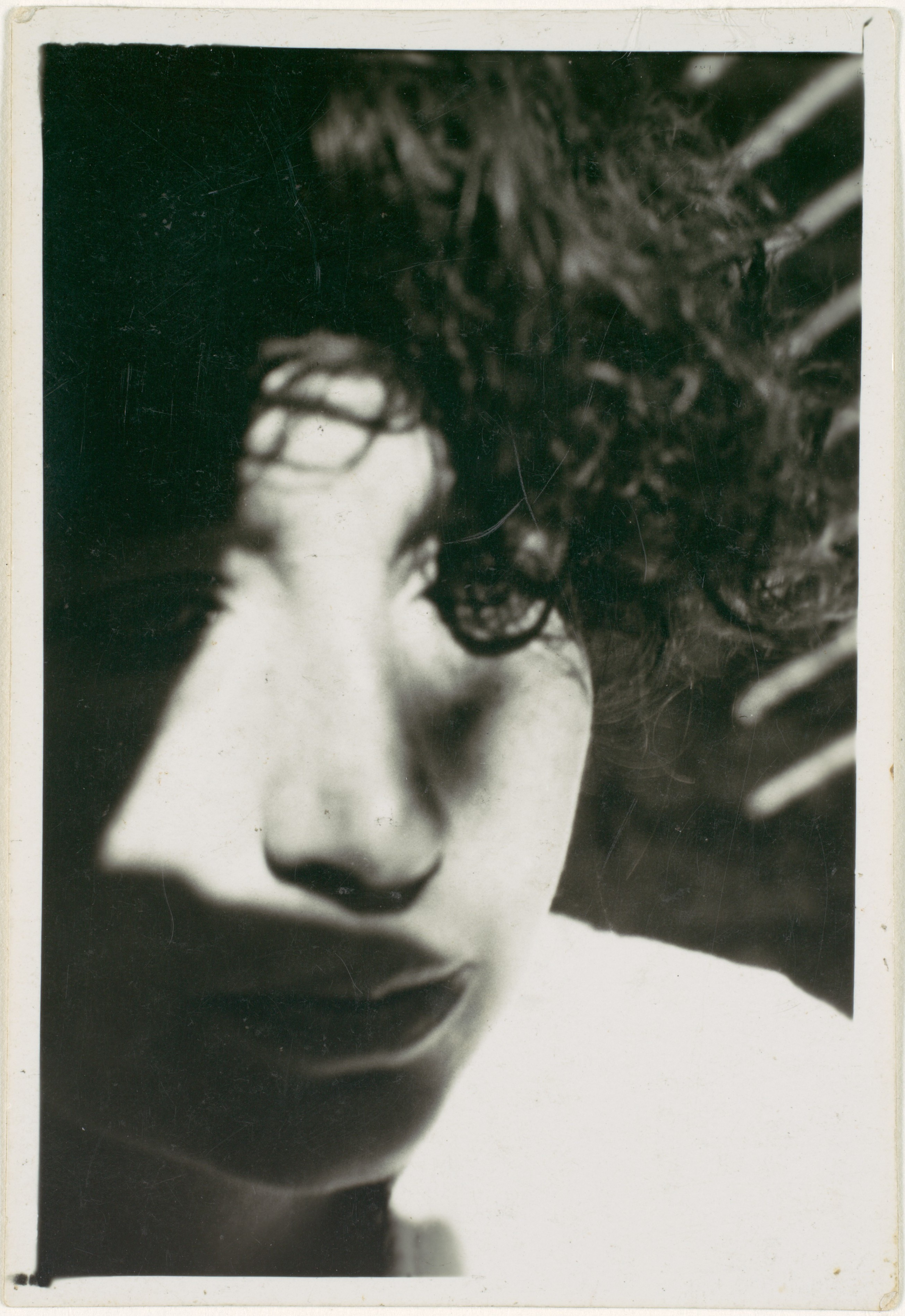
Photo of Lucia Moholy, created by László Moholy-Nagy about 1924-1928

In Berlin in April 1920, Schulz met László Moholy-Nagy (1895–1946), a recent émigré from Hungary. They were married on 21 January 1921, her 27th birthday. Following her marriage to Moholy-Nagy in 1921, Moholy, who worked with publishing houses, provided the only salary for the couple. During the years the couple lived in Dessau, Germany, on the Bauhaus school campus, Moholy's diaries describe her sense of discontent in Dessau, her feelings of estrangement and her longing for the city. She described how groups of twenty arrived for short periods, partied and left. Moholy-Nagy was not sympathetic to her feelings. They separated in 1929, a year after they left Dessau, though their divorce would not be finalized until 1934.

In 1933, the Nazi Party rose to power. Moholy was in a relationship with a communist Member of Parliament, Theodor Neubauer, who was arrested in her apartment one day while she was out. She abruptly left Berlin, leaving all of her belongings including the bulky glass negatives of her Bauhaus photographs, which ended up in the hands of Walter Gropius. After having lived in Germany for two decades, she was forced to flee to Prague where she stayed with her family. She then went to Switzerland, Austria, Paris, before settling in London in June 1934.

After World War II ended, Moholy started a campaign to emigrate to the United States. Documentation for the application included a letter from her brother, Franz, who had a successful career, a good income and had offered to support her. Moholy-Nagy provided her with an offer of a position as photography professor in Chicago. Her application for a "nonquota visa as a professor" was denied in 1940, on the "grounds that she lacked experience teaching".

== Bauhaus years (1923–1928) ==
Georg Muche (1926, gelatin silver print)

In 1923, Walter Gropius, who had founded the Bauhaus school in 1919 in Weimar, Germany, hired Moholy-Nagy as a teacher. In 1926, she and her husband moved into one of the Bauhaus staff residences called Meisterhäuser—Masters' Houses—on the school's new campus in Dessau, Germany.

During those five years, Moholy documented the interior and exterior of Bauhaus architecture and its facilities in Weimar and Dessau, as well as the students and teachers. Her aesthetic was part of the Neue Sachlichkeit (New Objectivity) movement, which focused on documentation from a straightforward perspective. Moholy's Bauhaus photographs helped construct the identity of the school and create its image. She was a skilled photographer through her studies at the Leipzig Academy for Graphic and Book Arts (Hochschule für Grafik und Buchkunst Leipzig) At Bauhaus, she also apprenticed in Otto Eckner’s photography studio.

Moholy and Moholy-Nagy experimented with different processes in the darkroom, such as making photograms.

In 1925, the book Malerei, Photografie, Film (1925; Painting, Photography, Film) was published only under Moholy-Nagy's name, even though she had contributed to all of the experimentation. This lack of recognition was evident in numerous publications.

In 1938, while Moholy lived in London, Walter Gropius used about fifty of Moholy’s images from the Bauhaus years—from her negatives that he still had in his possession—in the Museum of Modern Art (MoMA) exhibition and the accompanying catalogue, without giving her any credit.

Lucia Moholy struggled to receive recognition for her work. Her images were widely used for marketing and in the Bauhaus school’s sales catalogs, as well as Bauhaus-published books that she edited. An interest in the Bauhaus started to grow in the late 1930s, and she saw numerous catalogs of the Bauhaus printed with her lost images. Gropius had been using her photographs without crediting her. She repeatedly reached out to Gropius to reclaim her images and he would continuously protest. Moholy resorted to hiring a lawyer to retrieve her work.

Some relevant letters between Walter Gropius and Lucia Moholy are displayed on the website 99% Invisible. Moholy stated, "These negatives are irreplaceable documents which could be extremely useful, now more than ever" to which Gropius replied, "[...]long years ago in Berlin, you gave all these negatives to me. You will imagine that these photographs are extremely useful to me and that I have continuously made use of them; so I hope you will not deprive me of them." Lucia Moholy responded, "Surely you did not expect me to delay my departure in order to draw up a formal contract stipulating date and conditions of return? No formal agreement could have carried more weight than our friendship. It is a friendship I have always relied on, and which, also, I am now invoking."

Moholy did not get physical possession of her original material until 1957, but even then she only could recover a portion of them, 230 out of the 560 Bauhaus-era negatives she took, while 330 negatives, according to Moholy's own card catalogue, are still missing. Her 1972 publication, Moholy-Nagy Notes, was an attempt to reclaim credit for her work that was printed without permission. After her death, the collection of negatives was donated to the Bauhaus Archive in Berlin.

== London (1933–1959) and Switzerland (1959–1989) ==
Lucia Moholy arrived in London in June 1934 and established her home and studio at 39 Mecklenburgh Square. There she befriended members of the wider "Bloomsbury Set", who supported her work by commissioning portraits and inviting her to give lectures. Among her portrait subjects from this period were scientists such as Patrick Blackett and Michael Polanyi, prominent Quakers such as Ruth Fry and Hilda Schuster (grandmother of Stephen Spender), and writers such as Margaret Leland Goldsmith, Inez Pearn/ Spender and Ernest Rhys. She also wrote a book in English, A Hundred Years of Photography, 1839-1939, which was published in 1939 by Penguin Books, under their Pelican Special imprint. The book sold 40,000 copies, but no further editions were published due to paper shortages.

During WWII, Moholy became involved in working in microfilm, through connections with Eugene Power of University Microfilms International who organized the microfilming of documents for the US office of the Coordinator of Information. She was appointed director of the ASLIB Microfilm Service (AMS), at the Science Museum, London, as part of the Association of Special Libraries and Information Bureaux (ASLIB). The service moved to the Victoria and Albert Museum in April 1943, where it remained for the next three years, sponsored by the British and US governments and the Rockefeller Foundation. Much of the team's work was highly secretive, and involved the copying of scientific and technical publications and papers using Kodak's Recordak Microfile cameras.

Photographs attributed to Lucia Moholy are held in the Conway Library at The Courtauld Institute of Art whose archive, of primarily architectural images, is being digitised under the wider Courtauld Connects project. Many of the portraits she made while in Britain are held at the National Portrait Gallery in London, and in the Bauhaus Archive, Berlin.

From 1946 to 1957, immediately after World War II, she traveled to the Near and Middle East where she did microfilm projects for UNESCO, and directed documentary films.

In 1959, she moved to Zollikon, Switzerland, where she wrote about her time at the Bauhaus, and focused on art criticism.

== Exhibitions and publications ==
In 1925, Lucia Moholy was included in the landmark exhibition in Stuttgart, Film and Foto. It featured artists working in the New Vision aesthetic (Precisionism) and New Objectivity or Neue Sachlichkeit photographers such as Moholy.

Her studies of the novelist Inez Pearn are held at the National Portrait Gallery, one of which formed part of the Bauhaus In Britain exhibition at the Tate Britain (2019).

In her book, A Hundred Years of Photography, 1839-1939, she discussed in depth the history of the medium. The more well-known photography historian Helmut Gernsheim, credited his interest in the history of photography to Moholy's book. The book was reviewed by Beaumont Newhall in 1941, who complained that it did not give enough account of stylistic changes in photography: Newhall wanted to give photography its own history, distinct from the wider histories of art and technology, but Moholy situated photography within these larger contexts, emphasising the mutual dependence of different media and practices.

In her 1972 publication, entitled Moholy-Nagy Notes , she included the shared collaboration between herself and László Moholy-Nagy at the Bauhaus, in an attempt to reclaim artistic credit for her photographs and experimentation.

== See also ==
- Women of the Bauhaus
- László Moholy-Nagy (1895–1946)
- Walter Gropius (1883–1969)
- Florence Henri (1893–1982)
- Georg Muche (1895–1987)
- Franz Roh (1890–1965)
- Marianne Brandt (1893–1983)
- Gunta Stölzl (1897–1983)
- Otti Berger (1898-1944/45)
- Grete Stern (1904–1999)
- Bauhaus (1919–1933)

== Podcast ==
Anja Guttenberger: Podcast about life and work of Lucia Moholy with Robin Schuldenfrei, bauhaus faces, host: Dr. Anja Guttenberger, published on 23 Sep, 2024
