= Iranian Research Institute for Information Science and Technology =

Iranian research center

- پژوهشگاه علوم و فناوری اطلاعات ایران
- Type: Public
- Established: 1968
- President: Mohammad Hasanzadeh
- Location: Tehran, Tehran, Iran
- Website: en.irandoc.ac.ir

Iranian Research Institute for Information Science and Technology (IRANDOC) (previously known as Iranian Research Institute for Scientific Information and Documentation) is an Iranian research center with a national mission to meet the country's needs in the field of information science and technology

== Faculties ==
The institute has three faculties:

- Faculty of Information Technology
- Faculty of Information Sciences
- Faculty of Information & Society

== History ==
The institute was established in 1968 as the governmental organization known as Iranian Documentation Centre to "bring modern information to scientists and professors". In March 1969 IRANDOC became part of the Ministry of Science and Higher Education's new Institute for Research and Planning in Science and Education, along with Center for Scientific Policy, Center for Educational Planning and the Center for Library Services. In 1970 it had a staff of 60 personnel, with 30 being college graduates, and seven had doctorates. When the Institute was disestablished in 1983, IRANDOC continued under the supervision of the Deputy Minister Office for Research.

A revised charter was approved by the Council for Development of Higher Education in 1991, changing its status to a research center and its name changed to its present form.

IRANDOC is a national member of International Federation of Library Associations and Institutions (IFLA) and Association for Information Management (ASLIB).

== Publications ==
- Contents Pages, providing the table of contents of journals published in Iran.
- Abstracts Bulletin
- Union List of Social Science Periodicals
- Directory of Iranian Newspapers, covering publishers with licenses by the Ministry of Information.
- Directory of Iranian Periodicals, previously published by the Department of Library Science, University of Tehran. In 1970 it included 244 periodials, and was published in Persian and English.
- A Bibliography of Persian Law Books
- Directory of Iranian Libraries
- Iranian Scholars and Experts Database (1996–)
- Information Sciences and Technology (1972–), originally IRANDOC Technical Journal
- Iranian Dissertation Abstracts (1973–)
- Dissertations abstracts of Iranian graduates abroad (1995–)
- Current Research in Iranian universities and research centers (1993–)
- Abstracts of Scientific-Technical Papers (1993–)
- Directory of Scientific Meetings held in Iran (1993–)
- Khazar Information Quarterly (1993–?)
- Educational Information Quarterly (1994–?)
