= Imperial Agricultural Bureaux =

The Imperial Agricultural Bureaux was an initiative taken by the Governments of the British Commonwealth who agreed to jointly fund a number of bureaux "to collect, collate and disseminate information on research in eight selected branches of agricultural science". On 1 April 1929 an Executive Council was created, which proceed to set up the eight Bureaux. The principal role of help research workers in the British Empire to keep abreast of their subjects. This was achieved by

- circulating regular bulletins and journals containing abstracts focussing on updates in specific areas
- providing information needed on specific points, with the corollary that the workers themselves must be aware of the existence of the

bureaux and have sufficient confidence in them to ask for this information

- by co-ordinating meet-ups of research workers whenever this attracted sufficient participants
- offering advice or accommodation to meet the needs of researchers

Following recommendations from the British Commonwealth Scientific Official Conference, 1946, the Imperial Agricultural Bureaux was transformed into the Commonwealth Agricultural Bureaux (CAB).

== Membership of Executive Council ==
The initial members of the council were:

- Robert Blyth Greig, (chairman)Scotland
- Frank Lidgett McDougall, Australia
- Charles John Howell Thomas, England and Wales
- G. Scott Robertson, Northern Ireland
- J. H. Grisdale, Canada
- John Gorst Hubball, South Africa
- Nevill L. Wright, New Zealand
- J. L. Hinchcliffe, Irish Free State
- David Clouston, India
- B. F. Wright, Southern Rhodesia
- Roland Venables Vernon, Colonies, Protectorates and Mandated Territories

The secretary was Sir David Chadwick

== The individual bureaux and other bodies ==
Initially there were eight bureaux:

- Imperial Bureau of Soil Science, founded in 1929, based at Rothamsted Experimental Station
- Imperial Bureau of Animal Nutrition, based at Rowett Research Institute, Aberdeen
- Imperial Bureau of Animal Health, based at the Veterinary Laboratory, Weybridge
- Imperial Bureau of Animal Genetics, based at the Animal Breeding Research Department, Edinburgh University
- Imperial Bureau of Agricultural Parasitology, based at Winches Farm, St Albans
- Imperial Bureau of Plant Genetics, based at the School of Agriculture, Cambridge
- Imperial Bureau of Plant Breeding (Herbage Plants) , based at the Welsh Plant Breeding Station, Aberystwyth
- Imperial Bureau of Fruit Production, based at East Malling Research Centre, Kent

Also the International Mycological Institute was included in their remit.
