= CAB Direct =

Database of bibliographic records in the life sciences

CAB Abstracts
- Producer: CABI (United Kingdom)
- History: 1973–present
- Languages: Fifty languages, English abstracts

Access
- Providers: CABI Digital Library (CABI's own platform), Datastar, Dialog bluesheets, STN International, Thomson-Reuters Web of Knowledge, EBSCO, OvidSP, Dimdi

Coverage
- Disciplines: applied life sciences - agriculture, environment, veterinary sciences, applied economics, food science and nutrition
- Record depth: bibliographic, abstracting and indexing
- Format coverage: journal articles, abstracts, proceedings, books, book chapters, monographs, annual reports, handbooks, bulletins, newsletters, discussion papers, field notes, technical information, thesis papers
- Temporal coverage: 1973–present
- Geospatial coverage: Global - international
- No. of records: 11 million +

Links
- Website: www.cabidigitallibrary.org/product/ca
- Title list(s): www.cabi.org/default.aspx?site=170&page=1028

Global Health
- Producer: CABI
- Languages: 50 languages (158 countries)

Access
- Providers: CAB Direct, SilverPlatter, Web of Knowledge, EBSCO, OvidSP, Dialog, Dimdi

Coverage
- Disciplines: international health research (medical and public)
- Record depth: bibliographic, abstracting and indexing
- Format coverage: scientific journals, reports, books and conferences
- Temporal coverage: 1973 to present
- Geospatial coverage: global-international
- No. of records: 4+ million scientific records

Links
- Website: https://www.cabidigitallibrary.org/product/he

CAB Direct is a source of references for the applied life sciences It incorporates two bibliographic databases: CAB Abstracts and Global Health. CAB Direct is an access point for multiple bibliographic databases produced by CABI. This database contains over 11 million bibliographic records, which includes 746,000 full text articles. It also includes noteworthy literature reviews. News articles and reports are also part of this combined database. CAB Direct has now migrated to CABI's new platform CABI Digital Library - the new home of CABI's research content.

In the U.K., in 1947, the Imperial Agricultural Bureaux became the Commonwealth Agricultural Bureaux or CAB. In 1986 the Commonwealth Agricultural Bureaux became CAB International or CABI.

== CAB Abstracts ==
CAB Abstracts is an applied life sciences bibliographic database emphasizing agricultural literature, which is international in scope. It contains over 11 million records, with coverage from 1973 to present day, adding around 360,000 abstracts per year. Subject coverage includes agriculture, environment, veterinary sciences, applied economics, food science and nutrition. Database covers international issues in agriculture, forestry, and allied disciplines in the life sciences. Indexed publications are from 120 countries in 50 languages, including English abstracts for most articles. Literature coverage includes journals, proceedings, books, and a large collection of agricultural serials. Other non-journal formats are also indexed.

=== CAB Abstracts Archive ===
CAB Abstracts Archive is a searchable database produced by CABI. It is created from 600 volumes of printed abstracts, which are the collected and published scientific research from 1913 to 1972, and then digitized to form the archive. This archive database contains more than 1.8 million records which covers agriculture, veterinary science, nutrition and the environment. Subject coverage also includes biodiversity, pest control, environmental pollution, animal disease (including zoonotic diseases), nutrition, and food production. Natural resource management includes plant and animal breeding. CAB Abstracts Archive is also indexed in other databases, which also serve as access points. These other databases are CAB Direct, Web of Knowledge, EBSCOhost, OvidSP, and Dialog.

The following print journals (digitized) comprise CAB Abstracts Archive:

Animal Breeding Abstracts, Dairy Science Abstracts, Field Crop Abstracts,
Forestry Abstracts, Horticultural Science Abstracts, Nematological Abstracts,
Nutrition Abstracts and Reviews Series A: Human and Experimental,
Nutrition Abstracts and Reviews Series B: Livestock Feeds and Feeding,
Plant Breeding Abstracts, Review of Agricultural Entomology,
Review of Medical and Veterinary Mycology, Review of Plant Pathology,
Review of Medical and Veterinary Entomology, Review of Plant Pathology,
Soils and Fertilizers, Tropical Veterinary Bulletin, Veterinary Bulletin
and Weed Abstracts.

=== Weed Abstracts ===
Weed Abstracts, derived from CAB Abstracts, is an abstracts database focused on published research regarding weeds and herbicides. This includes weed biology, encompassing research areas from genetics to ecology, including parasitic, poisonous, allergenic and aquatic weeds. Further coverage includes all topics related to weed control, in both crop and non-crop situations. Research on herbicides, includes formulations, herbicide resistance and the effects of herbicide residues in the environment. 10,000 records are add to this database per year.

Weed Abstracts is updated weekly with summaries from notable English and foreign language journal articles, reports, conferences and books about weeds and herbicides. With the back-file, coverage is from 1990 to present day bringing the total of available research summaries to 130,000 records.

== Global Health database ==
Global Health is a bibliographic database which focuses on research literature in public health and medical health science sectors (including practice). Information (see infobox above) in indexed in more than 7000 academic journals, and indexed from other sources such as reports, books and conferences. Global Health contains over 4 million scientific records from 1973 to the present, with an addition of 90,000 indexed and abstracted records per year. Sources are abstracted from publications in 158 countries written in 50 languages. Any relevant non-English-language papers are translated into English. Proceedings, patents, thesis papers, electronic publications and relevant but difficult-to-find literature sources are also part of this database.

=== Global Health Archive ===
Global Health Archive is a searchable database produced by CABI. It is created from 800,000 records, from six printed abstract journals, which are collected published scientific research from 1910 to 1972, digitized to form the archive. Global Health Archive is also indexed in other databases, which also serve as access points. These other databases are CAB Direct, Web of Knowledge, EBSCOhost, OvidSP, and Dialog.

When combined with the Global Health database indexing coverage can be from 1910 to present day. Hence, coverage is made up of past epidemics, from rates and patterns of disease transmission, duration of pandemics, timing of epidemiological peaks, geographic distribution of diseases, and government preparedness and quarantine provisions. The following can also be taken into account: effects on different age and social groups, severity in developing vs. developed countries, symptoms, causes of mortality - such as secondary problems like pneumonia - and mortality rates.

==== Journal and topic coverage ====
Records for this database are derived from the following journals throughout certain years:

Tropical Diseases Bulletin (1912–83),
Abstracts on Hygiene and Communicable Diseases (1926–83),
Review of Veterinary and Medical Entomology (1913–72),
Review of Veterinary and Medical Mycology (1943–72)
Nutrition Abstracts and Reviews (1931–72), and Helminthological Abstracts (1932–72).

Subject coverage includes Public health, Tropical and Communicable diseases, Nutrition, Parasitology, Entomology, and Mycology.

=== Tropical Diseases Bulletin ===
Tropical Diseases Bulletin is a bibliographic and abstracts database which focuses on research published regarding infectious diseases and public health in developing countries and the tropics and subtropics. This includes research areas from epidemiology to diagnosis, therapy to disease prevention, tropical medicine, and related aspects of travel medicine. Published research coverage on patients and populations encompasses the health of marginalized populations: immigrants, refugees, and indigenous peoples.

Back-file coverage is from 1990 to present day, with an accessible base of 195,000 abstracts and the addition of 11,000 records per year. As a monthly journal Tropical Diseases Bulletin is also available in print. This print journal has author, subject and serials cited indexes. Coverage of the print back-file is to 1912. A searchable, electronic database version of this journal is part of the Global Health Archive (see above).

== Organic Research Database ==
This indexing database focuses on scientific literature pertaining to all topics in organic farming, in both the temperate and tropical zones. This includes sustainability issues and soil fertility. Coverage is global; literature is obtained from 125 countries. The temporal coverage spans 30 years, 180,000 organic research abstracts, along with the addition of 8000 records per year. Linking to full text articles, guided searches, broad subject categorization along with subject refinement are also provided. The editorial advisory board of this database also commission reviews pertaining to organic farming.

== CABI full text repository ==
CABI full text repository is integrated into all CABI databases including CAB Abstracts, and Global Health. Both of these are online and print journals. Coverage includes 770,000 full text articles, through agreements with third party publishers. Eighty percent of the content is exclusive to CABI.

The full text repository is made up of fifty percent journal articles, and equal percentage of conference (proceeding) papers, and other accessible literature is also included. Eighty percent of the articles are in English and coverage includes 56 countries. Also included in this database are relevant but hard to find materials which crosses disciplines consisting of agriculture, health and the life sciences. Mainstream literature and hard to find materials of equal relevance are given equal access.

CABI full text repository is indexed in other databases, which also serve as access points, consisting of Web of Knowledge (Thomson Reuters), CAB Direct, OvidSP, Dialog, Dimdi, and EBSCOhost.

== See also ==
- Google Scholar
- List of academic databases and search engines
- Lists of academic journals
- List of open-access journals
- List of scientific journals
