= Imperial Bureau of Soil Science =

The Imperial Bureau of Soil Science was founded in May 1929 to support researchers in soil science throughout the British Empire. It was proposed to do so through:

- providing technical information
- promoting personal contacts between these researcher.

From the outset the newly formed organisation was closely linked to the Rothamsted Experimental Station, Harpenden. This provided the venue for the first conference organised by the new body, the Conference on Soil Science Problems, 16–18 September 1930. The Bureau had both a distinct administration and financial budget, however the Director of the station was ex-officio Consultant Director of the Soil Bureau. It came under the auspices of the Imperial Agricultural Bureaux.

== Consultant Directors ==
- E. John Russell (1929–1943)
- William Gammie Ogg (1943–1958)
- Frederick Charles Bawden (1958–1972)
