= Jacqui Cole =

Chemist

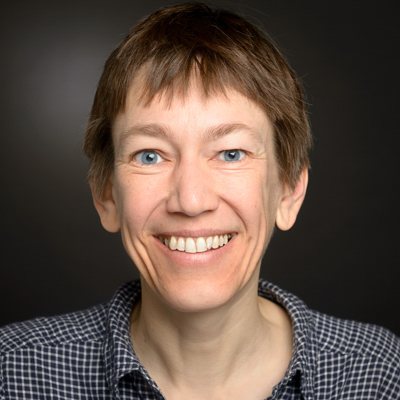
- Jacqui Cole at Argonne National Laboratory in 2015
- Born: Jacqueline Manina Cole
- Education: Durham University (BSc, PhD); University of Cambridge (PhD); Open University (BSc, BEng, PGDip, PGDip, PGDip)
- Awards: Royal Society University Research Fellowship (2001)
- Scientific career
- Fields: Molecular engineering Dye-sensitized solar cells Non linear optical materials Photoisomerism; Optomechanical transduction
- Workplaces: University of Cambridge; University of Kent
- Thesis: Structural studies of organic and organometallic compounds using x-ray and neutron techniques (1997)
- Doctoral advisor: Judith Howard
- Website: www.ai4mat.phy.cam.ac.uk

Jacqueline Manina Cole is the Head of the Molecular Engineering group in the Cavendish Laboratory at the University of Cambridge. Her research considers the design of functional materials for optoelectronic applications.

== Early life and education ==
Cole earned her first degree in chemistry at Durham University in 1994. She remained there for her graduate studies, completing a PhD in 1997 (Grey College). Her thesis, Structural studies of organic and organometallic compounds using x-ray and neutron techniques, described the structure-property relationships of non-linear optical materials, including studies of transition metal complexes. She was supervised by Judith Howard.

Cole was appointed a postdoctoral research associate at the University of Kent, where she worked on the structure of amorphous materials. Cole moved to the University of Cambridge as a Junior Research Fellow in St Catharine's College, Cambridge in 2001. Here she began to investigate photo-crystallography. In her spare time, Cole completed a bachelor's degree in mathematics at the Open University. After the bachelor's degree in mathematics, Cole earned diplomas in statistics (2004), physics (2008) and astronomy (2006) as well as a second bachelor's degree in engineering (2014) from the Open University. Cole earned a second doctorate in physics at the University of Cambridge in 2010.

== Career and research ==
As a Royal Society University Research Fellow, Cole developed a new analytical approach to establish the photo-induced structures of optoelectronic materials. Photo-crystallography permits the 4D structural determination of photo-activated states. Photo-activation can result in structural changes that are irreversible, reversible, long-lived (microsecond lifetimes) and very short-lived (nanosecond lifetimes). Cole uses single-crystal X-ray crystallography to monitor the minute structural changes that occur during photo-excitation. Photo-crystallography allows the visualisation of switching processes in single crystals. In 2008 she was appointed Vice-Chancellor's Research Chair at the University of New Brunswick.

Cole is interested in dye-sensitized solar cells, nonlinear optics and optical data storage. In dye-sensitized solar cells, the dye absorbs sunlight, injecting electrons into titanium dioxide nanoparticles and starting an electric circuit. Cole worked on the design of organic fluorophores in an effort to improve the performance of the dye. She investigated how data mining and Quantum chemical calculations could be used to predict which dyes might perform best. She uses the EPSRC National Service for Computational Chemistry Software. She has looked to use some of the dyes, in particular p-phenylene, as a laser.

Whilst inorganic materials dominate the photonic device industry, the need for high-speed telecommunications has exceed their limitations. Organic electronic materials have a significantly faster response time. Whilst working at the Argonne National Laboratory, Cole used in situ neutron reflectometry to study the interaction between the electrolytes and electrodes in dye-sensitized solar cells. She designed cells that used metal-free organic dyes and achieve a 14.3% efficiency. The cells incorporated an organic sensitiser, MK-44, and an organic dye, MK-2, based on thiophenylcyanoacrylate. Cole optimised the anchoring characteristics of the dye on titanium dioxide nanoparticles to improve charge-transfer pathways.

Her early work considered how molecular structure impacted second-harmonic generation. Cole studied the origins of the nonlinear optics observed in N-methylurea, where solid-state intermolecular interactions and electron-donation from the methyl group separate it from the reference material urea. She has investigated the molecular design rules of organometallic second-harmonic generation active materials.

In 2018 Cole was appointed a Royal Academy of Engineering Senior Research Fellow. The fellowship is a collaboration between the Science and Technology Facilities Council (STFC), BASF and ISIS neutron source to discover functional materials systematically. As of 2019, Cole leads the Molecular Engineering group in the Cavendish Laboratory. She works with the Rutherford Appleton Laboratory on data science and buried interfaces. She has recently designed new databases of magnetic materials.

In 2025, Cole was appointed as the lead for AI in Materials Discovery, Characterisation and Application by the Henry Royce Institute.

=== Awards and honours ===
- 2000 British Crystallographic Association Chemical Crystallography Prize
- 2001 Royal Society University Research Fellowship
- 2009 Royal Society of Chemistry SAC Silver Medal
- 2020 Royal Society Clifford Paterson Medal and Lecture
