= F. M. L. Sheffield =

English botanist (1904–1973)

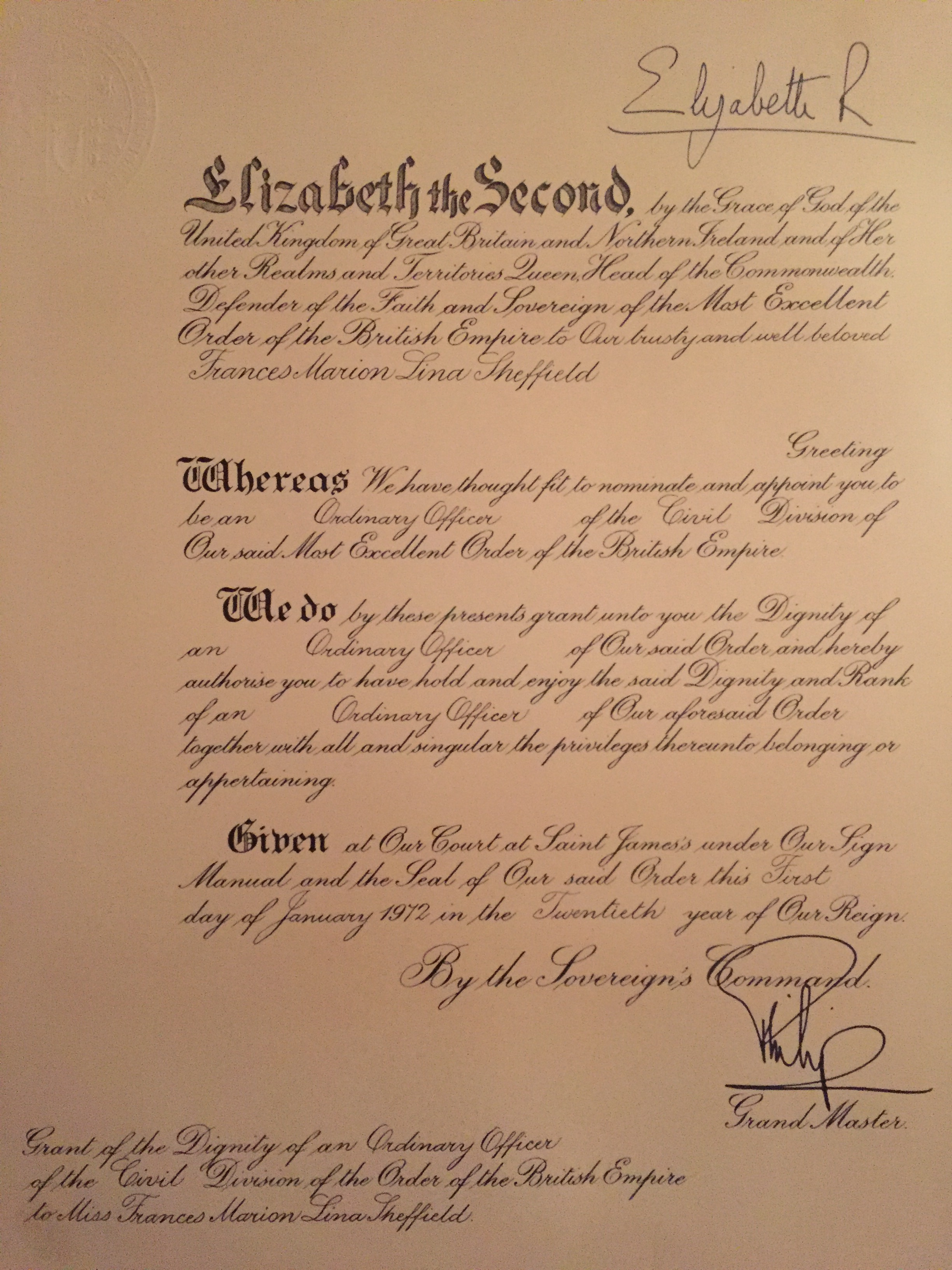
Dr Sheffield's OBE

Frances Marion Lina Sheffield OBE (3 February 1904 – 12 May 1973) was an English botanist.

== Biography ==
Sheffield was born in Hastings, Sussex, England. She studied Botany at King's College London.

She specialised in the study of plant viruses. During World War II, the Rothamsted Experimental Station was allocated an electron microscope for the prime purpose of studying plant viruses, and Sheffield and E. M. Crook were largely responsible for its initial assembly.

She was appointed Officer of the Order of the British Empire (OBE) in the 1972 New Year Honours, when she was described as "lately Principal Scientific Officer, Plant Quarantine Station, East African Agriculture and Forestry Research Organisation, Maguga, Kenya".

She died in Likoni, Mombasa, Kenya in 1973.

== Selected publications ==
- Sheffield, F. M. L. (1936), The susceptibility of the plant cell to virus disease. Annals of Applied Biology, 23: pp498–505. doi:10.1111/j.1744-7348.1936.tb06106.x
- Sheffield, F. M. L. (1955), Plant Quarantine in East Africa, The East African Agricultural Journal 21 (1) pp10–17
