= Roland Venables Vernon =

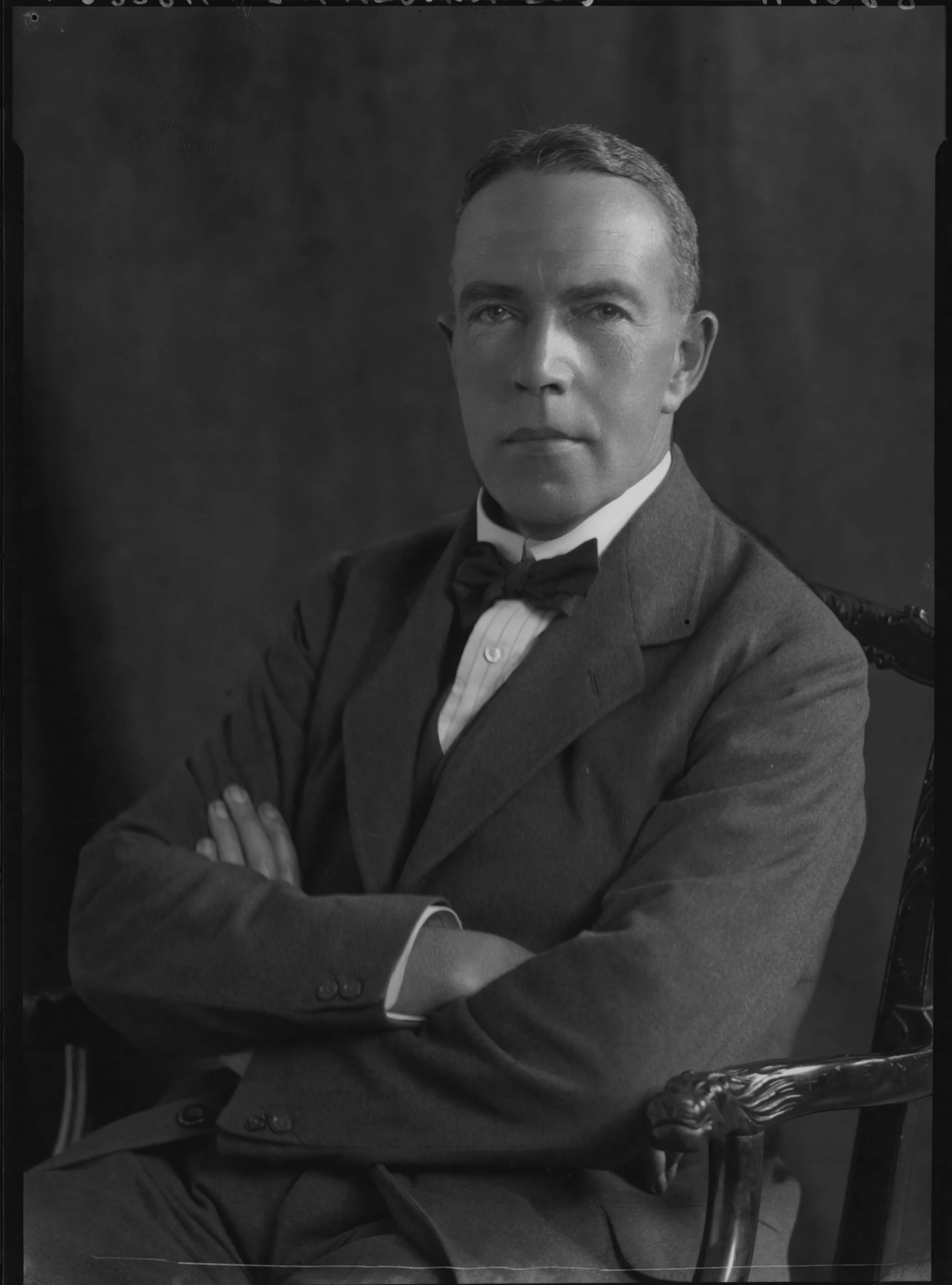
Vernon in 1928

Roland Venables Vernon, CB, (1877-1942) was a civil servant with the Colonial Office.

He attended Balliol College, Oxford, 1895-99.

In 1924 he was Assistant Secretary, Middle East Department of the Colonial office, and in the New Years Honours List he was made a Companion of the Order of the Bath.

He was a member of the Palestinian Currency Board in which capacity he signed the bank notes issued by this body.

In 1929 he was appointed by the Colonial Office to the Imperial Agricultural Bureaux with responsibility for the colonies, protectorates and mandated territories.
