= David Chadwick (civil servant) =

Member of the Indian Civil Service (1876–1954)

Sir David Chadwick, KCMG, C.S.I., C.I.E. (1876–1954) was a prominent member of the Indian Civil Service.

He was secretary of the Imperial Agricultural Bureaux which he represented on the Standing Advisory Committee of the ASLIB Microfilm Service.
