= Imperial Bureau of Plant Breeding (Herbage Plants) =

The Imperial Bureau of Plant Breeding (Herbage Plants) was one of eight bureaux established in 1929 as part of the Imperial Agricultural Bureaux.

The Bureau published material consisting of abstracts, and other accounts of contemporary research in the area of herbage and forage.
