= Henry Lipson =

British physicist

Henry (Solomon) Lipson CBE FRS
- Born: 11 March 1910; Liverpool, England
- Died: 26 April 1991 (aged 81); Haifa, Israel
- Education: Hawarden Grammar School; University of Liverpool
- Known for: X-Ray Diffraction; Beevers-Lipson Strips
- Scientific career
- Fields: Physics
- Workplaces: University of Cambridge; Manchester Institute of Science and Technology

Henry Solomon Lipson CBE FRS (11 March 1910 – 26 April 1991) was a British physicist. He was Professor of Physics, Manchester Institute of Science and Technology, 1954–77, then professor emeritus.

== Background ==
Lipson was born in Liverpool, England, into a family of Polish Jewish immigrants. His father was a steelworker at the Shotton works in Flintshire. His mother was very insistent about the importance of education and ensured that he attended Hawarden Grammar School where he won a scholarship and exhibition to study physics at Liverpool University. He graduated with First Class Honours in 1930 and stayed on to do research at Liverpool into crystal structures using x-ray diffraction.

Lipson married Jane Rosenthal on 13 December 1937, and they raised two daughters: Ann (b. 1938), who studied physics at the University of Manchester, then became a teacher, and Judith (1943–1990), who studied metallurgy at the University of Sheffield, and died of leukaemia. In 1991 the Lipsons were on a family visit to Haifa, Israel, where their son Stephen was Professor of Physics at the Technion. Henry Lipson suffered a heart attack and died on 26 April of that year, and was buried in Haifa.

== Career ==
=== University of Liverpool ===
His research into crystal structures using x-ray diffraction became his primary research interest, and in this research he teamed up with Arnold Beevers and sought advice from Professor Lawrence Bragg (who had established a major crystallographic centre in Manchester). Whilst at Liverpool, and without significant funding Beevers and Lipson made most of their own equipment and invented an aid to calculation, Beevers-Lipson Strips, which were widely used in the days before computers and which made their names well known within the field.

=== University of Cambridge ===
In 1936, Bragg invited Lipson to move to Manchester, and he later followed Bragg in moves to Teddington and then, when Bragg became Cavendish Professor in 1937, to Cambridge.

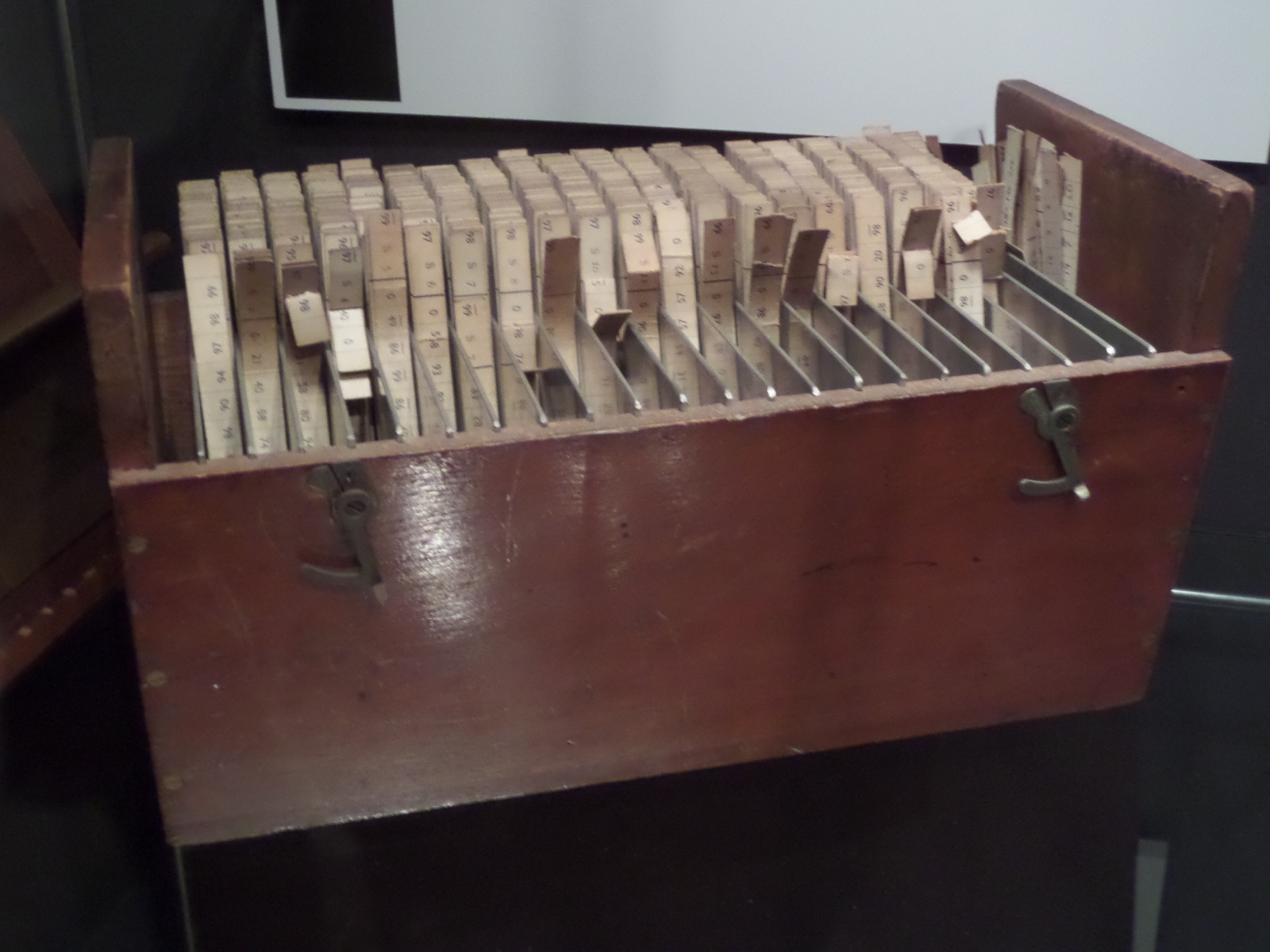
Beevers–Lipson strips, co-invented with Arnold Beevers, at the Museum of the History of Science, Oxford, part of the Crystals special exhibition in 2014.

In practical terms, Lipson was in charge of the crystallography group in Cambridge, and took on a key role in nurturing young scientists. Whilst at the Cavendish he became convinced by contact with P. P. Ewald of the importance of the Fourier transform in X-ray crystallography.

=== Manchester Institute of Science and Technology ===
He was awarded a Liverpool DSc in 1939 and a Cambridge MA in 1942, but he never really integrated into University of Cambridge life and he moved to the Manchester College of Technology (later University of Manchester Institute of Science and Technology) in 1945 as head of the physics department.

The position carried no title or status, but under his direction it quickly became a world centre for crystallographic research pioneering optical approaches to x-ray diffraction based on the Fourier transform. In 1954 he was made a professor and in 1957 he was made a Fellow of the Royal Society. He officially retired in 1977 but remained active in the department.

Lipson had a strong belief in the social responsibility of scientists, was an active member of Scientists against Nuclear Arms and was twice president of the Manchester Literary and Philosophical Society. He was appointed a CBE in 1976.

Lipson's archive is held at the University of Manchester Library.

== Evolution ==
Lipson was a proponent of evolutionary creation. He authored a paper A Physicist Looks at Evolution which was widely quote-mined by creationists. Lipson was a critic of Darwinism but did not deny that species have evolved. The New Scientist quoted him as saying "I do not accept the Genesis account of creation as anything more than pleasing fantasy. My idea of creation is much subtler, but since it is not scientific (in the sense that it cannot be tested) I shall not expound it here."

== Selected publications ==
- Lipson, H.; Beevers, C. A. (1935). "The crystal structure of the alums". Proceedings of the Royal Society of London. Series A, Mathematical and Physical Sciences. 148 (865): 664–680. Bibcode:1935RSPSA.148..664L. doi:10.1098/rspa.1935.0040.
- Lipson, H.; Taylor, A. (1939). "Defect lattices in some ternary alloys". Proceedings of the Royal Society of London. Series A. Mathematical and Physical Sciences. 173 (953): 232–237. Bibcode:1939RSPSA.173..232L. doi:10.1098/rspa.1939.0141.
- Edwards, Olive S.; Lipson, H. (1942). "Imperfections in the structure of cobalt. I. Experimental work and proposed structure". Proceedings of the Royal Society of London. Series A. Mathematical and Physical Sciences. 180 (982): 268–277. Bibcode:1942RSPSA.180..268E. doi:10.1098/rspa.1942.0039. S2CID 120675954.
- Lipson, H.; Stokes, A. R. (1942). "The structure of graphite". Proceedings of the Royal Society of London. Series A. Mathematical and Physical Sciences. 181 (984): 101–105. Bibcode:1942RSPSA.181..101L. doi:10.1098/rspa.1942.0063. S2CID 138148864.
- Daniel, Vera; Lipson, H. (1943). "An X-ray study of the dissociation of an alloy of copper, iron and nickel". Proceedings of the Royal Society of London. Series A. Mathematical and Physical Sciences. 181 (987): 368–378. Bibcode:1943RSPSA.181..368D. doi:10.1098/rspa.1943.0014. S2CID 96813847.
- Daniel, Vera; Lipson, H. (1944). "The dissociation of an alloy of copper, iron and nickel Further X -ray work". Proceedings of the Royal Society of London. Series A. Mathematical and Physical Sciences. 182 (991): 378–387. Bibcode:1944RSPSA.182..378D. doi:10.1098/rspa.1944.0012. S2CID 97395157.
- Lipson, H. S.; Taylor, C. A. (31 August 1961). "Optical models of crystal structures". New Scientist. 11 (250): 513–517.
- Lipson, Henry (1984). The study of metals and alloys by X-ray powder diffraction methods. University College Cardiff Press.
- Lipson, Henry Solomon (1990). "Reminiscences and discoveries, the introduction of Fourier methods into crystal-structure determination". Notes and Records of the Royal Society of London. 44 (2): 257–264. doi:10.1098/rsnr.1990.0021. S2CID 123077861.

Professional and academic associations
Preceded by C. E. Young	President of the Manchester Literary and Philosophical Society; 1960–62	Succeeded by Leonard Cohen
Preceded by Anthony Edmund Rivers Goulty	President of the Manchester Literary and Philosophical Society; 1977–79	Succeeded by H. M. Fairhurst
