= Edith Ditmas =

English archivist, historian and writer

- Born: Edith Margaret Robertson Ditmas; 1896
- Died: 28 February 1986 (aged 89–90)
- Occupation: archivist

Academic background
- Education: Lady Margaret Hall, Oxford

Edith Margaret Robertson Ditmas (1896 – 28 February 1986) was an English archivist, historian and writer.

== Biography ==
Ditmas was born in Weston-super-Mare, in the United Kingdom, in 1896. She studied English Language and Literature at Lady Margaret Hall, Oxford. Afterwards, she received a Second Class Honours degree and a Master of rtsree from the University of Oxford.

She was an influential official of the British Association of Special Libraries and Information Bureaux, whose journal she edited. As general secretary of what became the Association for Information Management (ASLIB) in 1946–1950, she called strongly at the Empire Scientific Conference for "a combination of government encouragement and private initiative" in developing specialized information services. This approach was to prevail. She also took over the editorship of the Journal of Documentation from 1947 until 1962.

In retirement, Ditmas turned to writing guidebooks. For a long period, she was a resident of Benson, Oxfordshire, and completed a thorough history of it in 1918. This circulated in typescript and was published posthumously in 2009, with addenda of information on subsequent archaeological research and of early maps. The one surviving picture of Ditmas was taken on a Women's Institute outing, the WI being one of her abiding interests.

Edith Ditmas died on 28 February 1986.

== Selected works ==
- 1923, Ezra and Nehemiah. SPCK, London.
- 1942, "Special library in time of war". In: Proceedings of the 17th Aslib Conference. London 1942, pp. 52–55.
- 1956, Gareth of Orkney. Faber, London. Novel.
- 1970, Tristan and Iseult in Cornwall. Forrester Roberts, Brockworth.
- 1973, A Short History of Benson Church, Oxfordshire. British Publishing, Gloucester.
- 1979, Traditions and Legends of Glastonbury. Toucan Press, St Peter Port.
- 1973, The Legend of Drake's Drum. Toucan Press, St Peter Port.
- 1981, Glastonbury Tor: Fact and Legend. Toucan Press, St Peter Port.
- 2009, The Ditmas History of Benson. Pie Powder Press, Wallingford.
