= C. Arnold Beevers =

British crystallographer

Cecil Arnold Beevers
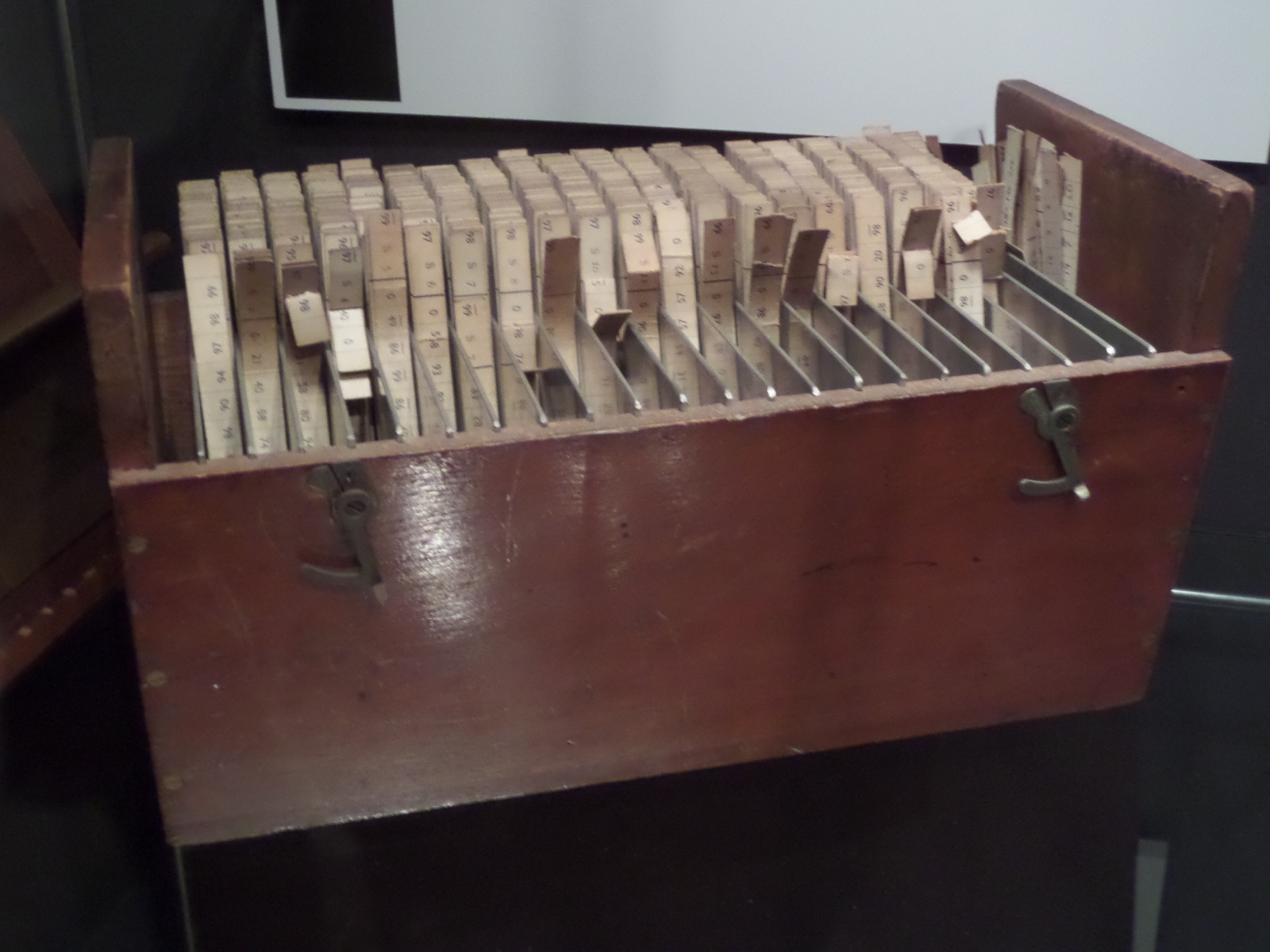
- Beevers–Lipson strips, co-invented with Henry Lipson, on display at the Museum of the History of Science, Oxford, as part of the Crystals special exhibition in 2014.
- Born: 27 May 1908; Manchester, England
- Died: 16 January 2001 (aged 92); Edinburgh, Scotland
- Education: University of Liverpool
- Known for: X-ray diffraction Beevers–Lipson strips Beevers Miniature Models; Beevers–Ross sites and anti-Beevers–Ross sites
- Scientific career
- Fields: Crystallography
- Workplaces: University of Liverpool; University of Manchester; University of Hull; University of Edinburgh
- Doctoral students: William Cochran

Cecil Arnold Beevers (27 May 1908 – 16 January 2001) was a British crystallographer, known for Beevers–Lipson strips, a computational aid for calculating Fourier transforms to determine the structure of crystals from crystallographic data, enabling the creation of models for complex molecules.

== Life and career ==
C. Arnold Beevers was born in Manchester, England. His family moved to Liverpool and he attended the University of Liverpool, gaining a BSc degree in Physics in 1929, and a DSc degree in 1933.

At Liverpool University, Beevers was influenced by Professor Lionel Wilberforce. After he graduated, Beevers was invited to work on X-ray diffraction, together with Henry Lipson. The two scientists often visited the University of Manchester to seek advice from Lawrence Bragg. Subsequently, Beevers moved to a post at Manchester. Beevers explored the structure of the crystal Beta Alumina with Marion Ross at Manchester. They noted there were 'problem' sites in the areas occupied by mobile sodium ions. Subsequently, the presence of these ions was discovered to make this crystal an efficient fast-ion conductor. As a tribute to their discovery, the locations of these ions are now known as Beevers–Ross sites and anti-Beevers–Ross sites.

Beevers then had short appointment at the University of Hull, but in 1938 he became Dewar Fellow in Crystallography at the University of Edinburgh, a post that was jointly associated with the Departments of Physics and Chemistry. Beevers was elected a Fellow of the Royal Society of Edinburgh later in the same year. Beevers remained in Edinburgh for the rest of his life and was Reader in Crystallography at the University. His notable students included Douglas M. C. MacEwan FRSE.

Arnold Beevers was a Quaker and this influenced his approach to life and science. He was involved with disabled people and this was important in his development of Beevers Miniature Models (now operating as Miramodus Ltd.), ball-and-spoke molecular models used for education purposes, largely made by disabled workers, first produced in 1961.

== Beevers–Lipson strips ==
Beevers developed Beevers–Lipson strips with Henry Lipson CBE FRS (1910–1991), Professor of Physics at the University of Manchester Institute of Science and Technology (England). The approach converted the large calculations of multi-dimensional Fourier summations needed in crystallography analysis into sums of more manageable one-dimensional values. The folded card strips with numbers were stored in normally wooden boxes, one for sines and one for cosines. Previously it was necessary to consult sine/cosine tables, a time-consuming process.

== Legacy ==
Beevers Miniature Models continued to be produced by Miramodus Ltd. at the University of Edinburgh. The British Crystallographic Association administers an Arnold Beevers Bursary Fund.

== See also ==
- X-ray crystallography
