= Maurice Moloney =

Irish biologist

Professor Maurice M. Moloney is a research biologist and biotechnology businessman. He is the former Executive Director and CEO of the Global Institute for Food Security at the University of Saskatchewan, which he left late in 2018. At the Global Institute for Food Security, Moloney more than doubled the funding for the Institute including the award of $37.2 million, the largest Federal research grant ever received by the University of Saskatchewan. Between December 2013 to October 2014 he was Group Executive, Food, Health and Life Science Industries, for the Commonwealth Scientific and Industrial Research Organisation (CSIRO). Prior to that he was Director and Chief Executive of Rothamsted Research, from April 2010 to 2013, where he revitalized the scientific and funding strategy, building new public-private partnerships.

He founded SemBioSys and served as its President from 1994-1998 and then as Chief Scientific Officer from 1998-2010. He was also the co-founder of the SemBioSys spin-out, Botaneco.

Moloney was also appointed as the NSERC/Dow AgroSciences Industrial Research Professor in the Department of Biological Sciences at the University of Calgary.

Prof. Moloney holds over 300 patents in plant biotechnology worldwide and led the Cell Biology group at Calgene to develop the world's first transgenic oilseeds, which resulted in RoundUp Ready Canola and other novel crops.

Moloney, from Carrickmacross, Co. Monaghan, obtained a Bachelor of Science in chemistry at Imperial College London and he was awarded a PhD in Plant Physiology at Leicester Polytechnic (now De Montfort University), in 1979. He was awarded a Wain Fellowship by the former Agricultural Research Council which he used to do postgraduate research at the University of Washington, in Seattle, joining Professor Robert Cleland. The results of his research were published in prestigious journals and provided a foundation for his subsequent career. From 1979 to 1983, Moloney was a Royal Society European Postdoctoral Fellow at the University of Lausanne. He was awarded a Doctor of Science in Biological Sciences by the University of Lethbridge. In 2012, he was awarded a D.Sc (honoris causa) by De Montfort University, UK and in 2013 he was awarded D.Sc (honoris causa) by Lancaster University, UK.
