= Linda M. Field =

British scientist

Linda Mary Field CBE FRES is a British scientist noted for her work on the insecticide mode of action and resistance. Field is an Honorary Fellow of the Royal Entomological Society. She was also President from 2008 to 2010. She was appointed a Commander of the British Empire for services to protecting crops and the environment in 2024. She is professor emerita as of 2024.

== Biography ==
Field was awarded a PhD on the molecular basis of insecticide resistance at Rothamsted Research in 1989. She became leader of the Insect Molecular Biology Group at Rothamsted in 2002, and then Head of the Department of Biological Chemistry in 2010 (now Biointeractions and Crop Protection, BCP).

In 2005 she was also appointed a Special Professor at the University of Nottingham. Field is a Fellow of the Royal Society of Biology and a Fellow of the Royal Entomological Society. She was also President of the Royal Entomological Society from 2008 to 2010. She was the second woman to be president of the RSE, after Dame Miriam Rothschild. In the New Year Honours of December 2024 Field was appointed a Commander of the British Empire (CBE) for services to protecting crops and the environment. In 2025 she is professor emerita at Rothamsted Research.

== Education ==
Lin Field received a BA (First Class) from the Open University in 1986. She later received a Ph.D. entitled "The Molecular Genetic Basis of Insecticide Resistance in the Peach-Potato Aphid, Myzus persicae" in 1989.

== Awards ==
- Honorary Professor University of Nottingham
- Fellow of the Royal Society of Biology
- Fellow of the Royal Entomological Society
- Honorary Editorial Officer, Royal Entomological Society
- Previous President, Royal Entomological Society
- Member of editorial board for Insect Molecular Biology
- Member Science about Science Plant Science Panel
