= William Gammie Ogg =

Scottish horticultural scientist

Sir William Gammie Ogg FRSE LLD (1891–1979) was a Scottish horticultural scientist and Director of Rothamsted Experimental Station

== Life ==
He was born at Craigbank Farm in Peterculter near Aberdeen, Scotland on 2 November 1891 the son of James Ogg and his wife, Janet Gammie. He was educated at Robert Gordon's College in Aberdeen then studied Science at the University of Aberdeen specialising in Chemistry. He graduated MA in 1912 then took a further degree in Agriculture gaining a BSc in 1913.

In the First World War he worked as a chemist at the explosives factory at Oldbury and at Greetland in Yorkshire. After the war, in 1924, he began working as an Advisory Officer at the East Of Scotland College of Agriculture. In 1925 he was elected a Fellow of the Royal Society of Edinburgh. His proposers were Alexander Lauder, Sir James Walker, George Barger and Ralph Allan Sampson.

In 1930, he went to the Macaulay Institute in Aberdeen as its director. In 1943, upon the retirement of E. John Russell. he was appointed Director to Rothamsted Experimental Station. He also had the ex-officio role of Consultant Director of the Imperial Bureau of Soil Science. His colleagues there included Douglas M. C. MacEwan FRSE.

He was knighted by King George VI in 1949.

He served as President of the Chemistry Institute of Great Britain from 1953 to 1955.

He retired in 1958 and died at Arnhall in Edzell, Angus on 25 September 1979. He is buried in Edzell Churchyard.

== Family ==
In 1922 he married Helen Hilbert.
