= Beevers–Lipson strip =

Mathematical tool in crystallography

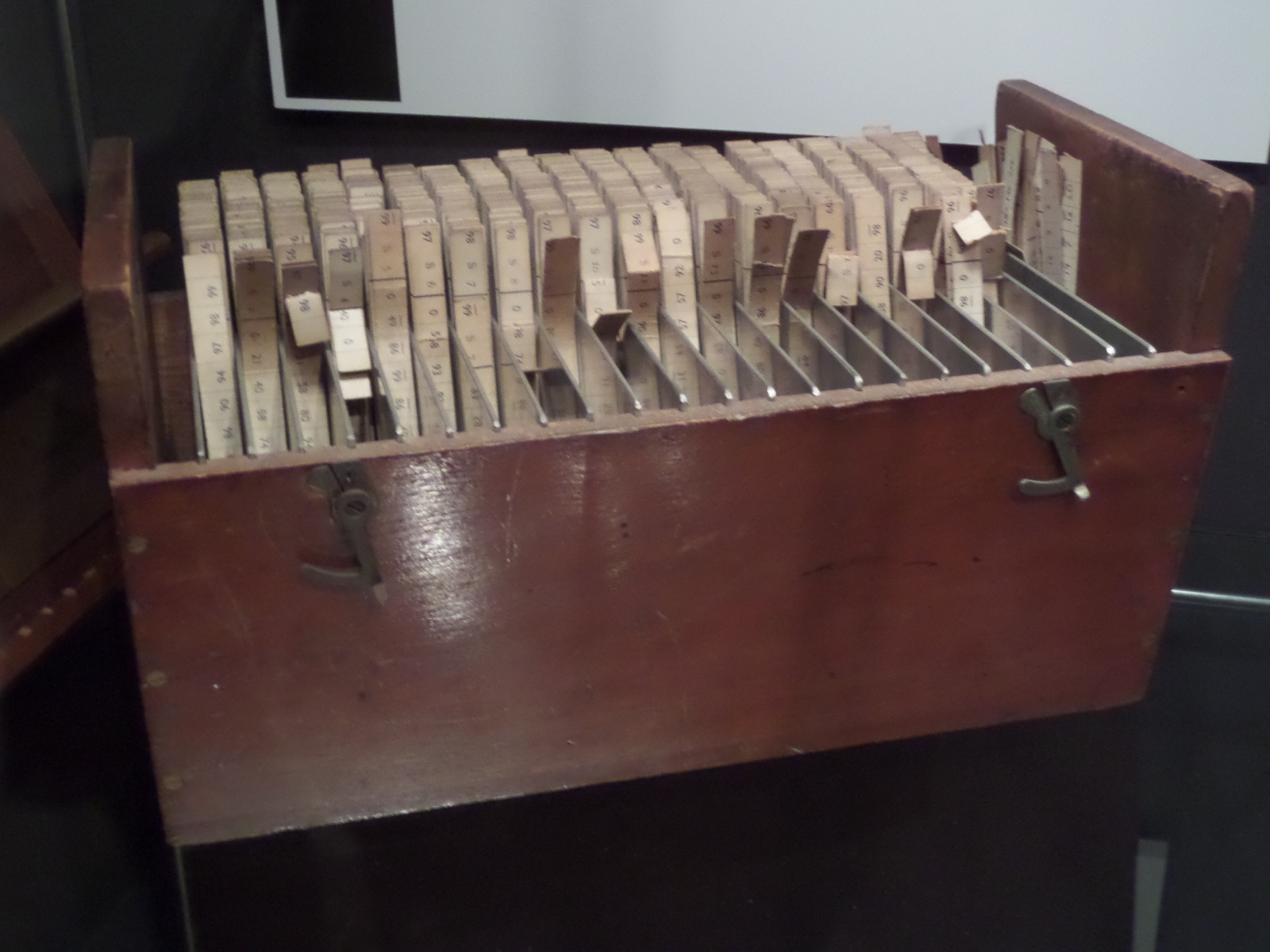
Beevers–Lipson strips at the Museum of the History of Science, Oxford, part of the Crystals special exhibition in 2014. These were used by the Nobel Prize winner Dorothy Hodgkin in Oxford.

Beevers–Lipson strips were a computational aid for early crystallographers in calculating Fourier transforms to determine the structure of crystals from crystallographic data, enabling the creation of models for complex molecules. They were used from the 1930s until computers with enough power became generally available in the 1960s.

The technique was developed by C. Arnold Beevers (1908–2001), reader in crystallography at the University of Edinburgh, and Henry Lipson CBE FRS (1910–1991), Professor of Physics at the University of Manchester Institute of Science and Technology. The approach converted the sizable calculations of multi-dimensional Fourier summations needed in crystallography analysis into sums of more manageable one-dimensional values. The folded card strips with numbers were typically stored in two wooden boxes, one for sines and one for cosines. Previously it was necessary to consult sine/cosine tables, a time-consuming process. The approach was used by the Nobel Prize winner Dorothy Hodgkin OM FRS (1910–1994). The technique was used in computer programs until the invention of the fast Fourier transform.

== See also ==
- X-ray crystallography
