= Edward Frankland Armstrong =

English chemist

Edward Frankland Armstrong FRS (5 September 1878 – 14 December 1945) was an English organic chemist who researched carbohydrates, catalysis, and industrial applications.

Armstrong was the eldest son of chemistry professor H. E. Armstrong and Frances Louisa (1843/4–1935), daughter of pharmacist Thomas Howard Lavers and was born in Lewisham, London. He was named after his father's favourite teacher Edward Frankland. Armstrong became interested in chemistry at an early age thanks to his father and studied organic chemistry in Kiel under L. Claisen in 1898. He spent two years in Berlin under J. van't Hoff and after obtaining a PhD in 1901, he became an assistant of Emil Fischer in Berlin taking an interest the chemistry of carbohydrates. He returned to England and in 1905 received a DSc for work on carbohydrates. He worked as a chemist to the biscuit manufacturing company Huntley and Palmer, Reading while also pursuing research on glycosides with his father and Frederick Keeble. In 1914 he worked with the soap and chemical company Joseph Crosfield & Sons, working on problems of catalysis and was involved in supplying chemicals needed during the war including acetic acid and acetone. He was elected to the Royal Society in 1920. He became a director at the British Dyestuffs Corporation in 1925 which was acquired by Imperial Chemical Industries. From 1928 he served as a consultant chemist for many industries. He presided over the Association of British Chemical Manufacturers in 1935. He advised the government on air-raid measures during World War II. Charles Stanley Gibson and

Armstrong married Ethel Mary Turpin of Woolwich in 1907 and they had three sons and a daughter. His second son Kenneth Frankland (1909–1935) also became a chemist but died young, killed in an avalanche while skiing. Armstrong died from complications following an appendicitis surgery. He was considered a poor speaker but wrote several books The Simple Carbohydrates and Glucosides (1910), Chemistry in the Twentieth Century (1924), The Sea as a Storehouse (1944), Raw Materials from the Sea (1945), and coauthored The Glycosides (1931).
