= Joseph Grisdale =

Joseph Hiram Grisdale (18 February, 1870, Hudson - 24 August, 1939, Ottawa) was a Canadian agriculturist who was director of the Dominion Experimental Farms as well as having served as the federal Deputy Minister of Agriculture.

He took on the role of director on the retirement of the founder, William Saunders who retired in 1911. He continued the expansion of the agricultural research in Canada. In his role as the federal Deputy Minister of Agriculture, he made an announcement at the Better Farming Conference in 1920. He announced the decision to make the Swift Current Experimental Station.
