= British Crystallographic Association =

British scientific organisation

- Abbreviation: BCA
- Formation: April 1982
- Type: Learned society
- Registration no.: 284718 (England & Wales)
- Legal status: Active
- Location: United Kingdom
- Members: >600
- President: Alexandra Gibbs
- Affiliations: International Union of Crystallography (IUCr), Institute of Physics, Royal Society of Chemistry
- Revenue: £117,909 (2024)
- Website: www.crystallography.org.uk

The British Crystallographic Association (BCA) is an organisation for crystallography in the United Kingdom. It acts as the United Kingdom Adhering Body to the International Union of Crystallography (IUCr). The association is multidisciplinary and supports research and teaching in chemistry, physics, biology and materials science, in both academia and industry.

The Association administers a Dorothy Hodgkin Prize and an Arnold Beevers Bursary Fund.

== History ==
Before the society was formed, British researchers in the field were divided between the X-ray Analysis Group of the Institute of Physics and the Chemical Crystallography Group of the Chemical Society (now the Royal Society of Chemistry). To address this separation, an impromptu working group was set up in 1979 to consider the establishment of a single unified association, followed by a 1980 working party with David Blow as chair and Stephen Wallwork as secretary. These discussions ultimately led to the founding of the BCA in 1982.

== See also ==
- American Crystallographic Association
- German Crystallographic Society
