= ASLIB =

Former UK association of special libraries

ASLIB: The Association for Information Management (often stylized Aslib) was a British association of special libraries and information centres. It was founded in England in 1924 as the Association of Special Libraries and Information Bureaux.

== Now ==
The organization ceased functioning as an independent organization in 2010, when it became a division of Emerald Group Publishing. Since 2015, ASLIB has existed only as Emerald's professional development arm.

== Foundation and early years ==
The Association of Special Libraries and Information Bureaux was founded in September 1924 at a conference in Hoddesdon, Hertfordshire.

The third ASLIB conference was held at Balliol College, Oxford, 24-27 September 1926. Sandie Lindsay, Master of Balliol College, welcomed 150 delegates to the college. Harry Levy-Lawson, 1st Viscount Burnham, who had studied at Balliol College remarked that "as science and learning knew no national bounds so internationalism was at once the secret and necessity of all advancement in original research and practical discovery. The Internationalisation of knowledge was INTERNATIONALISM IN EXCELSIS" and went on to speak warmly of the International Labour Organization, who had expanded their range of activities to include fostering greater intellectual co-operation amongst the nations of their parent body, the League of Nations.

== Documentation during World War II ==
ASLIB played a particular role in World War II obtaining journals and other documents from the Axis powers countries. Many countries around the world lost access to the documentation of academic and scientific information during wartime. UK libraries were often able to obtain these documents through neutral European countries. With Eugene Power, microfilming expert, and with funding from some US foundations such as the Rockefeller Foundation, ASLIB set up the ASLIB Microfilm Service that was able to supply key publications to countries that had no other access to them.

== Publications ==
ASLIB published these journals:

- ASLIB Proceedings: New Information Perspectives
- Journal of Documentation
- Library Hi Tech News : incorporating Online and CD Notes
- Performance Measurement and Metrics
- Program: electronic library & information systems
- Records Management Journal
- Reference Reviews : incorporating ASLIB Book Guide
- ASLIB Directory of Information Sources in the United Kingdom (First published in 1928).

From 1973, the Audiovisual Group of ASLIB, in conjunction with the Audiovisual Group of the Library Association, published:

- The Audiovisual Librarian

== See also ==
- ASLIB Microfilm Service
- Cranfield Experiments
